= List of spiral galaxies =

A spiral galaxy is a type of galaxy characterized by a central bulge of old Population II stars surrounded by a rotating disc of younger Population I stars. A spiral galaxy maintains its spiral arms due to density wave theory.

== Spiral galaxies ==
Below is a list of notable spiral galaxies with their own articles. The classification column refers to the galaxy morphological classification used by astronomers to describe galaxy structure.

Designation	Picture	Classification	Constellation	Apparent Magnitude
A1689B11		S	Virgo	24
Big Wheel galaxy		S	Phoenix	
BRI 1335-0417		S	Virgo	19.4
BX442		Sc	Pegasus	24.4R
CEERS-2112		SBbc	Boötes	
Comet Galaxy		S	Sculptor	18.7
ESO 97-G13, Circinus Galaxy		S	Circinus	11
ESO 510-G13		Sa: pec sp	Hydra	13.4
IC 342		SAB(rs)cd	Camelopardalis	9.1
IC 1296		SBbc	Lyra	14.8
ISOHDFS 27		Sab/Sbc	Tucana	20.51
IC 2163		SB(rs)c pec	Canis Major	11.6
IC 4970		SA0^{−} pec	Pavo	12.7
IC 5332		Sc	Sculptor	10.72
J094700.09+254045.8		Sy1	Leo	13.49
LEDA 100170, Dwingeloo 1		SB(s)cd	Cassiopeia	8.3
M31, Andromeda Galaxy		SA(s)b	Andromeda	4.36
M33, Triangulum Galaxy		SA(s)cd	Triangulum	6.3
M51a, Whirlpool Galaxy		SA(s)bc pec	Canes Venatici	9.0
M58		SAB(rs)b	Virgo	10.5
M61		SAB(rs)bc	Virgo	10.2
M63, Sunflower Galaxy		SA(rs)bc	Canes Venatici	9.3
M64, Black Eye Galaxy		(R)SA(rs)ab	Coma Berenices	9.4
M65		SAB(rs)a	Leo	10.3
M66		SAB(s)b	Leo	9.7
M74		SA(s)c	Pisces	9.95
M77		(R)SA(rs)b	Cetus	9.6
M81		SA(s)ab	Ursa Major	7.9
M83		SAB(s)c	Hydra	8.2
M88		SA(rs)b	Coma Berenices	10.4
M90		SAB(rs)ab	Virgo	10.3
M91		SBb(rs)	Coma Berenices	11.0
M94		SA(r)ab	Canes Venatici	9.0
M95		SB(r)b	Leo	11.4
M96		SAB(rs)ab	Leo	10.1
M98		SAB(s)ab	Coma Berenices	11
M99, Coma Pinwheel Galaxy		SA(s)c	Coma Berenices	10.4
M100		SAB(s)bc	Coma Berenices	10.1
M101, Pinwheel Galaxy		SAB(rs)cd	Ursa Major	8.3
M104, Sombrero Galaxy		SA(s)a	Virgo	9.0
M106		SAB(s)bc	Canes Venatici	9.1
M108		SB(s)cd	Ursa Major	10.7
M109		SB(rs)bc	Ursa Major	10.6
Maffei 2		SAB(rs)bc	Cassiopeia	16.0
Malin 1		SB0a LSB	Coma Berenices	15.8
Milky Way		SB(rs)bc	Sagittarius	N/A
NGC 1		SA(s)b	Pegasus	13.65
NGC 2		Sab	Pegasus	+15.0
NGC 17		Sc	Cetus	15.3
NGC 24		SA(s)c	Sculptor	12.4
NGC 47		SB(rs)bc	Cetus	13.5
NGC 247		SAB(s)d	Cetus	9.9
NGC 253, Sculptor Galaxy		SAB(s)c	Sculptor	8.0
NGC 262		S0a	Andromeda	13.1
NGC 300		SA(s)d	Sculptor	9.0
NGC 514		SAB(rs)c	Pisces	12.2
NGC 613		SB(rs)bc	Sculptor	10.0
NGC 625		SB(s)m	Phoenix	11.7
NGC 765		SAB(rs)bc	Aries	13.0
NGC 772		SA(s)b	Aries	11.1
NGC 891		SA(s)b	Andromeda	10.8
NGC 908		SA(s)c	Cetus	10.8
NGC 1032		S0/a	Cetus	12.6
NGC 1042		SAB(rs)cd	Cetus	14.0
NGC 1055		SBb:II-III: spindle	Cetus	11.6
NGC 1087		SAB(rs)c	Cetus	12.2
NGC 1090		SB(rs)bc	Cetus	12.5
NGC 1097		R'_1:)SB(r'l)bSy1	Fornax	10.2
NGC 1232		SAB(rs)c	Eridanus	10.9
NGC 1291		(R)SB0/a	Eridanus	9.39
NGC 1300		(R')SB(s)bc	Eridanus	11.4
NGC 1309		SA(s)bc	Eridanus	12.0
NGC 1313		SB(s)d pec	Reticulum	9.7
NGC 1365		(R')SBb(s)b	Fornax	10.3
NGC 1398		(R')SB(r)ab	Fornax	10.6
NGC 1511		SAa pec	Hydrus	11.3
NGC 1512		SB(r)ab	Horologium	11.1
NGC 1530		SB(rs)bc	Camelopardalis	12.3
NGC 1532		SB(s)b pec	Eridanus	10.7
NGC 1560		SA(s)d	Camelopardalis	9.82
NGC 1566		SAB(rs)bc	Dorado	9.73
NGC 1637		SAB(rs)c	Eridanus	11.5
NGC 1672		(R')SB(r)bc	Dorado	10.3
NGC 1808		(R)SAB(s)a	Columba	9.94
NGC 2146		SB(s)ab pec	Camelopardalis	11.38
NGC 2207		SAB(rs)bc pec	Canis Major	12.2
NGC 2336		SAB(r)bc	Camelopardalis	10.3
NGC 2403		SAB(s)cd	Camelopardalis	8.9
NGC 2442		SAB(s)bc pec	Volans	11.2
NGC 2541		SA(s)cd	Lynx	12.3
NGC 2683		SA(rs)b	Lynx	10.6
NGC 2715		SABc	Camelopardalis	12
NGC 2775		SA(r)ab	Cancer	10.4
NGC 2835		SAB(rs)c	Hydra	10.3
NGC 2841		SA(r)b	Ursa Major	10.1
NGC 2903		SB(s)d	Leo	9.7
NGC 2976		SAc pec	Ursa Major	10.8
NGC 2997		SA(s)c	Antlia	10.1
NGC 3054		SAB(r)bc	Hydra	12.6
NGC 3079		SB(s)c	Ursa Major	11.5
NGC 3109		SB(s)m	Hydra	10.4
Little Pinwheel Galaxy, NGC 3184		SA(s)b	Ursa Major	10.4
NGC 3223		Sb	Antlia	12
NGC 3227		SAB(s) pec	Leo	11.1
NGC 3310		SAB(r)bc pec	Ursa Major	11.2
NGC 3314		SBbc/SAab	Hydra	12.5
NGC 3344		(R)SAB(r)bc	Leo Minor	10.5
NGC 3370		SA(s)c	Leo	12.3
NGC 3486		Sb	Leo Minor	11.0
NGC 3521		SABbc	Leo	10
NGC 3596		SAB(rs)c	Leo	12.0
NGC 3621		SA(s)d	Hydra	9.56
NGC 3628		SAb pec	Leo	14.0
NGC 3631		SA(s)c	Ursa Major	10.1
NGC 3642			Ursa Major	10.8
NGC 3718		SB(s)a pec	Ursa Major	10.61
NGC 3877		Sc	Ursa Major	12.1
NGC 3949		SA(s)bc	Ursa Major	11.5
NGC 3953		SB(r)bc	Ursa Major	10.8
NGC 3981			Crater	11
NGC 3982		SAB(r)b	Ursa Major	12.0
NGC 4013		SAb	Ursa Major	19.2
NGC 4027		SB(s)dm	Corvus	11.7
NGC 4088		SAB(rs)bc	Ursa Major	11.2
NGC 4151		(R')SAB(rs)ab	Canes Venatici	11.5
NGC 4216		SAB(s)b	Virgo	11.0
NGC 4314		SBa	Coma Berenices	11.4
NGC 4388		SB(s)b	Virgo	11.02
NGC 4395		SA(s)m	Canes Venatici	10.6
NGC 4414		SA(rs)c	Coma Berenices	11.0
NGC 4535		SAB(s)c	Virgo	11.1
NGC 4559		SAB(rs)cd	Coma Berenices	10.4
NGC 4565		SA(s)b	Coma Berenices	10.42
NGC 4618		SB(rs)m	Canes Venatici	11.2
NGC 4622		SA(r)ab	Centaurus	12.6
NGC 4625		SAB(rs)m pec	Canes Venatici	13.2
NGC 4631		SB(s)d	Canes Venatici	9.8
NGC 4651		SA(rs)c	Coma Berenices	11.39
NGC 4666		SABc	Virgo	10.8
NGC 4725		SAB(r)ab pec	Coma Berenices	10.1
NGC 4911		Sb	Coma Berenices	13.33
NGC 4945		SB(s)cd	Centaurus	9.3
NGC 5001		SB	Ursa Major	12.82
NGC 5005		SAB(rs)bc	Canes Venatici	10.6
NGC 5033		SA(s)c	Canes Venatici	10.8
NGC 5068		SB(s)d	Virgo	10.5
NGC 5078		SA(s)a	Hydra	11.8
NGC 5091		Sb pec sp	Centaurus	13.9
NGC 5164		SBb	Ursa Major	14.1
NGC 5257		SAB(s)b pec	Virgo	12.9
NGC 5258		SA(s)b pec	Virgo	12.9
NGC 5474		SA(s)cd pec	Ursa Major	11.3
NGC 5624		S	Virgo	14.6
NGC 5713		SAB(rs)bc pec	Virgo	12.1
NGC 5746		SB(rs)b	Virgo	11.0
NGC 5829		SA(s)c	Boötes	14.1
NGC 5907		SA(s)c? edge-on	Draco	11.1
NGC 5921		SB(r)bc	Serpens Caput	11.5
NGC 6118		SA(s)cd	Serpens	12.42
NGC 6503		SAB(rs)bc	Draco	10.2
NGC 6744		SAB(r)bc	Pavo	9.14
NGC 6745		S	Lyra	13.3
NGC 6753		(R)SA(r)b	Pavo	11.9
NGC 6810		SA(s)ab	Pavo	11.6
NGC 6872		SAB(rs)c	Pavo	12.7
NGC 6946		SAB(rs)cd	Cepheus	9.6
NGC 7217		(R)SA(r)ab	Pegasus	11.0
NGC 7318		SB(s)bc pec	Pegasus	14.4 / 13.9
NGC 7329		SBbc	Tucana	11.31
NGC 7331		SA(s)b	Pegasus	10.4
NGC 7424		SAB(rs)cd	Grus	11.0
NGC 7479		SB(s)c	Pegasus	11.6
NGC 7742		SA(r)b	Pegasus	12.4
NGC 7752		SAB(rs)bc	Pegasus	12.8
NGC 7793		SA(s)d	Sculptor	10.0
NGC 7814		SA(S)ab	Pegasus	11.6
UGC 2885		SA(rs)c	Perseus	13.5
UGC 10214, Tadpole Galaxy		SB(s)c pec	Draco	14.4
UGC 12158		SB	Pegasus	14.5
Alaknanda Galaxy		S	Sculptor	
Zhúlóng		Sbc	Sextans	

== See also ==
- Lists of astronomical objects
- List of galaxies
- Spiral galaxy
