= NGC 5885 =

Barred spiral galaxy in the constellation Libra

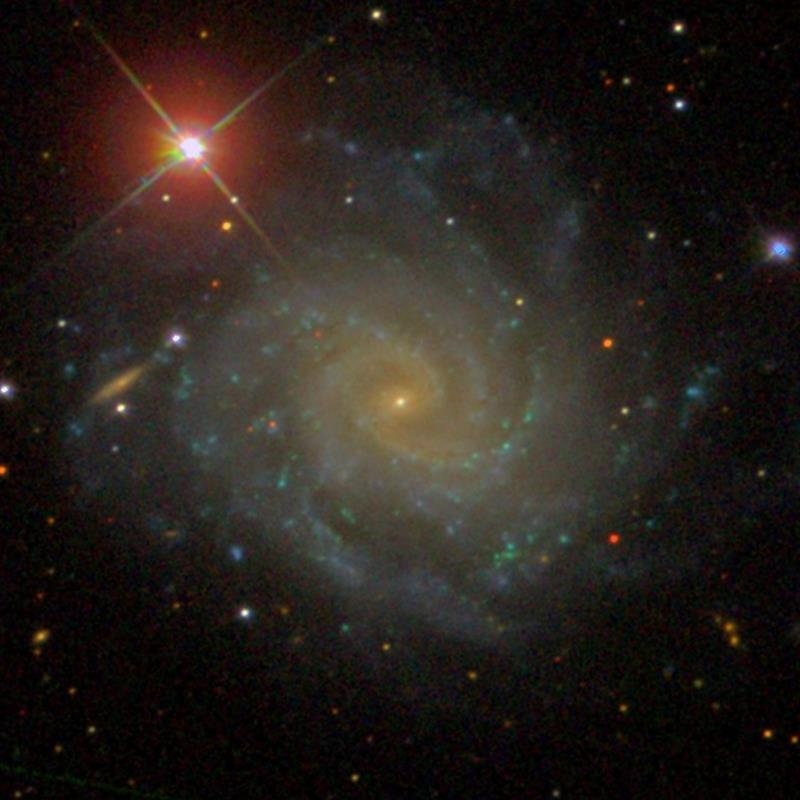
- NGC 5885 as seen by the Sloan Digital Sky Survey (SDSS)

Observation data (J2000 epoch)
- Constellation: Libra
- Right ascension: 15h 15m 03s
- Declination: -10° 05′ 09″
- Redshift: 0.006671
- Heliocentric radial velocity: 2,000 km/s
- Distance: 105 Mly (32.23 Mpc)
- Apparent magnitude (V): 11.8
- Apparent magnitude (B): 12.3
- Surface brightness: 23.37 mag/arcsec^{2}

Characteristics
- Type: SAB(r)c
- Size: 3.5' x 3.1'

Other designations
- IRAS 15123-0954, PGC 54429, MCG -02-039-013

NGC 5885 is an intermediate barred spiral galaxy located in the constellation Libra. Its speed relative to the cosmic microwave background is 2,185 ± 13 km/s, which corresponds to a Hubble distance of 32.3 ± 2.3 Mpc (~105 million ly). NGC 5885 was discovered by German-British astronomer William Herschel in 1784.

The luminosity class of NGC 5885 is III and it has a broad HI line. It also contains regions of ionized hydrogen. With a surface brightness equal to 14.39 mag/am2, we can qualify NGC 5885 as a low surface brightness galaxy (LSB). LSB galaxies are diffuse galaxies with a surface brightness less than one magnitude lower than that of the ambient night sky.

To date, 11 non-redshift measurements yield a distance of 22.055 ± 5.687 Mpc (~71.9 million ly), which is outside the distance values of Hubble. Note that it is with the average value of independent measurements, when they exist, that the NASA/IPAC database calculates the diameter of a galaxy and that consequently the diameter of NGC 5885 could be approximately 37, 5 kpc (~122,000 ly) if we used the Hubble distance to calculate it.

== See also ==
- List of NGC objects (5001–6000)
- List of spiral galaxies
- New General Catalogue
