= NGC 4017 =

Spiral radio galaxy in the constellation Coma Berenices

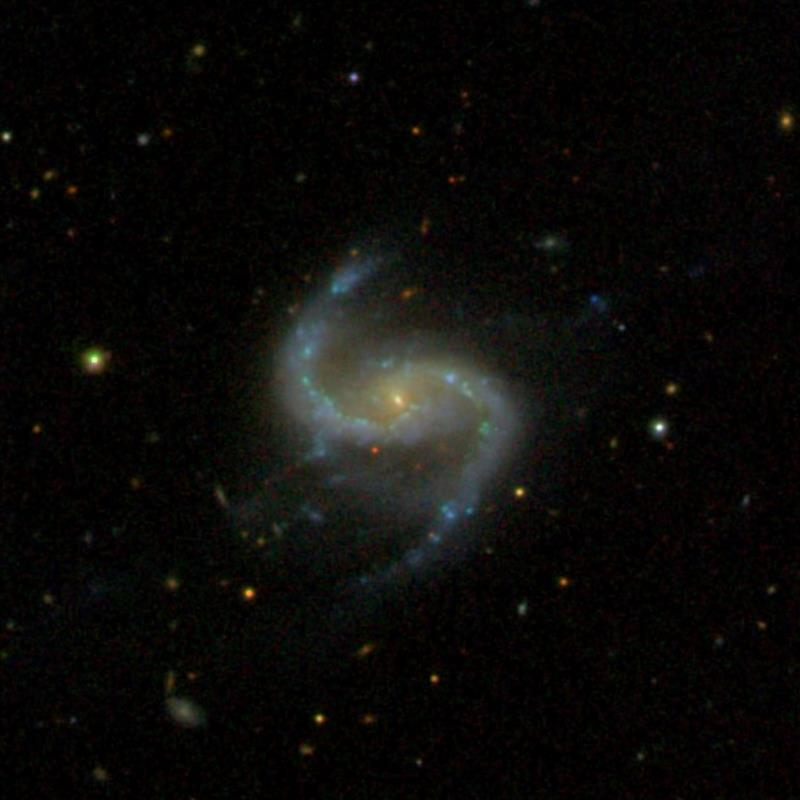

Observation data (J2000 epoch)
- Constellation: Coma Berenices
- Right ascension: 11h 58m 45s
- Declination: +27° 27′ 08″
- Apparent magnitude (B): 13.5
- Surface brightness: 22.48 mag/arcsec^2

Characteristics
- Type: SAbc

NGC 4017 is an intermediate spiral radio galaxy located in the constellation Coma Berenices. Its speed relative to the cosmic microwave background is 3,748 ± 21 km/s, which corresponds to a Hubble distance of 55.3 ± 3.9 Mpc (~180 million ly). NGC 4017 was discovered by German-British astronomer William Herschel on April 11, 1785.

It is difficult to see a bar in the center of NGC 4017 in the image obtained from the SDSS survey data. The intermediate spiral classification from the NASA/IPAC database seems to fit this galaxy better.

The luminosity class of NGC 4017 is II-III and it has a broad HI line.

To date, four non-redshift measurements yield a distance of 73.850 ± 14.580 Mpc (~241 million ly), which is just outside the Hubble distance values. Note, however, that it is with the average value of independent measurements, when they exist, that the NASA/IPAC database calculates the diameter of a galaxy and that consequently the diameter of NGC 4017 could be approximately 29.3 kpc (~95,600 ly) if we used the Hubble distance to calculate it.

== Supernovae ==
Three supernovae have been discovered in NGC 4017:

- SN 2006st (Type II, mag. 18.3) was discovered by D. Winslow and W. Li as part of LOSS (Lick Observatory Supernova Search) on May 30, 2006.
- SN 2007an (Type II, mag. 17.5) was discovered by Marco Migliardi on March 10, 2007, in an image taken at the Drusci observatory in the Italian town of Cortina d'Ampezzo.
- SN 2025acru (Type I, mag. 19.2806) was discovered by the Zwicky Transient Facility on October 29, 2025.

== NGC 4017 Group ==
According to A.M. Garcia, the galaxy NGC 4017 is part of a group of galaxies that bears his name. The NGC 4017 group has four members. The other members of the group are NGC 4004, NGC 4008 and NGC 4016.

Abraham Mahtessian also mentions a group of which NGC 4008 is a part, but there are only three galaxies in his list, NGC 4017 not appearing there.

On the other hand, it is surprising that the galaxy IC 2982 to the west of NGC 4004 does not appear in either list. The distance separating it from the Milky Way is 53.86 ± 3.78 Mpc (~176 million ly), practically the same as that of NGC 4004.

This galaxy is even designated as NGC 4004B by the database NASA/IPAC We could even say that the two galaxies form an interacting pair given the deformation of NGC 4004. This is undoubtedly why the two galaxies are included in the catalog of Vorontsov-Velyaminov interacting galaxies.

The galaxies NGC 4016 and NGC 4017 are almost the same distance from the Milky Way and are neighbors in the celestial sphere. The image obtained from the SDSS study data shows a certain deformation in the galaxy NGC 4016.

These two galaxies are surely in gravitational interaction and they also appear in the catalog of Vorontsov-Velyaminov interacting galaxies. They also appear in Halton Arp's Atlas of Peculiar Galaxies under the designation Arp 305. Halton Arp notes that one of the arms of NGC 4016 has a broken segment.

== See also ==
- List of spiral galaxies
- List of NGC objects (4001–5000)
- Radio galaxy
