= NGC 5416 =

Spiral and radio galaxy in the constellation Boötes

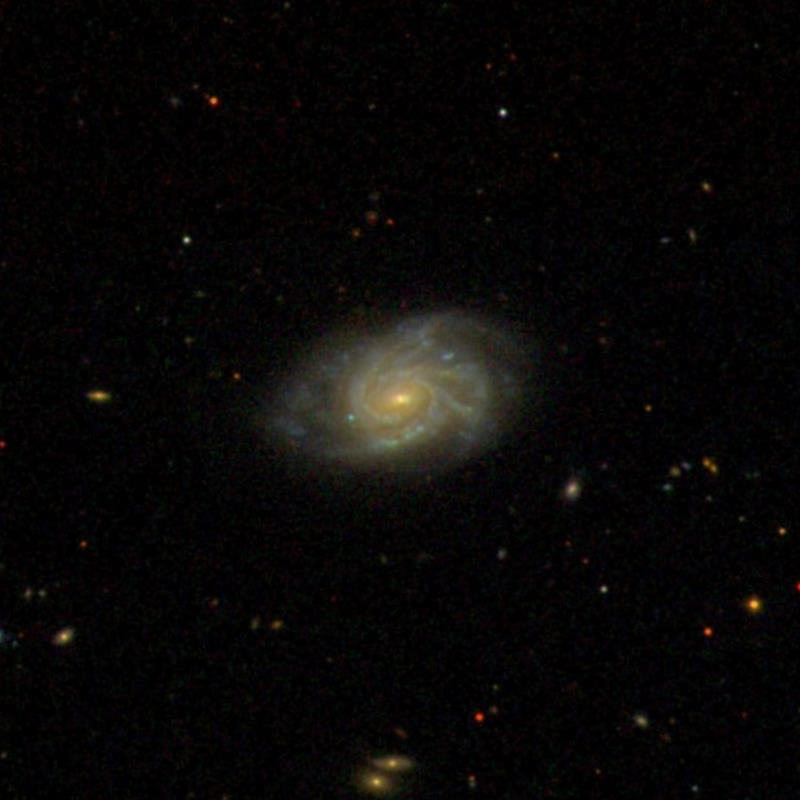

Observation data (J2000 epoch)
- Constellation: Boötes
- Right ascension: 14^{h} 02^{m} 11.3153^{s}
- Declination: +09° 26′ 24.350″
- Redshift: 0.020811±0.00000900
- Distance: 261.42 ± 8.13 Mly (80.152 ± 2.492 Mpc)
- Apparent magnitude (B): 13.6
- Surface brightness: 22.79 mag/arcsec^2

Characteristics
- Type: Scd
- Size: ~114,100 ly (34.97 kpc) (estimated)
- Apparent size (V): 1.37′ × 0.75′

Other designations
- IRAS 13597+0940, UGC 8944, MCG +02-36-014, PGC 49991, CGCG 074-052

NGC 5416 is a spiral galaxy and radio galaxy located in the constellation Boötes. Its speed relative to the cosmic microwave background is 6,499 ± 18 km/s, which corresponds to a Hubble distance of 95.9 ± 6.7 Mpc (~313 million ly). NGC 5416 was discovered by German-British astronomer William Herschel on 19 March 1784.

The luminosity class of NGC 5416 is III-IV and it has a broad HI line. According to the SIMBAD database, NGC 5416 is a radio galaxy.

To date, 25 non-redshift measurements yield a distance of 80.152 ± 2.492 Mpc (~261 million ly), which is within the Hubble distance values. Note that it is with the average value of independent measurements, when they exist, that the NASA/IPAC database calculates the diameter of a galaxy and that consequently the diameter of NGC 5416 could be approximately 41.8 kpc (~136,000 ly) if we used the Hubble distance to calculate it.

== NGC 5423 group ==
NGC 5416 is part of the NGC 5423 group, the brightest galaxy in this group. This group of galaxies has at least four members, including NGC 5409, NGC 5423, and NGC 5424.

== Supernova ==
One supernova has been observed in NGC 5416: SN 2025trg (Type II, mag. 19.6808) was discovered by the Zwicky Transient Facility on 11 August 2025.

== See also ==
- List of NGC objects (5001–6000)
- List of spiral galaxies
