= NGC 4712 =

Spiral galaxy in the constellation Coma Berenices

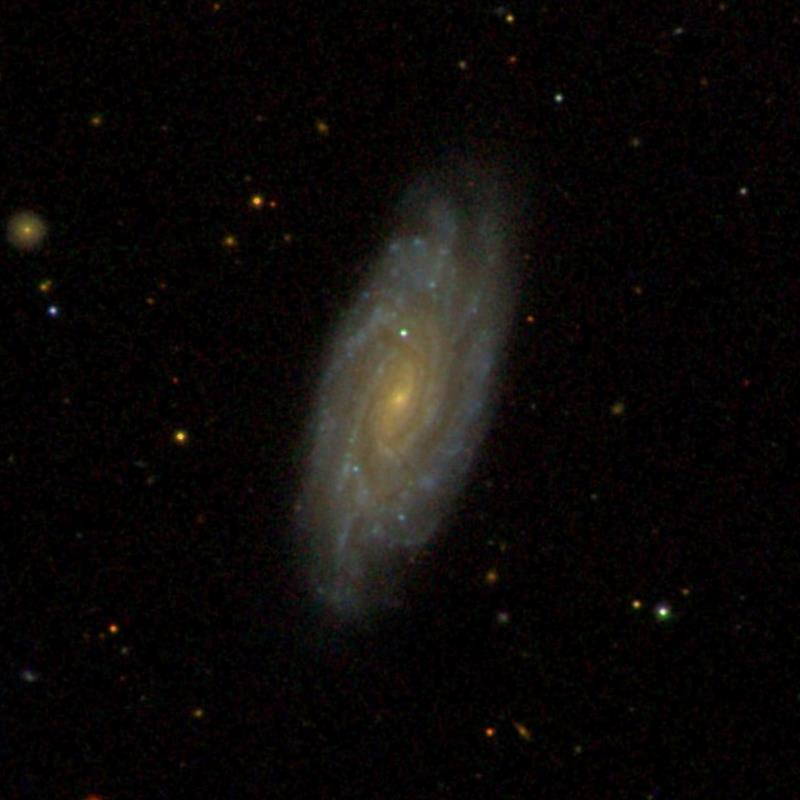
- NGC 4712 as seen during the Sloan Digital Sky Survey (SDSS)

Observation data (J2000 epoch)
- Constellation: Coma Berenices
- Right ascension: 12h 49m 33s
- Declination: +25° 28′ 11″
- Distance: ~224 million ly
- Apparent magnitude (B): 13.5
- Surface brightness: 22.66 mag/arcsec^2

Characteristics
- Type: SAbc

Other designations
- PGC 43368, UGC 7977, MCG 4-30-21, CGCG 129-25, KUG 1247+257A, IRAS 12471+2544

NGC 4712 is a spiral galaxy located in the constellation Coma Berenices. Its speed relative to the cosmic microwave background is 4,664 ± 20 km/s, which corresponds to a Hubble distance of 68.8 ± 4.8 Mpc (~224 million ly). NGC 4712 was discovered by German-British astronomer John Herschel in 1832.

The luminosity class of NGC 4712 is II-III and it has a broad HI line. It also contains regions of ionized hydrogen.

To date, around ten measurements not based on redshift give a distance of 63.640 ± 16.932 Mpc (~208 million ly), which is within the distance values of Hubble. Note, however, that it is with the average value of independent measurements, when they exist, that the NASA/IPAC database calculates the diameter of a galaxy and that consequently the diameter of NGC 4712 could be approximately 51 .4 kpc (~168,000 ly) if we used the Hubble distance to calculate it.

According to Vaucouleur and Harold Corwin, NGC 4712 and NGC 4725 form a pair of galaxies. However, like several others mentioned in this article, these two galaxies are not an actual pair, because NGC 4725's radial velocity is 1,209 ± 1 km/s and is therefore much closer to the Milky Way. It is therefore an optical pair.

== See also ==
- List of spiral galaxies
- List of NGC objects (4001–5000)
