= NGC 7169 =

Lenticular galaxy

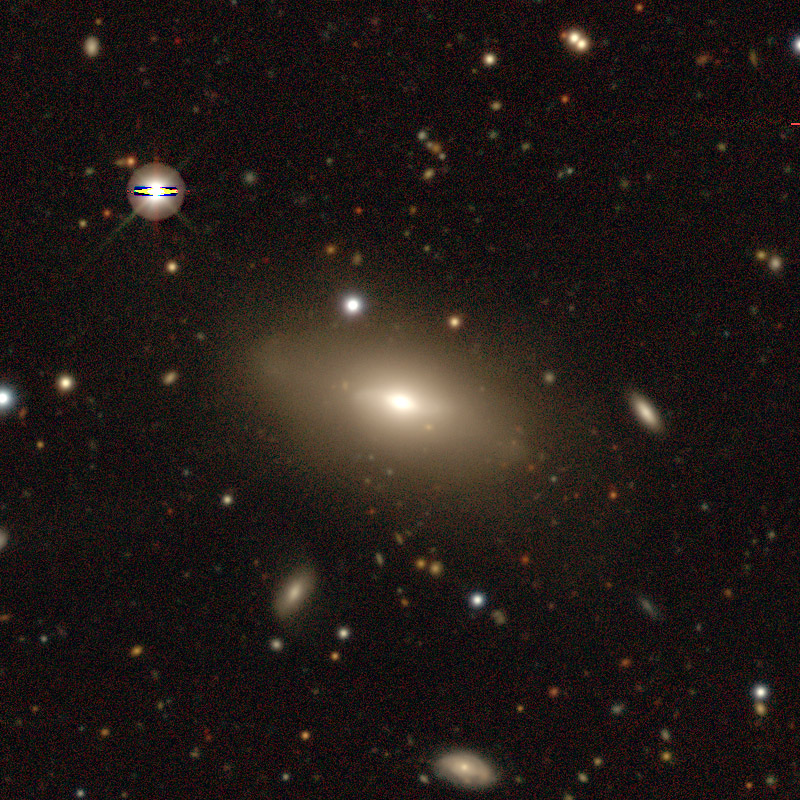
- NGC 7169 from the Legacy Surveys DR10 project.

Observation data (J2000 epoch)
- Constellation: Grus
- Right ascension: 22^{h} 02^{m} 48.64^{s}
- Declination: −47° 41′ 52.2″
- Redshift: 0.033240 ± 0.000150
- Heliocentric radial velocity: 9965±45 km/s
- Distance: 469.6 ± 33.0 Mly (143.98 ± 10.12 Mpc)
- Apparent magnitude (V): 13.6
- Apparent magnitude (B): 14.6
- Surface brightness: 12.85

Characteristics
- Type: Lenticular galaxy
- Size: 58.33 kpc (190,200 ly)
- Apparent size (V): 1.0′ × 0.5′
- Notable features: Morphological type: SAB0−; E/SB0

Other designations
- NGC 7169, PGC 67913

NGC 7169 is a large and relatively distant lenticular galaxy located in the constellation of Grus. Its velocity relative to the cosmic microwave background is 9762±47 km/s, corresponding to a Hubble distance of 470 ± 33 Mly (144 ± 10 Mpc). NGC 7169 was discovered by the British astronomer John Herschel in 1834.

To date, one distance measurement that is not based on redshift gives a value of 106 Mpc (350 Mly). This value lies well outside the range expected from the Hubble distance. The NASA/IPAC database calculates the diameter of a galaxy using the mean value of independent distance measurements when they are available. Consequently, the diameter of NGC 7169 could be about 79.2 kpc (258,000 ly) if the Hubble distance were used for the calculation.

== See also ==
- List of NGC objects
