= NGC 469 =

Spiral galaxy in the constellation Pisces

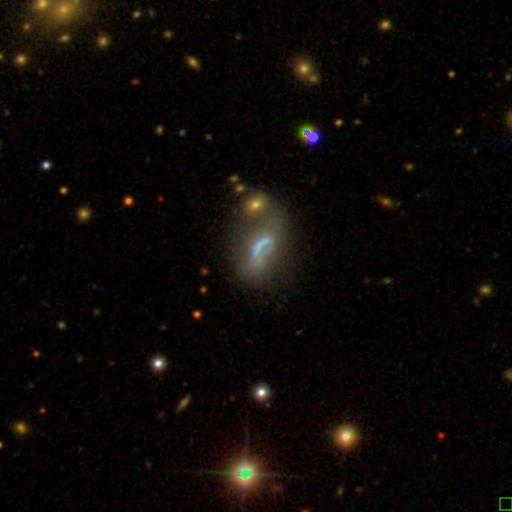
- Spiral Galaxy NGC 469

Observation data (J2000.0 epoch)
- Constellation: Pisces
- Right ascension: 01^{h} 19^{m} 33.042^{s}
- Declination: +14° 52′ 14.78″
- Redshift: 0.01371
- Heliocentric radial velocity: 4083 ± 14 km/s
- Distance: 469 Mly
- Apparent magnitude (V): 14.3
- Apparent magnitude (B): 15.1

Characteristics
- Type: Sd
- Apparent size (V): 0.67′ × 0.52′

Other designations
- MCG +02-04-023, PGC 4753

NGC 469 is a spiral galaxy in the constellation Pisces. Located approximately 167 million light-years from Earth, it was discovered by Albert Marth in 1864.

== See also ==
- List of galaxies
- List of spiral galaxies
