= NGC 472 =

Spiral galaxy in the constellation Pisces

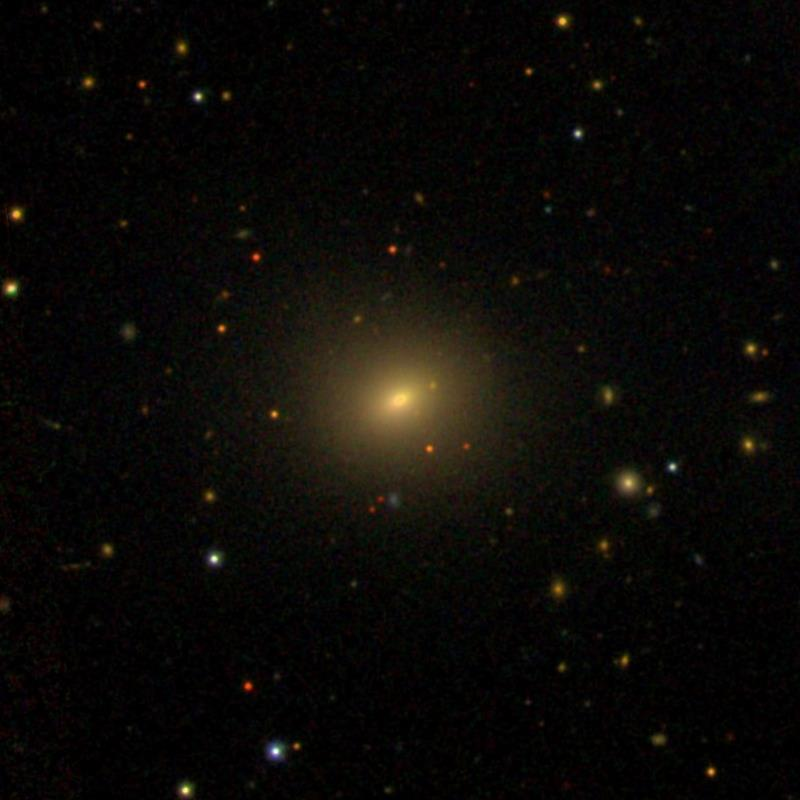
- SDSS recording of NGC 472

Observation data (J2000 epoch)
- Constellation: Pisces
- Right ascension: 01^{h} 20^{m} 26.68^{s}
- Declination: +32° 42′ 32.3″
- Redshift: 0.017646
- Heliocentric radial velocity: 5,243 km/s
- Distance: 220 Mly
- Apparent magnitude (V): 14.0

Characteristics
- Type: Sb
- Apparent size (V): 0.8' × 0.6'

Other designations
- UGC 870, 2MASX J01202867+3242322, PGC 4833

NGC 472 is a spiral galaxy located roughly 220 million lightyears from earth in the constellation Pisces. It was discovered on August 29, 1862 by Heinrich Louis d'Arrest.

== See also ==
- List of galaxies
- List of spiral galaxies
