= NGC 958 =

Galaxy in the constellation Cetus

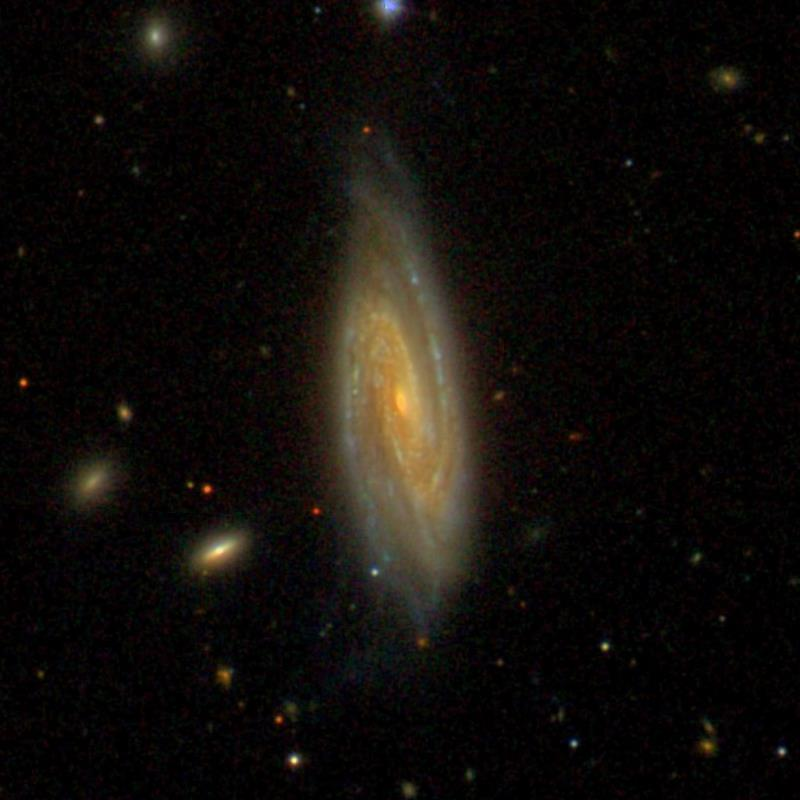
- NGC 958 imaged by SDSS

Observation data (J2000 epoch)
- Constellation: Cetus
- Right ascension: 02^{h} 30^{m} 42.8350^{s}
- Declination: −02° 56′ 20.126″
- Redshift: 0.019150
- Heliocentric radial velocity: 5741 ± 2 km/s
- Distance: 264.8 ± 18.6 Mly (81.20 ± 5.69 Mpc)
- Apparent magnitude (V): 12.2

Characteristics
- Type: SB(rs)c?
- Size: ~161,200 ly (49.43 kpc) (estimated)
- Apparent size (V): 2.9′ × 0.9′

Other designations
- IRAS 02281-0309, 2MASX J02304283-0256204, MCG -01-07-019, PGC 9560

NGC 958 is a barred spiral galaxy in the constellation of Cetus. Its velocity with respect to the cosmic microwave background is 5505 ± 17 km/s, which corresponds to a Hubble distance of 81.20 ± 5.69 Mpc (~265 million light-years). However, 19 non-redshift measurements give a closer distance of 58.93 ± 12.91 Mpc (~192 million light-years). The galaxy was discovered by German-British astronomer William Herschel on 20 September 1784.

NGC 958 is a Seyfert II Galaxy, i.e. it has a quasar-like nuclei with very high surface brightnesses whose spectra reveal strong, high-ionisation emission lines, but unlike quasars, the host galaxy is clearly detectable. The NASA/IPAC Extragalactic Database (NED) lists NGC 958 as a luminous infrared galaxy (LIRG).

== Supernovae ==
Three supernovae have been observed in NGC 958:

- SN 2005A (Type Ia, mag. 17.1) was discovered by the Lick Observatory Supernova Search (LOSS) on 5 January 2005.
- SN 2022ao (Type Ic, mag. 17.997) was discovered by ATLAS on 5 January 2022.
- SN 2022acbu (Type II, mag. 20.34) was discovered by the Zwicky Transient Facility on 30 November 2022.

== See also ==
- List of NGC objects (1–1000)
