= NGC 116 =

Galaxy in the constellation Cetus

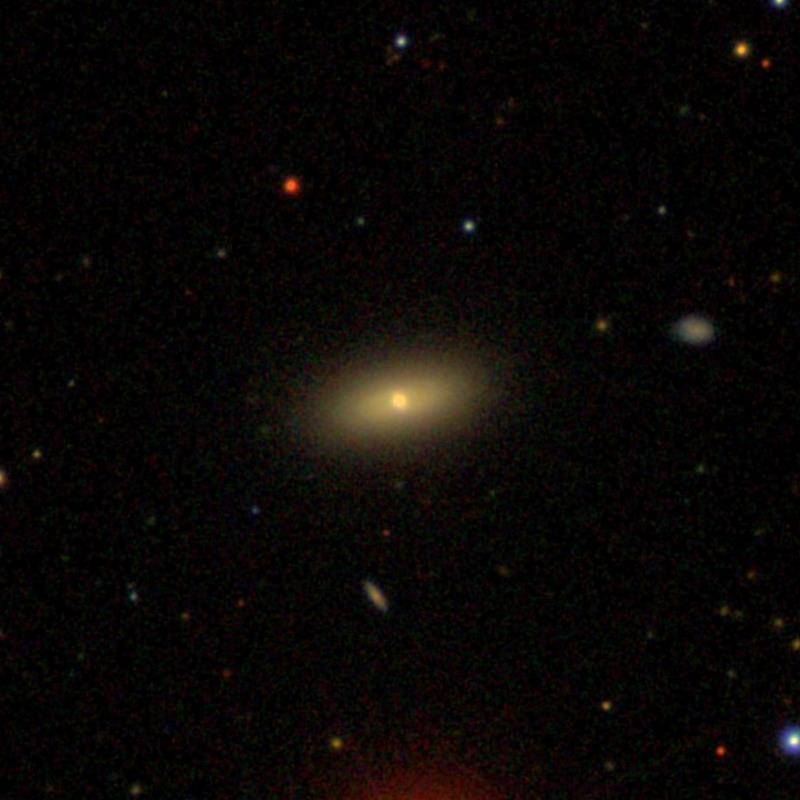
- SDSS image of NGC 116

Observation data (J2000 epoch)
- Constellation: Cetus
- Right ascension: 00^{h} 27^{m} 05.221^{s}
- Declination: −07° 40′ 05.91″

Other designations
- PGC 1671

NGC 116 is a possibly lost or "non-existent" object in the constellation Cetus. This object is up for debate and has been considered to possibly be PGC 1671. The NED entry for this object contains the note NGC identification is very uncertain.

== See also ==
- List of NGC objects
