= Gravitational collapse =

Contraction of an astronomical object due to the influence of its gravity

As a massive star evolves, it forms onion-layered shells of fusing elements (a). When the inert iron core reaches an unsustainable mass, it collapses into neutrons (b–c). The descending matter rebounds (d–f), forming a Type II supernova

Gravitational collapse is the contraction of an astronomical object due to the influence of its own gravity, which tends to draw matter inward toward the center of gravity. Gravitational collapse is a fundamental mechanism for structure formation in the universe. Over time an initial, relatively smooth distribution of matter, after sufficient accretion, may collapse to form pockets of higher density, such as stars or black holes.

Star formation involves a gradual gravitational collapse of interstellar medium into clumps of molecular clouds and potential protostars. The compression caused by the collapse raises the temperature until thermonuclear fusion occurs at the center of the star, at which point the collapse gradually comes to a halt as the outward thermal pressure balances the gravitational forces. The star then exists in a state of thermodynamic equilibrium. During the star's evolution a star might collapse again and reach several new states of equilibrium.

== Star formation ==
An interstellar cloud of gas will remain in hydrostatic equilibrium as long as the kinetic energy of the gas pressure is in balance with the potential energy of the internal gravitational force. Mathematically this is expressed using the virial theorem, which states that to maintain equilibrium, the gravitational potential energy must equal twice the internal thermal energy. If a pocket of gas is massive enough that the gas pressure is insufficient to support it, the cloud will undergo gravitational collapse. The critical mass above which a cloud will undergo such collapse is called the Jeans mass. This mass depends on the temperature and density of the cloud but is typically thousands to tens of thousands of solar masses.

== Stellar remnants ==
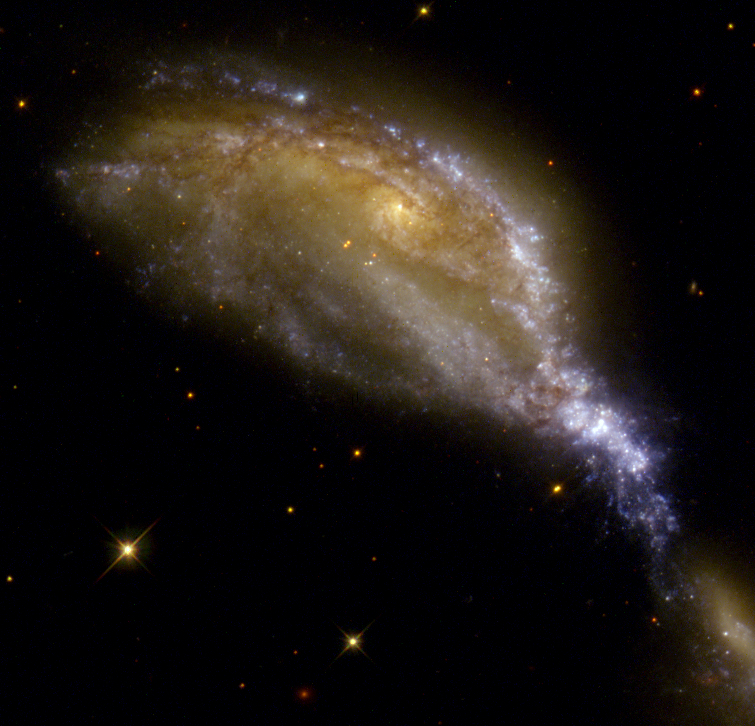
NGC 6745 produces material densities sufficiently extreme to trigger star formation through gravitational collapse

At what is called the star's death (when a star has consumed its supply of fuel), it will undergo a contraction that can be halted only if it reaches a new state of equilibrium. Depending on the mass during its lifetime, these stellar remnants can take one of three forms:

- White dwarfs, in which gravity is opposed by electron degeneracy pressure
- Neutron stars, in which gravity is opposed by neutron degeneracy pressure and short-range repulsive neutron–neutron interactions mediated by the strong force
- Black hole, in which there is no force strong enough to resist gravitational collapse

Theoretically, there are compact exotic stars made from forms of exotic matter such as quarks or preons, but these objects remain hypothetical.

=== White dwarf ===
For isolated stars that formed with one to seven times the mass of the Sun, the final stage in their evolution is a white dwarf. The collapse of the stellar core to a white dwarf takes place over tens of thousands of years, while the star blows off its outer envelope to form a planetary nebula. A white dwarf can have a magnetic field, which may be a fossil remnant of its original stellar magnetic field. As gravitational contraction and the remaining nuclear burning contribute only a negligible amount to the energy output of a white dwarf, nearly all of the radiated luminosity comes from stored thermal energy. Thus, over time scales of billions of years, the temperature of the white dwarf will continue to decrease.

If it has a close orbiting companion star, a white dwarf-sized object can accrete matter from the companion, increasing the mass and potentially spinning it up. When sufficient hydrogen has been accumulated along the outer shell, it can detonate to form a nova. Since the white dwarf is not disrupted by the explosion, this cycle can occur repeatedly. Despite the thermonuclear explosion, some of the accumulated matter can be retained, allowing the white dwarf to continue to grow in mass.

The upper mass limit on the growth of a white dwarf is called the Chandrasekhar limit. This is about one and a half times the mass of the Sun, at which point gravitational collapse would start again. Before reaching this limit, the increasing density and temperature within a carbon-oxygen white dwarf initiates a new round of nuclear fusion, which is not regulated because the star's weight is supported by degeneracy rather than thermal pressure, allowing the temperature to rise exponentially. The resulting runaway carbon detonation completely blows the star apart in a Type Ia supernova.

An alternative scenario is the merger of two white dwarfs in a close binary system; the so-called double-degenerate model. When the combined mass exceeds the Chandrasekhar limit, a Type Ia supernova results.

=== Neutron star ===
Neutron stars are formed by the gravitational collapse of the cores of massive stars. They are the remnant of supernova types Ib, Ic, and II. Neutron stars are expected to have a skin or "atmosphere" of normal matter on the order of a millimeter thick, underneath which they are composed almost entirely of closely packed neutrons called neutron matter with a slight dusting of free electrons and protons mixed in. This degenerate neutron matter has a density of about 6.65×10^{17} kg/m^{3}.

The appearance of stars composed of exotic matter and their internal layered structure is unclear since any proposed equation of state of degenerate matter is highly speculative. Other forms of hypothetical degenerate matter may be possible, and the resulting quark stars, strange stars (a type of quark star), and preon stars, if they exist, would, for the most part, be indistinguishable from a neutron star: in most cases, the exotic matter would be hidden under a crust of "ordinary" degenerate neutrons.

=== Black holes ===
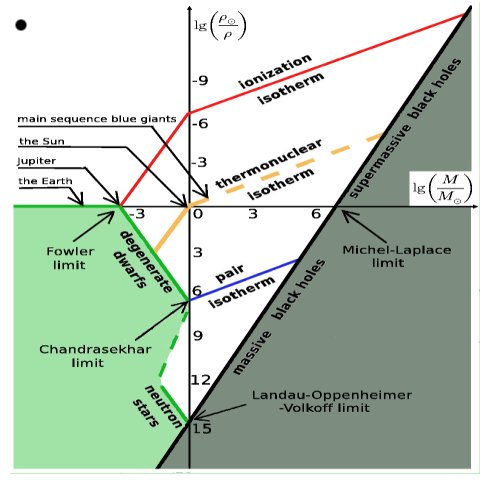
Logarithmic plot of mass against mean density (with solar values as origin) showing possible kinds of stellar equilibrium state. For a configuration in the shaded region, beyond the black hole limit line, no equilibrium is possible, so runaway collapse will be inevitable.

According to Einstein's theory, for objects with masses above the Tolman–Oppenheimer–Volkoff limit (roughly double the mass of the Sun), no known form of cold (non-fusing) matter can provide the repulsive force needed to oppose gravity in a new dynamical equilibrium. Hence, the gravitational collapse continues unhindered.

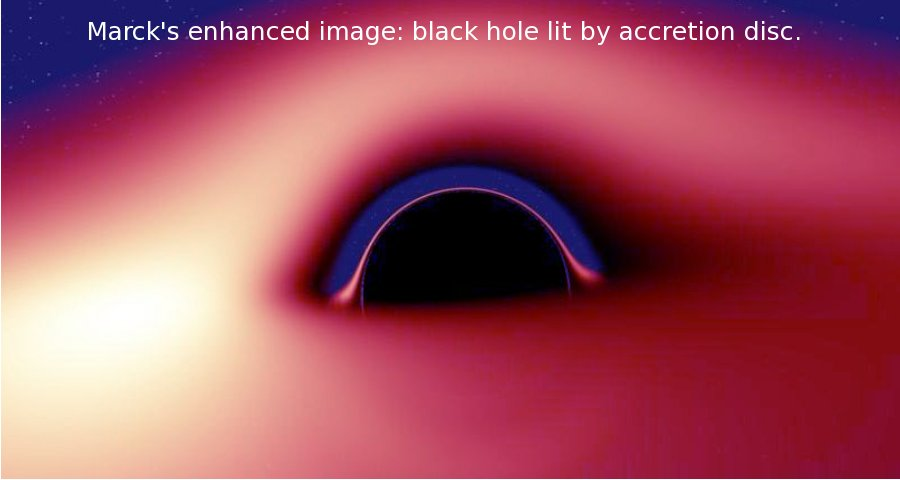
Simulated view from outside black hole with thin accretion disc

Once a body collapses to within its Schwarzschild radius, it forms what is termed a black hole, meaning a spacetime region from which not even light can escape. It follows from general relativity and the theorem of Roger Penrose that the subsequent formation of some kind of singularity is inevitable. Nevertheless, according to Penrose's cosmic censorship hypothesis, the singularity will be confined within the event horizon bounding the black hole, so the spacetime region outside will still have a well-behaved geometry, with strong but finite curvature, that is expected to evolve towards a rather simple form describable by the historic Schwarzschild metric in the spherical limit and by the more recently discovered Kerr metric if angular momentum is present. If the precursor has a magnetic field, it is dispelled during the collapse, as black holes are thought to have no magnetic field of their own.

On the other hand, the nature of the kind of singularity to be expected inside a black hole remains rather controversial. According to theories based on quantum mechanics, at a later stage, the collapsing object will reach the maximum possible energy density for a certain volume of space or the Planck density (as there is nothing that can stop it). This is the point at which it has been hypothesized that the known laws of gravity cease to be valid. There are competing theories as to what occurs at this point. For example loop quantum gravity predicts that a Planck star would form. Regardless, it is argued that gravitational collapse ceases at that stage and a singularity, therefore, does not form.

==== Theoretical minimum radius for a star ====
The radii of larger mass neutron stars (about 2.8 solar mass) are estimated to be about 12 km, or about twice their equivalent Schwarzschild radius.

It might be thought that a sufficiently massive neutron star could exist within its Schwarzschild radius (1.0 SR) and appear like a black hole without having all the mass compressed to a singularity at the center; however, this is probably incorrect. Within the event horizon, the matter would have to move outward faster than the speed of light in order to remain stable and avoid collapsing to the center. No physical force, therefore, can prevent a star smaller than 1.0 SR from collapsing to a singularity (at least within the currently accepted framework of general relativity; this does not hold for the Einstein–Yang–Mills–Dirac system). A model for the nonspherical collapse in general relativity with the emission of matter and gravitational waves has been presented.

== See also ==
- Big Crunch
- Gravitational compression
- Stellar evolution
- Thermal runaway
