= NGC 468 =

Spiral galaxy in the constellation Pisces

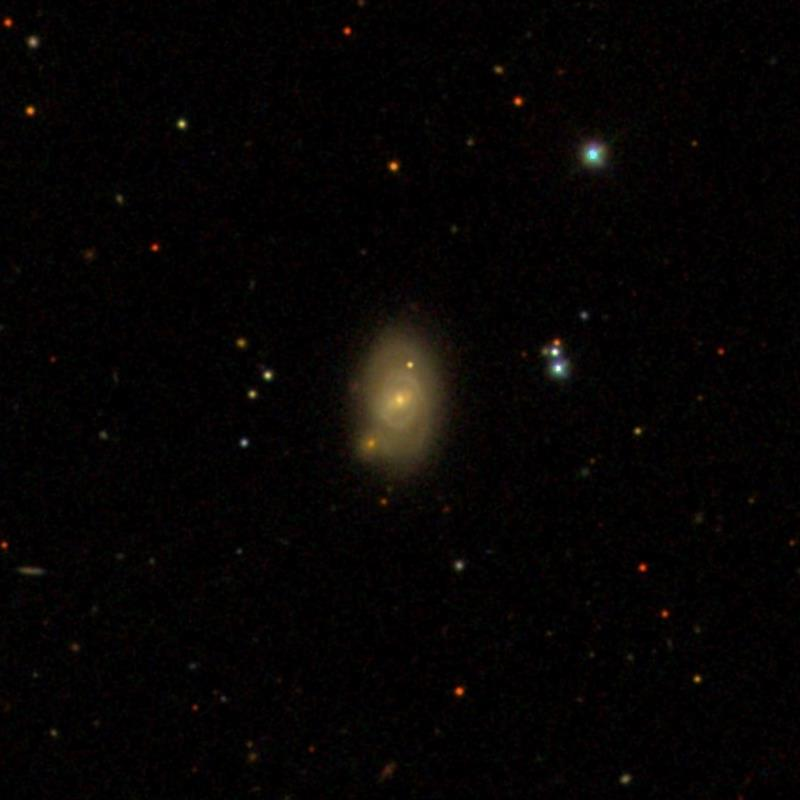
- SDSS image of NGC 468

Observation data (J2000 epoch)
- Constellation: Pisces
- Right ascension: 01^{h} 19^{m} 48.50^{s}
- Declination: +32° 46′ 04.0″
- Redshift: 0.016908
- Heliocentric radial velocity: 5026 ± 85 km/s
- Distance: 229.6 ± 16.2 Mly (70.41 ± 4.96 Mpc)
- Apparent magnitude (B): 15.19

Characteristics
- Type: S0-a

Other designations
- IC 92, MCG +05-04-020, PGC 4780

NGC 468 is a spiral galaxy in the constellation Pisces. Located approximately 209 million light-years from Earth, it was discovered by John Frederick William Herschel in 1827.

== See also ==
- List of galaxies
- List of spiral galaxies
