= NGC 2835 =

Spiral galaxy in the constellation Hydra

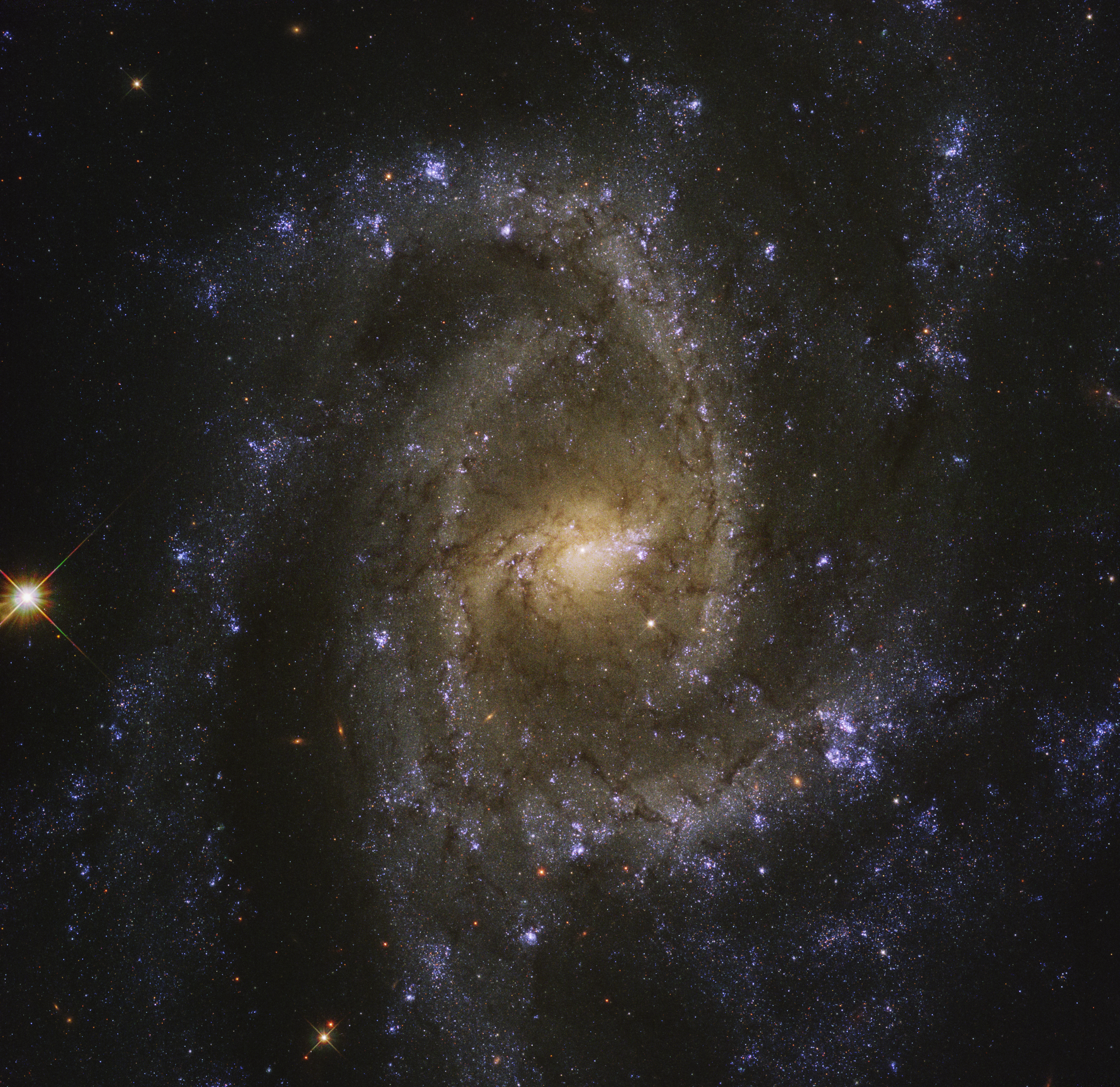
- NGC 2835 imaged by the Hubble Space Telescope

Observation data (J2000 epoch)
- Constellation: Hydra
- Right ascension: 09^{h} 17^{m} 52.7877^{s}
- Declination: −22° 21′ 16.130″
- Redshift: 0.002959 ± 0.000002
- Heliocentric radial velocity: 887 ± 1 km/s
- Distance: 33.8 ± 8.5 Mly (10.4 ± 2.6 Mpc)
- Group or cluster: NGC 2835 group (LGG 172)
- Apparent magnitude (V): 10.3

Characteristics
- Type: SAB(rs)c
- Apparent size (V): 6.6′ × 4.4′
- Notable features: Extended HIPASS source

Other designations
- ESO 564- G 035, AM 0915-220, IRAS 09156-2208, UGCA 157, MCG -04-22-008, PGC 26259

NGC 2835 is an intermediate spiral galaxy located in the constellation Hydra. It is located at a distance of circa 35 million light years from Earth, which, given its apparent dimensions, means that NGC 2835 is about 65,000 light years across. It was discovered by German astronomer Wilhelm Tempel on April 13, 1884. NGC 2835 is located only 18.5 degrees from the galactic plane.

NGC 2835 is seen nearly face-on. The galaxy features four or five spiral arms, visible in near infrared due to their population II stars. The spiral arms have also numerous HII regions and stellar associations, the larger of which are 5 arcseconds across. Although the galaxy is quite symmetric, the northern arms have HII regions that appear brighter than the southern ones. Also the southern arms appear less developed in their outer parts than the north ones. The star formation rate in NGC 2835 is 1.3 M_{☉} per year. The total stellar mass of the galaxy is 10^{10} M_{☉}. In the centre of NGC 2835 lies a supermassive black hole whose mass is estimated to be 3-10 million (10^{6.72±0.3}) M_{☉}, based on the spiral arm pitch angle.

== NGC 2835 group ==
NGC 2835 is the foremost galaxy in a small group of galaxies, the NGC 2835 group (also known as LGG 172). Other galaxies identified as members of the cluster are ESO 497-035 and ESO 565-001. A bit farther away, at projected separation of 2.2 degrees, lies NGC 2784 and its small galaxy group.

== Image gallery ==
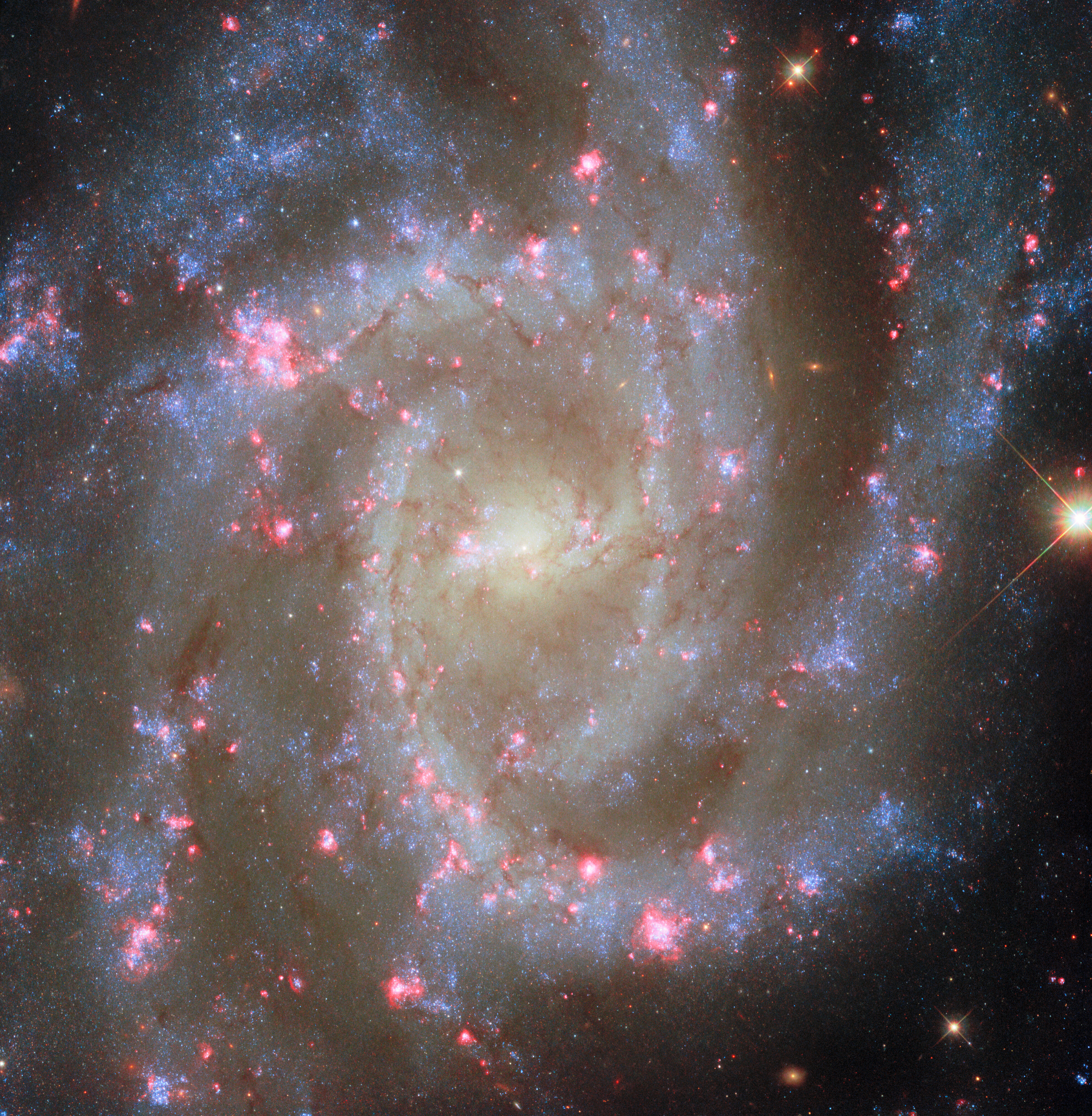
NGC 2835 imaged by the Hubble Space Telescope

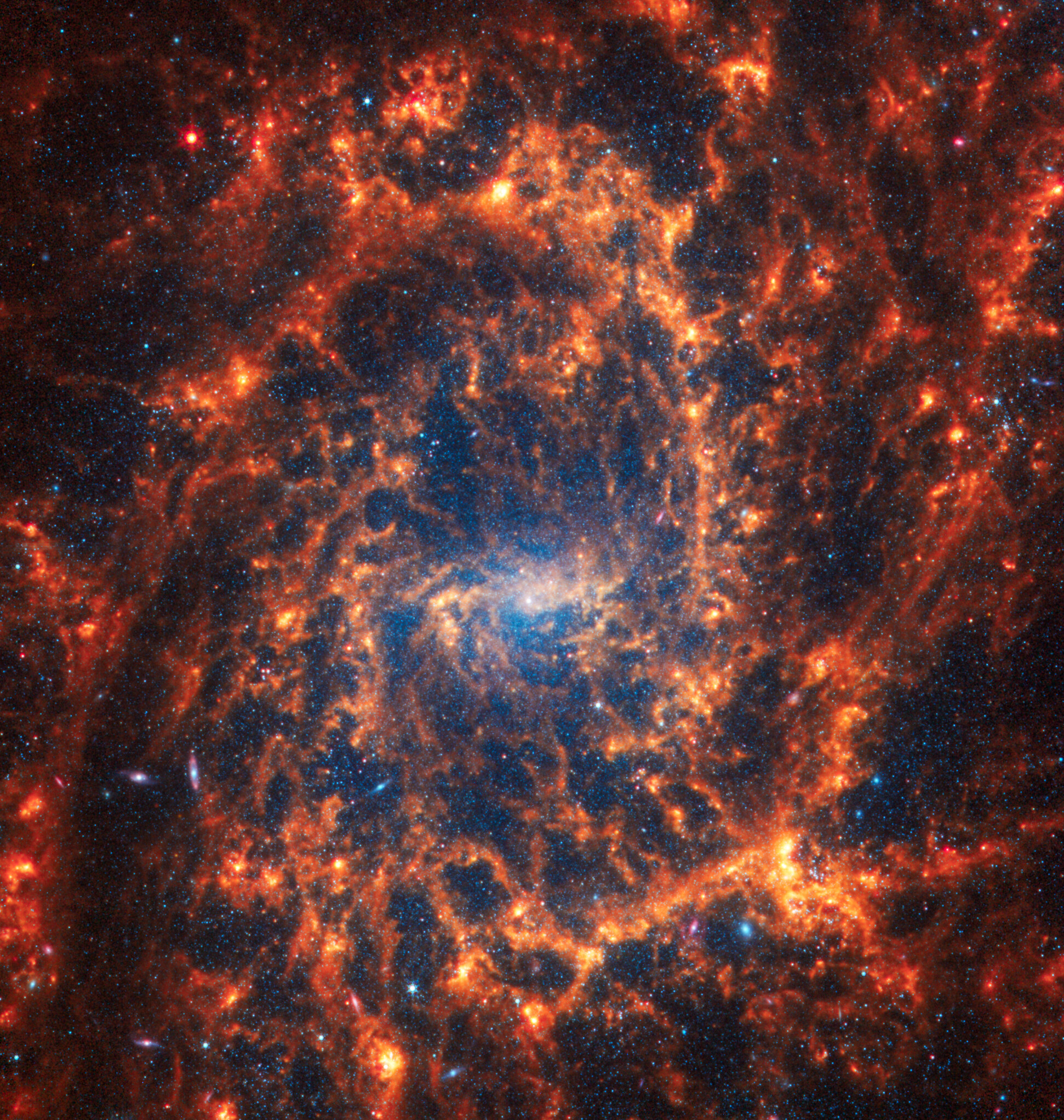
NGC 2835 imaged by the James Webb Space Telescope

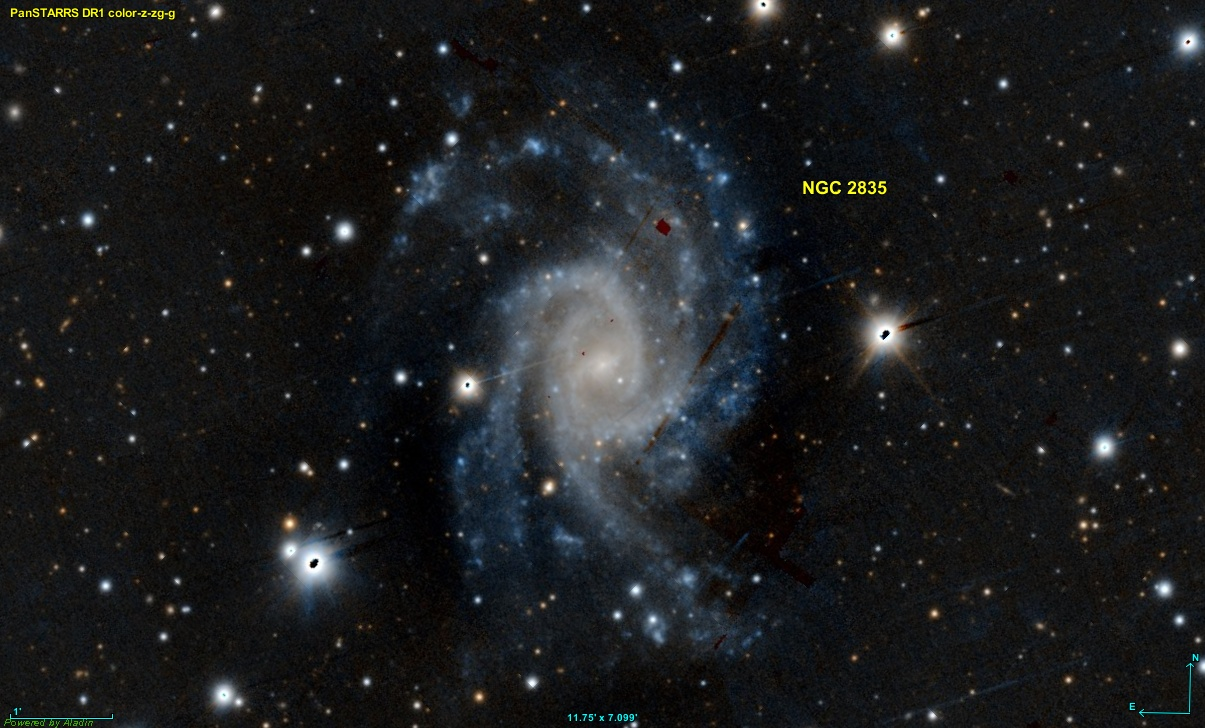
NGC 2835 imaged by Pan-STARRS

== See also ==
- NGC 5068 - another low mass spiral galaxy
- List of NGC objects (2001–3000)
