= IC 2531 =

Edge-on spiral galaxy located in the constellation Antlia

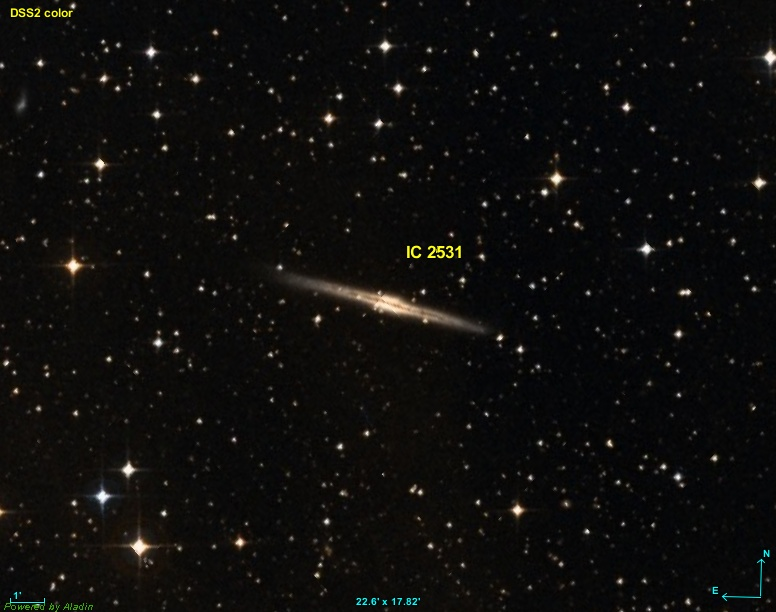
- The edge-on spiral galaxy IC 2531.

Observation data (J2000 epoch)
- Constellation: Antlia
- Right ascension: 09^{h} 59^{m} 55.50^{s}
- Declination: −29° 37′ 03.2″
- Redshift: 0.008246
- Heliocentric radial velocity: 2,472 km/s
- Distance: 134.5 Mly (41.28 Mpc)
- Apparent magnitude (V): 0.27
- Apparent magnitude (B): 0.35
- Surface brightness: 13.5

Characteristics
- Type: Sc? edge-on, HII
- Size: ~283,000 ly (86.65 kpc) (estimated)
- Apparent size (V): 7.50' × 0.90'

Other designations
- PGC 28909, ESO 435-G025, MCG -05-24-015, AM 0957-292, "little N 891"

IC 2531 is an edge-on spiral galaxy located in the constellation of Antlia. It is located 130 million light years from Earth. It was discovered by American astronomer Lewis Swift on 15 February 1898. The galaxy has been called by its nickname "little N 891" because of its resemblance to another edge-on spiral, NGC 891. However IC 2531 is twice as large.

IC 2531 contains a broad HI line. In addition, it has a luminosity class of III and regions of ionized hydrogen.

== Characteristics ==
IC 2531 is classified a late-type galaxy with a projected megaparsec of 36.8. It has an Sb morphological classification. It is seen edge-on and contains a dust lane found separating its main body into two equal components. It has a presence of filamentary features reaching its galactic halo and high circular velocity of v_{max} = 260.5 km^{−1}. IC 2531 also contains a low far-infrared flux expecting a relatively low contamination of disk light by its young star population.

What is striking about IC 2531, is the fact that its galactic budge has a peculiar box/peanut-shaped structure. Through analyzations of its atomic hydrogen (HI) content as part of the Herschel observations, a total mass of 1.37 × 10^{10} M_{Θ} was calculated. The galaxy is also shown to have both its HI and stellar disc extending towards the northeast side. It is found having outer regions slightly wrapped along its line of sight and the plane of the sky with both inclination and position angles straying 4 degrees. Furthermore, IC 2531 shows a protruding spiral arm in its disk.

== NGC 3054 group ==
IC 2531 is a member of the NGC 3054 group. There are nine members in the group besides IC 2531 and NGC 3054, including NGC 3051, NGC 3078, NGC 3084, NGC 3089, IC 2537, and two other galaxies from the European Southern Observatory Catalog, namely ESO 499-26 and ESO 499–325. IC 2531 is the largest member.
