= NGC 5001 =

Galaxy in the constellation Ursa Major

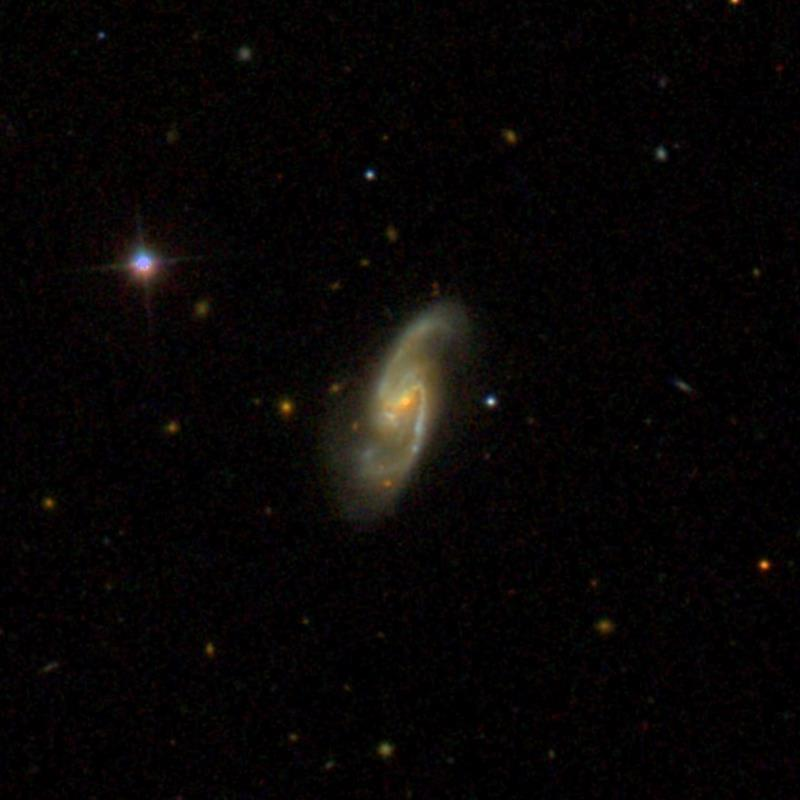
- SDSS image of NGC 5001

Observation data (J2000 epoch)
- Constellation: Ursa Major
- Right ascension: 13^{h} 09^{m} 33.1^{s}
- Declination: +53° 29′ 39″
- Redshift: 0.030311±0.000113
- Heliocentric radial velocity: 9087±34 km/s
- Galactocentric velocity: 9184±34 km/s
- Apparent magnitude (V): +12.829
- Absolute magnitude (V): -22.74

Characteristics
- Type: SBb
- Apparent size (V): 1.3′ × 0.4′

Other designations
- UGC 8243, MCG 9-22-22, ZWG 271.20, PGC 45631 and IRAS 13074+5345
- References: NASA/IPAC extragalactic datatbase, http://spider.seds.org/

NGC 5001 is a barred spiral galaxy located in the constellation Ursa Major. It is designated as SB in the galaxy morphological classification scheme. It was discovered by John Herschel on 1 May 1831. It is at a distance of 130 million parsecs from the Earth.

== See also ==
- List of NGC objects (5001–6000)
- List of NGC objects
- List of spiral galaxies
