= Gravitational compression =

Compression of a massive object by its own gravity

In astrophysics, gravitational compression is a phenomenon in which gravity, acting on the mass of an object, compresses it, reducing its size and increasing the object's density.

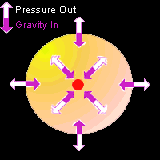
In the core of a star such as the Sun, gravitational pressure is balanced by the outward thermal pressure from fusion reactions, temporarily halting gravitational compression.

At the center of a planet or star, gravitational compression produces heat by the Kelvin–Helmholtz mechanism. This is the mechanism that explains how Jupiter continues to radiate heat produced by its gravitational compression.

The most common reference to gravitational compression is stellar evolution. The Sun and other main-sequence stars are produced by the initial gravitational collapse of a molecular cloud. Assuming the mass of the material is large enough, gravitational compression reduces the size of the core, increasing its temperature until hydrogen fusion can begin. This hydrogen-to-helium fusion reaction releases energy that balances the inward gravitational pressure and the star becomes stable for millions of years. No further gravitational compression occurs until the hydrogen is nearly used up, reducing the thermal pressure of the fusion reaction. At the end of the Sun's life, gravitational compression will turn it into a white dwarf.

At the other end of the scale are massive stars. These stars burn their fuel very quickly, ending their lives as supernovae, after which further gravitational compression will produce either a neutron star or a black hole from the remnants.

For planets and moons, equilibrium is reached when the gravitational compression is balanced by a pressure gradient. This pressure gradient is in the opposite direction due to the strength of the material, at which point gravitational compression ceases.
