= Arp 240 =

Pair of interacting galaxies in the constellation Virgo

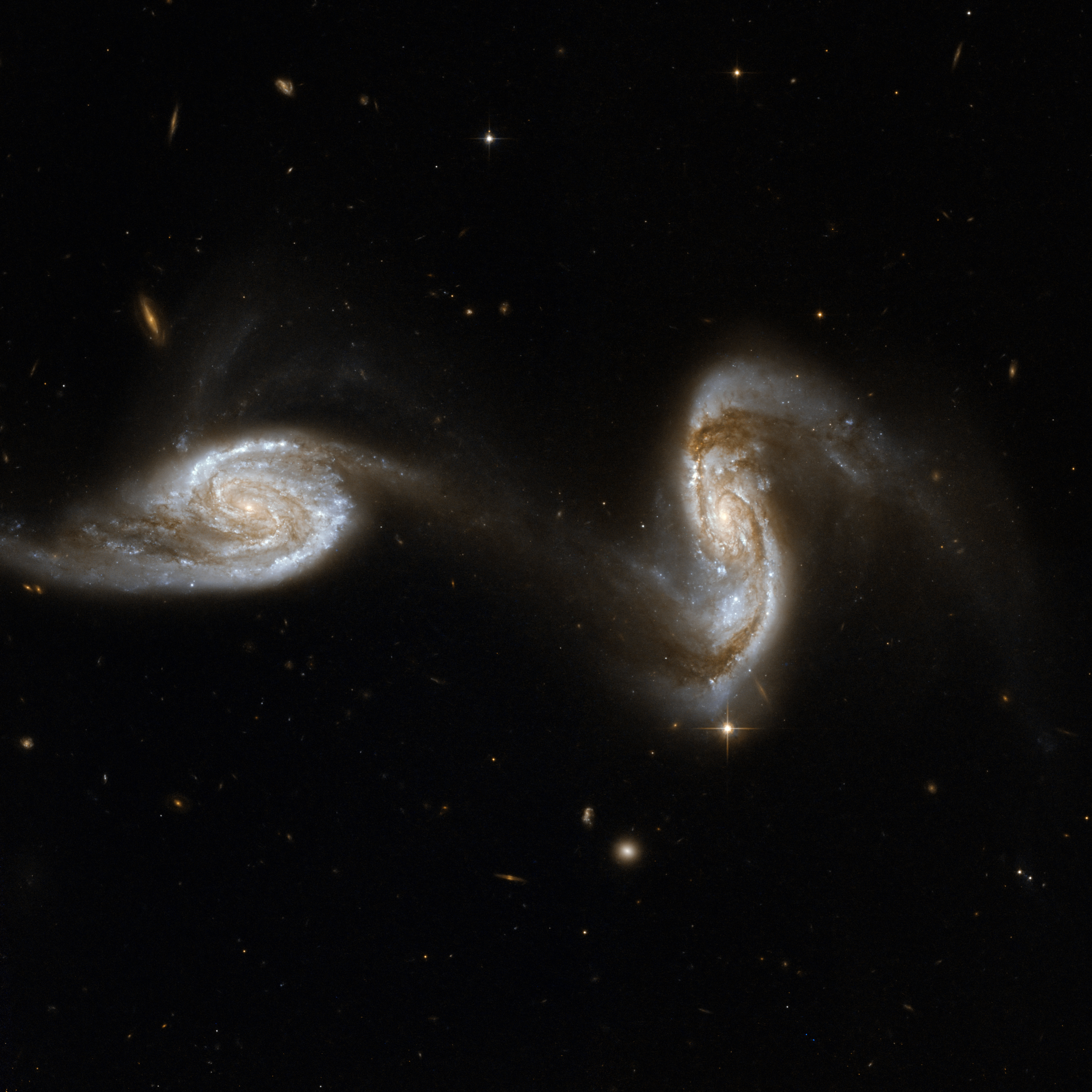
- Arp 240. The two galaxies are NGC 5257 (right) and NGC 5258 (left).

Observation data (J2000 epoch)
- Constellation: Virgo
- Right ascension: Right: 13^{h} 39^{m} 52.3^{s} Left: 13^{h} 39^{m} 57.7^{s}
- Declination: Right: +00° 50′ 22″ Left: +00° 49′ 51″
- Redshift: Right: 6798 ± 9 km/s Left: 6757 ± 1 km/s
- Distance: Right: 345.1 Mly (105.8 Mpc); Left: 342.1 Mly (104.9 Mpc)
- Apparent magnitude (V): 12.9 / 12.9

Characteristics
- Type: Right: SAB(s)b pec Left: SA(s)b pec
- Apparent size (V): Right: 1.8′ × 0.9′Left: 1.7′ × 1.1′
- Notable features: Interacting galaxies

Other designations
- Right: NGC 5257, UGC 8641, PGC 48330, VV 55b Left: NGC 5258, UGC 8645, PGC 48338, VV 55a

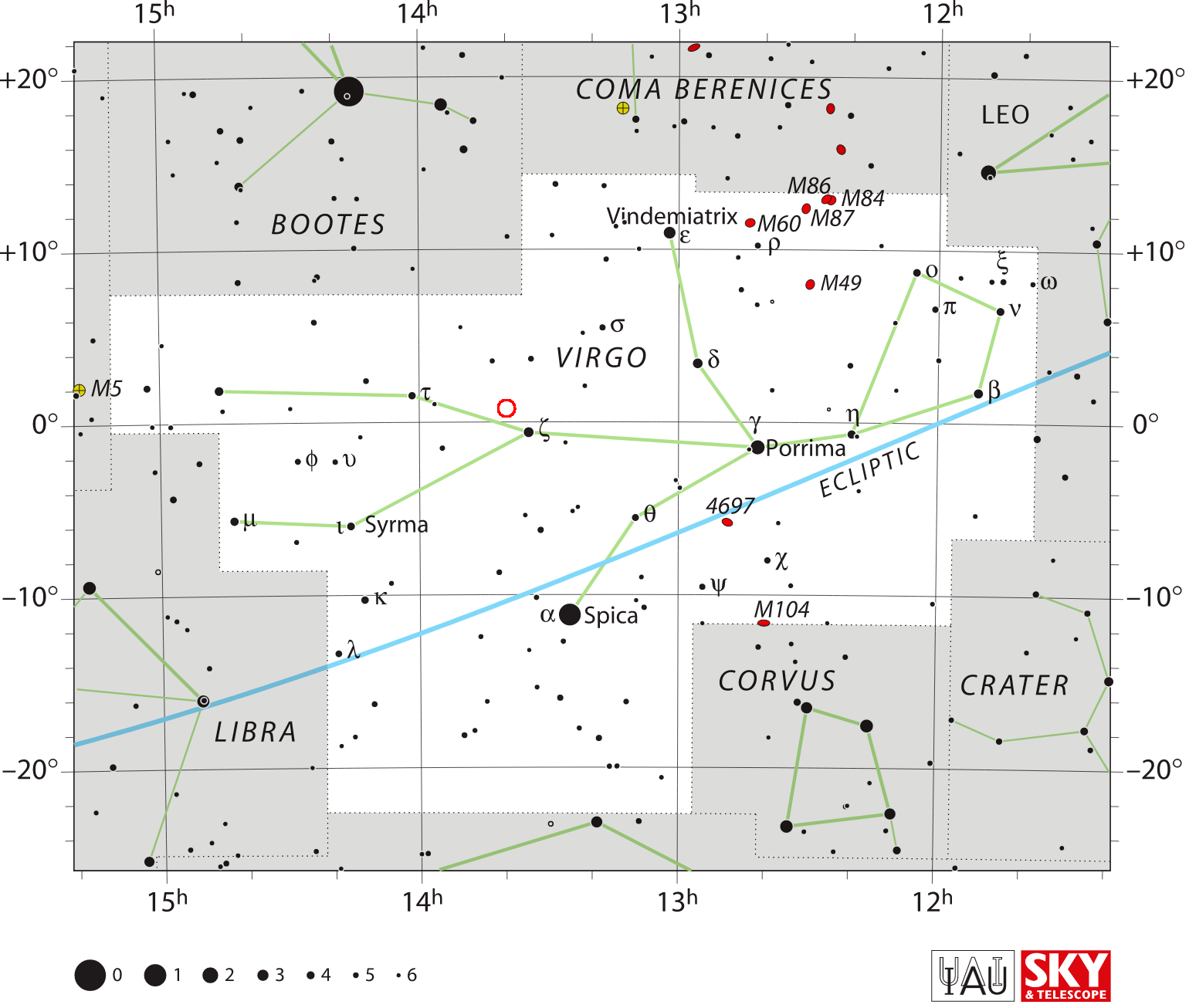
The location of Arp 240 (circled in red)

Arp 240 is a pair of interacting spiral galaxies located in the constellation Virgo. The two galaxies are listed together as Arp 240 in the Atlas of Peculiar Galaxies. The galaxy on the right is known as NGC 5257, while the galaxy on the left is known as NGC 5258. Both galaxies are distorted by the gravitational interaction, and both are connected by a tidal bridge, as can be seen in images of these galaxies.

== Supernova ==
One supernova has been observed in NGC 5258:

- SN 2020dko (Type Ia, mag. 19.1517) was discovered by the Automatic Learning for the Rapid Classification of Events (ALeRCE) on 25 February 2020.
