= J094700.09+254045.8 =

Spiral galaxy in the constellation Leo

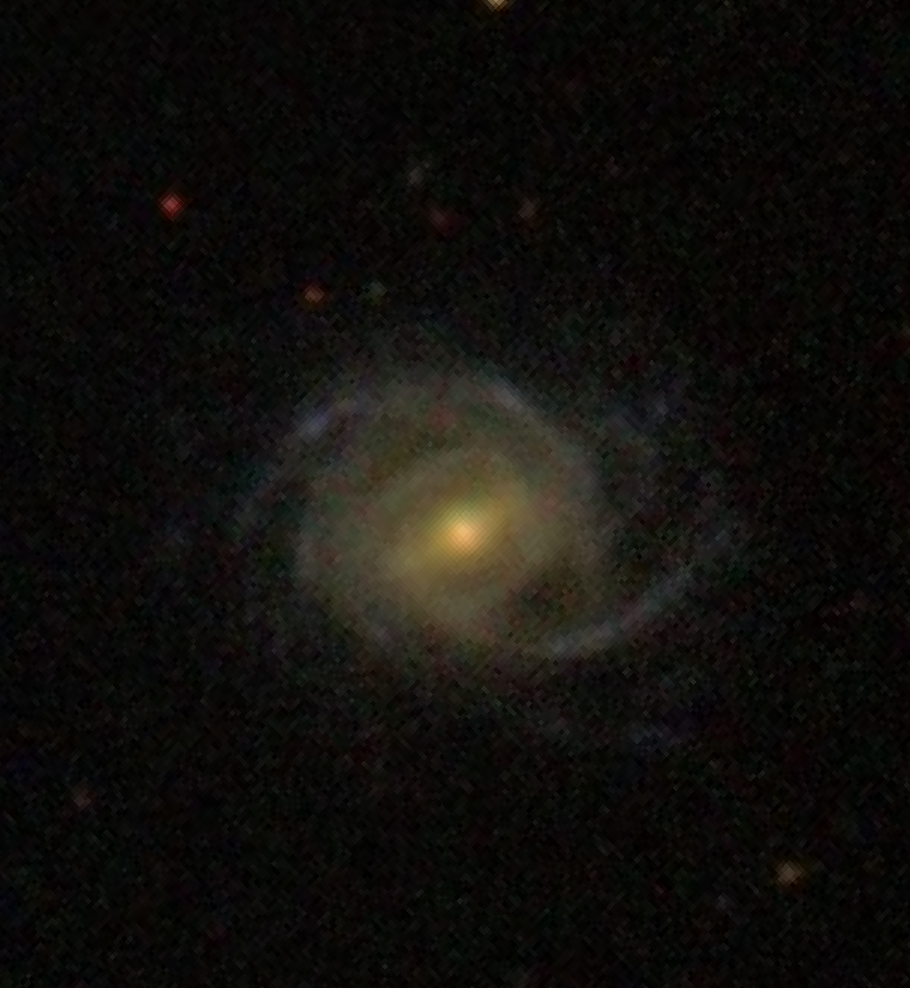
- SDSS image of J094700.09+254045.8

Observation data (J2000.0 epoch)
- Constellation: Leo
- Right ascension: 09^{h} 47^{m} 00.08^{s}
- Declination: +25° 40′ 45.82″
- Redshift: 0.109043
- Heliocentric radial velocity: 32,690 ± 6 km/s
- Distance: 1,569.6 ± 109.9 Mly (481.24 ± 33.69 Mpc)
- magnitude (J): 13.49

Characteristics
- Type: Sy1
- Size: ~622,000 ly (190.7 kpc) (estimated)

Other designations
- 2MASX J09470010+2540462, LEDA 2793671, OGC 0543, SDSS J094700.08+254045.7, ASK 593429.0, SDSS J094700.09+254045.8, [TTL2012] 443413

J094700.09+254045.8 also known as OGC 543 and SDSS J094700.08+254045.7 is a massive barred spiral galaxy located in the constellation of Leo. The redshift of the galaxy is (z) 0.109 and it is found to belong to a class of super spirals; i.e. a rare type of spiral galaxies that are more larger and distant as compared to the Milky Way.

== Description ==
J094700.09+254045.8 is classified as a grand-design spiral galaxy with defined spiral arms based on a deep convolutional neural network model that is used by astronomers in October 2022. It has a bulge fraction ratio calculated as B/T = 0.21. The galactic disk is found to have a disk inclination of 43° at a position angle of 150° and a measured disk exponential scale of 17.31.

Evidence found J094700.09+254045.8 is a Seyfert type 1 galaxy, hosting an active galactic nucleus (AGN). The inner regions of the nucleus are described to have bluer u – r colors compared to its inner disk, with further evidence of the u – r colors progressively being more bluer as the disk radius increases. The stellar population of the galaxy is found mainly dominated by both old population of stars and also a young star population based on ultraviolet and near-infrared data points. Most of the near-infrared emission appears mainly dominated by both polycyclic aromatic hydrocarbons (PAHs) and warm interstellar dust produced through star formation. The total stellar mass is estimated to be 1.8^{+0.3}_{−0.2} × 10^{11} M_{☉} while the total star formation is estimated to be 13.5 ± 0.2 M_{☉} per year based on the luminosity calculated by Wide-field Infrared Survey Explorer (WISE). A spectral energy distribution (SED) fit calculated the dust mass as 10^{8} M_{☉}. A study published in 2025, has found the galaxy has presence of molecular gas.
