= NGC 6745 =

Galaxy in the constellation Lyra

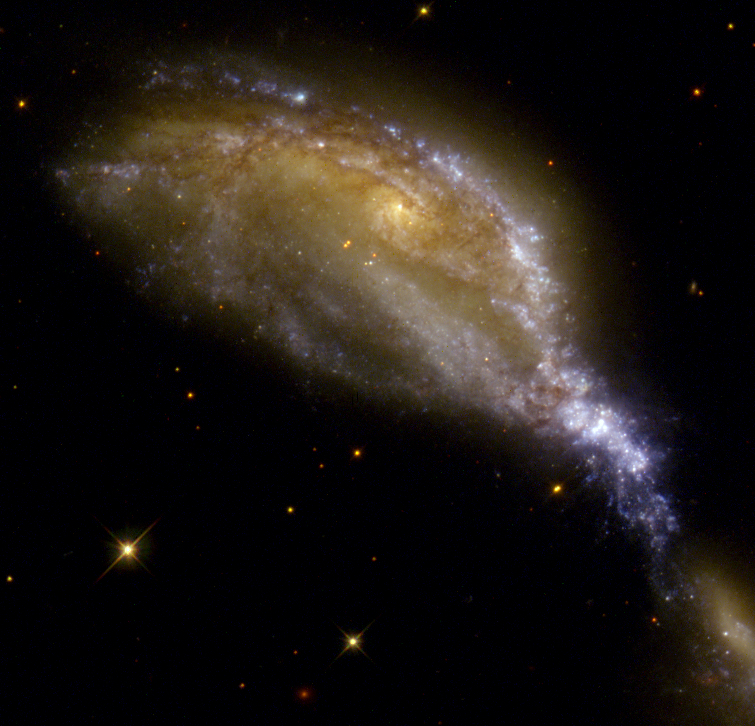
- Spiral Galaxy NGC 6745A with NGC 6745B (bottom right) imaged by the Hubble Space Telescope

Observation data (J2000 epoch)
- Constellation: Lyra
- Right ascension: 19^{h} 01^{m} 41.6000^{s}
- Declination: +40° 44′ 44.000″
- Redshift: 0.015160
- Heliocentric radial velocity: 4,545±60 km/s
- Distance: 206 Mly
- Apparent magnitude (V): 13.3

Characteristics
- Type: S?
- Apparent size (V): 1.4′

Other designations
- IRAS 19000+4040, UGC 11391, PGC 62691, CGCG 229-013, Bird's Head, NGC 6745a / 6745b / 6745c

NGC 6745 (also known as UGC 11391) is an irregular galaxy about 206 million light-years (63.5 mega-parsecs) away in the constellation Lyra. It was discovered by French astronomer Édouard Stephan on 24 July 1879.

NGC 6745 is actually a trio of galaxies in the process of colliding. The three galaxies have been colliding for hundreds of millions of years. After passing through the larger galaxy (NGC 6745A), the smaller one (NGC 6745B) is now moving away. The larger galaxy was probably a spiral galaxy before the collision, but was damaged and now appears peculiar. It is unlikely that any stars in the two galaxies collided directly because of the vast distances between them. The gas, dust, and ambient magnetic fields of the galaxies, however, do interact directly in a collision. As a result of this interaction, the smaller galaxy has probably lost most of its interstellar medium to the larger one.

== Supernovae ==
Four supernovae have been observed in NGC 6745:

- SN 1999bx (Type II, mag. 16.5) was discovered by the Lick Observatory Supernova Search (LOSS) on 26 April 1999.
- SN 2022prr (Type IIn, mag. 17.3) was discovered by ASAS-SN on 27 July 2022.
- SN 2023ucy (Type II, mag. 17.9) was discovered by the Zwicky Transient Facility on 5 October 2023.
- SN 2024ljc (Type IIb, mag. 18.736) was discovered by the Zwicky Transient Facility on 15 June 2024.

== See also ==
- IC 1296
- Antennae Galaxies
- List of NGC objects (6001–7000)
