= Big Wheel galaxy =

Large Spiral Galaxy in the early universe

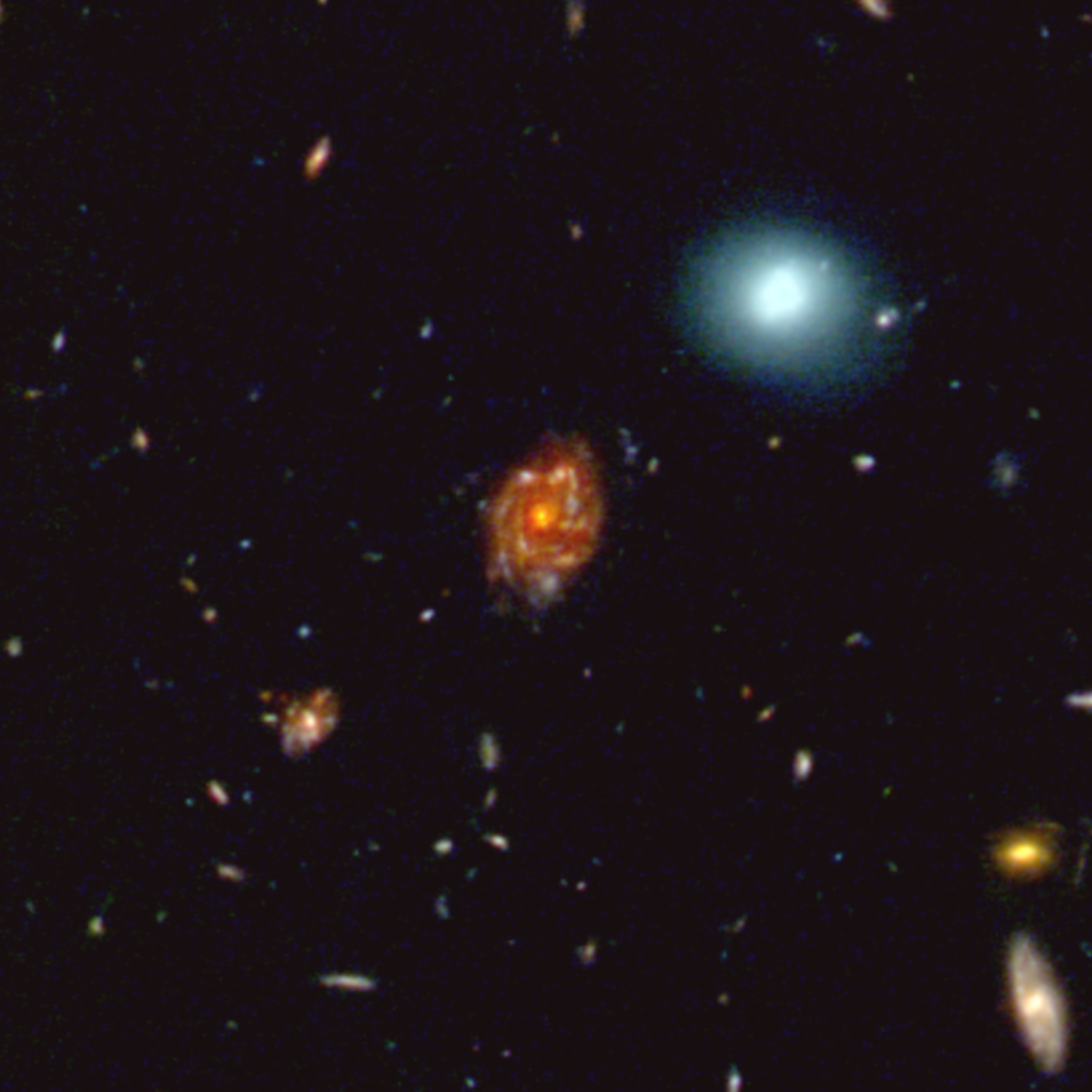
- A James Webb Space Telescope image of Big Wheel galaxy. It is the reddish spiral galaxy located at the center of the image. The blueish galaxy near the Big Wheel in the upper right corner is 50 times closer (1.5 billion Light Years) to us then the Big Wheel.

Observation data (J2000 epoch)
- Constellation: Phoenix
- Right ascension: 00^{h} 41^{m} 35.113^{s}
- Declination: −49° 37′ 12.42″
- Redshift: 3.245
- Distance: 12 billion ly (3.7 billion pc) (light travel distance); ~20 billion ly (6.1 billion pc) (present proper distance)

Characteristics
- Type: Sbc
- Mass: 370 billion M_{☉}
- Size: 100,000 ly (diameter)
- Apparent size (V): 0.02 x 0.03 moa
- Half-light radius (physical): 9.6 kpc
- Half-light radius (apparent): 1.3 arcsec

Other designations
- [PCC2024] C01

The Big Wheel galaxy is a giant spiral galaxy that existed at least as far back as 2 billion years after the Big Bang. It was accidentally discovered in 2024 in an image taken by the James Webb Space Telescope while exploring a nearby quasar. The galaxy is 12 billion light years away in the constellation Phoenix. This disk galaxy is much bigger than the other galaxies back then. This seems to challenge current models of galaxy growth in the early universe. The authors who made the discovery say that it "suggests the presence of favourable physical conditions for large-disk formation in dense environments in the early Universe".

In 2022 to 2023, research conducted by the Advanced CCD Imaging Spectrometer onboard the Chandra X-Ray Observatory concluded that this galaxy is a Seyfert galaxy because it has an active galactic nucleus.
