= NGC 3596 =

Spiral galaxy in the constellation Leo

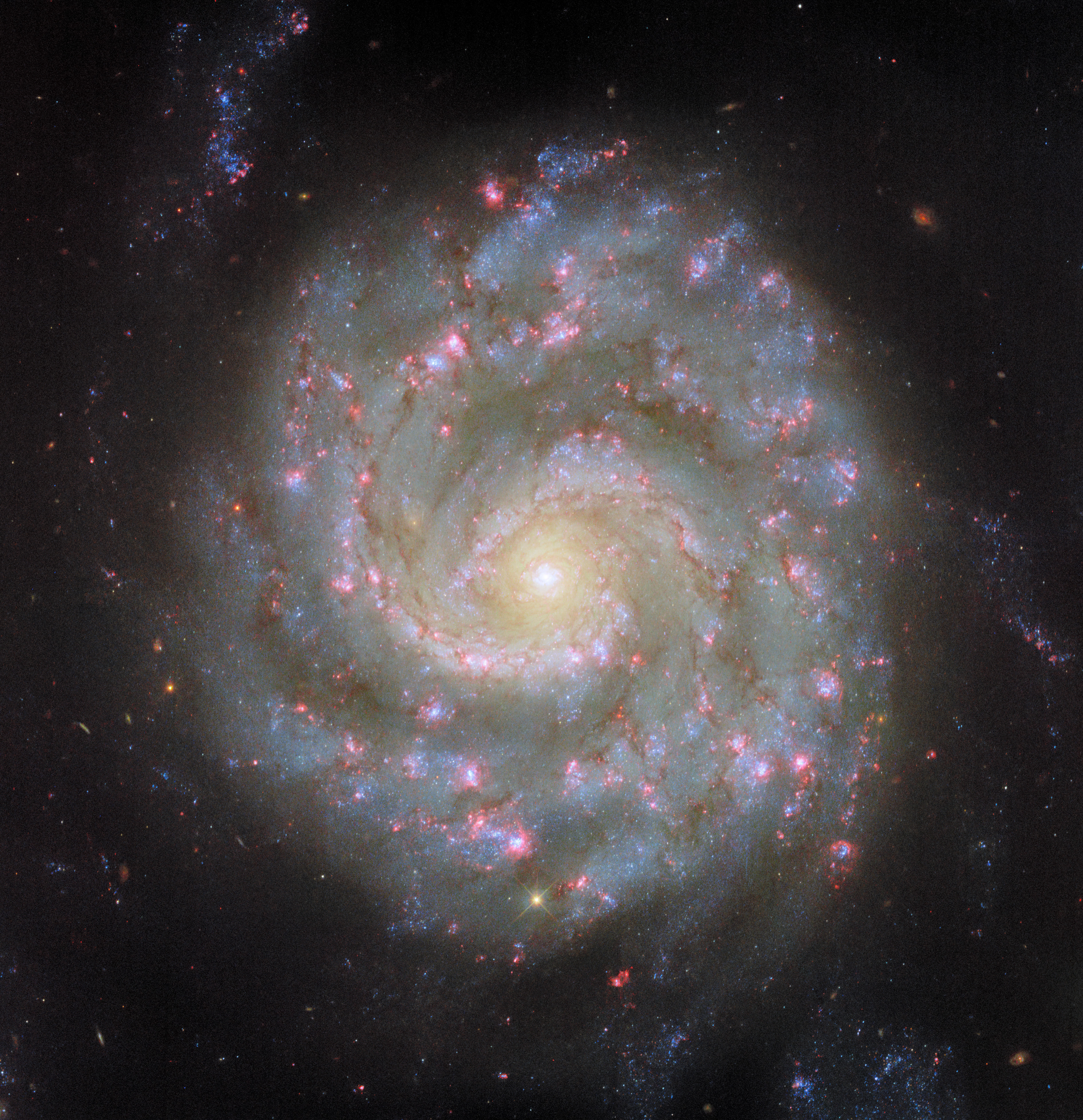
- NGC 3596 imaged by the Hubble Space Telescope

Observation data (J2000 epoch)
- Constellation: Leo
- Right ascension: 11^{h} 15^{m} 06.2152^{s}
- Declination: +14° 47′ 13.404″
- Redshift: 0.003979±0.000002
- Heliocentric radial velocity: 1,193±1 km/s
- Distance: 57.24 ± 6.82 Mly (17.550 ± 2.092 Mpc)
- Apparent magnitude (V): 12.0

Characteristics
- Type: SAB(rs)c
- Size: ~74,900 ly (22.97 kpc) (estimated)
- Apparent size (V): 4.0′ × 3.8′

Other designations
- UGC 6277, MCG +03-29-013, PGC 34298, CGCG 096-013

NGC 3596 is an intermediate spiral galaxy in the constellation Leo. It was discovered by German-British astronomer William Herschel on 8 April 1784. It is located below the star Theta Leonis (Chertan). It is a member of the Leo II Groups, a series of galaxies and galaxy clusters strung out from the right edge of the Virgo Supercluster.

== Image Gallery ==
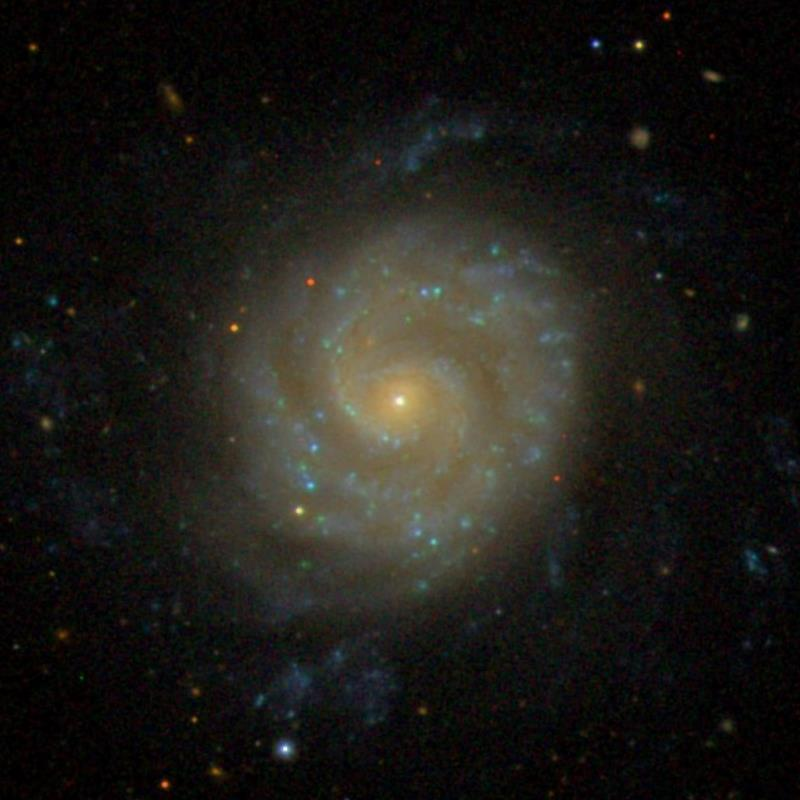
SDSS image of NGC 3596

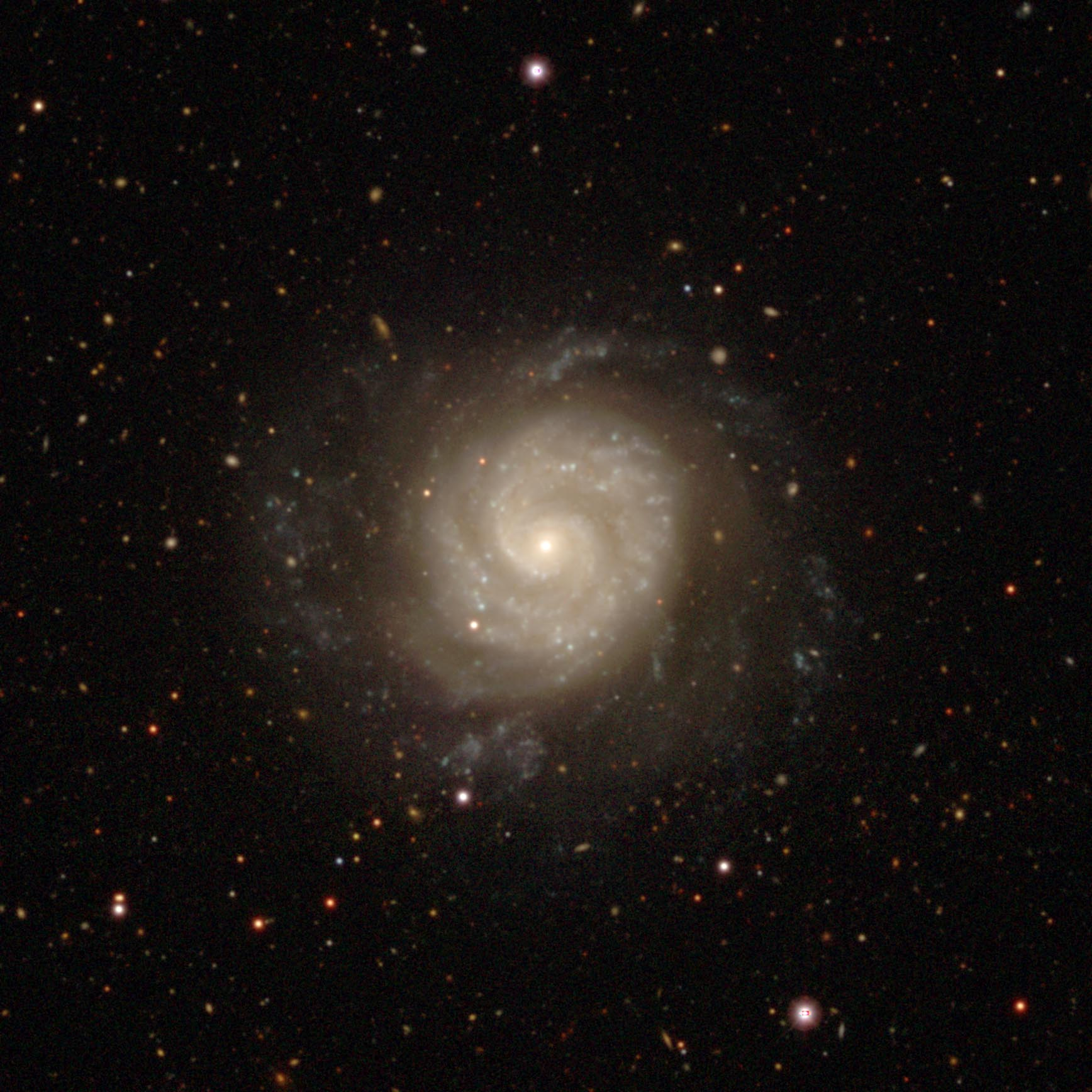
Legacy Surveys image of NGC 3596

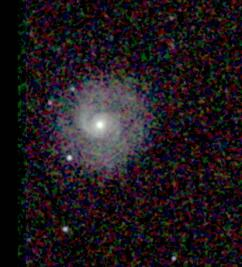
2MASS image of NGC 3596

== See also ==
- List of NGC objects (3001–4000)
