= NGC 1530 =

Galaxy in the constellation Camelopardalis

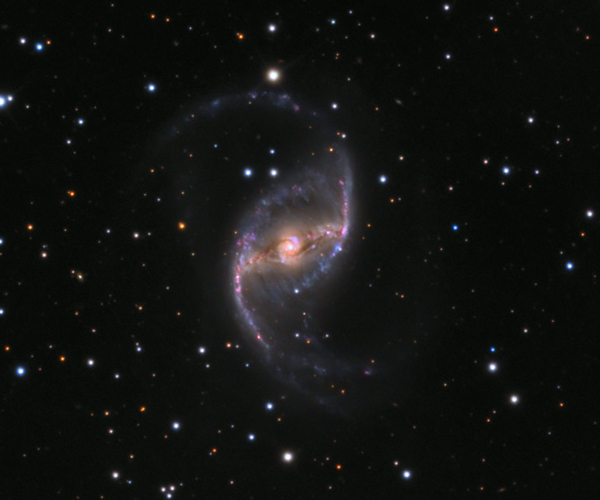

Observation data (J2000 epoch)
- Constellation: Camelopardalis
- Right ascension: 04^{h} 23^{m} 27.102^{s}
- Declination: +75° 17′ 44.05″
- Redshift: 0.008209±0.000013
- Heliocentric radial velocity: 2,459 km/s
- Galactocentric velocity: 2,622 km/s
- Distance: 65 Mly (19.9 Mpc)
- Apparent magnitude (V): 12.3
- Apparent magnitude (B): 13.40

Characteristics
- Type: SB(rs)bc
- Apparent size (V): 4.6′ × 2.4′

Other designations
- 2MASX J04232710+7517440, NGC 1530, UGC 3013, LEDA 15018, MCG +13-04-004

NGC 1530 is a barred spiral galaxy in the northern constellation of Camelopardalis. It was discovered by German astronomer W. Tempel in 1876. Danish astronomer J. L. E. Dreyer in 1888 described it only as large and pretty bright. NGC 1530 has an apparent visual magnitude of 12.3 and an angular size of 4.6′ × 2.4′. The plane of the galactic disk is inclined at an angle of 55° to the line of sight from the Earth. This galaxy is located at an estimated distance of 65 million light years, with a recessional velocity of 2,622 km/s relative to the Milky Way galaxy. It is a relatively isolated galaxy with its nearest neighbor being NGC 1530A at an angular separation of 19′.

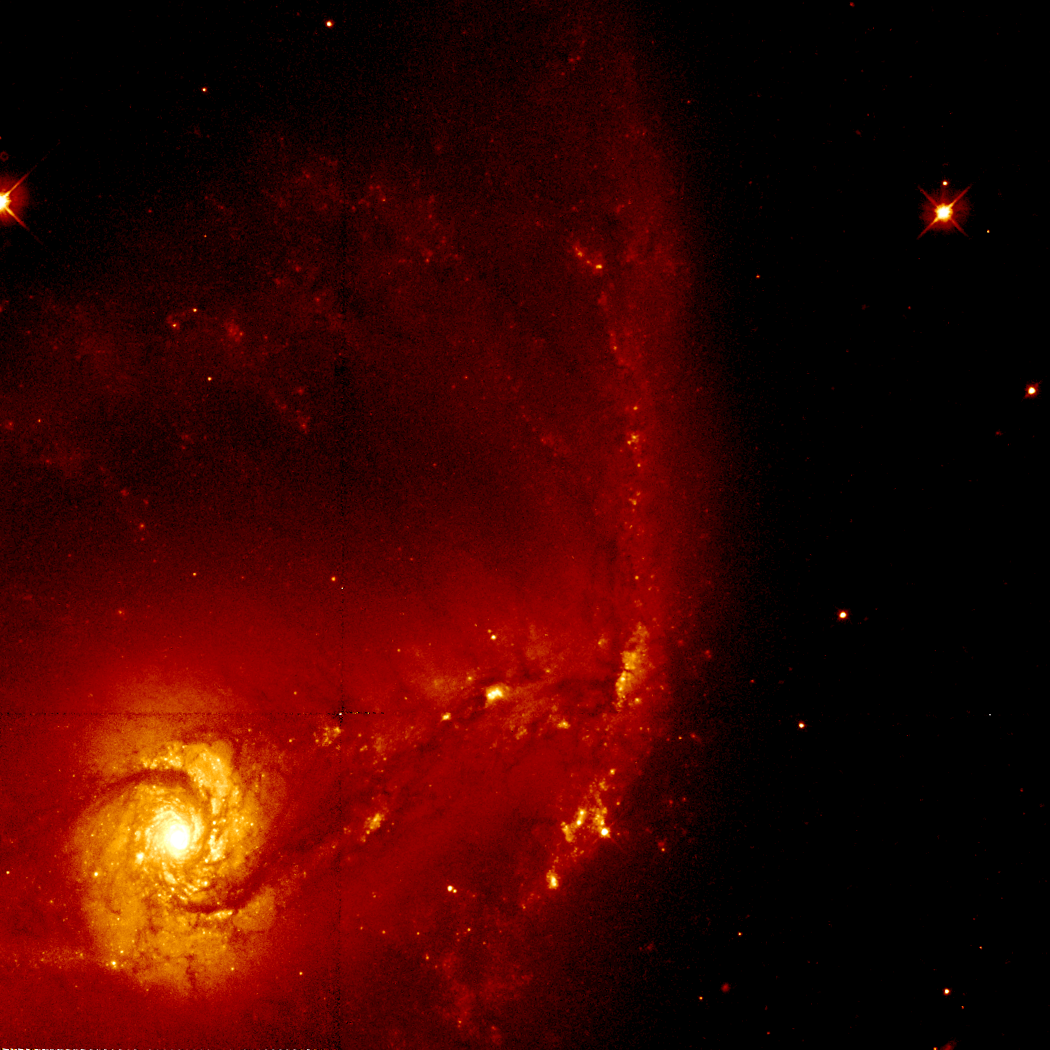
HST partial image of NGC 1530 showing the central region and part of the bar

NGC 1530 has a morphological classification of type SB(rs)bc in the de Vaucouleurs system, which means it is a barred spiral galaxy (SB) with a transitional outer ring structure (rs) that joins somewhat loosely wound arms (bc). The bar structure in this galaxy is unusually large and strong, spanning an angular size of 100″. It includes a clumpy, star-forming nuclear ring structure with a radius of 21″. Star formation is particularly high in the nucleus region and at the ends of the bar, but weak in between these locations. This activity appears to be taking place primarily on the trailing side of the bar where gas pressure is highest. Two linear dust lanes are visible along the bar, which outline shock fronts in the flow of gas.

Mass is flowing into the nuclear ring from the bar at the rate of one solar mass per year with infall velocities of up to 100 km/s. The central region has over 25% of the free gaseous hydrogen in the galaxy. There was some suggestion that the galaxy has a second, inner bar, but this instead appears to be an inner spiral structure. This spiral has one arm brighter than the other, appearing lopsided.
