= IC 1296 =

Faint spiral galaxy in the constellation Lyra

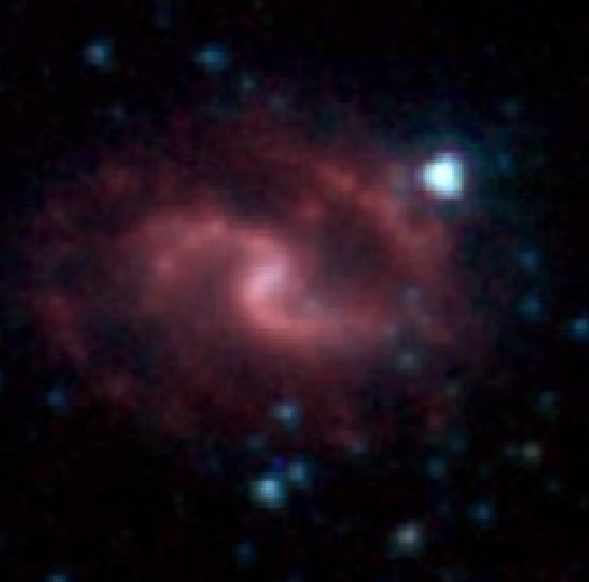
- IC 1296 imaged by the Spitzer Space Telescope

Observation data (J2000 epoch)
- Constellation: Lyra
- Right ascension: 18^{h} 53^{m} 18.8149^{s}
- Declination: +33° 03′ 59.599″
- Redshift: 0.017085
- Heliocentric radial velocity: 5,119 km/s
- Distance: 238 Mly (72.97 Mpc)
- Surface brightness: 23.63 mag/arcsec^2

Characteristics
- Type: SBbc
- Size: ~97,100 ly (29.77 kpc) (estimated)
- Apparent size (V): 1.1′ × 0.9′

Other designations
- IC 1296, UGC 11374, PGC 62532, CGCG 201-040, MCG +06-41-022, 2MASX J18531883+3303596, 2MASS J18531884+3303599

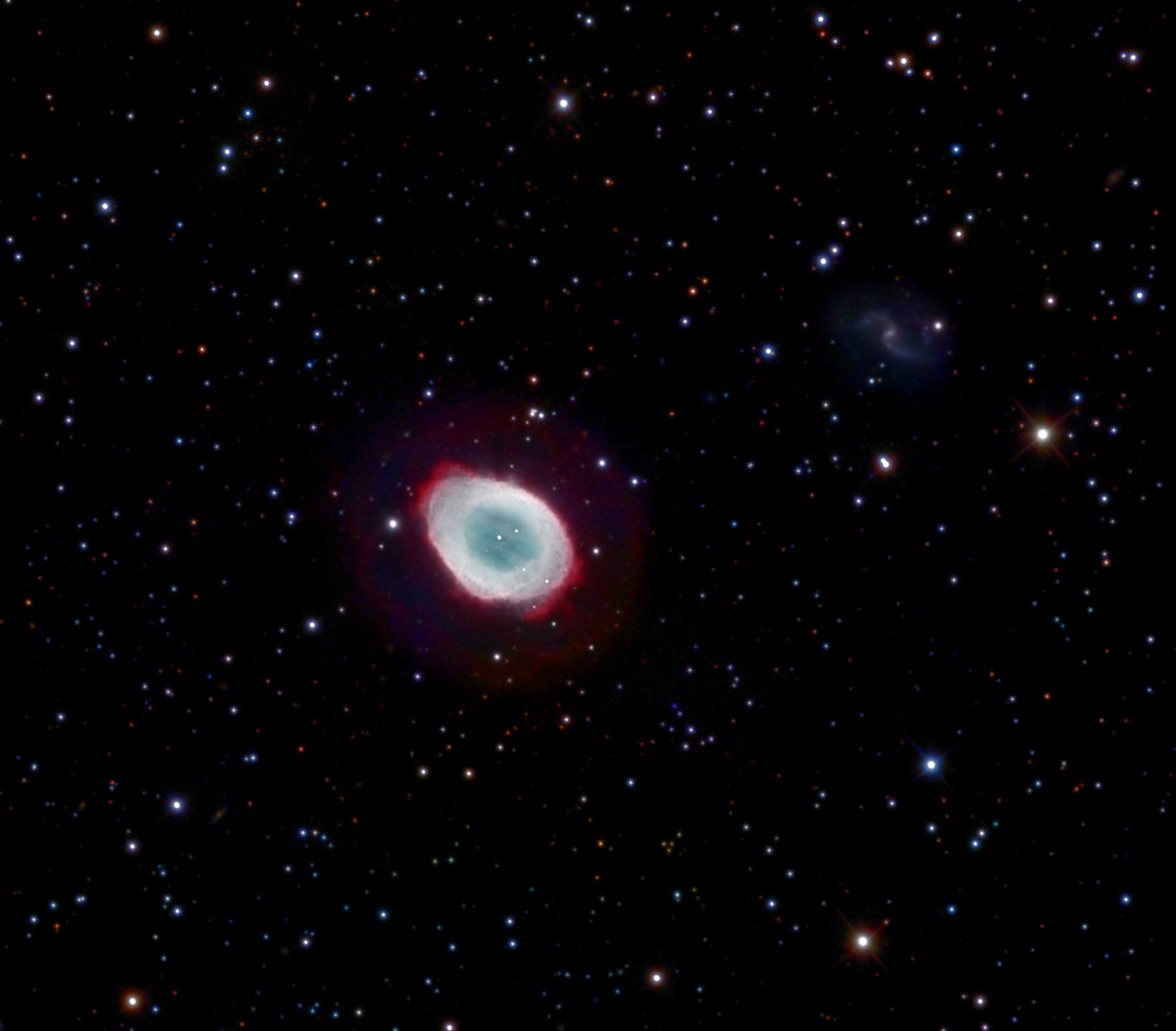
The Ring Nebula. IC 1296 is visible as the faint galaxy to the right.

IC 1296 is an extremely faint barred spiral galaxy of Hubble-type SBbc in the constellation Lyra in the northern sky. It is estimated to be 238 million light-years from the Milky Way and about 97,000 light-years in diameter. It was discovered by Edward Emerson Barnard on October 2, 1893.

IC 1296 is only 4 arc minutes away from the well-known Ring Nebula in the night sky. Planetary nebulae and galaxies are rarely observed together because planetary nebulae are galactic objects and are concentrated toward our galactic center, where extragalactic objects – such as distant galaxies – are rarely observed there due to absorption by gas and dust.

== Supernova ==
One supernova has been observed in IC 1296: SN 2013ev (Type II, mag. 17.2) was discovered by the Italian Supernovae Search Project (ISSP) on 11 August 2013.

== See also ==
- List of spiral galaxies
