= NGC 3054 =

Galaxy in the constellation Hydra

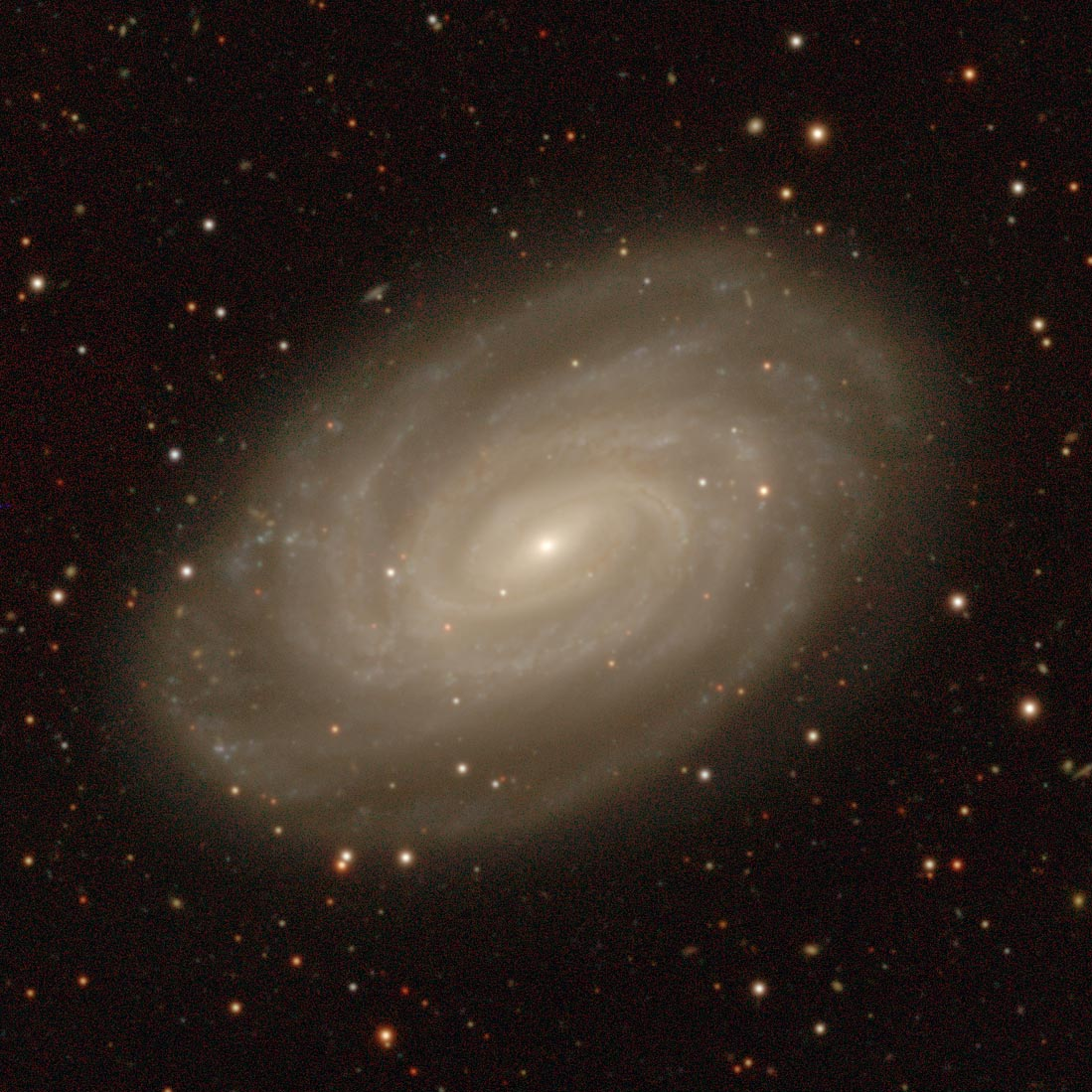
- NGC 3054 imaged by Legacy Surveys

Observation data (J2000 epoch)
- Constellation: Hydra
- Right ascension: 09^{h} 54^{m} 28.605^{s}
- Declination: −25° 42′ 12.37″
- Redshift: 0.008091±0.0000230
- Heliocentric radial velocity: 2,425 km/s
- Distance: 130 Mly (40 Mpc)
- Group or cluster: NGC 3054 group (LGG 185)
- Apparent magnitude (V): 12.6

Characteristics
- Type: SAB(r)bc
- Apparent size (V): 3′.8 × 2′.3

Other designations
- ESO 499- G 018, 2MASX J09542860-2542123, UGCA 187, MCG -04-24-005, PGC 28571

NGC 3054 is an intermediate spiral galaxy in the constellation Hydra. Its velocity with respect to the cosmic microwave background is 2,758±24 km/s, which corresponds to a Hubble distance of 132.7 ± 9.4 Mly (40.68 ± 2.87 Mpc). However, 21 non-redshift measurements give a closer mean distance of 96.98 ± 6.35 Mly (29.733 ± 1.946 Mpc). It was discovered by German–American astronomer Christian Peters on 3 April 1859.

== NGC 3054 group ==
NGC 3054 is the brightest galaxy in the NGC 3054 group (also known as LGG 185). The other galaxies in the group are NGC 3051, NGC 3078, NGC 3084, NGC 3089, IC 2531, IC 2537, ESO 499-26, and ESO 499-32.

== Supernovae ==
Three supernovae have been observed in NGC 3054:

- SN 2004de (type unknown, mag. 14.5) was discovered by Berto Monard on 15 July 2004.
- SN 2006T (Type IIb, mag. 17.4) was discovered by Berto Monard on 30 January 2006.
- SN 2022crv (Type Ib, mag. 18.0457) was discovered by the Distance Less Than 40 Mpc (DLT40) survey on 19 February 2022.

== See also ==
- NGC 1300
- List of NGC objects (3001–4000)
