= NGC 514 =

Spiral galaxy in the constellation Pisces

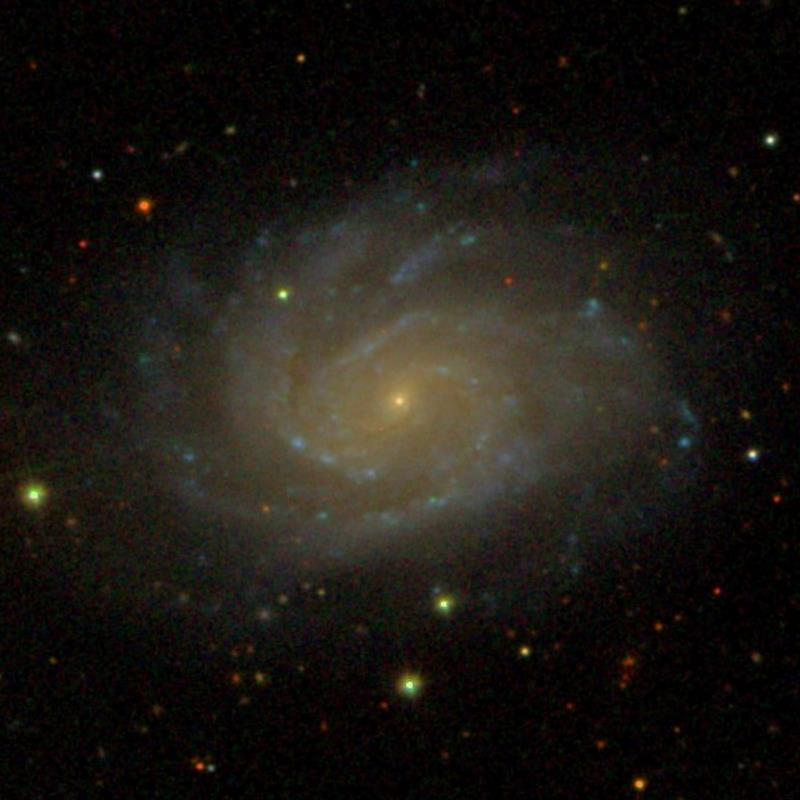
- SDSS image of NGC 514

Observation data (J2000 epoch)
- Constellation: Pisces
- Right ascension: 01^{h} 24^{m} 03.89603^{s}
- Declination: +12° 55′ 02.8476″
- Redshift: 0.008246±0.000010
- Heliocentric radial velocity: 2,472 km/s
- Distance: 82.8 Mly (25.4 Mpc)
- Apparent magnitude (V): 11.65

Characteristics
- Type: SAB(rs)c
- Apparent size (V): 3.5′ × 2.8′

Other designations
- UGC 947, PGC 5139

NGC 514 is a low-luminosity, intermediate spiral galaxy in the equatorial constellation of Pisces, located at a distance of approximately 83 million light-years from the Milky Way. It was discovered on 16 October 1784 by astronomer William Herschel. The general form of the galaxy is specified by its morphological classification of SAB(rs)c, which indicates it has a weak bar system at the core (SAB), an incomplete ring formation around the bar (rs), and somewhat loosely-wound spiral arms (c). This galaxy has an H II nucleus with an extended region that displays weak emission lines in the optical range, but not in the near infrared. The suspected supermassive black hole at the core has an estimated mass of 3.2×10^{6} M_{☉}.

== Supernova ==
One supernova has been observed in NGC 514. SN 2020uxz (Type Ia, mag. 16.5) was discovered by Kōichi Itagaki on 5 October 2020.

== See also ==
- List of NGC objects (1–1000)
