= NGC 765 =

Galaxy in the constellation Aries

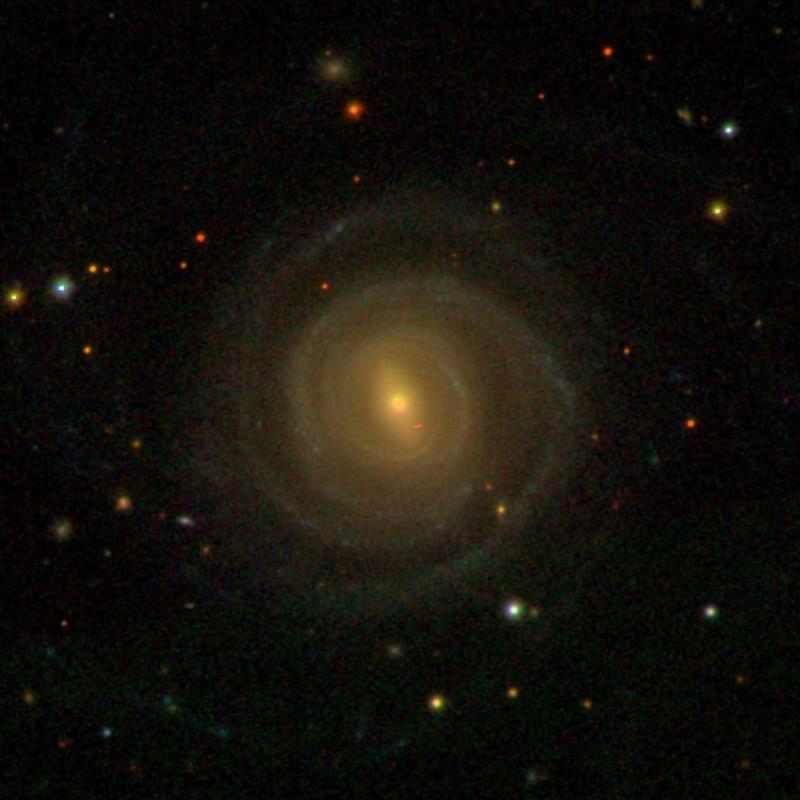
- NGC 765 by the SDSS

Observation data (J2000 epoch)
- Constellation: Aries
- Right ascension: 01^{h} 58^{m} 48.0^{s}
- Declination: +24° 53′ 33″
- Redshift: 0.017078 ± 0.000010
- Heliocentric radial velocity: 5,120 ± 3 km/s
- Distance: 222 Mly (68.1 Mpc)
- Apparent magnitude (V): 13.0

Characteristics
- Type: SAB(rs)bc
- Apparent size (V): 2.8′ × 2.8′
- Notable features: Extensive hydrogen disk

Other designations
- UGC 1455, CGCG 482-033, MCG +04-05-025, PGC 7475

NGC 765 is an intermediate spiral galaxy located in the constellation Aries. It is located at a distance of circa 220 million light years from Earth, which, given its apparent dimensions, means that NGC 765 is about 195,000 light years across. It was discovered by Albert Marth on October 8, 1864. The galaxy has an extensive hydrogen (HI) disk with low surface brightness, whose diameter is estimated to be 240 kpc (780,000 light years).

== Characteristics ==
The morphological classification of NGC 765 in the De Vaucouleurs system is SAB(rs)bc, where the 'SAB' denotes a weak-barred spiral, '(rs)' indicates a spiral structure which lies between that of a ring and a non-ring galaxy, and 'bc' means the spiral arms are intermediately wound. NGC 765 has at least three spiral arms, that can be traced up to a radius of 50 kpc. It has been identified to be a low surface brightness galaxy with a prominent bulge.

Emission by low ionisation elements, with strong [N II] and [S II] lines, as well as [O I], has been detected at the nuclear region of the galaxy indicating the presence of an active galactic nucleus. The nucleus also emits X-ray, which were detected by the Chandra X-ray Observatory. The X-ray flux in 0.2 - 10 KeV is estimated to be 1.1×10^{40} erg/s, which is comparable to some low luminosity active galactic nuclei, like LINERs. Diffuse X-ray emission from the galactic bulge has been attributed to the presence of gas.

NGC 765 holds a large amount of hydrogen gas [HI], which has been estimated to be 4.67×10^{10} M_{☉} based on the observed HI emission by the Very Large Array and the Westerbork Synthesis Radio Telescope wide-field survey. This mass is about an order of magnitude over the hydrogen mass observed in other low surface brightness galaxies, and also three times more than the mean mass of hydrogen in spiral galaxies. The HI mass-to-luminosity ratio for NGC 765 is MH I/LB~ 1.6. The mass of HI in the galaxy means it is categorised as a massive low surface brightness galaxy.

The HI is distributed on a large disk, which measures 240 kpc across. This is the largest observed disk in the nearby universe and it is a similar size to the disk of Malin 1. This disk appears asymmetric, with the east side showing a rapid decline in column density between 100 and 120 kpc, while the decline in the west side is smoother. Inside the disk are observed regions with higher brightness. They are compact, measuring less than 10kpc across and have a mass similar to that of dwarf irregular galaxies, and they hold about 10% of the galactic HI. It has been suggested that these clumps of HI are the remnants of accreted galaxies.

== Nearby galaxies ==
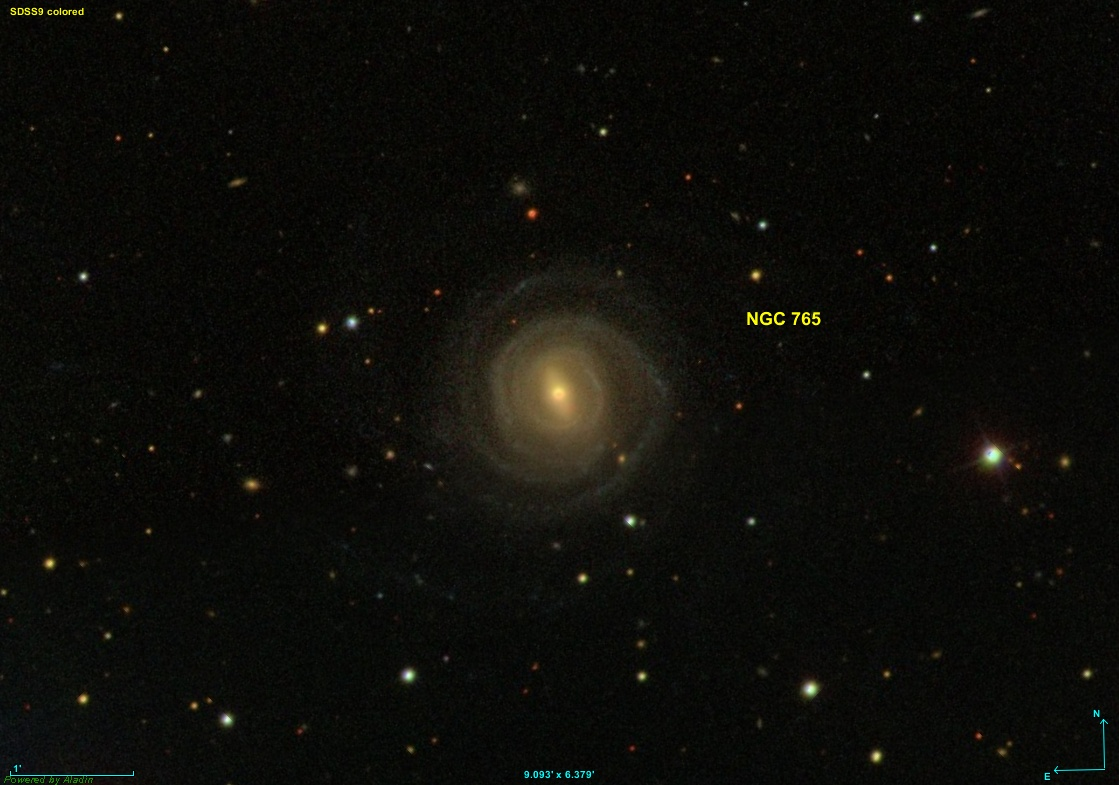
NGC 765 (from SDSS)

Two satellite galaxies have been detected; UGC 1453, an irregular galaxy which lies to the south, and NGC 765A, which was first detected in HI towards the north-east and has a faint visual counterpart. UGC 1453 is located 14.8 arcminutes from NGC 765, which corresponds to a projected distance of 310 kpc, and NGC 765A lies 16.5 arcminutes away, at a projected distance of 338 kpc.

NGC 765 is a member of the galaxy group known as LGG 41. Other members of the group include NGC 776, IC 187, IC 188, UGC 1451, and UGC 1479. The group is part of the Perseus–Pisces Supercluster.

== See also ==
- Malin 1 - prototype giant low surface galaxy
- NGC 262 - a galaxy with a similar giant hydrogen disk
