= NGC 5068 =

Galaxy in the constellation Virgo

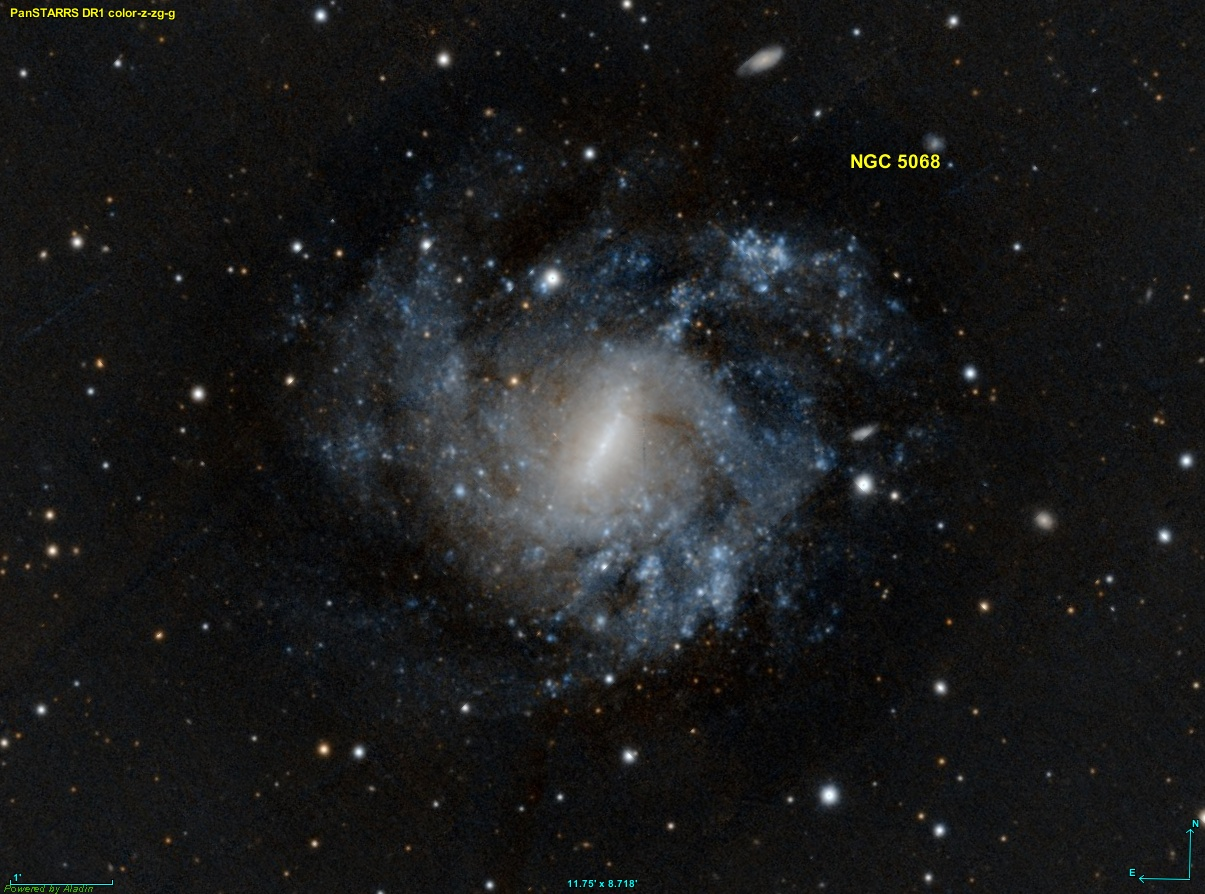
- Pan-STARRS image of NGC 5068

Observation data (J2000 epoch)
- Constellation: Virgo
- Right ascension: 13^{h} 18^{m} 54.7658^{s}
- Declination: −21° 02′ 19.705″
- Redshift: 0.002235
- Heliocentric radial velocity: 670 ± 1 km/s
- Distance: 22 Mly (6.8 Mpc)
- Apparent magnitude (V): 10.5

Characteristics
- Type: SB(s)d
- Size: ~68,200 ly (20.91 kpc) (estimated)
- Apparent size (V): 7.2′ × 6.3′

Other designations
- ESO 576- G 029, IRAS 13161-2046, UGCA 345, MCG -03-34-046, PGC 46400

NGC 5068 is a face-on field barred spiral galaxy in the constellation Virgo. NGC 5068 is located approximately 22 million light-years away and has a diameter that exceeds 45000 light-years. It was discovered by German-British astronomer William Herschel on 10 March 1785.

Although no supernovae have been observed in NGC 5068 yet, a luminous red nova, designated AT 2020hat (type LRN, mag. 17.8), was discovered by ATLAS on 12 April 2020.
