= NASA/IPAC Extragalactic Database =

Astronomical database

The NASA/IPAC Extragalactic Database (NED) is an online astronomical database for astronomers that collates and cross-correlates astronomical information on extragalactic objects (galaxies, quasars, radio, x-ray and infrared sources, etc.). NED was created in the late 1980s by two Pasadena astronomers, George Helou and Barry F. Madore. NED is funded by NASA and is operated by the Infrared Processing and Analysis Center (IPAC) on the campus of the California Institute of Technology, under contract with NASA.

NED is built around a master list of extragalactic objects for which cross-identifications of names have been established, accurate positions and redshifts entered to the extent possible, and some basic data collected. Bibliographic references relevant to individual objects have been compiled. Detailed and referenced photometry, position, and redshift data, have been taken from large compilations and from the literature.

NED also includes images from 2MASS, from the literature, and from the Digitized Sky Survey.

As of October 2025, NED contains 1.1 billion distinct astronomical objects with 1.5 billion cross-identifications across multiple wavelengths, with redshift measurements for 19 million objects, 14 billion photometric data points, 609 million diameter measurements, 250 thousand redshift-independent distances for over 150 thousand galaxies, 500 thousand detailed classifications for 230 thousand objects, and 2.6 million images, maps and external links, together with links to 140 thousand journal articles, notes and abstracts.

== See also ==
- SIMBAD - a database of information on Galactic objects, maintained by the Centre de Données astronomiques de Strasbourg, France
- NASA's Planetary Data System (PDS) - a database of information on solar system objects, also maintained by JPL
- NASA Astrophysics Data System (ADS)
- Bibcode
