= NGC 5090 and NGC 5091 =

Merging galaxies in the constellation Centaurus

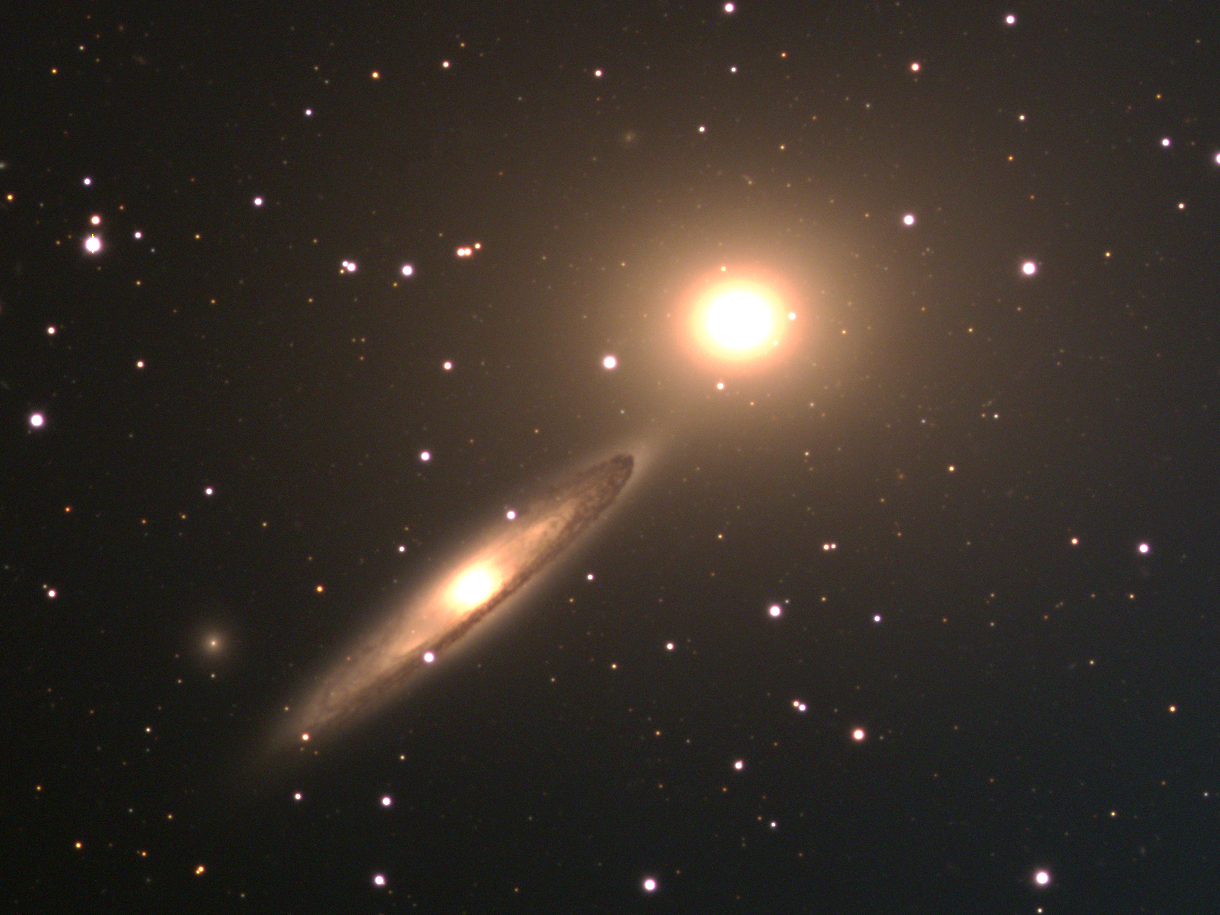
- NGC 5091 (left) and NGC 5090 (right)

Observation data (J2000 epoch)
- Constellation: Centaurus
- Right ascension: 5090: 13^{h} 21^{m} 12.8^{s} 5091: 13^{h} 21^{m} 17.7^{s}
- Declination: 5090: −43° 42′ 16.4″ 5091: −43° 43′ 10.8″
- Redshift: 5090: 0.01141±0.00007; 5091: 0.01177±0.00048
- Heliocentric radial velocity: 5090: 3,420.93±20.98; 5091: 3,528.86±145.10
- Distance: 5090: 50.37 ± 3.55 Mpc (164.3 ± 11.6 Mly); 5091: 51.85 ± 4.15 Mpc (169.1 ± 13.5 Mly)
- Apparent magnitude (V): 5090: 11.51; 5091: 13.35
- Apparent magnitude (B): 5090: 12.59; 5091: 13.94
- Absolute magnitude (V): 5090: −24.8; 5091: −21.0

Characteristics
- Type: 5090: E2; 5091: Sb pec sp
- Apparent size (V): 5090: 2′.9 × 2′.4; 5091: 1′.8 × 0′.5
- Notable features: Interacting galaxies

Other designations
- PGC 46618 / 46626, ESO 270-2 / 270-4, LEDA 46618 / 46626, 2MASX J13211286-4342168 / J13211859-4343244

NGC 5090 and NGC 5091 are a set of galaxies approximately 160 million light-years (50 million parsecs) away in the constellation Centaurus. They are in the process of colliding and merging with some evidence of tidal disruption of NGC 5091.

NGC 5090 is an elliptical galaxy while NGC 5091 is a barred spiral galaxy. The radial velocity of the nucleus of NGC 5090 has been measured at 3,185 km/s (1,979 mi/s), while NGC 5091 has a radial velocity of 3,429 km/s (2,131 mi/s). NGC 5090 is associated with the strong, double radio source PKS 1318-43.

== Supernovae ==
Three supernovae have been observed in NGC 5090:

- SN 1981C (type unknown, mag. 14.5) was discovered by Chilean astronomer José Maza Sancho on 2 March 1981.
- SN 2025cy (Type Ia, mag. 18.03) was discovered by BlackGEM on 1 January 2025.
- SN 2026bgd (Type Ia, mag. 18.208) was discovered by ATLAS on 24 January 2026.

== See also ==
- ESO 269-57
- NGC 2207 and IC 2163
- NGC 6872 and IC 4970
- List of NGC objects (5001–6000)
