= UGC 2885 =

Galaxy in the constellation Perseus

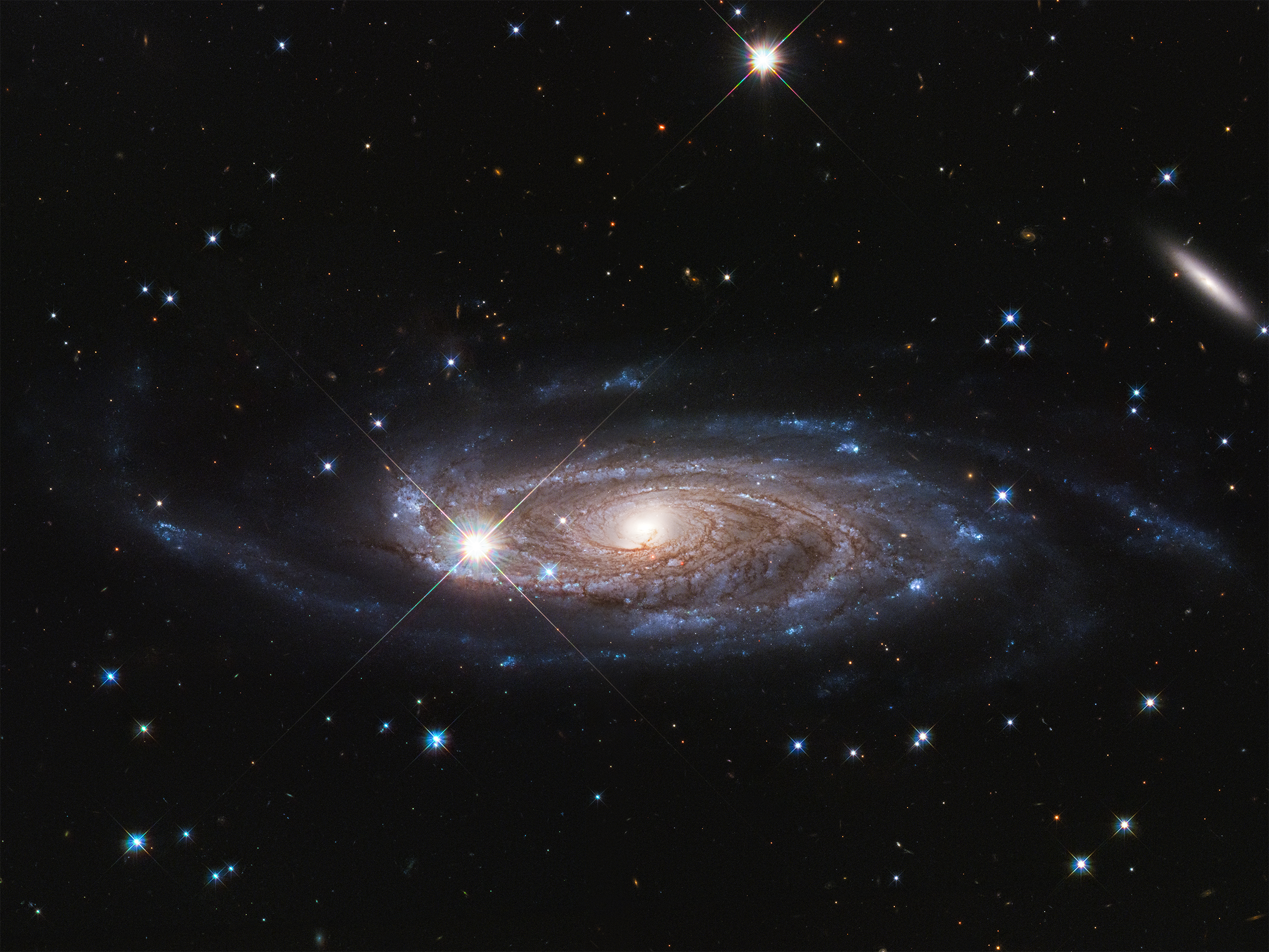
- UGC 2885 imaged by the Hubble Space Telescope

Observation data (J2000 epoch)
- Constellation: Perseus
- Right ascension: 03^{h} 53^{m} 02.459^{s}
- Declination: +35° 35′ 22.17″
- Redshift: 0.019350±0.000010
- Heliocentric radial velocity: 5,801±3 km/s
- Galactocentric velocity: 5,870±4 km/s
- Distance: 274.0 ± 19.24 Mly (84.0 ± 5.9 Mpc)h^{−1}_{0.6774} (Comoving); 269 Mly (82.48 Mpc)h^{−1}_{0.6774} (Light-travel)
- Apparent magnitude (V): 13.5
- Apparent magnitude (B): 14.4

Characteristics
- Type: SA(rs)c
- Mass: 2 trillion M_{☉}
- Size: 438,060 ly × 201,500 ly (134.31 kpc × 61.78 kpc) (diameter; 25.0 B-mag arcsec^{−2}) (Note: The quick-look major axis physical diameters given by NED of 113.75 by 52.33 kiloparsecs (371,000 by 171,000 light-years) and 56.12 by 23.57 kiloparsecs (183,000 by 76,900 light-years) were based on a distance estimate of 71.1 megaparsecs (231.9 million light-years). The quoted diameters in this infobox were based on NED's provided scale "Virgo + GA + Shapley" of 407 parsecs/arcsec multiplied with given angular diameters.); 216,110 ly × 90,769 ly (66.26 kpc × 27.83 kpc) (diameter; 20.0 K-mag arcsec^{−2})
- Apparent size (V): 5.5′ × 2.5′

Other designations
- TC 49, Z 039.8+3527, IRAS 03497+3526, MCG +06-09-012, PGC 14030, CGCG 526-012

UGC 2885, Rubin's Galaxy, or the Godzilla galaxy is a giant barred spiral galaxy of type SA(rs)c in the constellation Perseus. It is 84 megaparsecs (274.0 million light-years) from Earth and measures 134.3 kiloparsecs (438,000 light-years) across, making it one of the largest known spiral galaxies. It is also a possible member of the Perseus–Pisces Supercluster.

UGC 2885 is a spiral galaxy with a relatively low surface brightness, but does not have as low of a surface brightness as other so-called giant low surface brightness galaxies.

UGC 2885 is classified as a field galaxy, being remarkably isolated from other galaxies. It is unknown how it got its cold gas which is necessary for star formation. NASA has reported that the theorized main source for disk growth for UGC 2885 came from the accretion of intergalactic hydrogen gas, rather than through the repeated process of galactic collision, as most galaxies are thought to grow.

The lack of interaction is evident from the near-perfect structure of the spiral arms and disk, lack of tidal tails, and modest rate of star formation—approximately 0.5 solar masses/year.

Additionally, despite being originally classified as an unbarred spiral galaxy, new Hubble images clearly show the presence of a small bar cutting across the ring structure of the core. This is peculiar, as most bars are thought to form through minor gravitational perturbations brought on by satellite and neighboring galaxies, which is something this galaxy lacks. This galaxy highlights that bars are able to form in spiral galaxies without the influence of another galaxy—this indicates that other forces, such as interactions between stars, gas and dust, as well as the gravitational influence of dark matter, might play a role in their development.

== Supernovae ==
Two supernovae have been observed in UGC 2885:

- SN 2002F (Type II, mag. 18.1) was discovered by LOTOSS (Lick Observatory and Tenagra Observatory Supernova Searches) using the Katzman Automatic Imaging Telescope on 17 January 2002.
- SN 2025aant (Type II, mag. 18.424) was discovered by ATLAS on 15 October 2025.

== See also ==
- Condor Galaxy (NGC 6872) and IC 4970, largest known spiral galaxy and its neighbor
- Malin 1, giant low surface brightness spiral galaxy
- NGC 262, spiral galaxy with giant hydrogen cloud
- ESO 383-76, one of largest galaxies overall
- IC 1101, giant lenticular galaxy
