= IC 2082 =

Galaxy in the constellation of Dorado

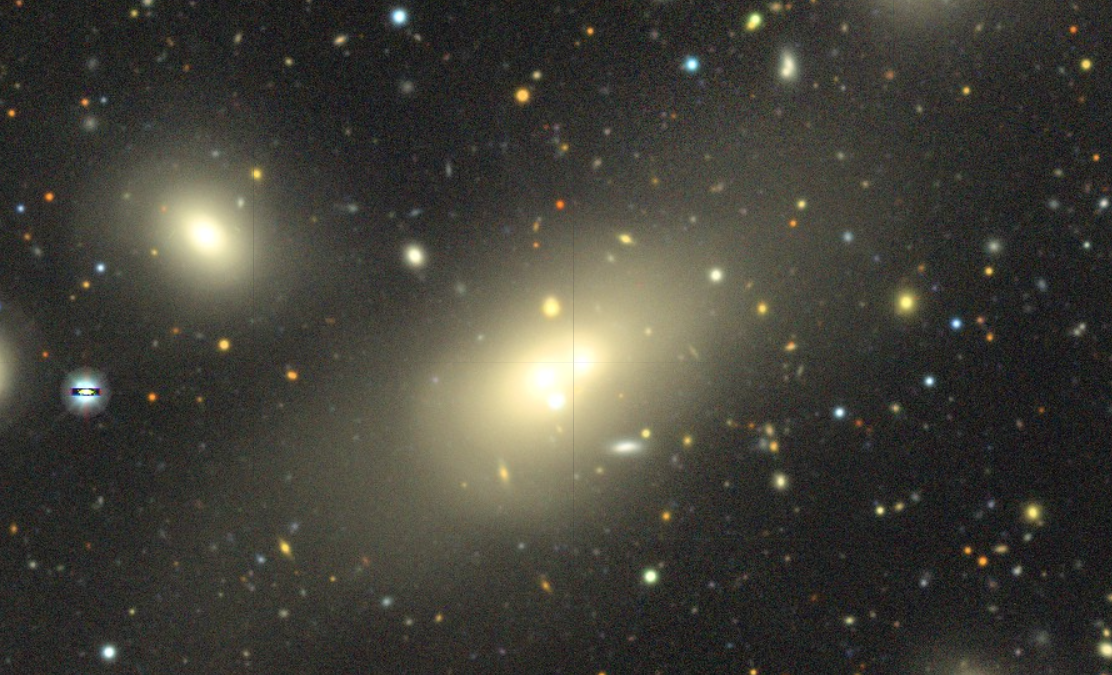
- DESI Legacy Surveys image of IC 2082

Observation data (J2000 epoch)
- Constellation: Dorado
- Right ascension: 04^{h} 29^{m} 08.240^{s}
- Declination: −53° 49′ 40.200″
- Redshift: 0.039311
- Heliocentric radial velocity: 11,785 km/s
- Distance: 567 Mly (174 Mpc)
- Apparent magnitude (V): 13.2

Characteristics
- Type: S0 pec WLRG
- Size: ~247,600 ly (75.91 kpc) (estimated)

Other designations
- IC 2082, ESO 157-IG035, PKS 0427-53, PMN J0429-5349, RR 089, PGC 15239, PAPER J067.27-53.76

IC 2082 is a large peculiar lenticular galaxy located towards the constellation of Dorado. The galaxy lies about 560 million-light years away from Earth and it was first discovered by DeLisle Stewart on December 7, 1899, who described it as either a galaxy pair or a binuclear galaxy.

== Description ==
IC 2082 makes up a part of a dumbbell system. It is described as having two nuclei with a separation gap of 33 kiloparsecs and is enveloped by an extended halo. There are tidal distortions to both the galaxy and its companion in the system described as having an irregular appearance, suggesting a strong interaction with each other by the forces. The spectrum of the galaxy is found to display weak emission lines.

The nucleus of the galaxy has been classified as active and it has been referred to as a Fanaroff-Riley class Type-I radio galaxy with a powerful source associated with the fainter south-eastern component of the system. Based on radio imaging, the source is categorized as having a wide-angle tail radio morphology. The western tail is long, travelling up to more than 8 arcmin from the nucleus while the eastern tail is however shorter in terms of projection, displaying a swing degree north by 1.6 arcmin before sharply bending east. The head of the source is separated into two resolved components.

A long trail of radio emission is seen extending westwards from the galaxy's western radio lobe with further imaging showing both the inner lobes and its radio core. Observations showed the component on the western side is heavily polarized by 14% at position angle of 165°.

IC 2082 is the brightest member residing in the center of DC 0428-53, a Bautz-Morgan type I-II galaxy cluster. Known as Abell S463, the cluster is home to at least 200 galaxies of which 30 of them have measured velocity measurements and is made up of three subgroups.
