= IC 4633 =

Spiral galaxy in the constellation of Apus

- IC 4633 seen by Hubble Space Telescope

Observation data (J2000 epoch)
- Constellation: Apus
- Right ascension: 17^{h} 13^{m} 47.0485^{s}
- Declination: −77° 32′ 10.099″
- Redshift: 0.009800
- Heliocentric radial velocity: 2953.2 km/s
- Galactocentric velocity: 2794 ± 3 km/s
- Distance: 114.876 ± 6.119 Mly (35.221 ± 1.876 Mpc)
- Apparent magnitude (B): 12.4
- Absolute magnitude (B): -20.44 ± 0.566
- Surface brightness: 23.98 mag/arcsec²
- Magnitude (J): 9.350
- Magnitude (H): 8.704
- Magnitude (K): 8.465

Characteristics
- Type: SA(r)cd
- Size: 56.35 kiloparsec

Other designations
- IC 4633, ESO 044- G 003, ESO 170619-7728.5, FAIRALL 0841, UKS 1706-774, PGC 59884, AM 1705-773

IC 4633 is a spiral galaxy located in the constellation of Apus. It was discovered by DeLisle Stewart on August 17, 1900. Dreyer noted it as very faint, considerably large, considerably brighter middle, possibly spiral. IC 4633 is part of the 2MASS Extended Source Catalog.

IC 4633 is partly hidden behind a dark cloud within the Milky Way. The dark cloud overlapping IC 4633 is known as MW9 or the South Celestial Serpent. The low surface brightness observed from IC 4633 is most likely caused by foreground cirrus, diffuse dust structures within the Milky Way.

== Properties ==
IC 4633 is considered to host an active galactic nucleus. It is classified as an emission-line galaxy and low surface brightness (LSB) galaxy. IC 4633 is one of the 20 largest neutral hydrogen (H I) mass galaxies and has a maximum rotational width (W_{mx}) of 318 ± 13 km s^{-1} and an H I gas mass (M_{HI}/M_{☉}) of 2.57 × 10^{10}. IC 4633 has a corrected total mass (X_{TM, cor}/M_{☉}) of 7.76 × 10^{10} M_{☉}, H I mass-to-light ratio of 0.63 (M_{☉}/L_{☉}), a total mass-to-light ratio of 4.75 (M_{☉}/L_{☉}) and a gas-to-total mass fraction of 0.13.

IC 4633 has a stellar mass (M*/M_{☉}) of 10.68 ± 0.10, a logarithmic star formation rate of 0.32 ± 0.20 M_{☉} yr^{-1} and has an offset from the star forming main sequence of -0.02. IC 4633 has an E(B−V) of 0.1945 and a blue luminosity of 3.566 × 10¹⁰ L_{☉}.

== Environment ==
Based on work by Ehsan Kourkchi and R. Brent Tully, IC 4633 is part of a galaxy group known as Group 59884 that consists of 5 galaxies. The group has a line-of-sight velocity dispersion of 172 km/s and a log of group mass from luminosity of 12.905 M_{☉}.
