= NGC 458 =

Open cluster located in the constellation Tucana

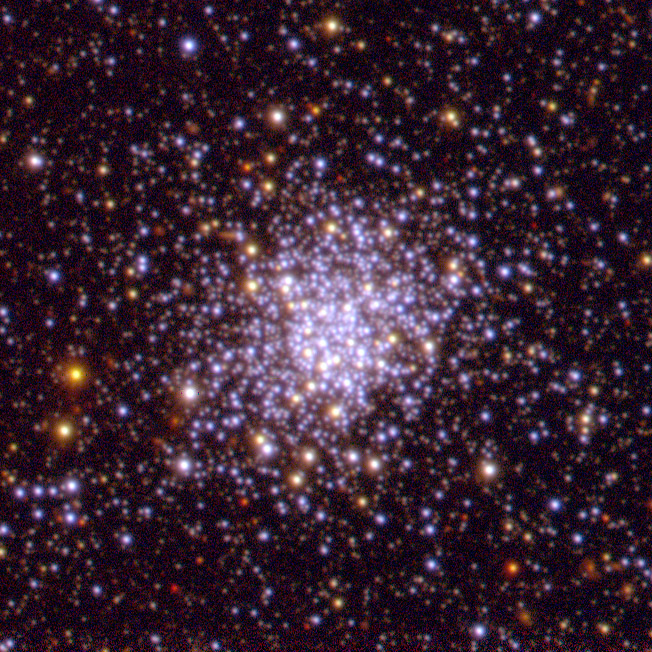
- NGC 458 as seen by DECam

Observation data (J2000 epoch)
- Right ascension: 01^{h} 14^{m} 53.36^{s}
- Declination: −71° 32′ 58.7″
- Apparent magnitude (V): 11.73
- Apparent dimensions (V): 2.6′ × 2.3′

Physical characteristics
- Mass: 2.6×10^{4} M_{☉}
- Estimated age: 0.14±0.03 Gyr
- Other designations: Kron 69, Lindsay 96, ESO 51-26, RZ2005 197.

Associations
- Constellation: Tucana

NGC 458 is an open cluster located in the constellation Tucana. It was discovered on September 6, 1826, by James Dunlop. It was also observed by John Herschel and DeLisle Stewart. It was described by Dreyer as "pretty faint, large, round, very gradually brighter middle". It was also noted in the second Index Catalogue that it was "probably a cluster, extremely small, close, no nebulosity seen by D.S. (DeLisle Stewart)." At an aperture of 31 arcseconds, its apparent V-band magnitude is 11.73, but at this wavelength, it has 0.12 magnitudes of interstellar extinction.

NGC 458 is quite young, at about 140 million years old. Its estimated mass is 2.6×10^{4} M_{☉}, and its total luminosity is 1.24×10^{5} L_{☉}, leading to a mass-to-luminosity ratio of 0.21 M_{☉}/L_{☉}. However, the dynamical mass may be inaccurate due to the small stellar sample used in the analysis. All else equal, older star clusters have higher mass-to-luminosity ratios; that is, they have lower luminosities for the same mass.

== See also ==
- List of NGC objects (1–1000)
