= NGC 422 =

Open cluster located in the constellation Tucana

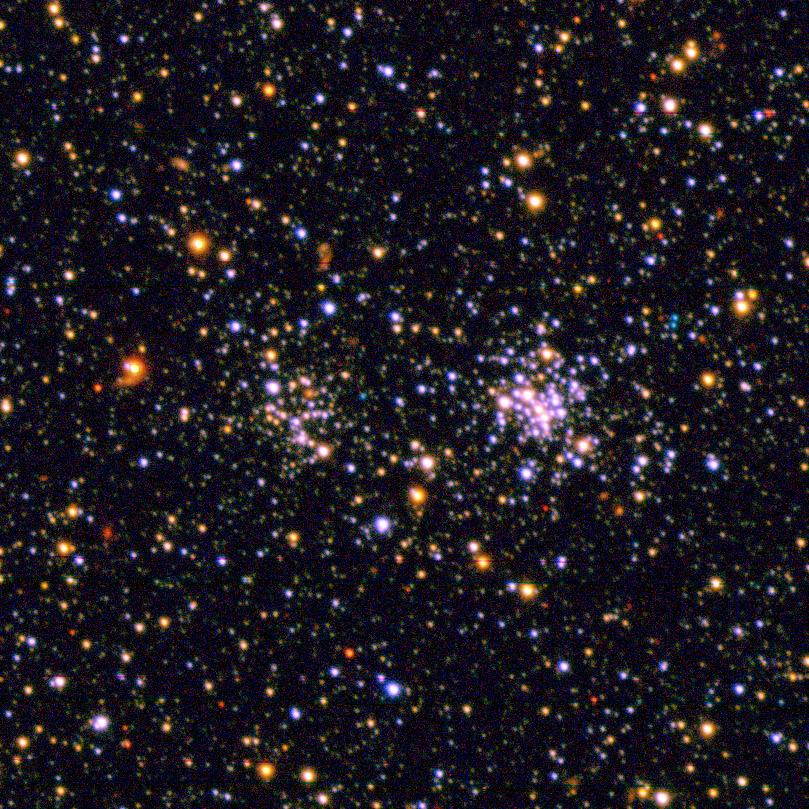
- IC 1641 (left) and NGC 422 (right) as seen by DECam; Credit: DSS

Observation data (J2000 epoch)
- Right ascension: 01^{h} 09^{m} 24.50^{s}
- Declination: −71° 45′ 59.0″
- Apparent magnitude (V): 13.26
- Apparent dimensions (V): 1.0′ × 1.0′

Physical characteristics
- Other designations: Kron 62, Lindsay 87, ESO 51-22, RZ2005 178.

Associations
- Constellation: Tucana

NGC 422 is an open cluster located in the constellation Tucana. It was discovered on September 21, 1835, by John Herschel. It was described by John Louis Emil Dreyer as "very faint (in Nubecular Minor)", with Nubecular Minor being the Small Magellanic Cloud. It was also described by DeLisle Stewart as "only 3 extremely faint stars, close together, not a nebula."
