= NGC 262 =

Galaxy in constellation Andromeda

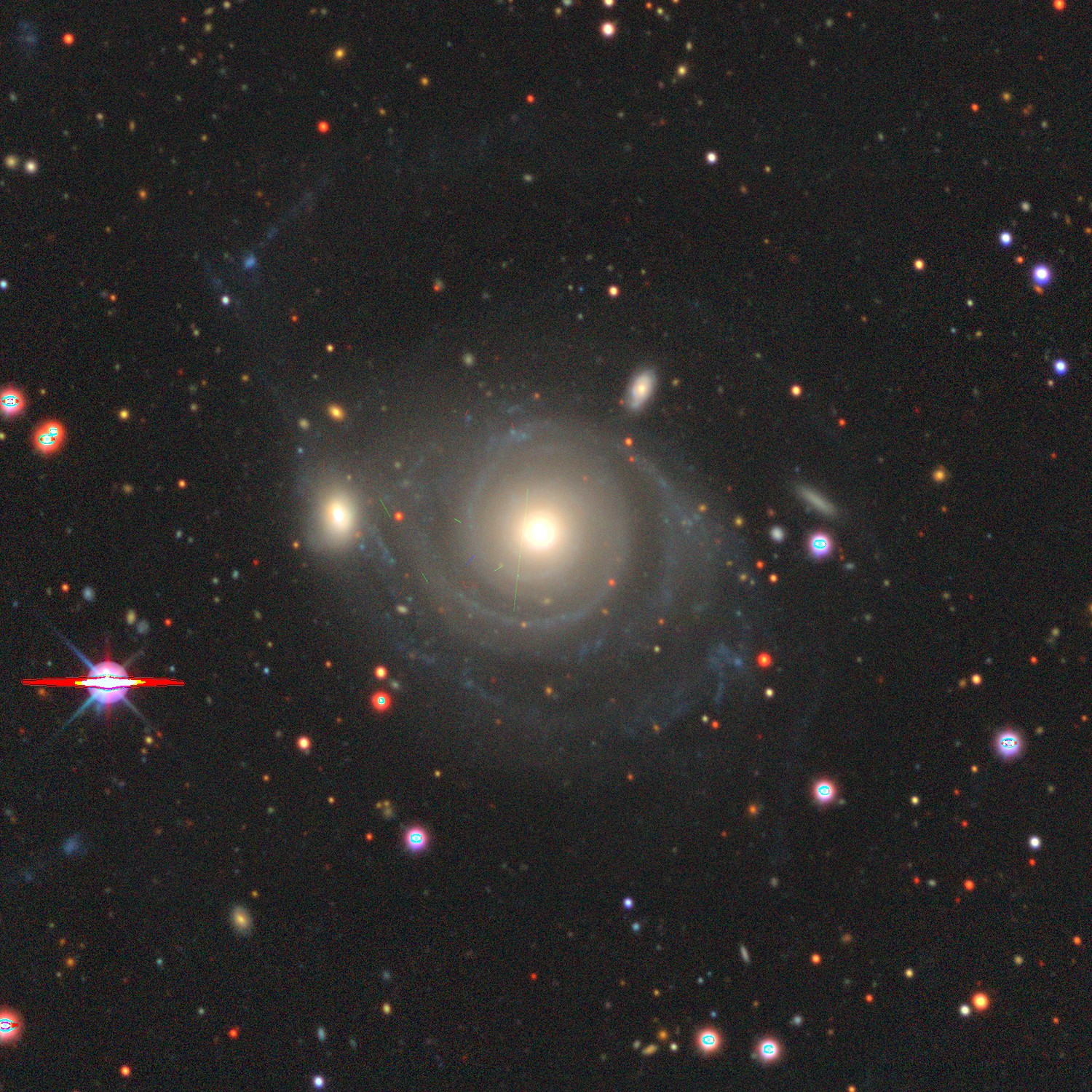
- NGC 262 imaged by Legacy Surveys.

Observation data (J2000 epoch)
- Constellation: Andromeda
- Right ascension: 00^{h} 48^{m} 47.141479^{s}
- Declination: +31° 57′ 25.0845702″
- Redshift: 0.01466916±0.0005
- Heliocentric radial velocity: 4,365±150 km/s
- Galactocentric velocity: 4,397.7±150 km/s
- Distance: 213.3 ± 15.00 Mly (65.4 ± 4.6 Mpc)h^{−1}_{0.6774} (Comoving); 200 Mly (61.32 Mpc)h^{−1}_{0.6774} (Light-travel)
- Group or cluster: NGC 315 Group
- Apparent magnitude (V): 13.06±0.19
- Apparent magnitude (B): 13.90±0.19
- magnitude (J): 11.240±0.033
- magnitude (H): 10.554±0.044
- magnitude (K): 10.097±0.047

Characteristics
- Type: SA0/a?(s): Sy2
- Size: 99,249 ly × 93,313 ly (30.43 kpc × 28.61 kpc) (diameter; 25.0 B-mag arcsec^{−2}) (Note: The quick-look major axis physical diameters given by NED of 10.01 by 9.41 kiloparsecs (32,600 by 30,700 light-years) and 10.19 by 7.95 kiloparsecs (33,200 by 25,900 light-years) were based on a distance estimate of 21.5 megaparsecs (70.12 million light-years). The quoted diameters in this infobox were based on NED's provided scale "Virgo + GA + Shapley" of 317 parsecs/arcsec multiplied with given angular diameters.); 101,110 ly × 78,865 ly (31.00 kpc × 24.18 kpc) (diameter; "total" magnitude)
- Apparent size (V): 2.1′ × 1.9′
- H I scale length (physical): 400 kpc (1,300,000 ly)
- Notable features: Surrounded by a large H I disk

Other designations
- IRAS 00461+3141, 2MASX J00484711+3157249, UGC 499, MCG +05-03-008, Mrk 348, PGC 2855, CGCG 501-020

NGC 262 (also known as Markarian 348) is a Seyfert 2 spiral galaxy located 65.4 megaparsecs (213 million light-years) away in the constellation Andromeda. It was discovered on 17 September 1885 by Lewis A. Swift.

NGC 262 was tidally disturbed by the gravitational forces of smaller galaxies, which resulted in a surrounding large cloud over 10 times larger than the Milky Way. It is also a member of the NGC 315 Group (also known as LGG 14), which contains 42 galaxies, including NGC 226, NGC 243, NGC 266, NGC 311, NGC 315, NGC 338, IC 43, IC 66, and IC 69, among others.

== Properties ==
NGC 262 is very unusual when compared to a regular spiral galaxy of its type. Similar to Malin 1, it is surrounded by a very huge cloud of neutral hydrogen extending roughly 400 kiloparsecs (1,300,000 light-years) across, which is probably caused by the tidal stripping of smaller galaxies. As such, it has been thus described as the largest known spiral galaxy. However, the isophotal diameters of NGC 262 are much smaller with only up to 31 kiloparsecs (101,000 light-years), leaving larger isophotal diameters measured for many other spiral galaxies such as Andromeda Galaxy, Pinwheel Galaxy, UGC 2885, and NGC 6872.

The cloud has an apparent mass of approximately 50 billion solar masses (M_{☉}) at a distance of 88 kiloparsecs (287,000 light-years) from the nucleus of NGC 262. The cloud is spiral-shaped with at least one arm, and possibly another one extending throughout the galaxy. The galaxy holds approximately 15 trillion stars.

== See also ==
- List of NGC objects (1–1000)
