= ESO 269-57 =

Large spiral galaxy in the constellation Centaurus

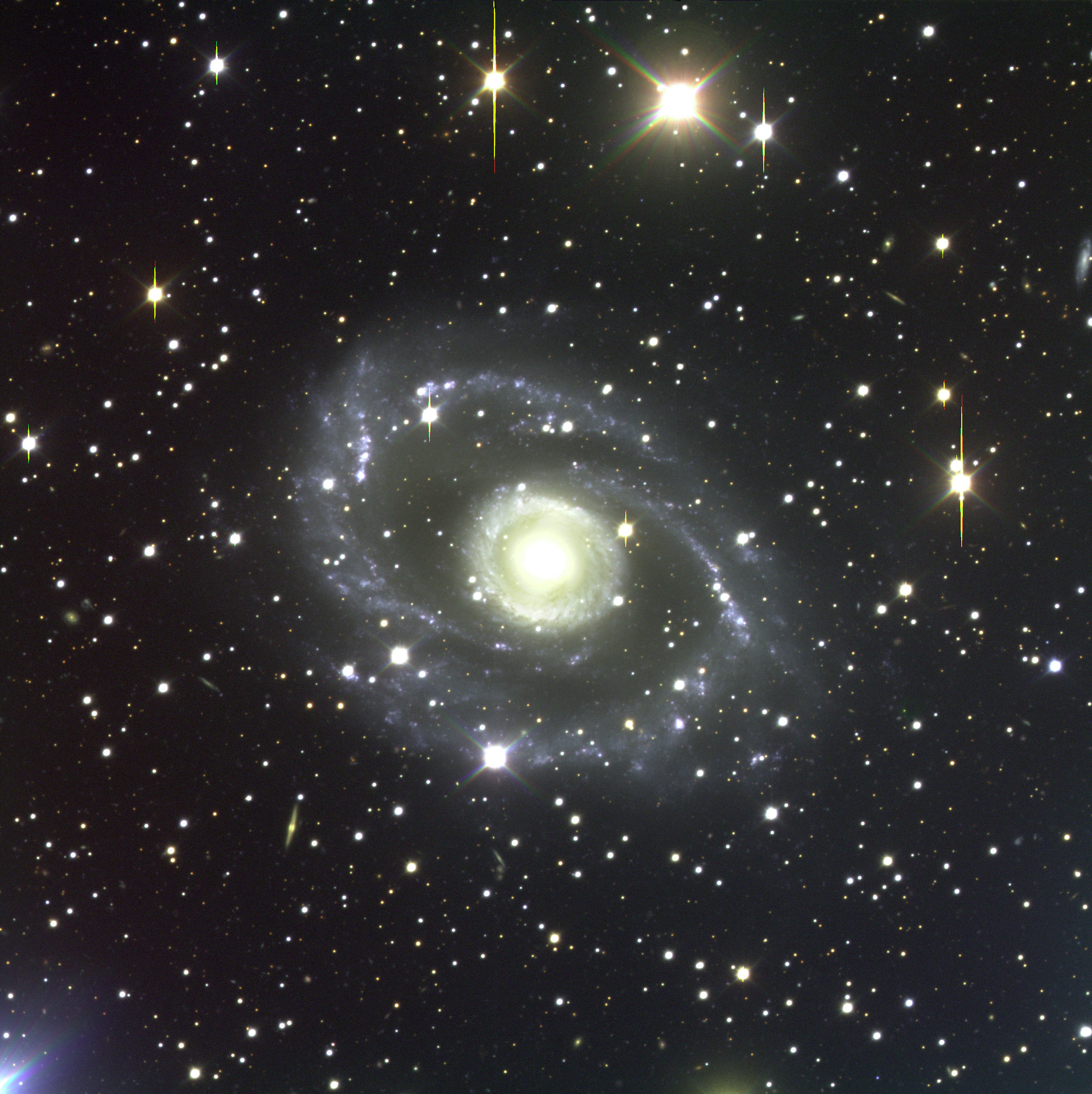
- ESO 269-57 imaged by the ESO's Very Large Telescope

Observation data (J2000 epoch)
- Constellation: Centaurus
- Right ascension: 13^{h} 10^{m} 04.4^{s}
- Declination: −46° 26′ 14″
- Redshift: 0.010360
- Heliocentric radial velocity: 3106 km/s
- Distance: 150 Mly (45.9 Mpc)
- Group or cluster: NGC 5064 Group
- Apparent magnitude (V): 12.49

Characteristics
- Type: (R')SAB(r)ab
- Size: ~216,200 ly (66.29 kpc) (estimated)
- Apparent size (V): 3.2 x 2.3

Other designations
- PGC 45683

ESO 269-57 is a large barred spiral galaxy located about 150 million light-years away in the constellation Centaurus. ESO 269-57 has a diameter of about 200,000 light-years. It is part of group of galaxies known as LGG 342. which is also known as the NGC 5064 Group which is part of the Centaurus Supercluster.

== Physical characteristics ==
ESO 269-57 has an inner ring surrounding its bright center and connected by its bar. The ring is made up of several tightly wound spiral arms. Surrounding the inner ring, are two outer arms made up of star-forming regions that appear to split into several branches of arms.

== Supernova ==
One supernova has been observed in ESO 269-57.

- SN 1992K (Type Ia, mag. 16.23) was discovered by Roberto Antezana on March 3, 1992. This supernova was found to be similar to SN 1991bg in its red color and low luminosity.

== See also ==
- List of spiral galaxies
- NGC 1291
