= IC 66 =

Galaxy in Cetus constellation

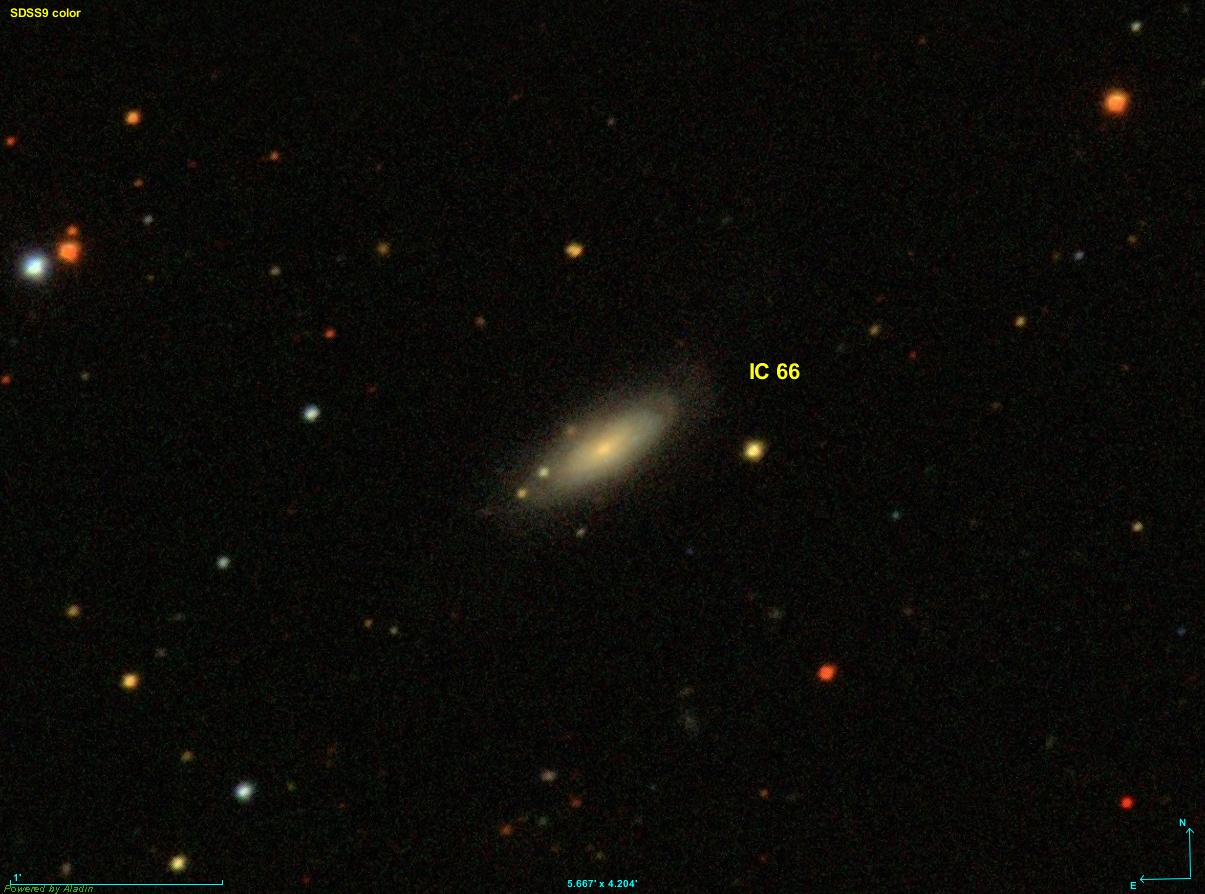
- Image of IC 66

Observation data (J2000 epoch)
- Constellation: Cetus
- Right ascension: 01^{h} 00^{m} 32.4618^{s}
- Declination: +30° 47′ 50.224″
- Redshift: 0.016111 ± 0.0000005
- Heliocentric radial velocity: 4830 ± 1 km/s
- Galactocentric velocity: 4983 ± 6 km/s
- Distance: 217.7 ± 15.3 Mly (66.75 ± 4.68 Mpc)
- Apparent magnitude (V): 14.21

Characteristics
- Type: Sa
- Size: ~253,100 ly (77.60 kpc) (estimated)

Other designations
- 2MASX J01003251+3047500, UGC 623, LEDA 3606, PGC 3606

IC 66 (also known as UGC 623) is a spiral galaxy in the constellation Cetus. It was discovered November 12, 1890 by Guillaume Bigourdan.

IC 66 is considered to part of a galaxy group known as NGC 315 or LGG 14. It has at least 10 confirmed members which are NGC 226, NGC 243, NGC 262, NGC 266, NGC 311, NGC 338, IC 43, NGC 315, AND IC 69.

== See also ==
- List of galaxies
