= 475 Ocllo =

Mars-crossing asteroid

Discovery
- Discovered by: D. Stewart
- Discovery date: 14 August 1901

Designations
- Pronunciation: /ˈɒkloʊ/
- Named after: Mama Uqllu, legendary first queen of the Kingdom of Cuzco
- Alternative designations: 1901 HN; 1959 JS; 1979 DD
- Minor planet category: Mars-crosser

Orbital characteristics
- Epoch 31 July 2016 (JD 2457600.5)
- Uncertainty parameter 0
- Observation arc: 97.47 yr (35601 d)
- Aphelion: 3.5821 AU (535.87 Gm)
- Perihelion: 1.60661 AU (240.345 Gm)
- Semi-major axis: 2.59436 AU (388.111 Gm)
- Eccentricity: 0.38073
- Orbital period (sidereal): 4.18 yr (1526.3 d)
- Mean anomaly: 174.037°
- Mean motion: 0° 14^{m} 9.096^{s} / day
- Inclination: 18.926°
- Longitude of ascending node: 34.496°
- Argument of perihelion: 305.68°
- Earth MOID: 0.670978 AU (100.3769 Gm)
- Mars MOID: 0.3173 AU (47.47 Gm)

Physical characteristics
- Dimensions: 11–25 km
- Mass: 3.1×10^{16}? kg
- Mean density: 2.0? g/cm^{3}
- Synodic rotation period: 7.3151 h (0.30480 d)
- Spectral type: X
- Absolute magnitude (H): 11.88

475 Ocllo is a large Mars-crossing asteroid. It was discovered by American astronomer DeLisle Stewart on August 14, 1901, and was assigned a provisional name of 1901 HN.

Photometric observations of this asteroid at the Organ Mesa Observatory in Las Cruces, New Mexico during 2010 gave a light curve with a period of 7.3151 ± 0.0002 hours and a brightness variation of 0.66 ± 0.04 in magnitude.
