= NGC 266 =

Galaxy in the constellation Pisces

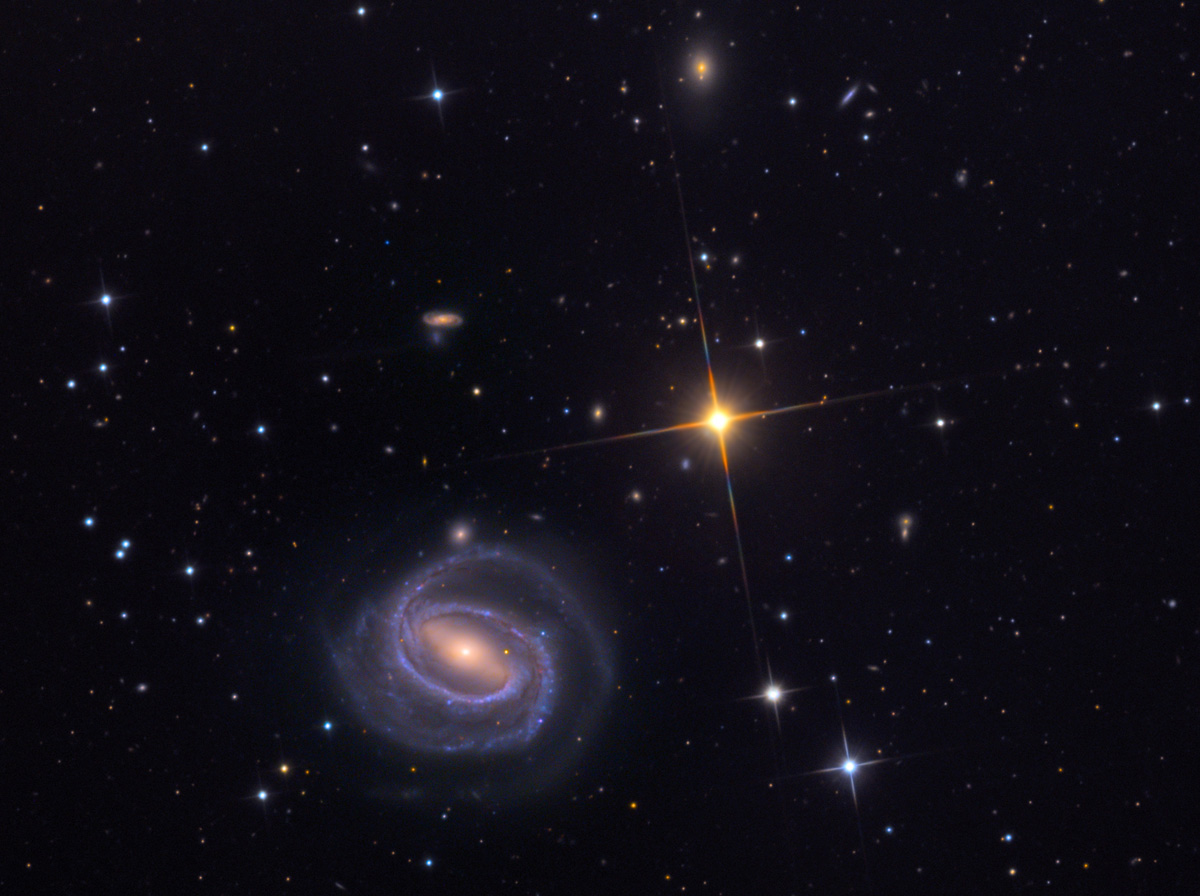
- NGC 266 is the galaxy in the center-left of this photo. The bright star in the center is SAO 54174.

Observation data (J2000 epoch)
- Constellation: Pisces
- Right ascension: 00^{h} 49^{m} 47.81400^{s}
- Declination: +32° 16′ 39.8067″
- Redshift: 0.015547
- Heliocentric radial velocity: 4,565.3±15.3 km/s
- Distance: 197 Mly (60.3 Mpc)
- Group or cluster: NGC 315 Group
- Apparent magnitude (V): 12.54

Characteristics
- Type: SB(rs)ab
- Size: 223,150 ly (68.45 kpc) (estimated)
- Apparent size (V): 3.0' × 2.9'

Other designations
- IRAS 00471+3200, 2MASX J00494779+3216398, UGC 508, MCG +05-03-009, PGC 2901, CGCG 501-022

NGC 266 is a massive barred spiral galaxy in the constellation Pisces. NGC 266 is located at a distance of 197 megalight-years from the Milky Way. It was discovered on September 12, 1784, by William Herschel. The form of this barred galaxy is described by its morphological classification of SB(rs)ab, which indicates a quasi-ring-like structure (rs) and moderate-to-tightly wound spiral arms (ab).

NGC 266 is an LINER-type active galaxy. It has a moderate star formation rate estimated at 2.4 M_{☉}·yr^{−1}. A diffuse X-ray emission from hot gas has been detected around this galaxy, extending out to a radius of at least 70,000 light years. This emission not being driven by winds from a starburst region, so the root cause is unknown.

== NGC 315 group ==
According to A.M. Garcia, NGC 266 is a member of the NGC 315 Group (also known as LGG 14). This group contains 42 galaxies, including NGC 226, NGC 243, NGC 262, NGC 311, NGC 315, NGC 338, IC 43, IC 66, AND IC 69, among others. Also, a 2013 paper lists NGC 266 as the dominant member of a small group with six low-mass galaxies.

== Supernova ==
One supernova has been observed in NGC 266. On 5 October 2005, Tim Puckett, Peter Ceravolo, and Yasuo Sano discovered SN 2005gl (Type IIn, mag. 18.2). It was positioned 29.8″ east and 16.7″ north of the galactic nucleus. An image of the galaxy taken on September 10 showed no supernova event, so this explosion occurred after that date. The progenitor was identified as a massive hypergiant star that was most likely a luminous blue variable.

== Image gallery ==
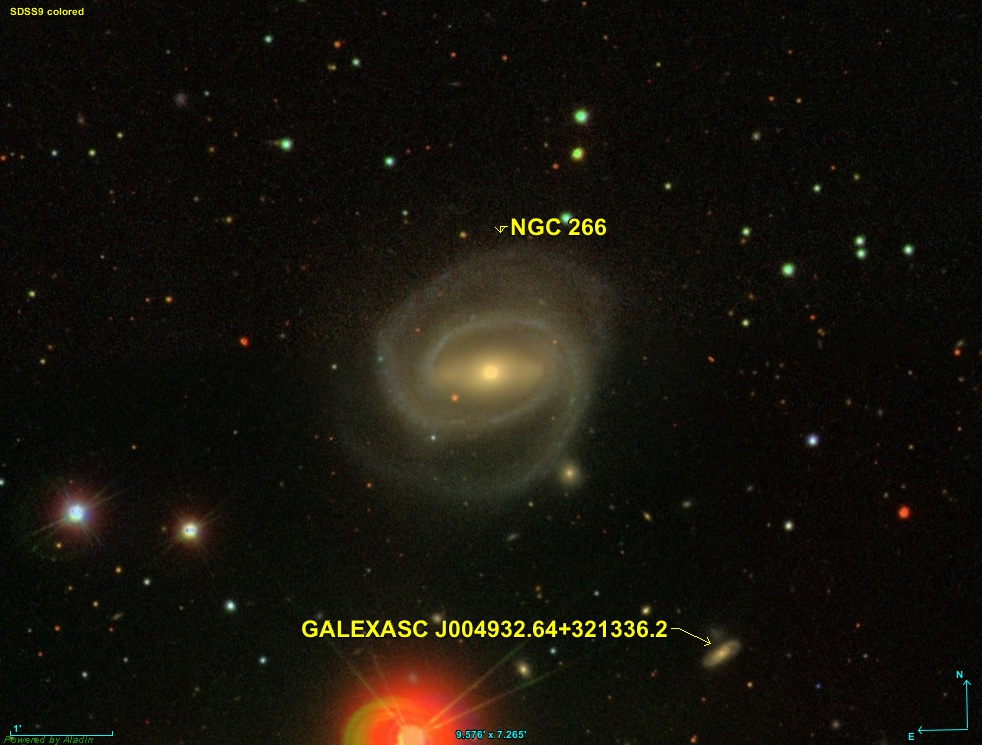
NGC 266 (SDSS)

== See also ==
- List of NGC objects (1–1000)
