= NGC 243 =

Lenticular galaxy in constellation Andromeda

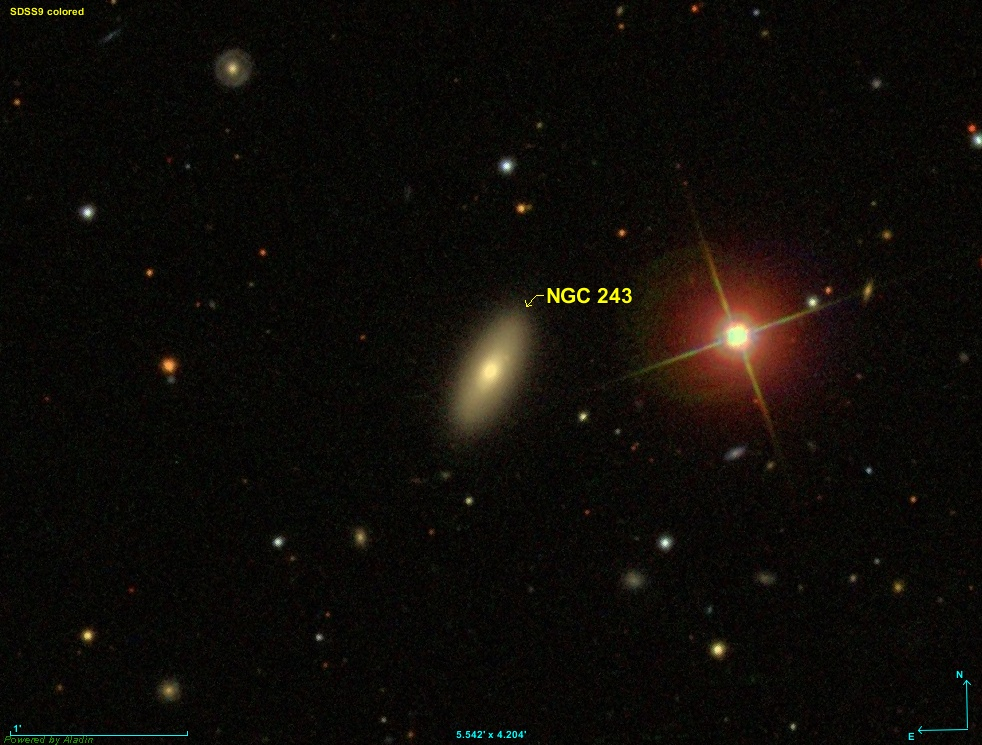
- SDSS image of NGC 243

Observation data (J2000 epoch)
- Constellation: Andromeda
- Right ascension: 00^{h} 46^{m} 00.9^{s}
- Declination: +29° 57′ 34″
- Redshift: 0.015968
- Group or cluster: NGC 315 Group
- Apparent magnitude (V): 14.62

Characteristics
- Type: S0
- Apparent size (V): 0.9' × 0.4'

Other designations
- CGCG 500-082, CGCG 501-001, MCG +05-02-043, 2MASX J00460086+2957340, 2MASXi J0046008+295733, PGC 2687.

NGC 243 is a lenticular galaxy located in the constellation Andromeda. It was discovered on October 18, 1881 by Édouard Stephan.

According to A.M. Garcia, NGC 243 is a member of the NGC 315 Group (also known as LGG 14). This group contains 42 galaxies, including NGC 226, NGC 262, NGC 266, NGC 311, NGC 315, NGC 338, IC 43, IC 66, AND IC 69, among others.
