= David Malin =

British-Australian astronomer and photographer (born 1941)

David Malin AM
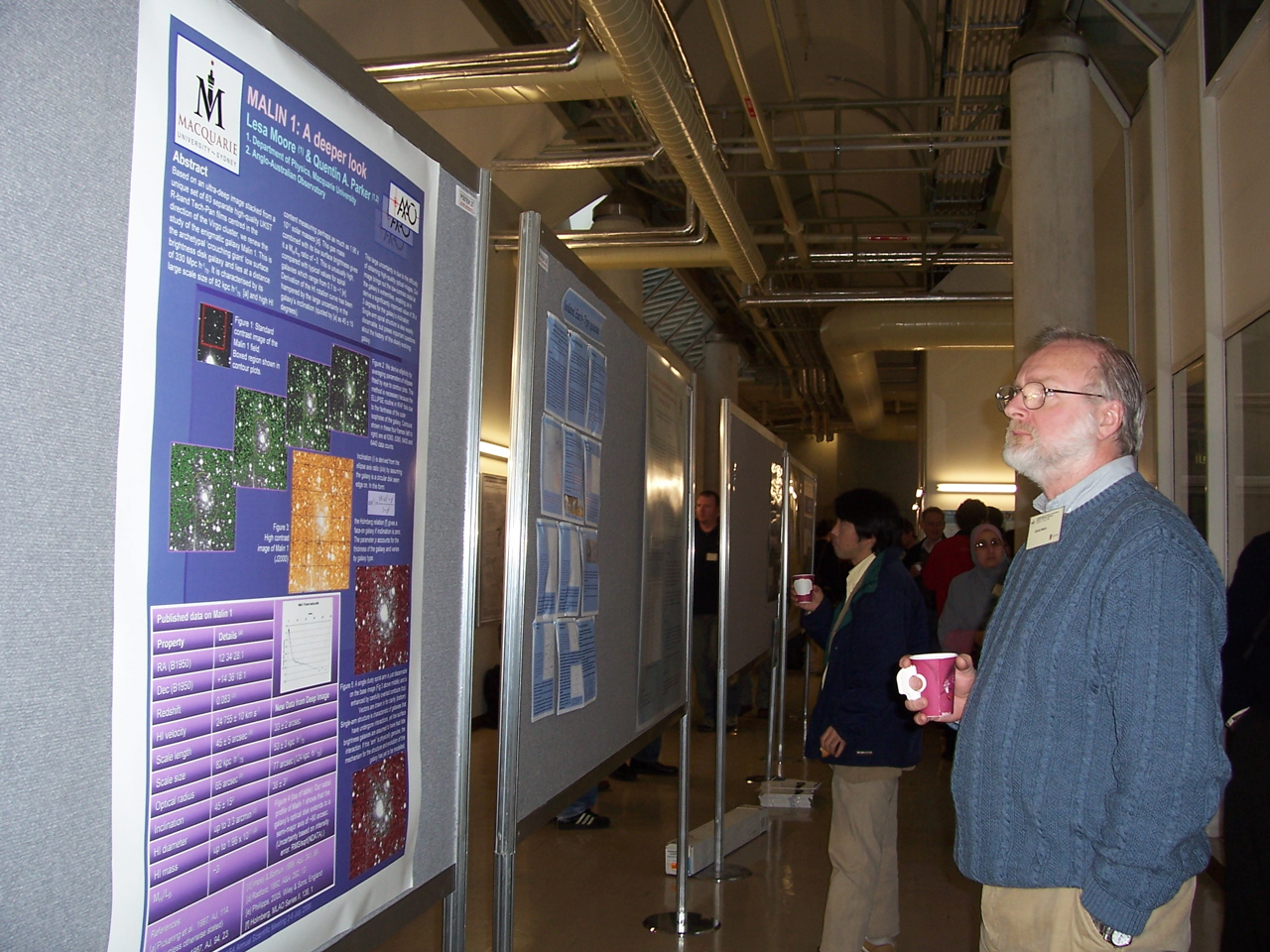
- Malin observing a poster of Malin 1, a galaxy he discovered in 1986.
- Born: 28 March 1941 (age 85); Bury, Lancashire, England
- Citizenship: Australian
- Occupation: Astronomer

Three-colour photograph of the Horsehead Nebula taken by David Malin at the AAO

David Frederick Malin AM (born 28 March 1941) is a British-Australian astronomer and astrophotographer. He is principally known for discovering the gigantic spiral galaxy Malin 1 in 1986, as well as his colour images and photographic processing techniques of astronomical objects.

== Career ==
Malin was born in 1941 and raised in Heywood, Greater Manchester, England. He was trained as a chemist and originally worked as a microscopist. In 1975 he moved to Sydney to take up a job with the Anglo-Australian Observatory (AAO), now the Australian Astronomical Observatory.

Whilst working at the AAO, Malin developed several photographic processing techniques to maximise the ability to extract faint and low contrast detail from the non-linear response and high densities of photographic plates.

These techniques were initially devised to enhance the scientific return from photography, but Malin is now best known for the series of three-colour wide field images of deep space objects which have been widely published as posters and in books around the world. Most professional astronomical photographs are monochromatic; if colour pictures are required, three images are needed. During his career at the AAO, Malin made about 150 three-colour images of deep sky objects, mostly using plates taken with the 4-metre (160 in) Anglo-Australian Telescope and the 1.2-metre (47 in) UK Schmidt Telescope.

The true-colour images are assembled from three separate monochromatic photographs taken through red, green and blue filters. Each photographic plate is a special black and white emulsion designed for low light conditions and is further enhanced for low light sensitivity by baking in a nitrogen and hydrogen atmosphere. The exposure times are relatively long, varying between 5–60 minutes for each colour, depending on the luminosity of the object. The colour image is re-assembled in the darkroom, where further techniques such as unsharp masking to enhance fine detail might also be applied.

In 1986 he discovered Malin 1, a giant spiral galaxy located 1.19 billion light-years (366 Mpc) away in the constellation Coma Berenices, near the North Galactic Pole. As of February 2015 it is the largest spiral galaxy so far discovered, with an approximate diameter of 650,000 light-years (200,000 pc).

Since the early 1990s, silver-based astrophotography has been largely superseded by digital sensors, but many of the technical advances Malin introduced to the field have been carried over to processing astrophotography on computers.

Malin has published over 250 academic papers on the Astrophysics Data System (ADS) and ten books.

In 2001 he retired from the AAO to concentrate on his own business, David Malin Images, which manages his and fellow photographer's collections of images.

== Awards ==
- 1985: Henri Chrétien Award of the American Astronomical Society
- 1986: Jackson-Gwilt Medal, Royal Astronomical Society
- 1990: Rodman Medal of the Royal Photographic Society
- 1993: Progress Medal, highest award of the Photographic Society of America
- 1993: Commonwealth Medal of the Australian Photographic Society
- 1994: University of NSW Press/Eureka Science Book Prize (for "A View of the Universe")
- 1998: Elected Fellow of the International Academy of Astronautics
- 2000: Lennart Nilsson Award for outstanding imaging in science
- 2003: Honorary Doctorate of Applied Science from RMIT University
- 2006: Hubble Award of the Advanced Imaging Conference
- 2019: Member of the Order of Australia

The minor planet 4766 Malin, discovered by Eleanor Helin, is also named after him.

== Selected publications ==
- Malin, David (1993). A View of the Universe. Sterling Publishing Company Incorporated. ISBN 9780933346666.
- Malin, David (1996). Night Skies: The Art of Deep Space : an Exhibition of Astronomical Photographs. British Council. ISBN 9780959586541.
- Malin, David (1999). The Invisible Universe. Little, Brown and Company. ISBN 9780821226285.
- Malin, David; Roucoux, Katherine (2007). Heaven & Earth (Reprinted. ed.). London: Phaidon. ISBN 978-0714847603.
- Gendler, Robert; Christensen, Lars Lindberg; Malin, David (2011). Treasures of the Southern Sky. Springer Science & Business Media. ISBN 9781461406280.
- Goldsmith, John M.; Malin, David (2015). The Universe, Yours to Discover: Celebrating Highlights from the First Five Years of Astronomical Imagery Presented at Astrofest, 2009 - 2014. Celestial Visions. ISBN 9780994248961.
- Malin, David; Frew, David (2016). Hartung's Astronomical Objects For Southern Telescopes. Melbourne University Publishing. ISBN 9780522871241.

== See also ==
- Malin 1
- List of largest galaxies
