= NGC 311 =

Lenticular galaxy in the constellation Pisces

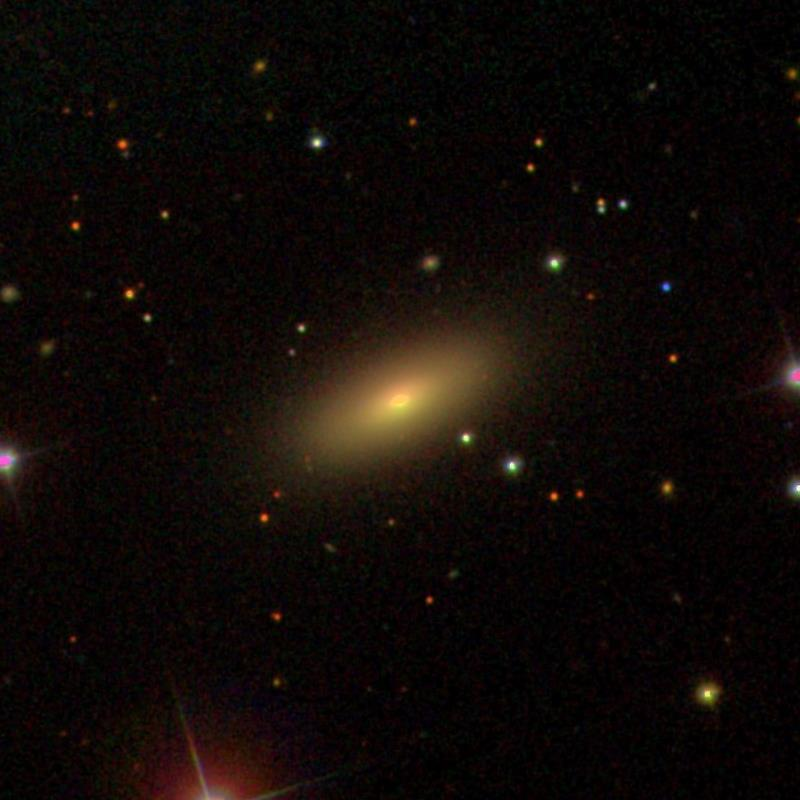
- SDSS image of NGC 311

Observation data (J2000 epoch)
- Constellation: Pisces
- Right ascension: 00^{h} 57^{m} 32.7291^{s}
- Declination: +30° 16′ 50.707″
- Redshift: 0.016489
- Heliocentric radial velocity: 4943 ± 14 km/s
- Distance: 223.0 ± 15.7 Mly (68.37 ± 4.80 Mpc)
- Apparent magnitude (V): 14.00

Characteristics
- Type: S0
- Size: ~128,000 ly (39.24 kpc) (estimated)
- Apparent size (V): 1.5' × 0.8'

Other designations
- 2MASX J00573274+3016508, UGC 592, MCG +05-03-028, PGC 3434, CGCG 501-049.

NGC 311 is a lenticular galaxy in the constellation Pisces. Its velocity with respect to the cosmic microwave background is 4636 ± 25 km/s, which corresponds to a Hubble distance of 223.0 ± 15.7 Mly (68.37 ± 4.80 Mpc). However, one non-redshift measurement gives a distance of 270 Mly (82 Mpc). It was discovered on September 18, 1828, by British astronomer John Herschel.

According to A.M. Garcia, NGC 311 is a member of the NGC 315 Group (also known as LGG 14). This group contains 42 galaxies, including NGC 226, NGC 243, NGC 262, NGC 266, NGC 315, NGC 338, IC 43, IC 66, AND IC 69, among others.

== See also ==
- List of NGC objects (1–1000)
