= NGC 226 =

Spiral galaxy in the constellation Andromeda

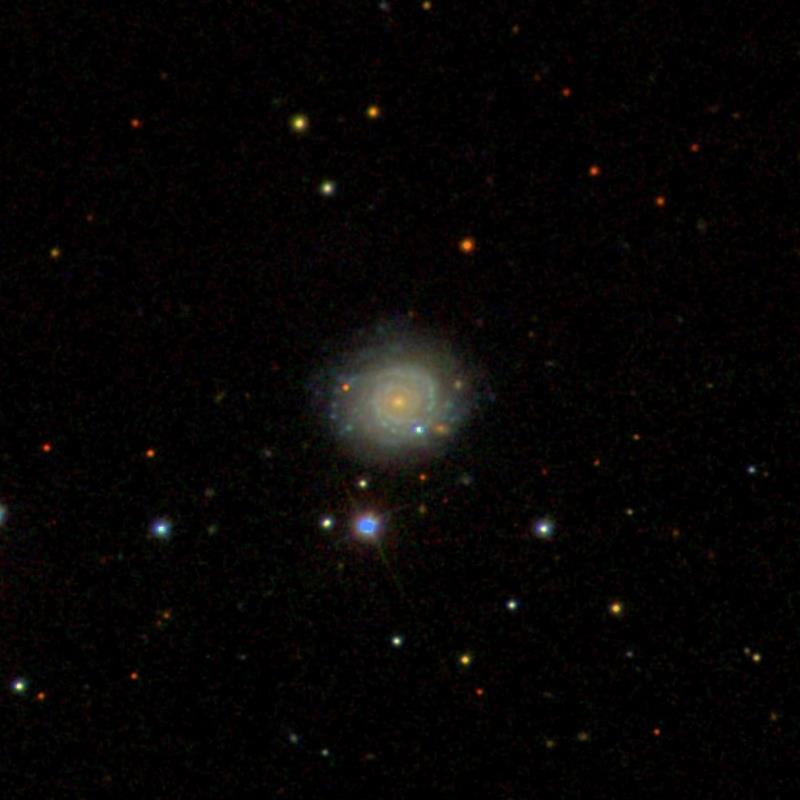
- SDSS image of NGC 226

Observation data (J2000 epoch)
- Constellation: Andromeda
- Right ascension: 00^{h} 42^{m} 54.0^{s}
- Declination: +32° 34′ 51″
- Redshift: 0.016094
- Distance: 216 Mly
- Group or cluster: NGC 315 Group
- Apparent magnitude (V): 14.31

Characteristics
- Type: S
- Apparent size (V): 0.9' × 0.9'

Other designations
- UGC 00459, CGCG 500-076, 2MASX J00425403+3234516, 2MASXi J0042540+323451, IRAS 00402+3218, F00401+3218, PGC 2572.

NGC 226 is a spiral galaxy located approximately 216 million light-years from the Sun in the constellation Andromeda. It was discovered on December 21, 1786, by William Herschel.

According to A.M. Garcia, NGC 226 is a member of the NGC 315 Group (also known as LGG 14). This group contains 42 galaxies, including NGC 243, NGC 262, NGC 266, NGC 311, NGC 315, NGC 338, IC 43, IC 66, AND IC 69, among others.

== See also ==
- Spiral galaxy
- List of NGC objects (1–1000)
- Andromeda (constellation)
