= NGC 338 =

Spiral galaxy in the constellation Pisces

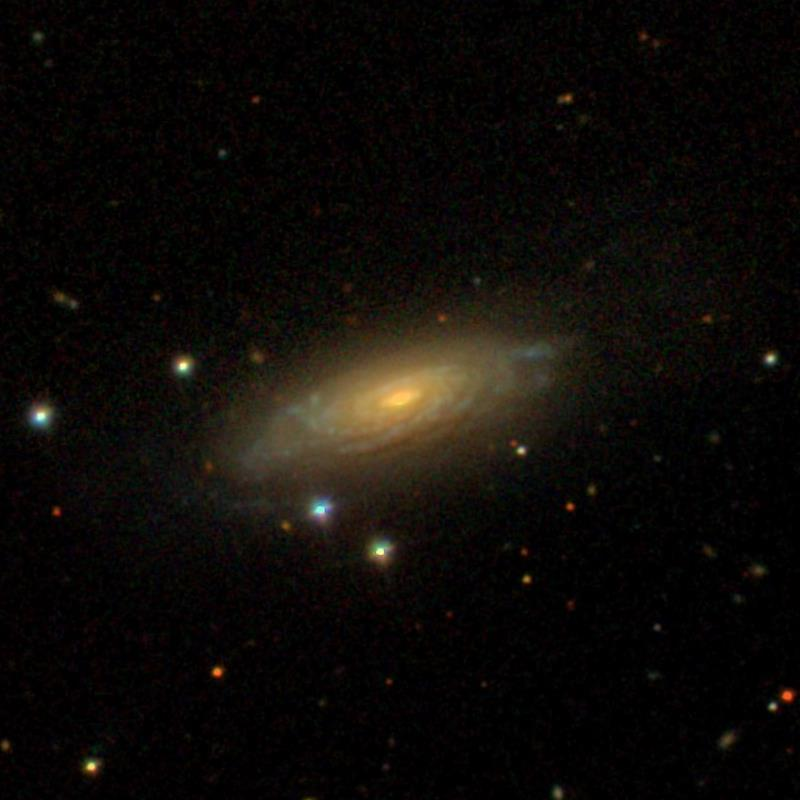
- NGC 338 imaged by SDSS

Observation data (J2000 epoch)
- Constellation: Pisces
- Right ascension: 01^{h} 00^{m} 36.4102^{s}
- Declination: +30° 40′ 08.521″
- Redshift: 0.015958
- Heliocentric radial velocity: 4784 ± 3
- Distance: 215.5 ± 15.1 Mly (66.07 ± 4.64 Mpc)
- Group or cluster: NGC 315 Group
- Apparent magnitude (V): 13.67

Characteristics
- Type: Sab
- Size: ~137,300 ly (42.10 kpc) (estimated)
- Apparent size (V): 1.9' × 0.6'

Other designations
- IRAS 00578+3024, 2MASX J01003640+3040081, UGC 624, MCG +05-03-034, PGC 3611, CGCG 501-061

NGC 338 is a spiral galaxy in the constellation Pisces. Its velocity with respect to the cosmic microwave background is 4479 ± 22 km/s, which corresponds to a Hubble distance of 215.5 ± 15.1 Mly (66.07 ± 4.64 Mpc). In addition, 22 non-redshift measurements give a distance of 223.56 ± 5.04 Mly (68.545 ± 1.544 Mpc). It was discovered in 1877 by Wilhelm Tempel. It was described by Dreyer as "very faint, very small, irregular figure, brighter middle."

According to A.M. Garcia, NGC 338 is a member of the NGC 315 Group (also known as LGG 14). This group contains 42 galaxies, including NGC 226, NGC 243, NGC 262, NGC 266, NGC 311, NGC 315, IC 43, IC 66, AND IC 69, among others.

== See also ==
- List of NGC objects (1–1000)
