= Malin 1 =

Spiral galaxy in the constellation Coma Berenices

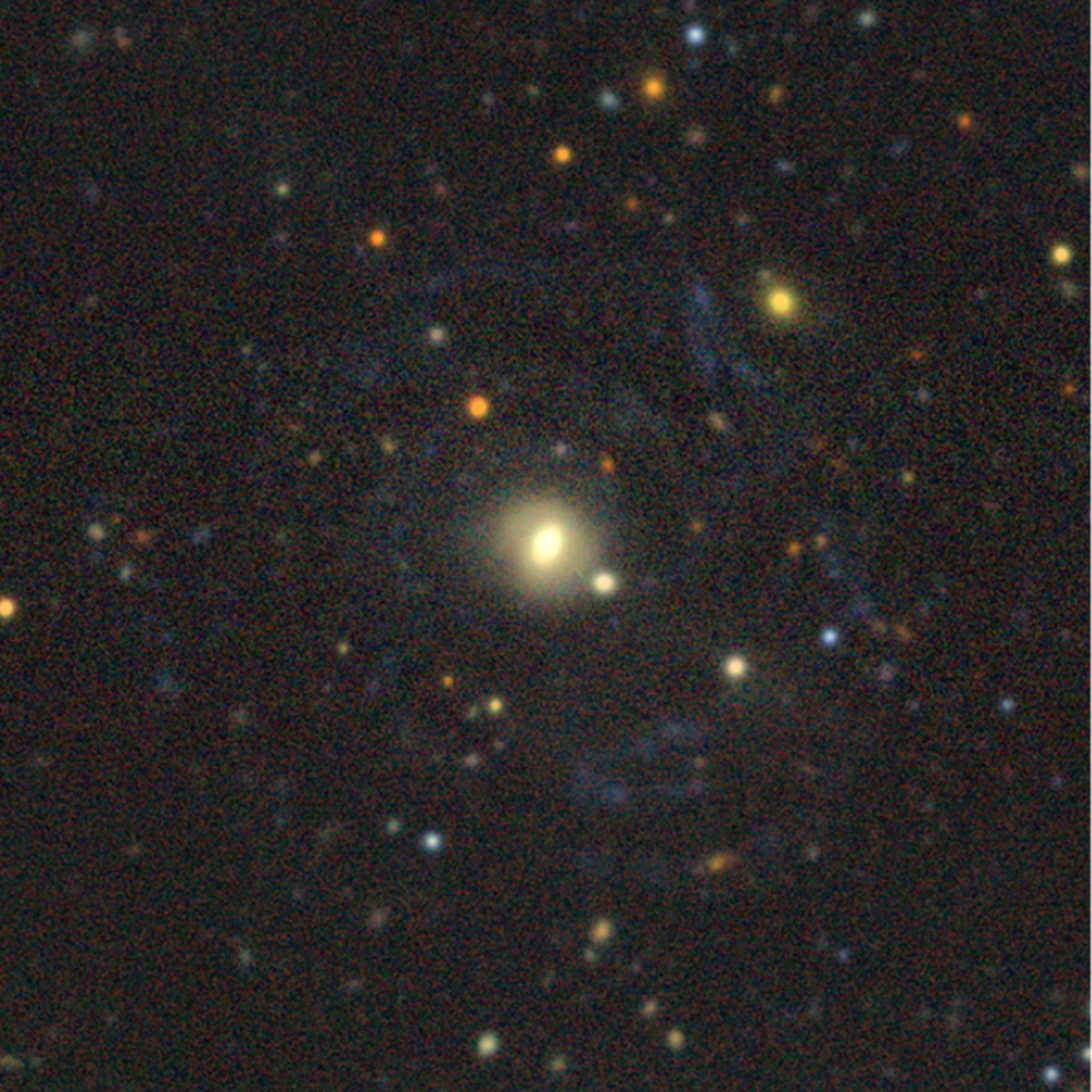
- Image by the DESI Legacy Imaging Surveys, Data Release 10

Observation data (J2000.0 epoch)
- Constellation: Coma Berenices
- Right ascension: 12^{h} 36^{m} 59.34697^{s}
- Declination: +14° 19′ 49.1585″
- Redshift: 0.082702±0.000013
- Heliocentric radial velocity: 24750±10 km/s
- Galactocentric velocity: 24707±10 km/s
- Apparent magnitude (V): 15.809±0.009
- Absolute magnitude (V): −22.01±0.50

Characteristics
- Type: SB0a
- Mass: ~10^{12} M_{☉}
- Size: 34.11 to 36.39 kpc (111,250 to 118,690 ly) (diameter; D_{25.0} B-band and 2MASS K-band total isophotes) (Note: The quoted diameter in this infobox was based on NED's provided scale "Virgo + GA + Shapley" of 1.811 kpc/arcsec multiplied with given angular diameters.)
- Apparent size (V): 0.25′ × 0.23′
- Notable features: Surrounded by a H I disk

Other designations
- PGC 42102, LEDA 42102, VPC 1091, 2MASX J12365934+1419494, Gaia DR2 3932516418935413504

Malin 1 is a giant low surface brightness (LSB) spiral galaxy in the constellation Coma Berenices. It is located 1.19 billion light-years (366 Mpc) away near the North Galactic Pole, and is one of the largest known spiral galaxies, with an approximate diameter of 650,000 light-years (200,000 pc); this makes Malin 1 over six times the diameter of our Milky Way. It was discovered by astronomer David Malin in 1986, from which it derives its name, and is the first LSB galaxy verified to exist. Its bright center, an SB0a-type barred-spiral, is 30,000 light-years (9,200 pc) across, with a bulge of 10,000 light-years (3,100 pc).

== Structure ==
The galaxy exhibits giant and very faint spiral arms, with some segments estimated to be nearly 650,000 light-years (200,000 pc) in diameter. Observations by Galaz et al. in April 2014 revealed a detailed view of the spiral structure of Malin 1 in optical bands. Other details, such as possible stellar streams and formation regions, are revealed as well.

Malin 1 is unique in several ways: its diameter alone makes it the largest barred spiral galaxy ever to have been observed. Furthermore, it was found to possibly be interacting with two other galaxies, Malin 1B and SDSS J123708.91+142253.2; Malin 1B is estimated to be located 46,000 light-years (14,000 pc) away from the high surface brightness central spiral of Malin 1, which may be responsible for the formation of the galaxy's central bar. Meanwhile, SDSS J123708.91+142253.2 is located within the huge, faint halo of Malin 1 and might have caused the formation of the extended low surface brightness disc through tidal stripping.

== Malin 1B ==
Malin 1B is a possible companion galaxy located at 2h 36m 58.89s and +14◦ 19′ 43.9′′ that may have interacted with Malin 1 and influenced its unusually large structure. It is primarily composed of intergalactic filament, likely as an originally larger galaxy that shrank due to the tidal forces that it experienced during its merger with Malin 1.

== Gallery ==
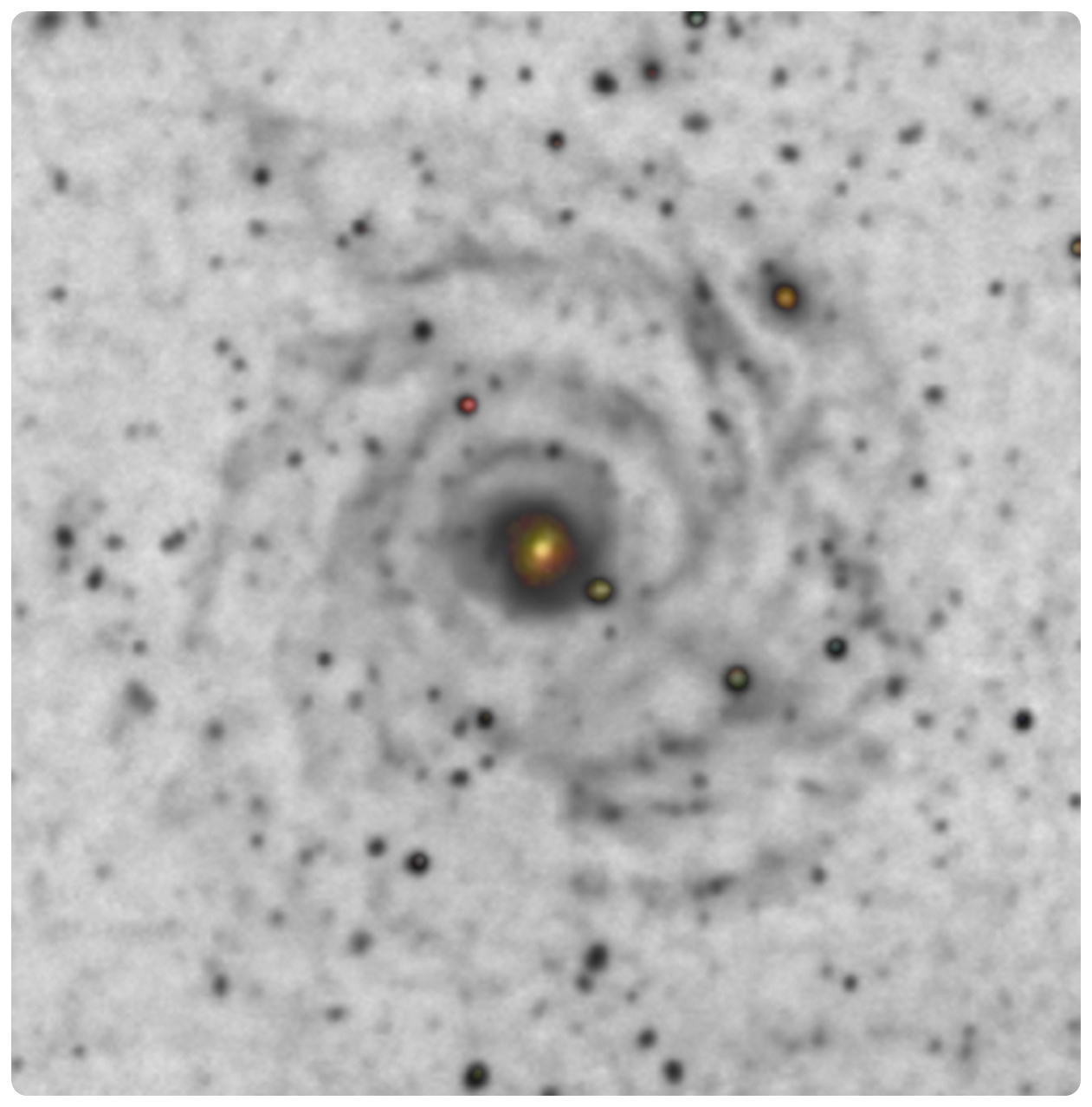
Processed image of Malin 1 by Giuseppe Donatiello, showing its weak spiral arms; Malin 1B is visible as the second dark spot in the lower-right of the main galaxy, and SDSS J123708.91+142253.2 is to the top right.

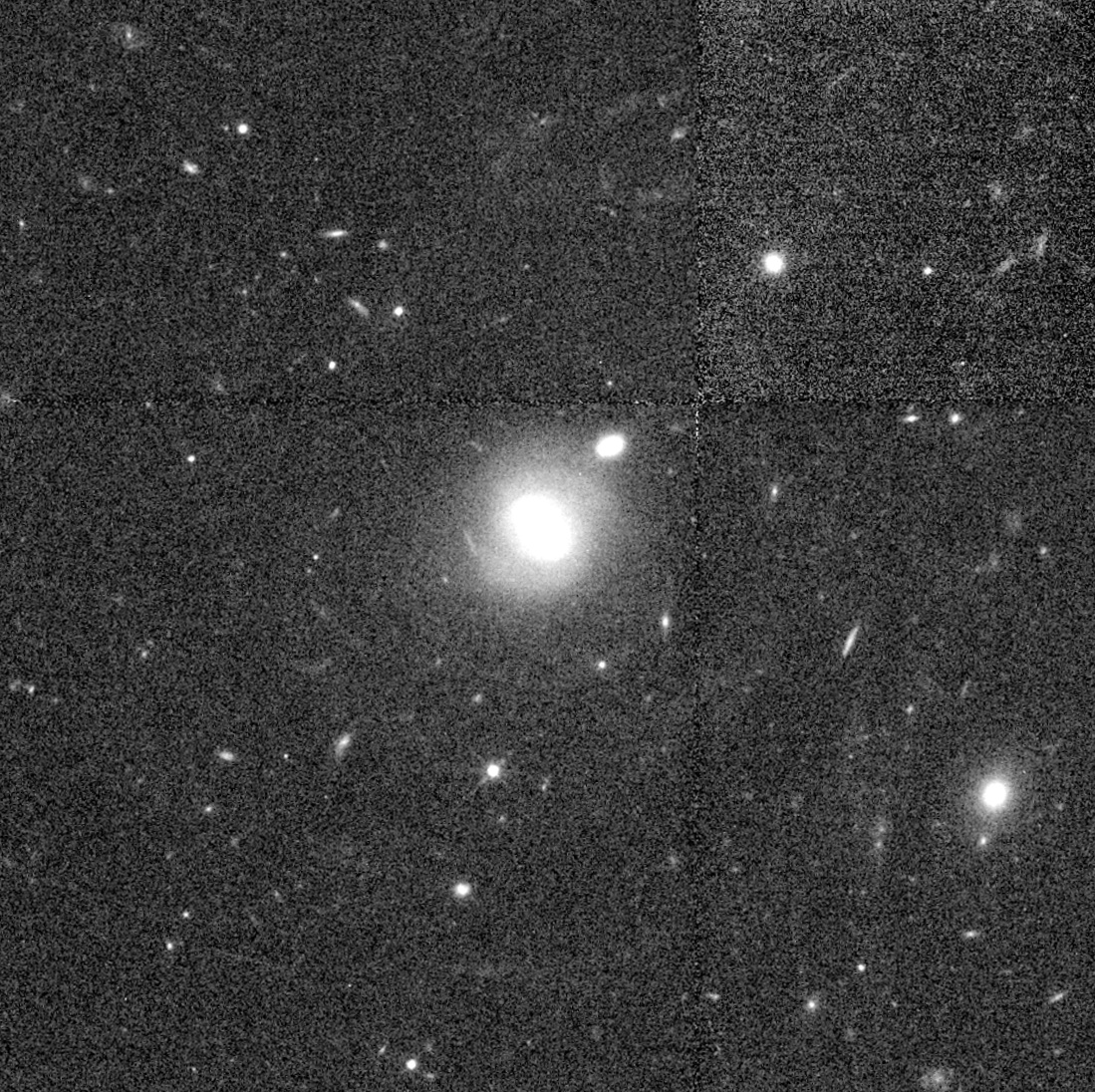
Malin 1 imaged in grayscale by the Hubble Space Telescope

== See also ==
- List of largest galaxies
- NGC 262, spiral galaxy surrounded by a huge H I cloud
- NGC 6872, large interacting barred spiral galaxy claimed in 2013 as largest spiral galaxy
- UGC 2885, a large unbarred spiral galaxy
