= NGC 315 =

Galaxy in the constellation Pisces

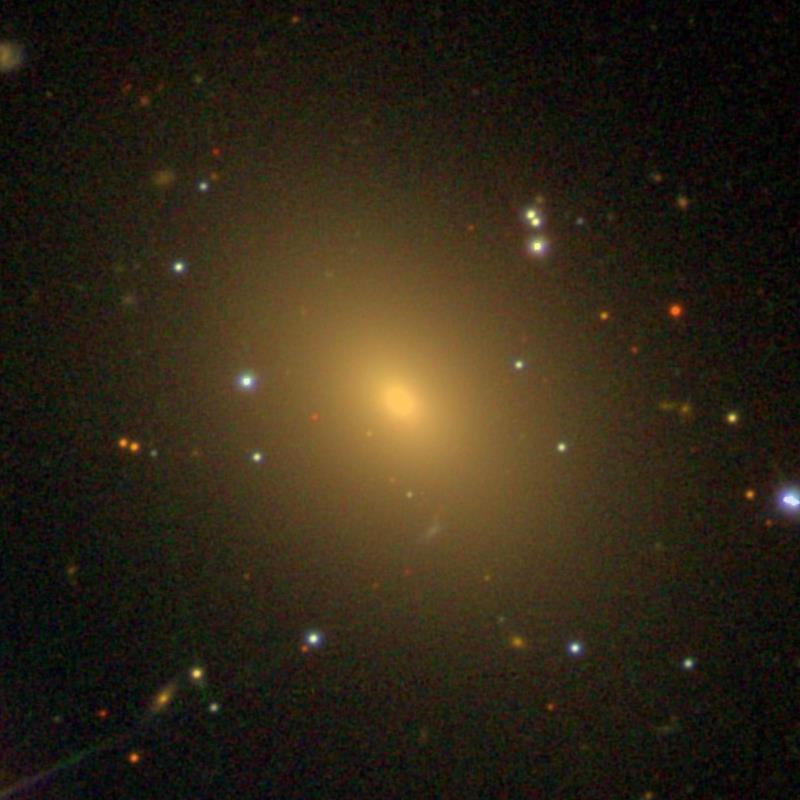
- SDSS image of NGC 315

Observation data (J2000 epoch)
- Constellation: Pisces
- Right ascension: 00^{h} 57^{m} 48.8833^{s}
- Declination: +30° 21′ 08.811″
- Redshift: 0.016485
- Heliocentric radial velocity: 4,942 km/s
- Distance: 223.0 ± 15.7 Mly (68.36 ± 4.80 Mpc)
- Group or cluster: NGC 315 Group
- Apparent magnitude (V): 12.2

Characteristics
- Type: E
- Size: ~196,400 ly (60.21 kpc) (estimated)
- Apparent size (V): 2.08' × 1.54'

Other designations
- B2 0055+30, TXS 0055+300, GB6 J0057+3021, HOLM 028A, IRAS F00550+3004, 2MASX J00574891+3021083, UGC 597, MCG +05-03-031, PGC 3455, CGCG 501-052

NGC 315 is a massive elliptical galaxy in the constellation Pisces. Its velocity with respect to the cosmic microwave background is 4635 ± 22 km/s, which corresponds to a Hubble distance of 223.0 ± 15.7 Mly (68.36 ± 4.80 Mpc). In addition, eight non-redshift measurements give a distance of 208.58 ± 22.28 Mly (63.950 ± 6.830 Mpc). It was discovered by German-British astronomer William Herschel on September 11, 1784.

The SIMBAD database lists NGC 315 as a LINER galaxy, i.e. a galaxy whose nucleus has an emission spectrum characterized by broad lines of weakly ionized atoms.

According to A.M. Garcia, NGC 315 is the namesake of the NGC 315 Group (also known as LGG 14). This group contains 42 galaxies, including NGC 226, NGC 243, NGC 262, NGC 266, NGC 311, NGC 338, IC 43, IC 66, AND IC 69, among others. NGC 315, along with triple star NGC 313, and star NGC 316 are listed together as Holm 28 in Erik Holmberg's A Study of Double and Multiple Galaxies Together with Inquiries into some General Metagalactic Problems, published in 1937.

The shape of NGC 315 is a triaxial ellipsoid that is highly prolate; its middle-to-long axis ratio is 0.854 and short-to-long axis ratio is 0.833. It has a stellar mass of 1.5×10^{12} M_{☉}. At the center of the galaxy is a supermassive black hole with a mass of 3.0×10^{9} M_{☉}.

== See also ==
- List of NGC objects (1–1000)
