= IC 4710 =

Irregular galaxy in the constellation Pavo

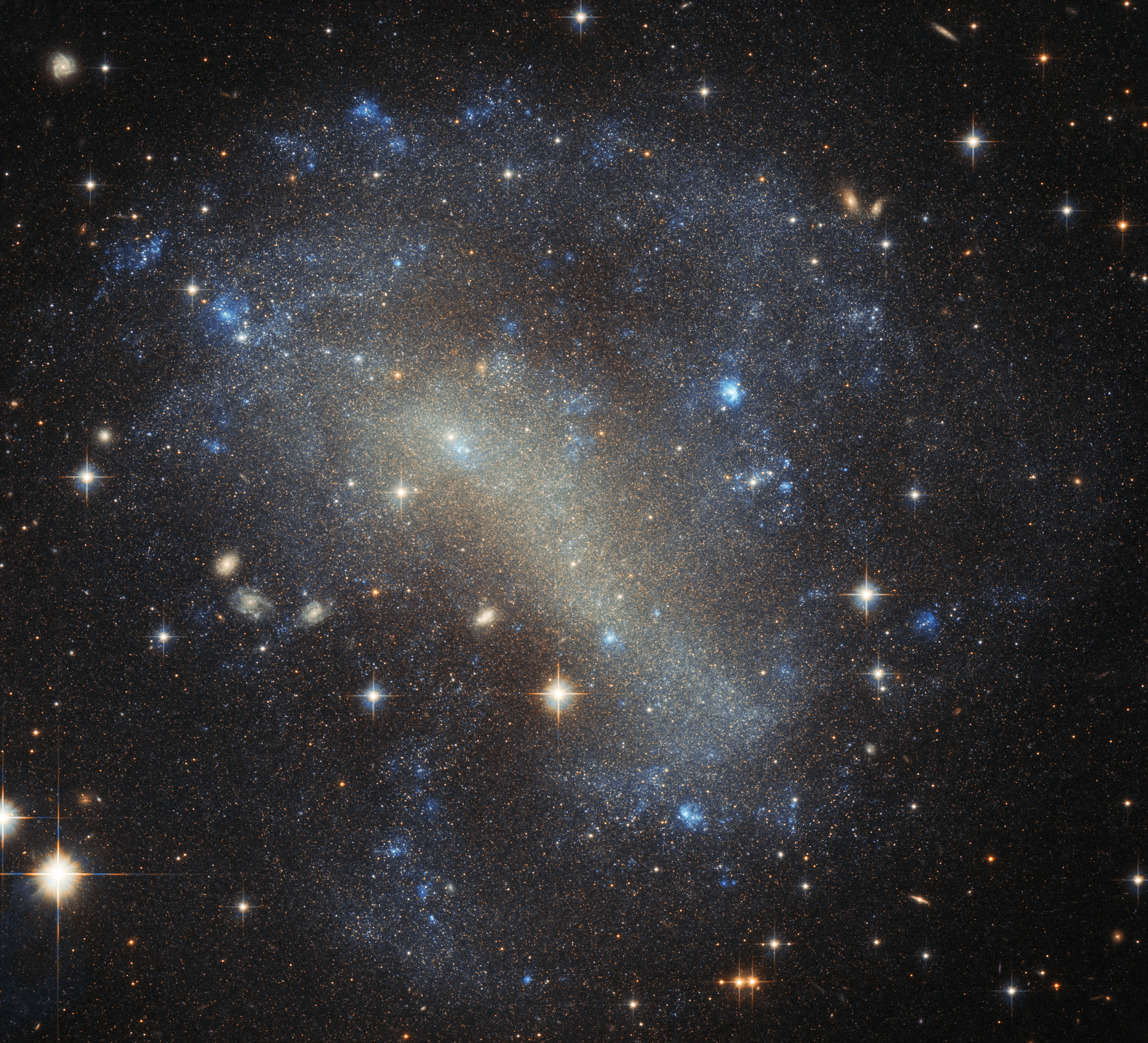
- Hubble Space Telescope image of IC 4710

Observation data (J2000 epoch)
- Constellation: Pavo
- Right ascension: 18^{h} 28.3^{m}
- Declination: −66° 58′
- Distance: 10.3 megaparsecs (34 Mly)
- Apparent magnitude (V): 11.9

Characteristics
- Type: Irr; SB(s)m
- Apparent size (V): 3.6′ × 2.8′ (36,000 light-years in diameter)

Other designations
- LEDA 61922, IRAS 18235-6700, PGC 61922, ESO 103-22

IC 4710 is a Magellanic spiral galaxy in the southern constellation of Pavo, roughly 34 million light-years away. Discovered on 18 August, 1900 by astronomer DeLisle Stewart, it contains numerous major starburst regions and particularly bright, blue regions within the arm and outer edges of the galaxy. It has a diameter of 36,000 light-years and an apparent magnitude of 11.9.

== Structure ==
IC 4710 is classified as a dwarf peculiar galaxy and a barred Magellanic spiral. Its inner galactic nuclei consists of a mix of fainter red dwarf stars and younger, brighter blue giants, the latter of which makes up the majority of the star population both within the galaxy's arm and its galactic halo.

IC 4710 lies in the southern constellation of Pavo (The Peacock), which also contains the spiral galaxy which is a Milky Way mimic, NGC 6744.
