= SN 2005gl =

2005 supernova in the galaxy NGC 266

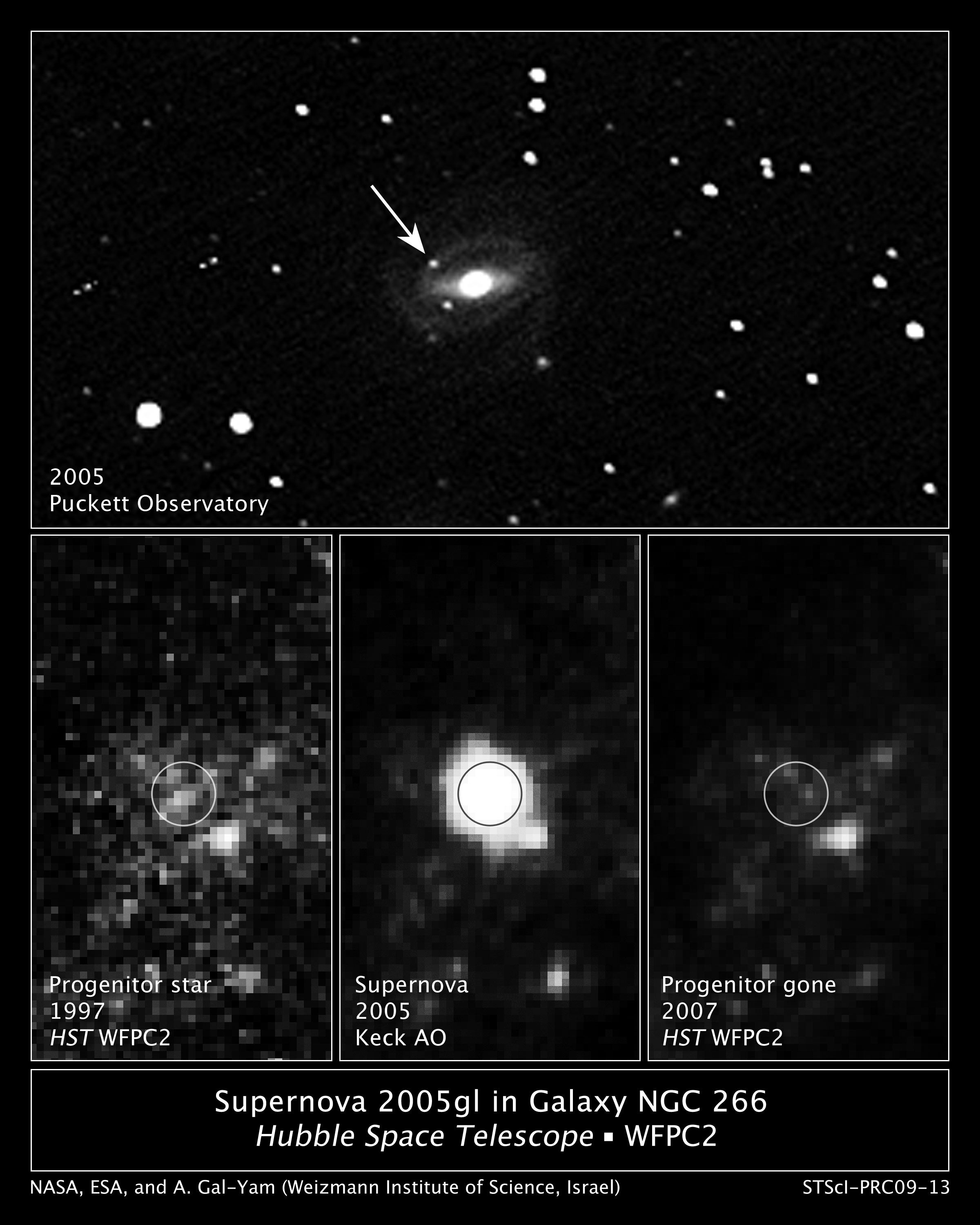
- Supernova 2005gl in galaxy NGC 266
- Event type: Supernova
- Type IIn
- Date: 2005-10-05
- Constellation: Pisces
- Right ascension: 00^{h} 49^{m} 50.02^{s}
- Declination: +32° 16′ 56.8″
- Epoch: J2000.0
- Distance: 66 Mpc
- Host: NGC 266
- Progenitor: NGC266_LBV 1
- Progenitor type: Luminous blue variable
- Peak apparent magnitude: 16.17
- Other designations: SN 2005gl
- Related media on Commons

SN 2005gl was a supernova in the barred-spiral galaxy NGC 266. It was discovered using CCD frames taken October 5, 2005, from the 60 cm automated telescope at the Puckett Observatory in Georgia, US, and reported by Tim Puckett in collaboration with Peter Ceravolo. It was independently identified by Yasuo Sano in Japan. The supernova event took place sometime between September 10 and October 5 of 2005. It was located 29.8″ east and 16.7″ north of the galactic core. Based upon its spectrum, this was classified as a Type IIn core-collapse supernova. It has a redshift of z = 0.016, which is the same as the host galaxy.

Using archived images from the Hubble Space Telescope, a candidate progenitor star was identified. This is believed to have been a luminous blue variable (LBV), similar to Eta Carinae, with an absolute magnitude of −10.3 and a surface temperature of about 13,000 K. There was a small probability that the source was instead located in a compact cluster of stars, but the association with the LBV has since been reliably established.
