= NGC 6872 =

Galaxy in the constellation Pavo

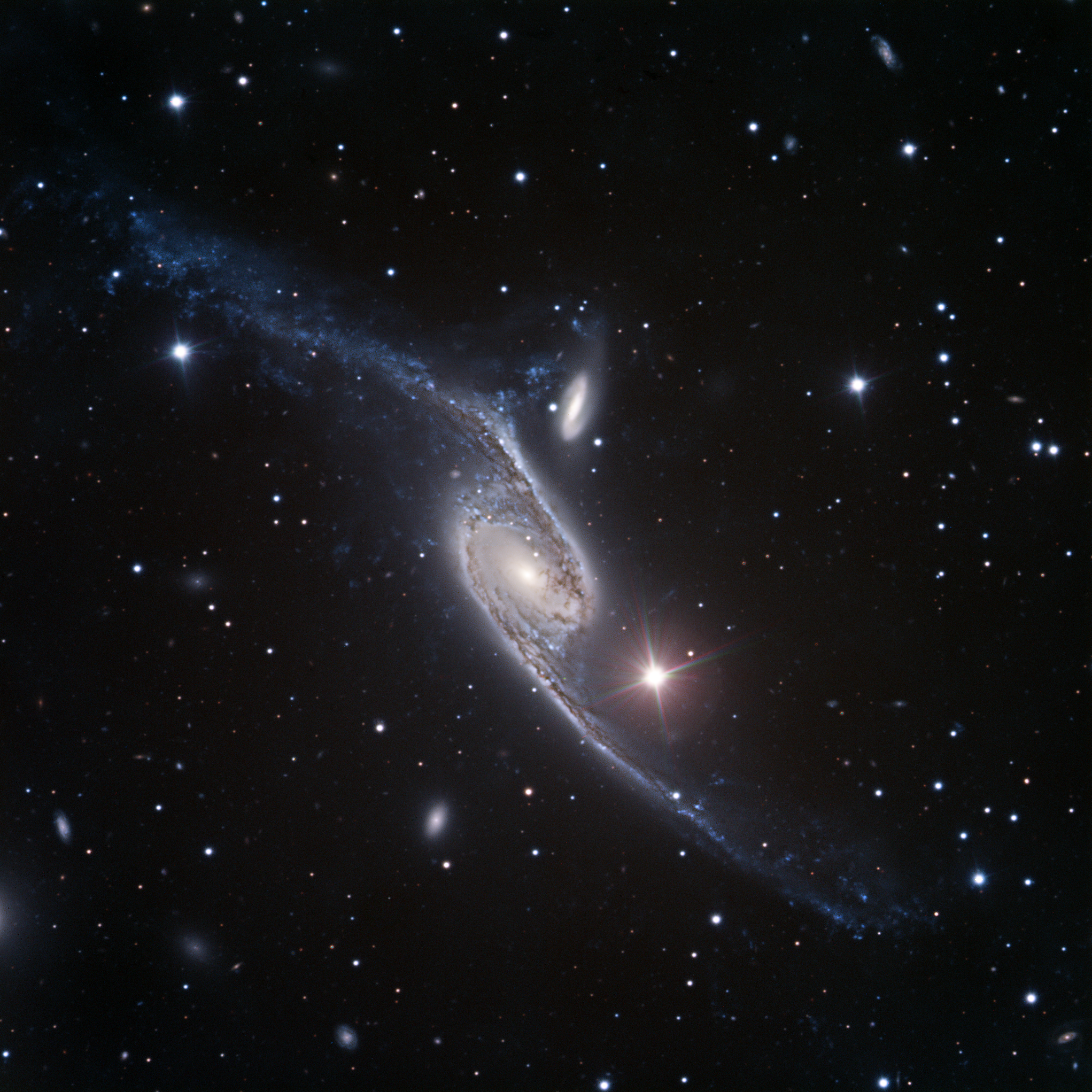
- NGC 6872 (center) with IC 4970 (above)

Observation data (J2000 epoch)
- Constellation: Pavo
- Right ascension: 20^{h} 16^{m} 56.558^{s}
- Declination: −70° 46′ 04.60″
- Redshift: 0.015194±0.0001
- Heliocentric radial velocity: 4555±30 km/s
- Galactocentric velocity: 4443±30 km/s
- Distance: 212 Mly (65 Mpc)
- Apparent magnitude (V): 10.69
- Absolute magnitude (V): −23.29

Characteristics
- Type: SB(s)b pec
- Mass: >10^{11} M_{☉}
- Size: 219.63 kiloparsecs (716,000 light-years)(diameter; 25.0 mag/arcsec^{2} B-band isophote)
- Apparent size (V): 6.0′ × 1.7′
- Notable features: Interacting galaxy with IC 4970

Other designations
- ESO 73-32, JB a 28-1, LEDA 64413, 2MASX J20165648-7046057, 2E 2011.7-7055

NGC 6872, also known as the Condor Galaxy, is a large barred spiral galaxy of type SB(s)b pec in the constellation Pavo. It is 212 million light-years (65 Mpc) from Earth. NGC 6872 is interacting with the lenticular galaxy IC 4970, which is less than one twelfth as large. The galaxy has two elongated arms with a diameter based on ultraviolet light of over 522,000 light-years (160,000 pc), and a D^{25.5} isophotal diameter of over 717,000 light-years (220,000 pc), making it the largest known spiral galaxy. (Note: Various other spiral galaxies such as Malin 1 and UGC 2885 have larger galactic features such as haloes. But NGC 6872 is the largest known spiral as measured through isophotometry.) (Note: NED quotes a diameter based on a redshift-independent distance measurement. The figure given here is based on its redshift.) The galaxy contains a central black hole with a mass of 269 million solar masses (M_{☉}). It was discovered on 27 June 1835 by English astronomer John Herschel.

== Star formation rates ==
When observed in the ultraviolet and mid-infrared, the central region and bar of NGC 6872 show old stars and low rates of star formation, with rates increasing along the spiral arms as distance from the core increases. The most active region of star formation, located in the northeast arm, shows a stellar flux around 1,000 times higher than in the central region, though this may be affected by the density of stellar dust in the core. The extended portions of both arms exhibit young star cluster formations with ages ranging from one to one hundred million years. Star formation rates in the northeast extended arm are twice that of the southwest extended arm, and five times the formation rate in the sections of the arms closer to the central region.

== Interaction with IC 4970 ==
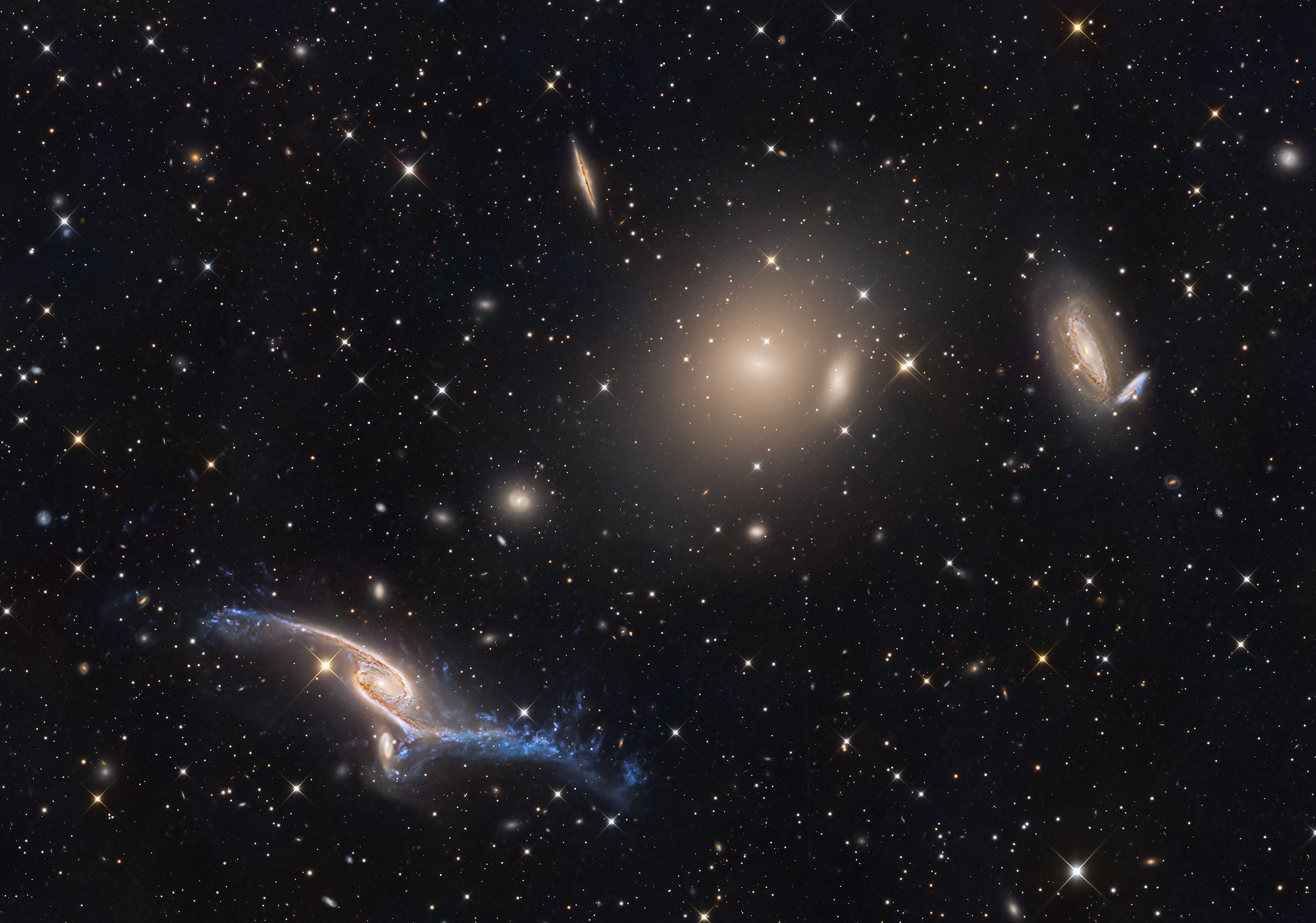
A galaxy group in the constellation of Pavo including NGC 6872.

IC 4970 is a nearby lenticular galaxy, located only a few arcseconds away, and is known to be interacting with NGC 6872. Horrelou and Koribalski (2007), using a computer simulation to determine how the two galaxies were interacting, reported that IC 4970 approached NGC 6872 nearly along the plane of its spiral disk, making its closest approach approximately 130 million years ago and resulting in the latter's current highly elongated shape.

An ultraviolet-to-infrared study by Eufrasio, et al. (2013), using data from GALEX, Spitzer, and other resources found that the interaction between the two galaxies appears to have triggered significant star formation in the northeastern arm of NGC 6872 beginning about 130 thousand light-years (40 kpc) from its nucleus. The same appears to have also occurred in the southwestern arm. A bright ultraviolet source was discovered at the end of the northeastern arm, around 290 thousand light-years (90 kpc) from the nucleus, which may be a tidal dwarf galaxy formed out of the interaction between IC 4970 and NGC 6872. The bright ultraviolet nature of this cluster indicates that it contains stars less than 200 million years old, which roughly coincides with the timeframe of the collision. Mihos, et al. (1993), and Eufrasio, et al. (2014), suggest that prior to its interaction with IC 4970, the galaxy's disk may have been non-uniform with an extended mass distribution.

== Possible interaction with NGC 6876 ==
Machacek, et al. (2005), reported on a 290–330-thousand-light-year (90–100 kpc) X-ray trail that exists between NGC 6872 and the nearby elliptical galaxy NGC 6876. NGC 6872 is moving away from NGC 6876 at 849 ± 28 km/s (528 ± 17 mi/s) in approximately the same trajectory as the X-ray trail, suggesting a link between the two galaxies. Four possibilities for the trail's existence were given: gas stripped from the two galaxies during a close fly-by, intergalactic medium that has been gravitationally focused behind NGC 6872 as it moves, interstellar medium that was stripped from NGC 6872 by ram pressure as it passed through the densest part of the Pavo group, and interstellar medium stripped from NGC 6872 by turbulent viscosity as it passes through Pavo. Any or all of these processes may be responsible for the trail. If NGC 6872 and NGC 6876 did interact in the past, the latter may have affected NGC 6872's arms and gas distribution as much as its interaction with IC 4970.

== See also ==
- Antennae Galaxies
- NGC 2207 and IC 2163
- NGC 5090 and NGC 5091
