= NGC 1291 =

Barred ring galaxy in Eridanus

- NGC 1291 imaged by the Dark Energy Camera (DECam) on the Víctor M. Blanco Telescope at Cerro Tololo Inter-American Observatory, using data from the Dark Energy Survey (2013–2019).

Observation data (J2000 epoch)
- Constellation: Eridanus
- Right ascension: 03^{h} 15^{m} 29.6^{s}
- Declination: −41° 17′ 25.6″
- Redshift: 0.002799 (839 ± 2 km/s)
- Distance: 33 Mly
- Apparent magnitude (V): 9.39
- Absolute magnitude (V): −21.05

Characteristics
- Type: (R_1)SB(l)0/a
- Apparent size (V): 9′.8 × 8′.1
- Notable features: inner bar and outer ring structure

Other designations
- PGC 012209,

NGC 1291, also known as NGC 1269, the Golden Eye Galaxy, or the Snow Collar Galaxy, is a ring galaxy with an unusual inner bar and outer ring structure located about 33 million light-years away in the constellation Eridanus. It was discovered by James Dunlop in 1826 and subsequently entered into the New General Catalogue as NGC 1291 by Johan Ludvig Emil Dreyer. John Herschel then observed the same object in 1836 and entered it into the catalog as NGC 1269 without realizing that it was a duplicate. This galaxy was cited as an example of a "transitional galaxy" by NASA's Galaxy Evolution Explorer team in 2007.

== Properties ==
NGC 1291 faces towards the Solar System nearly face-on. It has a prominent bulge, and is forming stars in its disk, albeit slowly, being a lenticular galaxy.

Like other early-type galaxies, NGC 1291 has a population of old globular clusters. About 65% of them belong to the "blue" population that is more metal-poor, while the rest are "red" and more metal-rich.

The concentric inner and outer disk structures visible in the DECam image are thought to be the result of a past merger with a gas-rich galaxy, with the inner disk further shaped by density waves radiating outward from the galactic center. Data for the image came from the Dark Energy Survey archive (2013–2019), obtained with the Dark Energy Camera (DECam) on the Víctor M. Blanco Telescope at Cerro Tololo Inter-American Observatory.

== Gallery ==
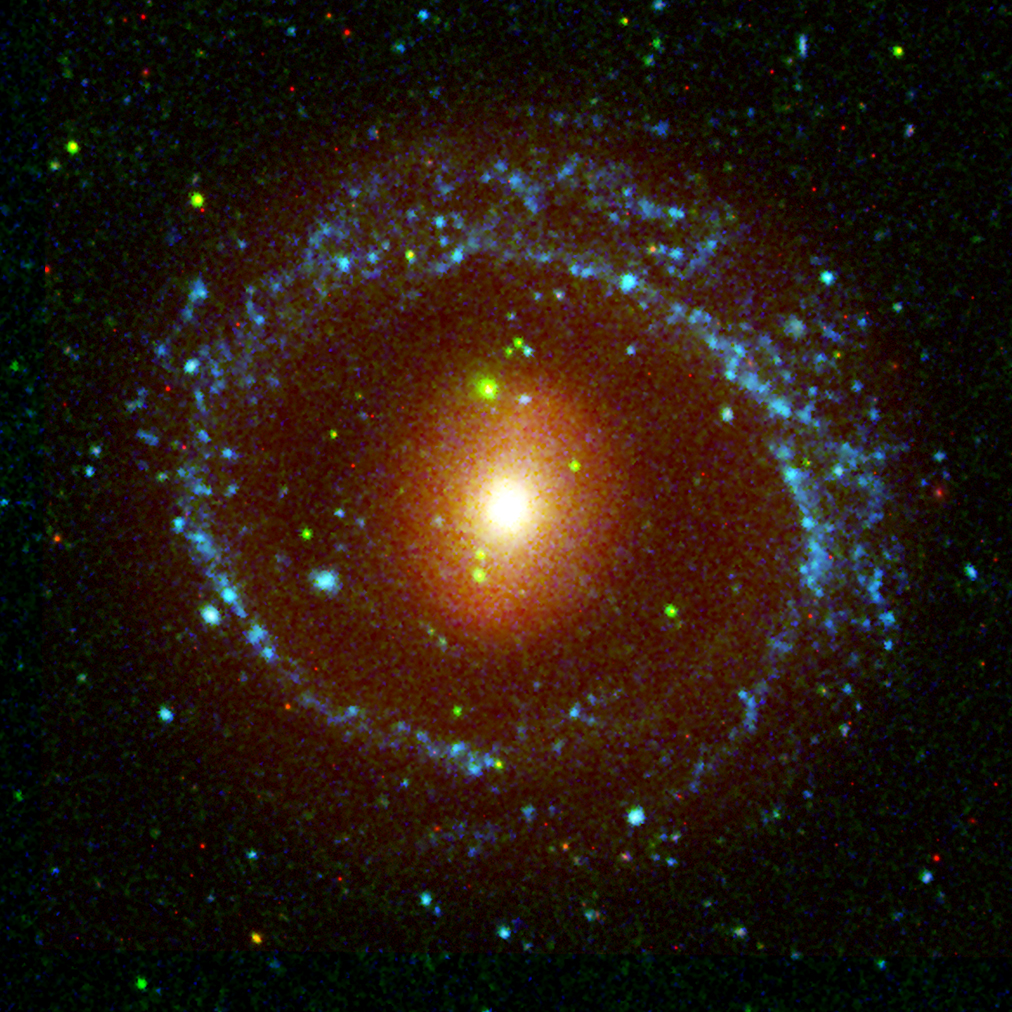
This composite image of NGC 1291 is processed primarily from data collected by NASA's Galaxy Evolution Explorer in December 2003. The blue in this image is ultraviolet light captured by GALEX's long wavelength detector, the green is ultraviolet light detected by its short wavelength detector, and the red in the image is visible light courtesy of data from the Cerro Tololo Inter-American Observatory in Chile.

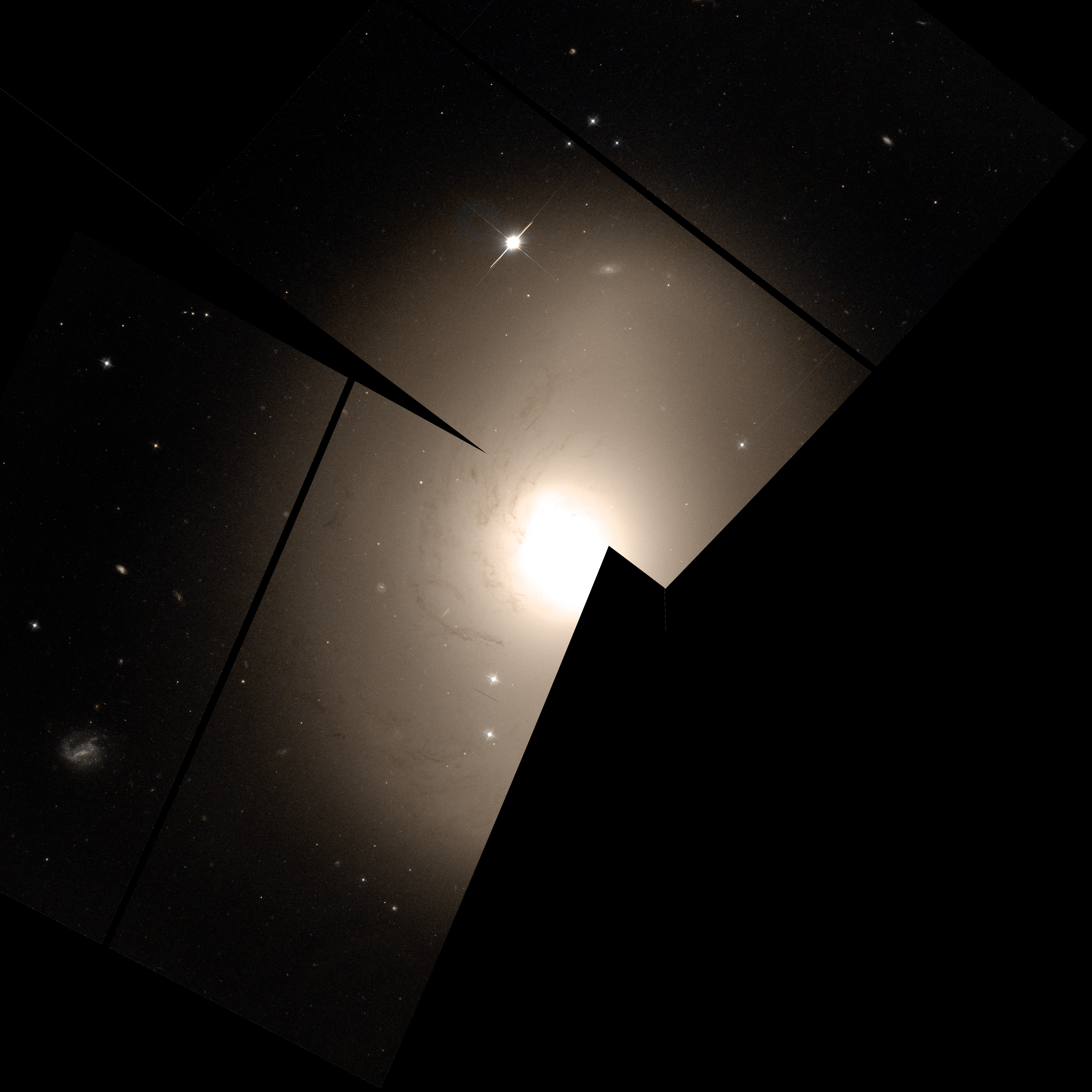
HST Mosaic

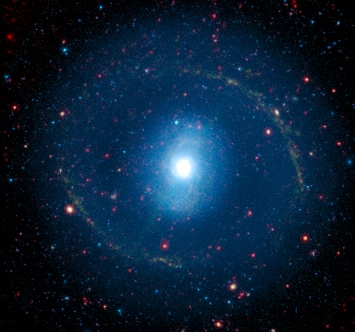
SST

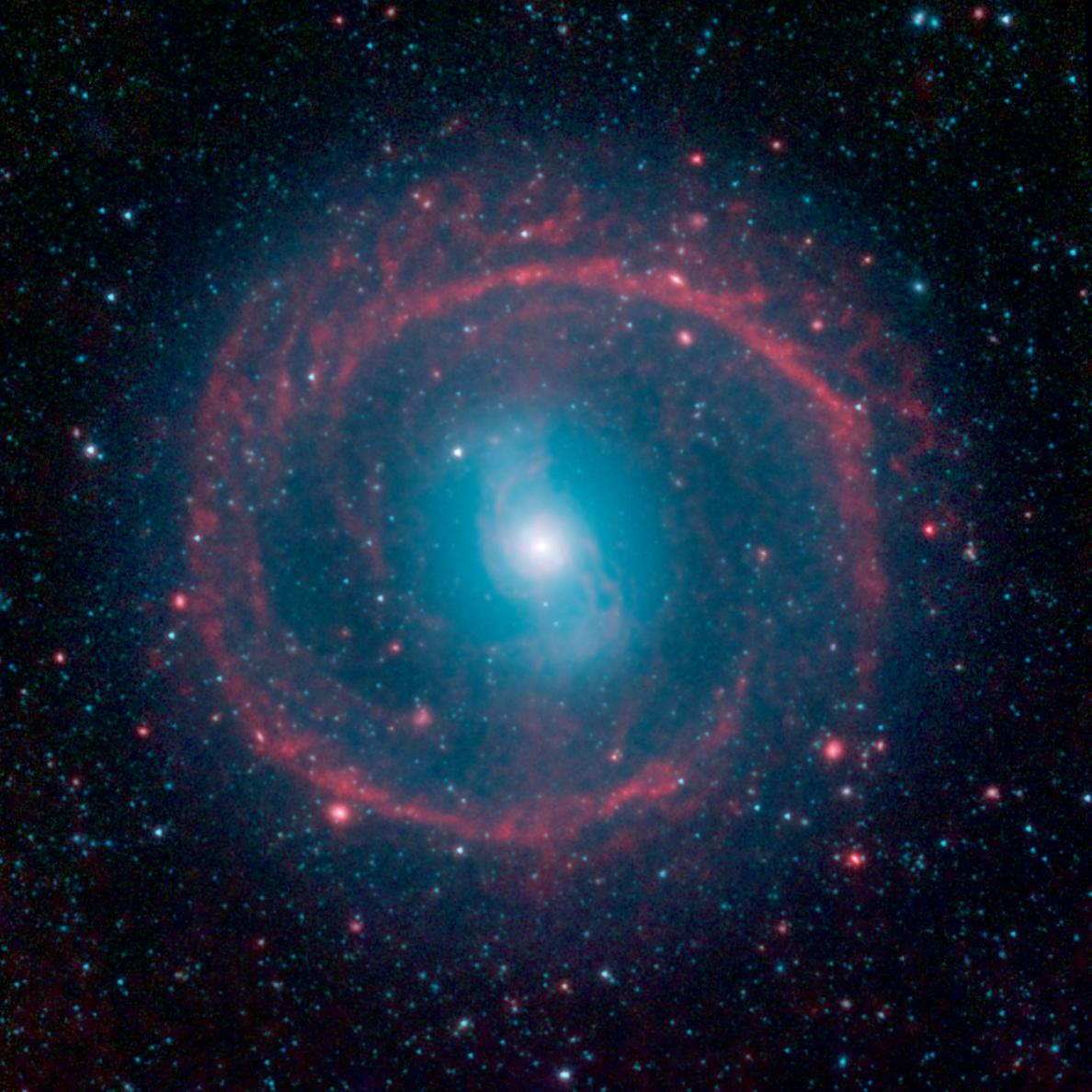
SST - IR

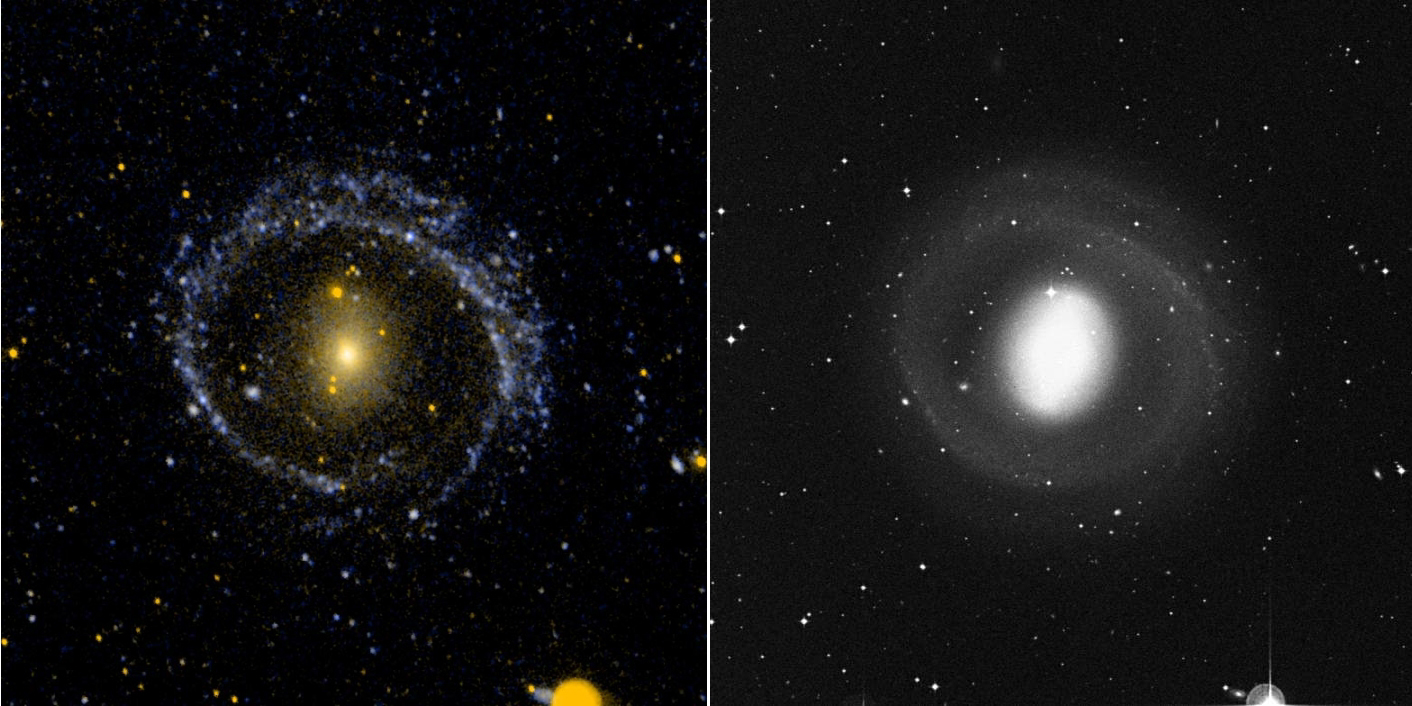
UV vs Visible
