= NGC 5064 =

Galaxy with unusual molecular clouds

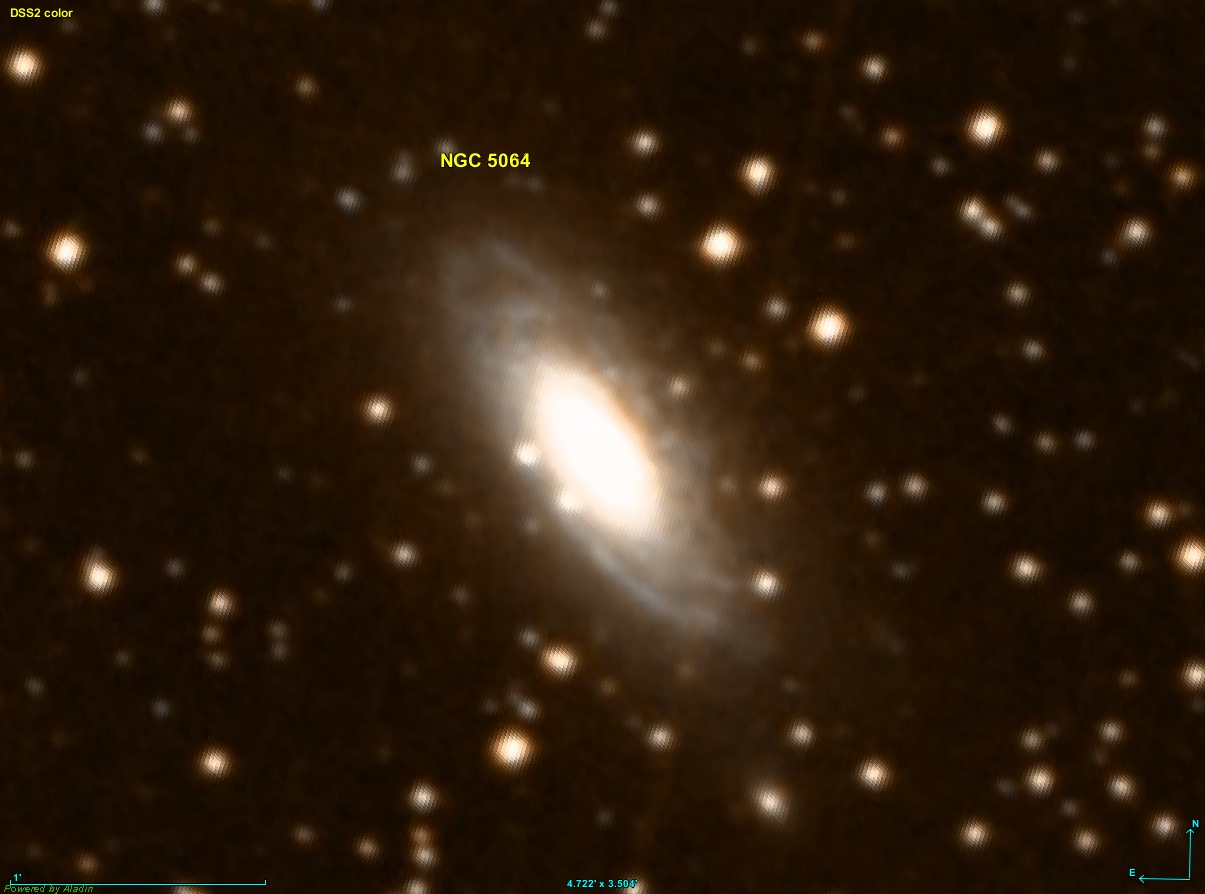
- Image of NGC 5064 created using the Aladin Sky Atlas software

Observation data (J2000 epoch)
- Constellation: Centaurus
- Right ascension: 13h 20m 31s
- Declination: -48° 02’ 33”
- Distance: 148 million ly
- Absolute magnitude (V): 11.61
- Absolute magnitude (B): 12.81
- magnitude (J): 9.09
- magnitude (H): 8.38
- magnitude (K): 8.01

Characteristics
- Type: Spiral
- Notable features: Large retrograde orbiting clouds of gas

Other designations
- GC 3480, h 348

NGC 5064 is a spiral galaxy located 45.5 mpc from Earth in the constellation of Centaurus. It is situated south of the celestial equator making it visible primarily in the southern hemisphere. The most notable features of NGC 5064 are its giant molecular clouds (GMCs) which exhibit a retrograde orbit around the galaxy. They gained their retrograde orbit through cloud-cloud collisions.

== Molecular clouds ==
The molecular clouds that are found within NGC 5064 are similar to those found in the Milky Way galaxy and other local group galaxies in terms of size (17-127 parsecs) mass (2.5x10^5- 3.2x10^7 solar masses) and velocity 1.2-17.9 km per second). Theses molecular clouds are giant compared to the galaxy taking up a significant fraction of its mass. What makes them more unusual is their retrograde orbit. They have strong gravitational force making them strongly bound which is supported by magnetic fields.
