= IC 4970 =

Lenticular galaxy in the constellation Pavo

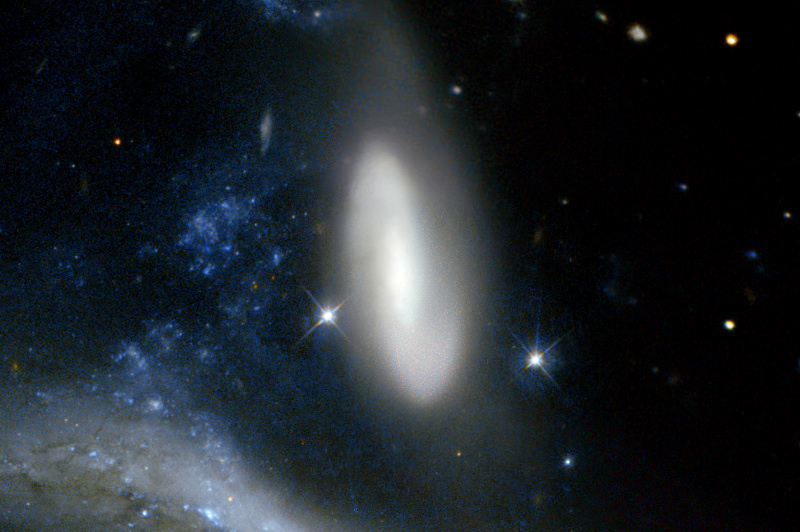
- Lenticular galaxy IC 4970

Observation data (J2000 epoch)
- Constellation: Pavo
- Right ascension: 20^{h} 16^{m} 57.35^{s}
- Declination: −70° 44′ 59.1″
- Redshift: 0.015728±0.000147
- Heliocentric radial velocity: 4715±44 km/s
- Galactocentric velocity: 4603±44 km/s
- Distance: 212×10^{6} ly (65 Mpc)
- Apparent magnitude (V): 13.06±0.09
- Absolute magnitude (V): −21.00±0.51

Characteristics
- Type: SA0^- pec:
- Size: 150,840 ly (46.27 kpc) (estimated)
- Apparent size (V): 0.7′× 0.2′
- Notable features: Interacting galaxy with NGC 6872

Other designations
- ESO 73-33, JB a 28-2, LEDA 64415, 2XMM J201657.3-704459

IC 4970 is an unbarred lenticular galaxy of type SA0^- pec: in the constellation Pavo. It is 212 million light-years (65 Mpc) from Earth and is interacting with the barred spiral galaxy NGC 6872. It was discovered on 21 September 1900 by American astronomer DeLisle Stewart.

== Interaction with NGC 6872 ==
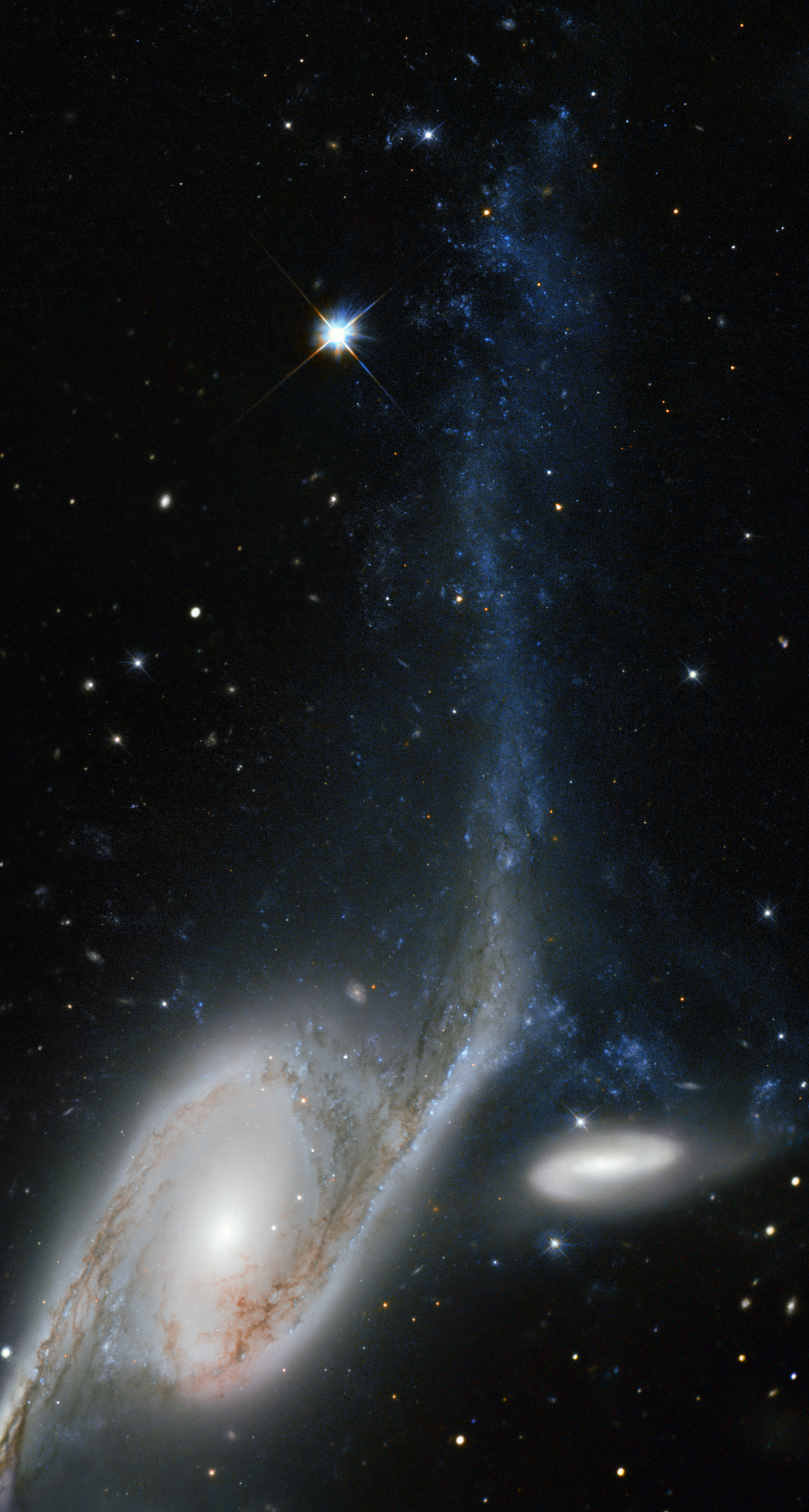
NGC 6872 and IC 4970

IC 4970 is located a few arcseconds away from the much larger barred spiral galaxy NGC 6872, and the two are known to be interacting with each other. Horrelou and Koribalski (2007) reported on a computer simulation used to determine how the two galaxies were interacting. The study concluded that IC 4970 approached NGC 6872 nearly along the plane of its spiral disk, making a closest approach approximately 130 million years ago resulting in the latter's current highly elongated shape.

An ultraviolet-to-infrared study by Eufrasio, et al. (2013), using data from GALEX, Spitzer, and other resources found that the interaction between the two galaxies appears to have triggered significant star formation in the northeastern arm of NGC 6872 beginning about 130 thousand light-years (40 kpc) from its nucleus. The same appears to have also occurred in the southwestern arm. A bright ultraviolet source was discovered at the end of the northeastern arm, around 290 thousand light-years (90 kpc) from the nucleus, which may be a tidal dwarf galaxy formed out of the interaction between IC 4970 and NGC 6872. The bright ultraviolet nature of this cluster indicates that it contains stars less than 200 million years old, which roughly coincides with the timeframe of the collision.
