= DeLisle Stewart =

American astronomer

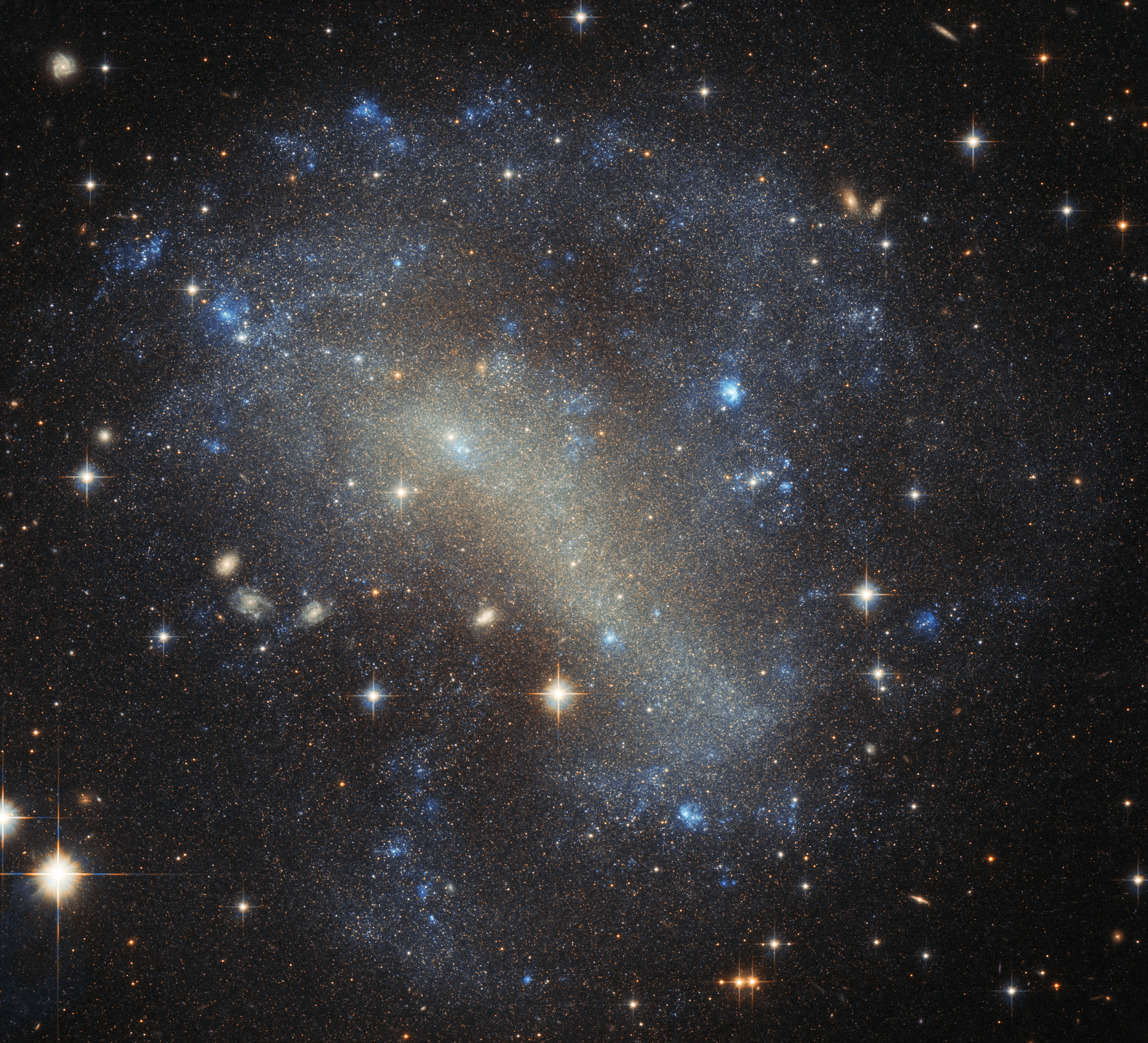
IC 4710, imaged by the NASA/ESA Hubble Space Telescope, was discovered by Stewart

Asteroids discovered: 1
475 Ocllo	August 14, 1901

DeLisle Stewart (March 16, 1870 – February 2, 1941) was an American astronomer. He is known for discovering a number of dwarf galaxies, asteroids, and nebulae, notably IC 4710 and IC 4070.

In 1896 he became a staff member of Harvard College Observatory, and from 1898 to 1901 he worked at that observatory's station at Arequipa, Peru, where he took the photographic plates that William Henry Pickering used to discover Saturn's moon, Phoebe.

Steward later worked at Cincinnati Observatory until 1910, later founding the Cincinnati Astronomical Society.

He discovered the asteroid 475 Ocllo.
