= NGC 1744 =

Galaxy in the constellation Lepus

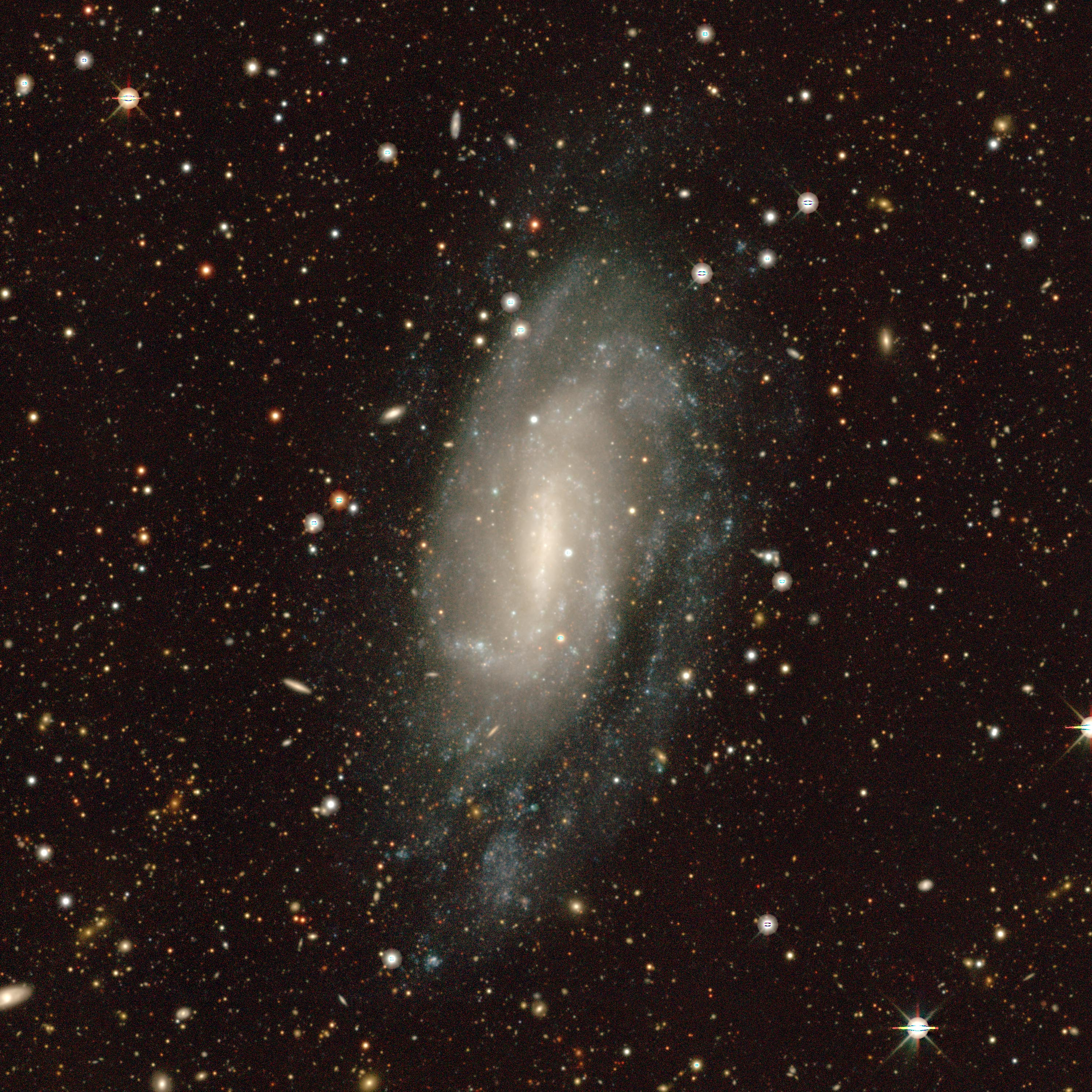
- NGC 1744 by Legacy Surveys

Observation data (J2000 epoch)
- Constellation: Lepus
- Right ascension: 04^{h} 59^{m} 57.736^{s}
- Declination: −26° 01′ 18.91″
- Redshift: 0.002472 ± 0.000002
- Heliocentric radial velocity: 741 ± 1 km/s
- Distance: 32.6 ± 5.3 Mly (10.0 ± 1.6 Mpc)
- Apparent magnitude (V): 11.1

Characteristics
- Type: SB(s)d
- Size: ~77,000 ly (23.5 kpc) (estimated)
- Apparent size (V): 8.1′ × 4.4′

Other designations
- ESO 486- G 005, IRAS 04579-2605, MCG -04-12-029, PGC 16517

NGC 1744 is a barred spiral galaxy in the constellation Lepus. The galaxy lies about 30 million light years away from Earth based on redshift independent methods, which means, given its apparent dimensions, that NGC 1744 is approximately 75,000 light years across. It was discovered by John Herschel on November 20, 1835.

== Characteristics ==
NGC 1744 has a narrow bright bar with many knots measuring 1.3 by 0.3 arcminutes across. The spiral arm pattern is asymmetric. The arms have many star forming regions visible in H-alpha. The north and west arms host many HII regions, while the short southeastern arm has a single giant one. Star forming regions are visible along the faint and diffuse arm running from north of the bar southwards. The galaxy is seen with an inclination of 70°.

The appearance of the galaxy in ultraviolet is similar, with open arms and star forming regions. Hydrogen line emission is diffuse, with no discernible spiral pattern although there are some clumps at the locations of large star forming regions, and appears undisturbed. The total hydrogen mass of the galaxy is estimated to be (7.6±0.2)×10^{9} M_{☉}, with no hydrogen emission outside the plane of the disk.

The galaxy has a steep metallicity gradient, probably caused by the presence of the bar, and enhanced star formation there. The total star formation rate is estimated to be 0.15 M_{☉} per year.

In the nucleus lies a nuclear star cluster which is 3.3 arcseconds across.

== Nearby galaxies ==
NGC 1744 forms a non interacting pair with ESO 486-G021, which lies 58 arcminutes away, which at the distance of NGC 1744 corresponds to a projected distance about 200 kpc (650,000 light years). NGC 1744 has been considered a member of the LGG 127 Group, which also includes NGC 1792 and NGC 1808.

== Gallery ==
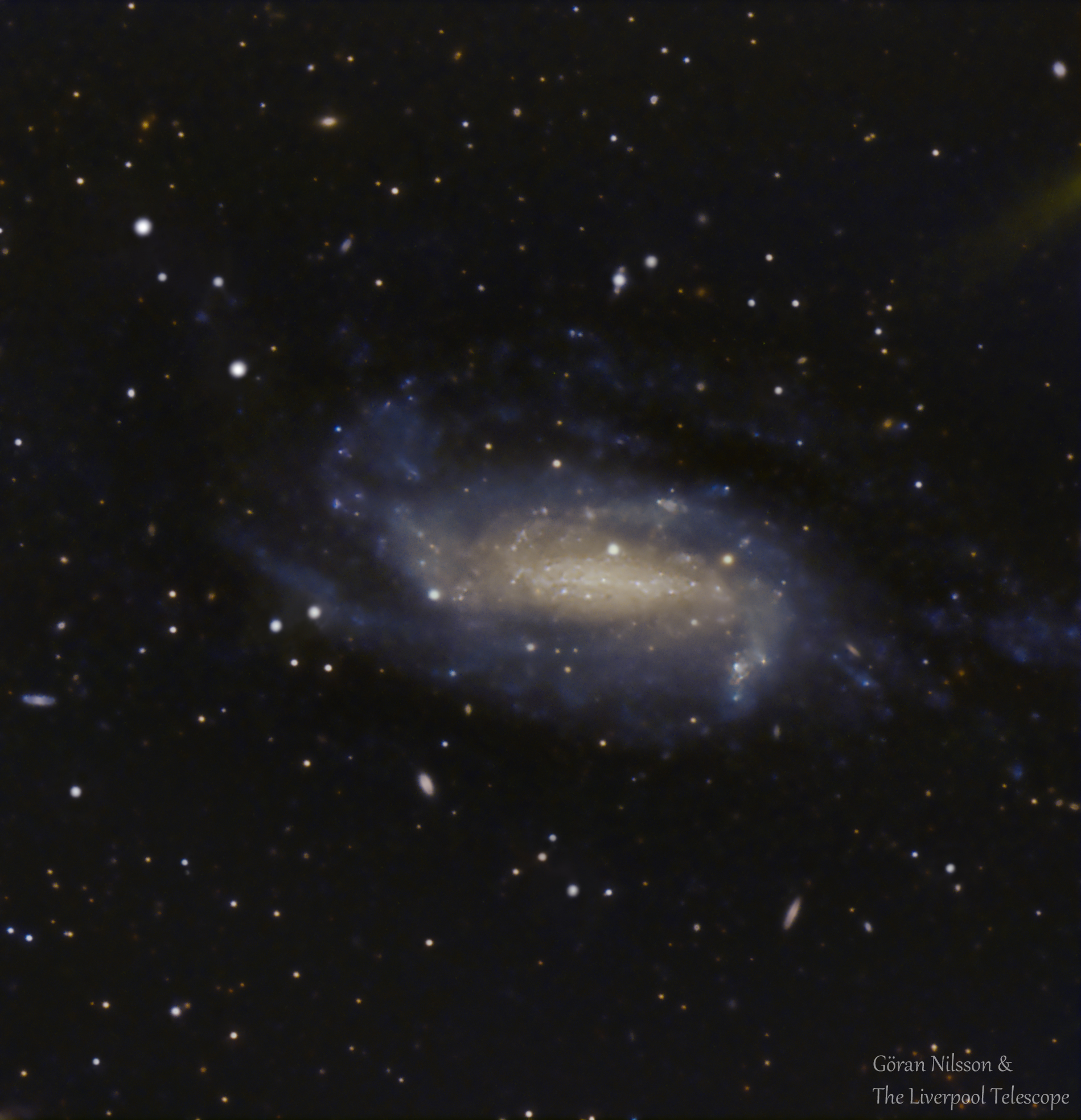
NGC 1744 by the Liverpool Telescope

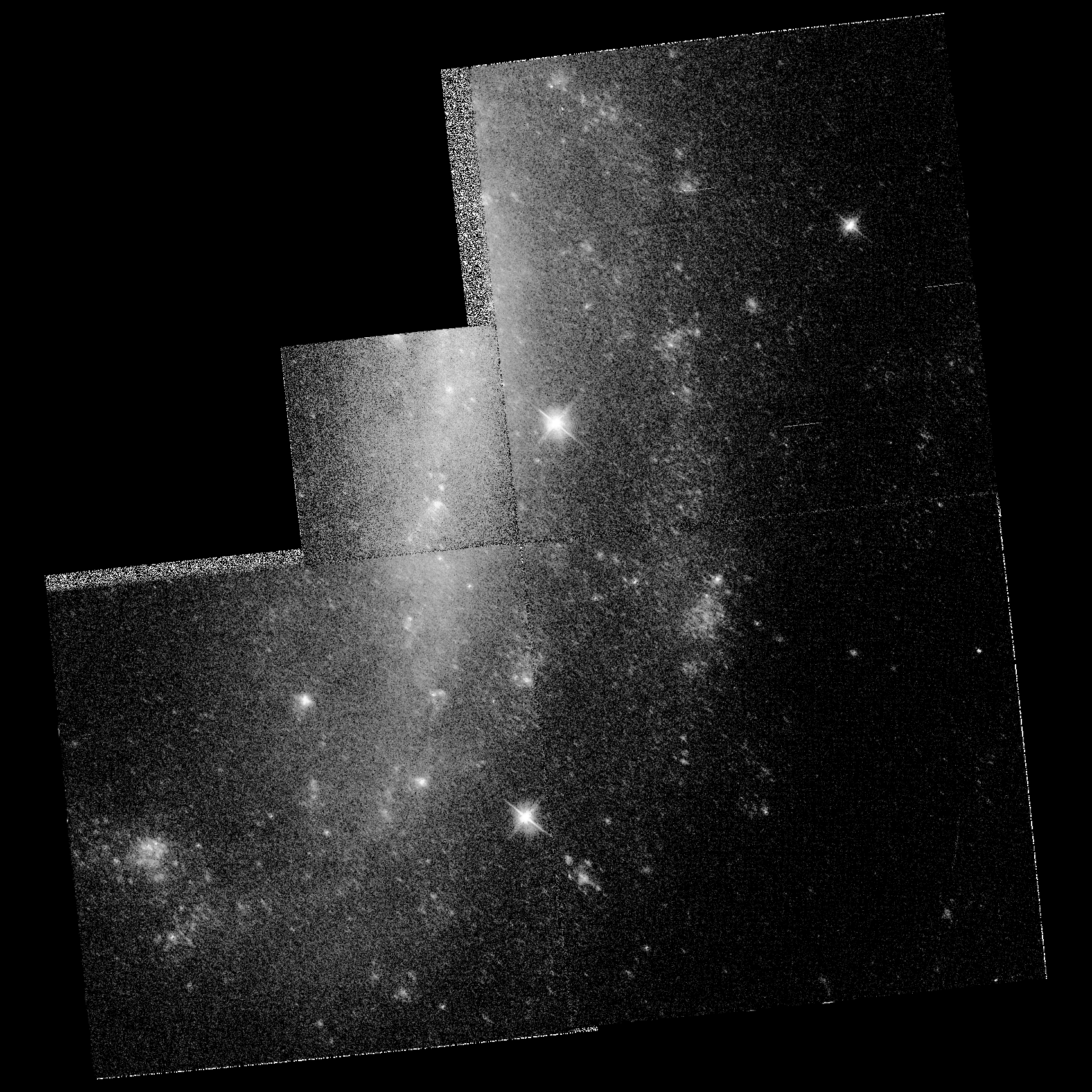
NGC 1744 by the Hubble Space Telescope

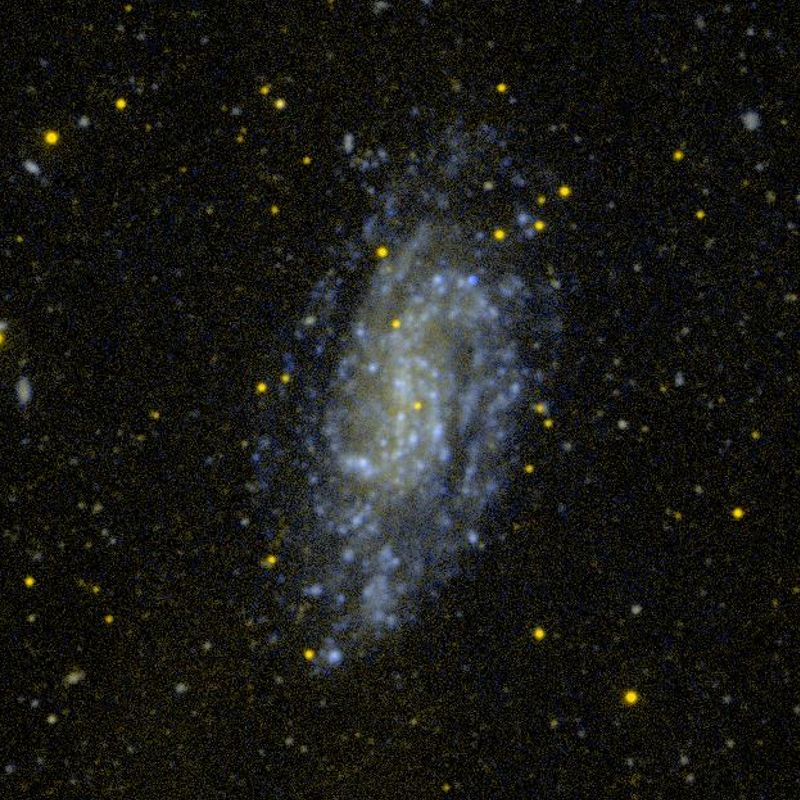
NGC 1744 in ultraviolet by GALEX
