= NGC 1827 =

Galaxy in the constellation Columba

- NGC 1827 imaged by the Hubble Space Telescope

Observation data (J2000 epoch)
- Constellation: Columba
- Right ascension: 05^{h} 10^{m} 04.5297^{s}
- Declination: −36° 57′ 36.640″
- Redshift: 0.003459±0.00000500
- Heliocentric radial velocity: 1,037±1 km/s
- Distance: 37.44 ± 1.97 Mly (11.480 ± 0.604 Mpc)
- Group or cluster: NGC 1808 group (LGG 127)
- Apparent magnitude (V): 13.24

Characteristics
- Type: SAB(s)cd? edge-on
- Size: ~46,700 ly (14.31 kpc) (estimated)
- Apparent size (V): 3.0′ × 0.7′

Other designations
- ESO 362- G 006, IRAS 05083-3701, 2MASX J05100458-3657368, MCG -06-12-008, PGC 016849

NGC 1827 is an edge-on intermediate spiral galaxy in the constellation of Columba. Its velocity with respect to the cosmic microwave background is 1,062±2 km/s, which corresponds to a Hubble distance of 51.1 ± 3.6 Mly (15.66 ± 1.10 Mpc). However, five non-redshift measurements give a closer mean distance of 37.44 ± 1.97 Mly (11.480 ± 0.604 Mpc). It was discovered by British astronomer John Herschel on 28 November 1837.

NGC 1827 has a possible active galactic nucleus, i.e. it has a compact region at the center of a galaxy that emits a significant amount of energy across the electromagnetic spectrum, with characteristics indicating that this luminosity is not produced by the stars.

== NGC 1808 group ==
NGC 1827 is member of the NGC 1808 galaxy group (also known as LGG 127). This group contains 14 galaxies, including NGC 1792, NGC 1808, ESO 305-9, ESO 305-17, ESO 362-11, and ESO 362-19.

== See also ==
- List of NGC objects (1001–2000)
