= Seyfert galaxy =

Class of active galaxies with very bright nuclei

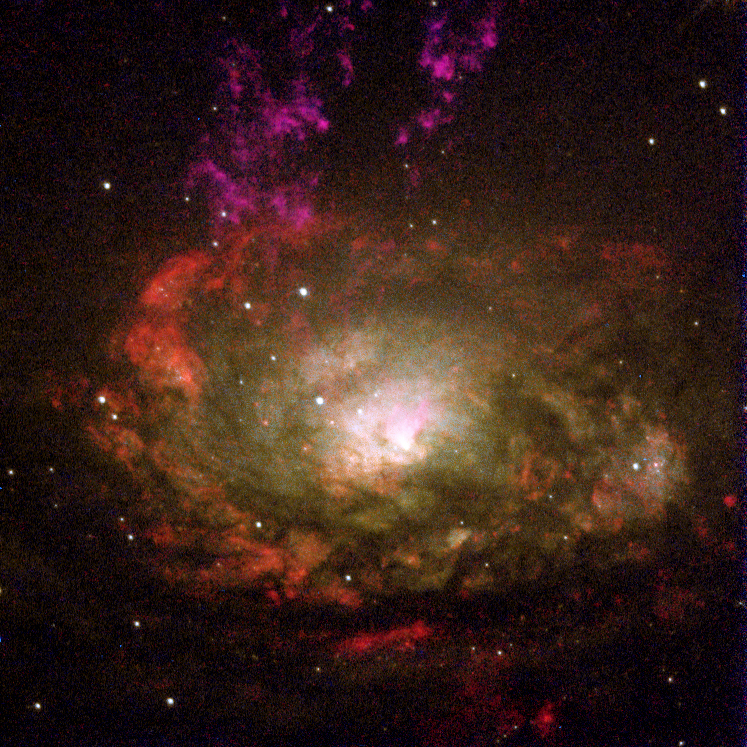
The Circinus Galaxy, a Type II Seyfert galaxy

Seyfert galaxies are one of the two largest groups of active galaxies, along with quasar host galaxies. They have quasar-like nuclei (very luminous sources of electromagnetic radiation that are outside of our own galaxy) with very high surface brightnesses whose spectra reveal strong, high-ionisation emission lines. However, unlike quasars, their host galaxies are clearly detectable.

Seyfert galaxies account for about 10% of all galaxies and are some of the most intensely studied objects in astronomy, as they are thought to be powered by the same phenomena that occur in quasars, although they are closer and less luminous than quasars. These galaxies have supermassive black holes at their centers which are surrounded by accretion discs of in-falling material. The accretion discs are believed to be the source of the observed ultraviolet radiation. Ultraviolet emission and absorption lines provide the best diagnostics for the composition of the surrounding material.

Seen in visible light, most Seyfert galaxies look like normal spiral galaxies, but when studied under other wavelengths, it becomes clear that the luminosity of their cores is of comparable intensity to the luminosity of whole galaxies the size of the Milky Way.

Seyfert galaxies are named after Carl Seyfert, who first described this class in 1943.

== Discovery ==
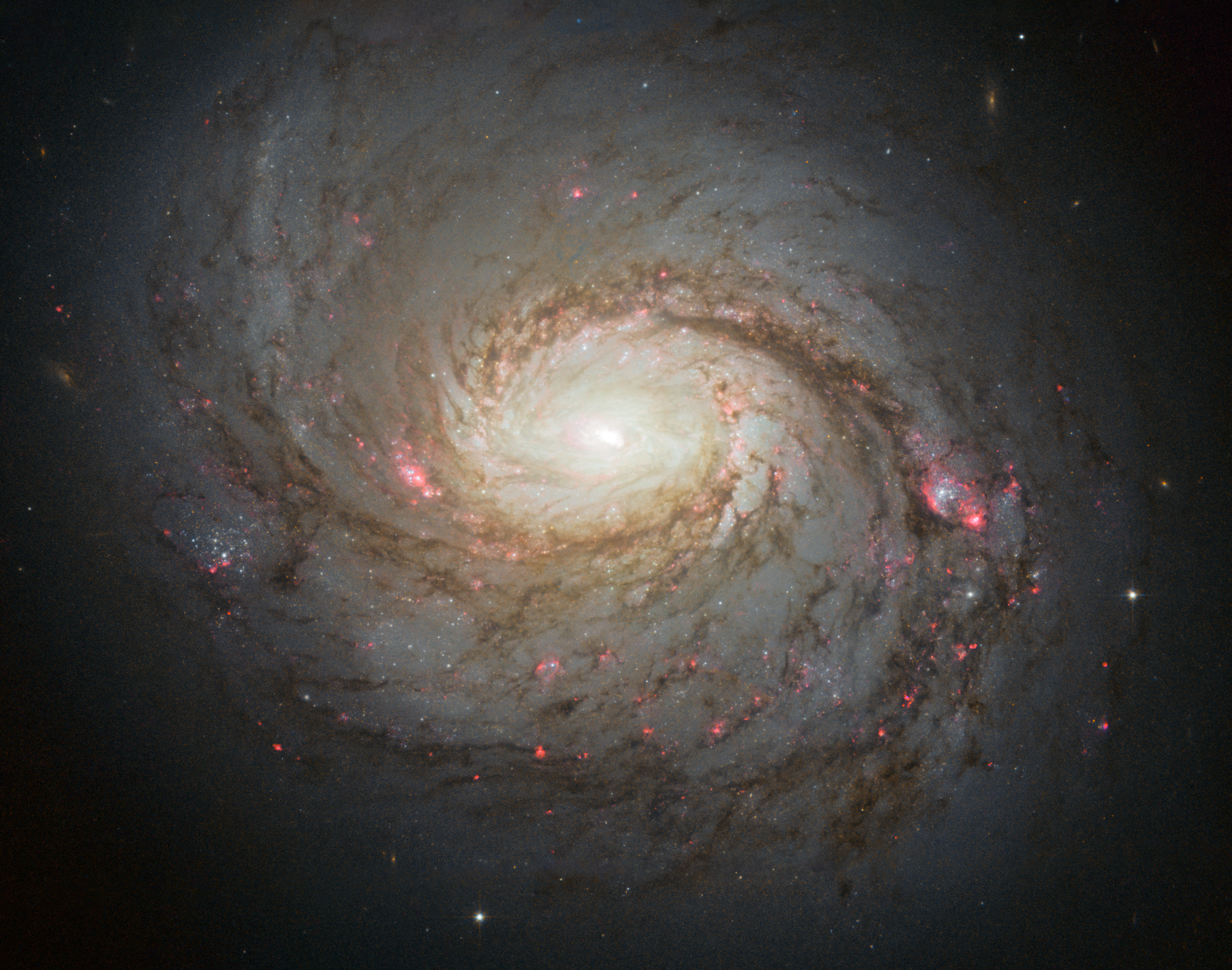
NGC 1068 (Messier 77), one of the first Seyfert galaxies classified

Seyfert galaxies were first detected in 1908 by Edward A. Fath and Vesto Slipher, who were using the Lick Observatory to look at the spectra of astronomical objects that were thought to be "spiral nebulae". They noticed that NGC 1068 showed six bright emission lines, which was considered unusual as most objects observed showed an absorption spectrum corresponding to stars.

In 1926, Edwin Hubble looked at the emission lines of NGC 1068 and two other such "nebulae" and classified them as extragalactic objects. In 1943, Carl Keenan Seyfert discovered more galaxies similar to NGC 1068 and reported that these galaxies have very bright stellar-like nuclei that produce broad emission lines. In 1944 Cygnus A was detected at 160 MHz, and detection was confirmed in 1948 when it was established that it was a discrete source. Its double radio structure became apparent with the use of interferometry. In the next few years, other radio sources such as supernova remnants were discovered. By the end of the 1950s, more important characteristics of Seyfert galaxies were discovered, including the fact that their nuclei are extremely compact (< 100 pc, i.e. "unresolved"), have high mass (≈10^{9±1} solar masses), and the duration of peak nuclear emissions is relatively short (> 10^{8} years).

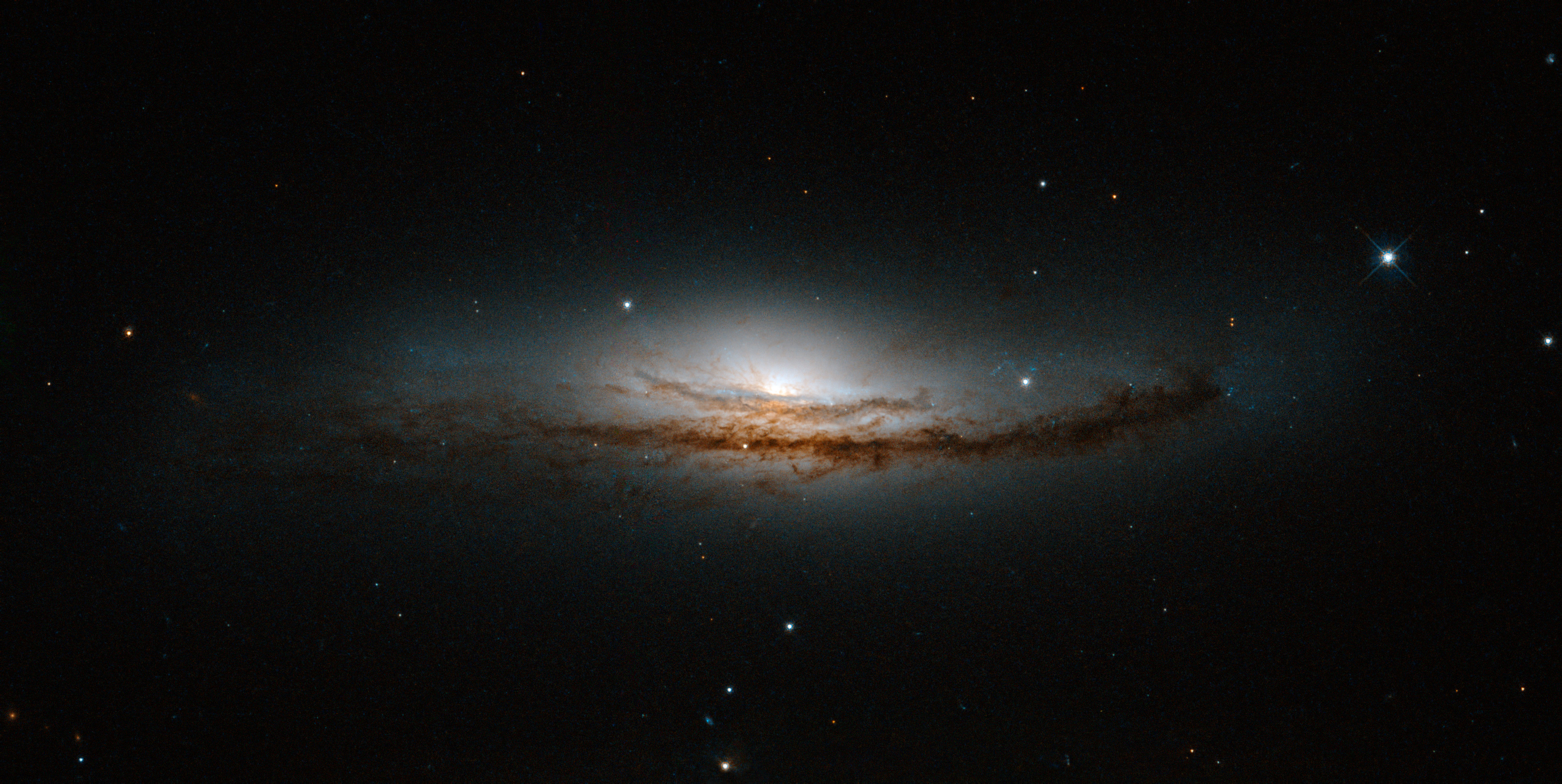
NGC 5793 is a Seyfert galaxy located over 150 million light-years away in the constellation of Libra.

In the 1960s and 1970s, research to further understand the properties of Seyfert galaxies was carried out. A few direct measurements of the actual sizes of Seyfert nuclei were taken, and it was established that the emission lines in NGC 1068 were produced in a region over a thousand light years in diameter. Controversy existed over whether Seyfert redshifts were of cosmological origin. Confirming estimates of the distance to Seyfert galaxies and their age were limited since their nuclei vary in brightness over a time scale of a few years; therefore arguments involving distance to such galaxies and the constant speed of light cannot always be used to determine their age. In the same time period, research had been undertaken to survey, identify and catalogue galaxies, including Seyferts. Beginning in 1967, Benjamin Markarian published lists containing a few hundred galaxies distinguished by their very strong ultraviolet emission, with measurements on the position of some of them being improved in 1973 by other researchers. At the time, it was believed that 1% of spiral galaxies are Seyferts. By 1977, it was found that very few Seyfert galaxies are ellipticals, most of them being spiral or barred spiral galaxies.

During the same time period, efforts have been made to gather spectrophotometric data for Seyfert galaxies. It became obvious that not all spectra from Seyfert galaxies look the same, so they have been subclassified according to the characteristics of their emission spectra. A simple division into types I and II has been devised, with the classes depending on the relative width of their emission lines. It has been later noticed that some Seyfert nuclei show intermediate properties, resulting in their being further subclassified into types 1.2, 1.5, 1.8 and 1.9 (see #Classification). Early surveys for Seyfert galaxies were biased in counting only the brightest representatives of this group. More recent surveys that count galaxies with low-luminosity and obscured Seyfert nuclei suggest that the Seyfert phenomenon is actually quite common, occurring in 16% ± 5% of galaxies; indeed, several dozen galaxies exhibiting the Seyfert phenomenon exist in the close vicinity (≈27 Mpc) of our own galaxy. Seyfert galaxies form a substantial fraction of the galaxies appearing in the Markarian Catalogue, a list of galaxies displaying an ultraviolet excess in their nuclei.

From 1975 to 1979, Susan Simkin conducted a photographic survey of nearby (z < 0.017) Seyfert galaxies on the UK and Palomar Schmidt telescopes, which led to better understanding of their morphologies. With Su Hongjun and Mark Philip Schwarz, they found a correlation between the Seyferts' spiral gas structure and the orbital resonances of their nuclear bars, confirming earlier simulations of AGN feedback.

== Characteristics ==
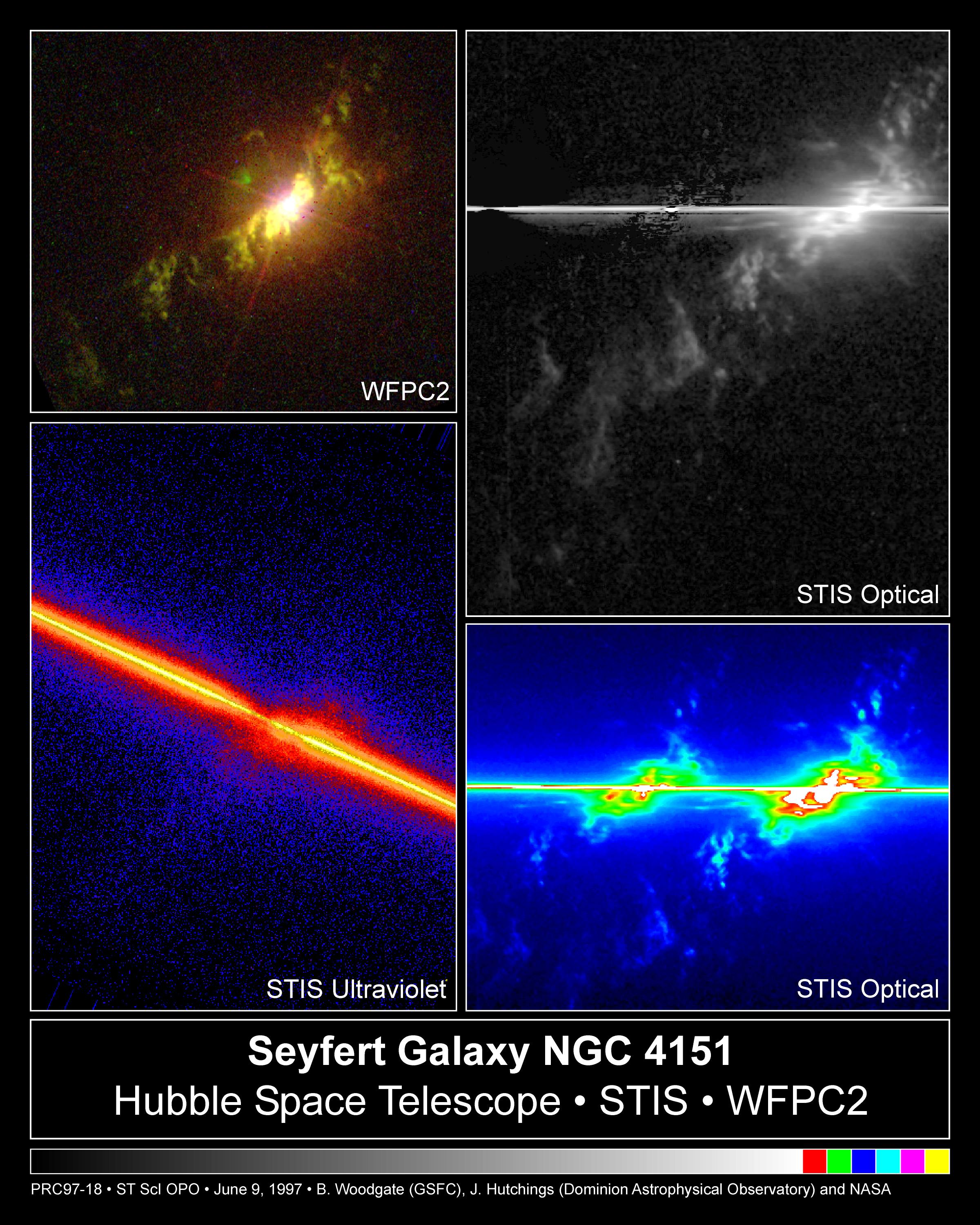
Optical and ultraviolet images of the black hole in the center of NGC 4151, a Seyfert galaxy

An active galactic nucleus (AGN) is a compact region at the center of a galaxy that has a higher than normal luminosity over portions of the electromagnetic spectrum. A galaxy having an active nucleus is called an active galaxy. Active galactic nuclei are the most luminous sources of electromagnetic radiation in the Universe, and their evolution puts constraints on cosmological models. Depending on the type, their luminosity varies over a timescale from a few hours to a few years. The two largest subclasses of active galaxies are quasars and Seyfert galaxies, the main difference between the two being the amount of radiation they emit. In a typical Seyfert galaxy, the nuclear source emits at visible wavelengths an amount of radiation comparable to that of the whole galaxy's constituent stars, while in a quasar, the nuclear source is brighter than the constituent stars by at least a factor of 100. Seyfert galaxies have extremely bright nuclei, with luminosities ranging between 10^{8} and 10^{11} solar luminosities. Only about 5% of them are radio bright; their emissions are moderate in gamma rays and bright in X-rays. Their visible and infrared spectra show very bright emission lines of hydrogen, helium, nitrogen, and oxygen. These emission lines exhibit strong Doppler broadening, which implies velocities from 500 to 4,000 km/s (310 to 2,490 mi/s), and are believed to originate near an accretion disc surrounding the central black hole.

=== Eddington luminosity ===
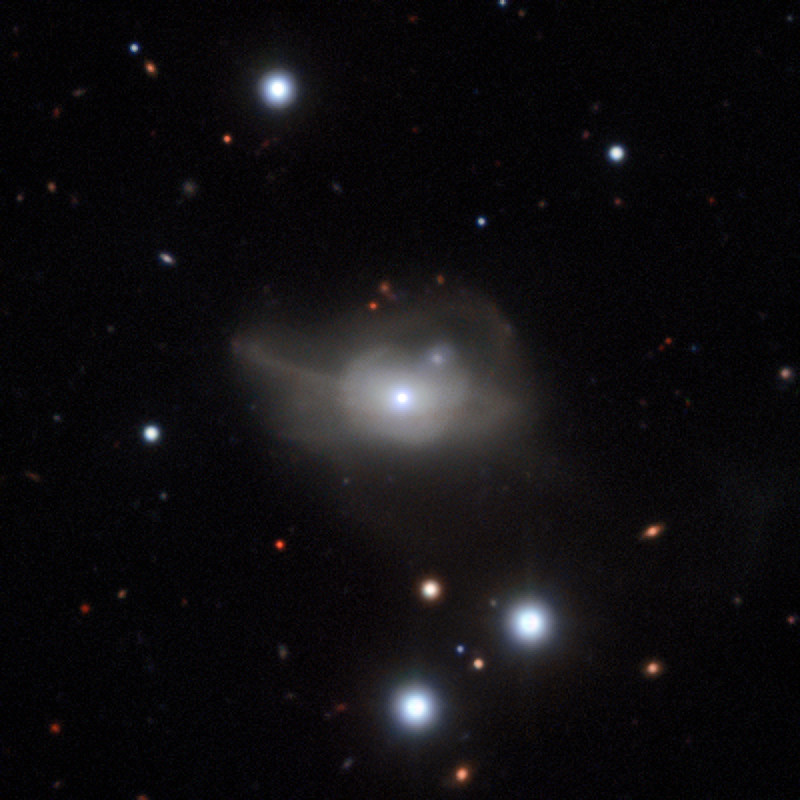
Active galaxy Markarian 1018 has a supermassive black hole at its core.

A lower limit to the mass of the central black hole can be calculated using the Eddington luminosity. This limit arises because light exhibits radiation pressure. Assume that a black hole is surrounded by a disc of luminous gas. Both the attractive gravitational force acting on electron-ion pairs in the disc and the repulsive force exerted by radiation pressure follow an inverse-square law. If the gravitational force exerted by the black hole is less than the repulsive force due to radiation pressure, the disc will be blown away by radiation pressure. (Note: The gravitational force F_{grav} of the black hole can be calculated using: $$F_\text{grav}=\frac{GM_{\textrm{BH}}m_p}{r^2}$$ where G is the gravitational constant, m_{p} is the proton mass and M_{BH}, r are the mass and radius of the black hole, respectively. We derive the outward radiative force F_{rad} as we do for stars assuming spherical symmetry: $$F_{\textrm{rad}} =\frac{dp}{dt}=\frac{1}{c}\frac{dE}{dt} = \frac{1}{c}\sigma_t\frac{L}{4\pi r^2}$$ where p is momentum, t is time, c is the speed of light, E is energy, σ_{t} is the Thomson cross-section and L is luminosity. The luminosity of the black hole must be less than the Eddington luminosity L_{Edd}, i.e., $$L < L_{\textrm{Edd}}$$ which is given when: $$\begin{align} F_{\textrm{rad}} &= F_{\textrm{grav}}  \\ L &= \frac{4\pi r^2 c}{\sigma_t} F_\text{rad} = \frac{4\pi r^2 c}{\sigma_t} F_\text{grav}\\ &= \frac{4\pi r^2 c}{\sigma_t} \cdot \frac{G M_\text{BH} m_p}{r^2} \\ &= \frac{4\pi c G M_{\textrm{BH}} m_p}{\sigma_t} \\ &= 1.3 \times 10^{38} \frac{M_\textrm{BH}}{M_\odot} \, \mathrm{erg/s} \\ &=  30000 \frac{M_{\textrm{BH}}}{M_\odot} L_\odot \end{align}$$ where M_{☉} is the mass of the Sun and L_{☉} is the solar luminosity. Therefore, given the observed luminosity (which would be less than the Eddington luminosity), an approximate lower limit for the mass of the central black hole at the center of an active galaxy can be estimated. This derivation is a widely used approximation, but when the actual geometry of accretion discs is taken into account, it is found that the results can differ considerably from the classical value.)

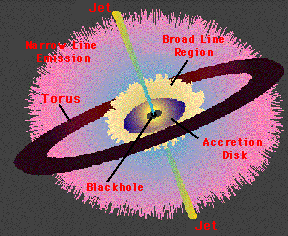
A model of an active galactic nucleus. The central black hole is surrounded by an accretion disc, which is surrounded by a torus. The broad-line region and narrow-line-emission region are shown, as well as jets coming out of the nucleus.

=== Emissions ===
The emission lines seen on the spectrum of a Seyfert galaxy may come from the surface of the accretion disc itself, or may come from clouds of gas illuminated by the central engine in an ionization cone. The exact geometry of the emitting region is difficult to determine due to poor resolution of the galactic center. However, each part of the accretion disc has a different velocity relative to our line of sight, and the faster the gas is rotating around the black hole, the broader the emission line will be. Similarly, an illuminated disc wind also has a position-dependent velocity.

The narrow lines are believed to originate from the outer part of the active galactic nucleus, where velocities are lower, while the broad lines originate closer to the black hole. This is confirmed by the fact that the narrow lines do not vary detectably, which implies that the emitting region is large, contrary to the broad lines which can vary on relatively short timescales. Reverberation mapping is a technique which uses this variability to try to determine the location and morphology of the emitting region. This technique measures the structure and kinematics of the broad line emitting region by observing the changes in the emitted lines as a response to changes in the continuum. The use of reverberation mapping requires the assumption that the continuum originates in a single central source. For 35 AGN, reverberation mapping has been used to calculate the mass of the central black holes and the size of the broad line regions.

In the few radio-loud Seyfert galaxies that have been observed, the radio emission is believed to represent synchrotron emission from the jet. The infrared emission is due to radiation in other bands being reprocessed by dust near the nucleus. The highest energy photons are believed to be created by inverse Compton scattering by a high-temperature corona near the black hole.

== Classification ==
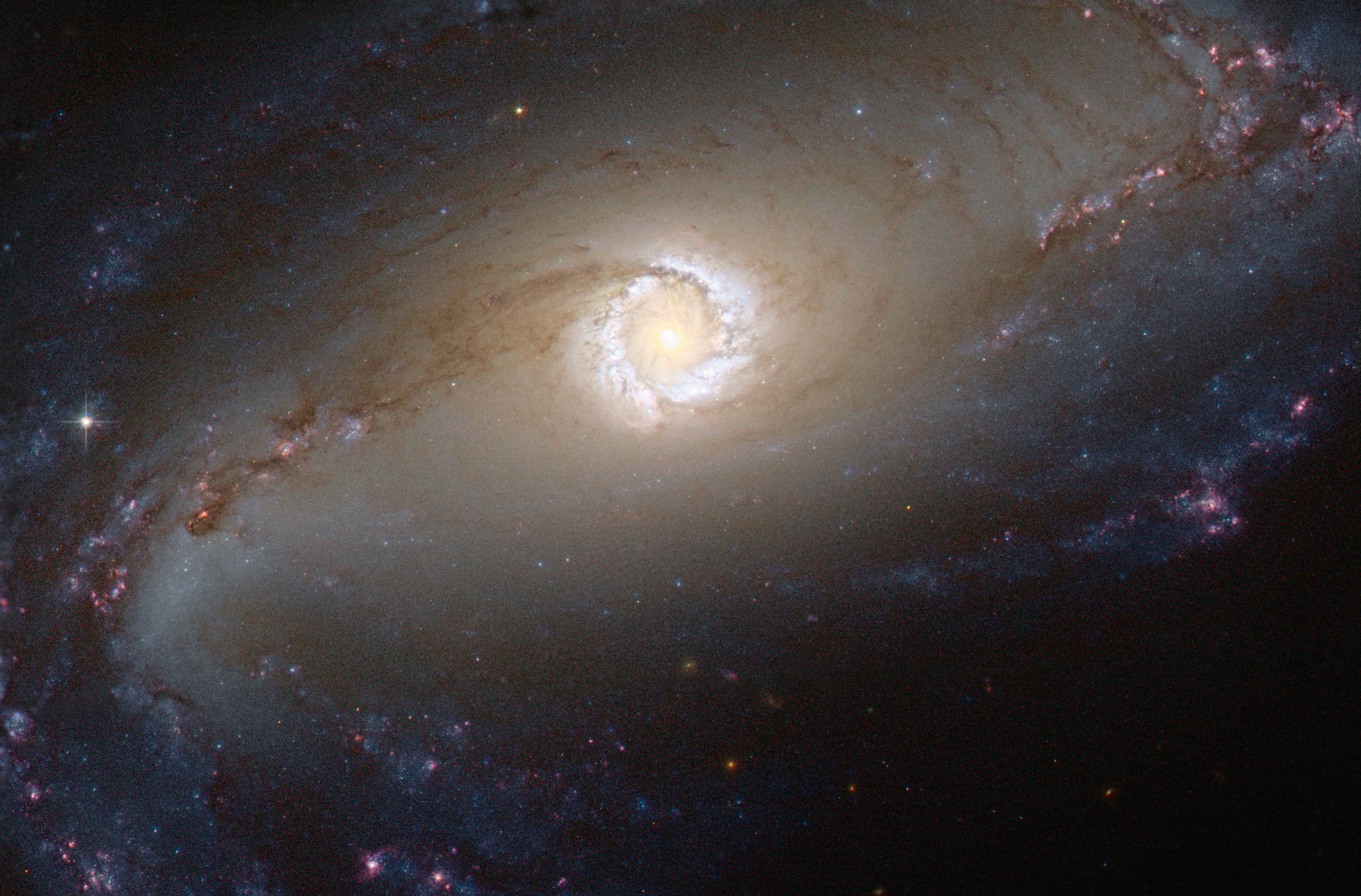
NGC 1097 is an example of a Seyfert galaxy. A supermassive black hole with a mass of 100 million solar masses lies at the center of the galaxy. The area around the black hole emits large amounts of radiation from the matter falling into the black hole.

Seyferts were first classified as Type I or II, depending on the emission lines shown by their spectra. The spectra of Type I Seyfert galaxies show broad lines that include both allowed lines, like H I, He I or He II and narrower forbidden lines, like O III. They show some narrower allowed lines as well, but even these narrow lines are much broader than the lines shown by normal galaxies. However, the spectra of Type II Seyfert galaxies show only narrow lines, both permitted and forbidden. Forbidden lines are spectral lines that occur due to electron transitions not normally allowed by the selection rules of quantum mechanics, but that still have a small probability of spontaneously occurring. The term "forbidden" is slightly misleading, as the electron transitions causing them are not forbidden but highly improbable.

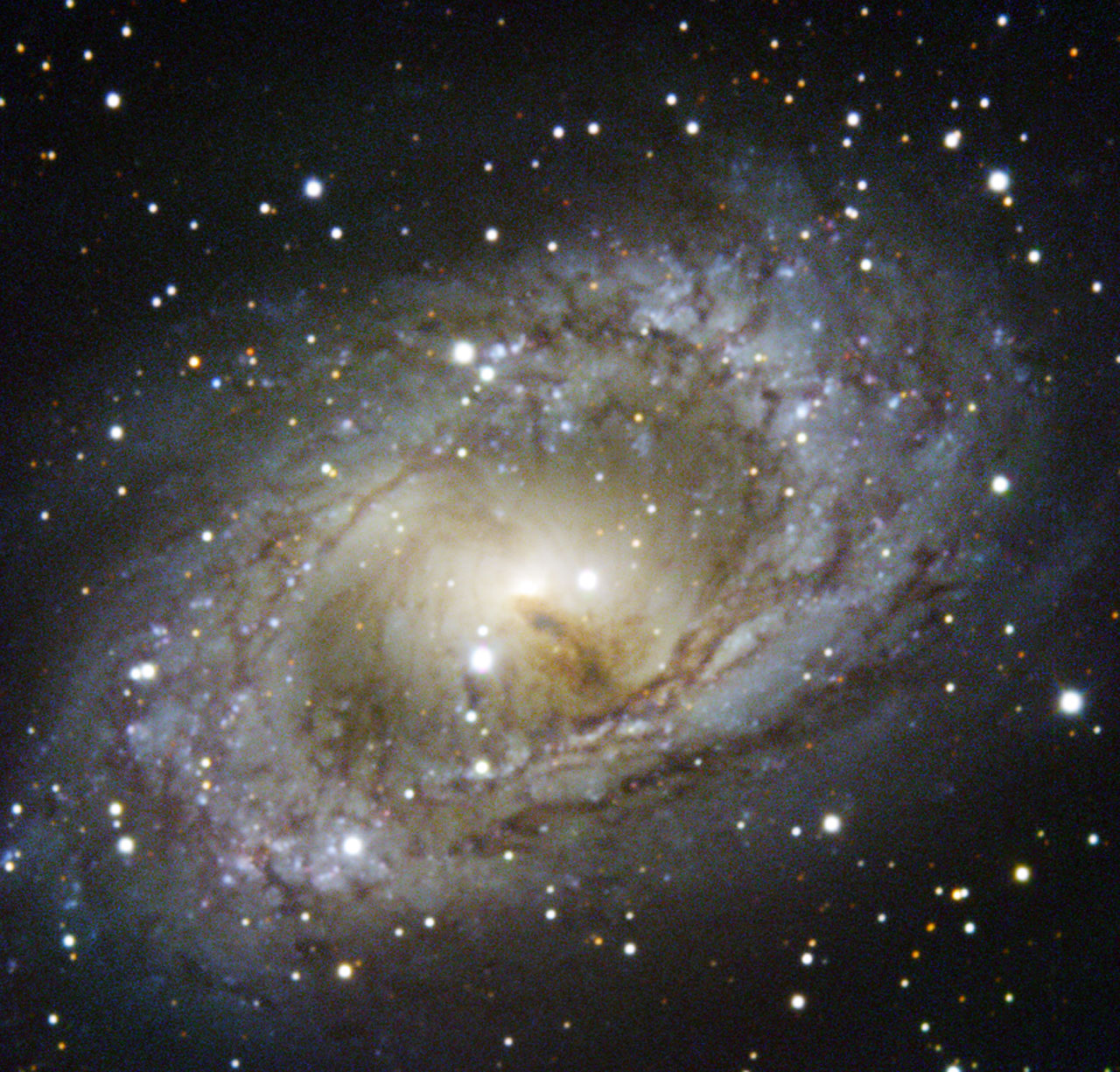
NGC 6300 is a Type II galaxy in the southern constellation of Ara.

In some cases, the spectra show both broad and narrow permitted lines, which is why they are classified as an intermediate type between Type I and Type II, such as Type 1.5 Seyfert. The spectra of some of these galaxies have changed from Type 1.5 to Type II in a matter of a few years. However, the characteristic broad Hα emission line has rarely, if ever, disappeared. The origin of the differences between Type I and Type II Seyfert galaxies is not known yet. There are a few cases where galaxies have been identified as Type II only because the broad components of the spectral lines have been very hard to detect. It is believed by some that all Type II Seyferts are in fact Type I, where the broad components of the lines are impossible to detect because of the angle we are at with respect to the galaxy. Specifically, in Type I Seyfert galaxies, we observe the central compact source more or less directly, therefore sampling the high-velocity clouds in the broad line emission region moving around the supermassive black hole thought to be at the center of the galaxy. By contrast, in Type II Seyfert galaxies, the active nuclei are obscured and only the colder outer regions located further away from the clouds' broad line emission region are seen. This theory is known as the "Unification scheme" of Seyfert galaxies. However, it is not yet clear if this hypothesis can explain all the observed differences between the two types.

=== Type I Seyfert galaxies ===
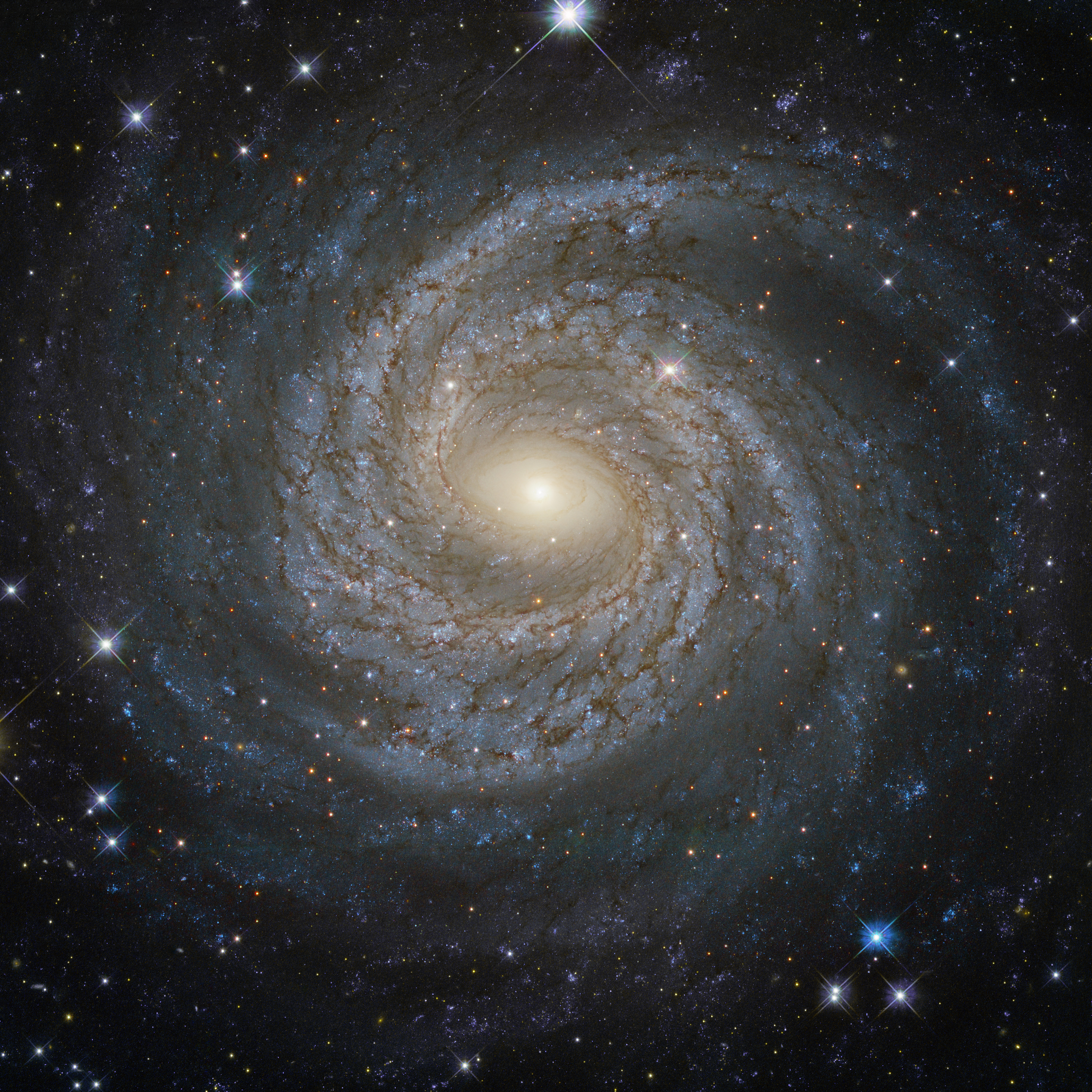
NGC 6814 is a Seyfert galaxy with a highly variable source of X-ray radiation.

Type I Seyferts are very bright sources of ultraviolet light and X-rays in addition to the visible light coming from their cores. They have two sets of emission lines on their spectra: narrow lines with widths (measured in velocity units) of several hundred km/s, and broad lines with widths up to 10^{4} km/s. The broad lines originate above the accretion disc of the supermassive black hole thought to power the galaxy, while the narrow lines occur beyond the broad line region of the accretion disc. Both emissions are caused by heavily ionised gas. The broad line emission arises in a region 0.1–1 parsec across. The broad line emission region, R_{BLR}, can be estimated from the time delay corresponding to the time taken by light to travel from the continuum source to the line-emitting gas.

=== Type II Seyfert galaxies ===
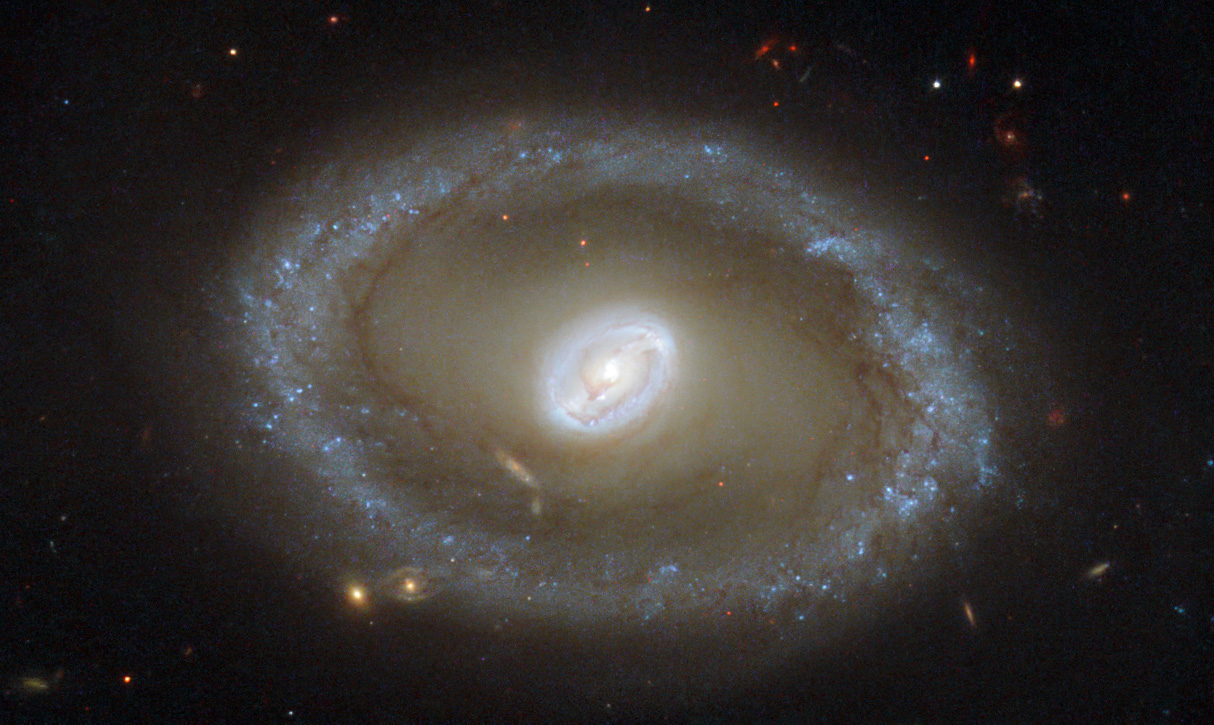
NGC 3081 is known as a Type II Seyfert galaxy, characterised by its dazzling nucleus.

Type II Seyfert galaxies have the characteristic bright core, as well as appearing bright when viewed at infrared wavelengths. Their spectra contain narrow lines associated with forbidden transitions, and broader lines associated with allowed strong dipole or intercombination transitions. NGC 3147 is considered the best candidate to be a true Type II Seyfert galaxy. In some Type II Seyfert galaxies, analysis with a technique called spectro-polarimetry (spectroscopy of polarised light component) revealed obscured Type I regions. In the case of NGC 1068, nuclear light reflected off a dust cloud was measured, which led scientists to believe in the presence of an obscuring dust torus around a bright continuum and broad emission line nucleus. When the galaxy is viewed from the side, the nucleus is indirectly observed through reflection by gas and dust above and below the torus. This reflection causes the polarisation.

=== Type 1.2, 1.5, 1.8, and 1.9 Seyfert galaxies ===
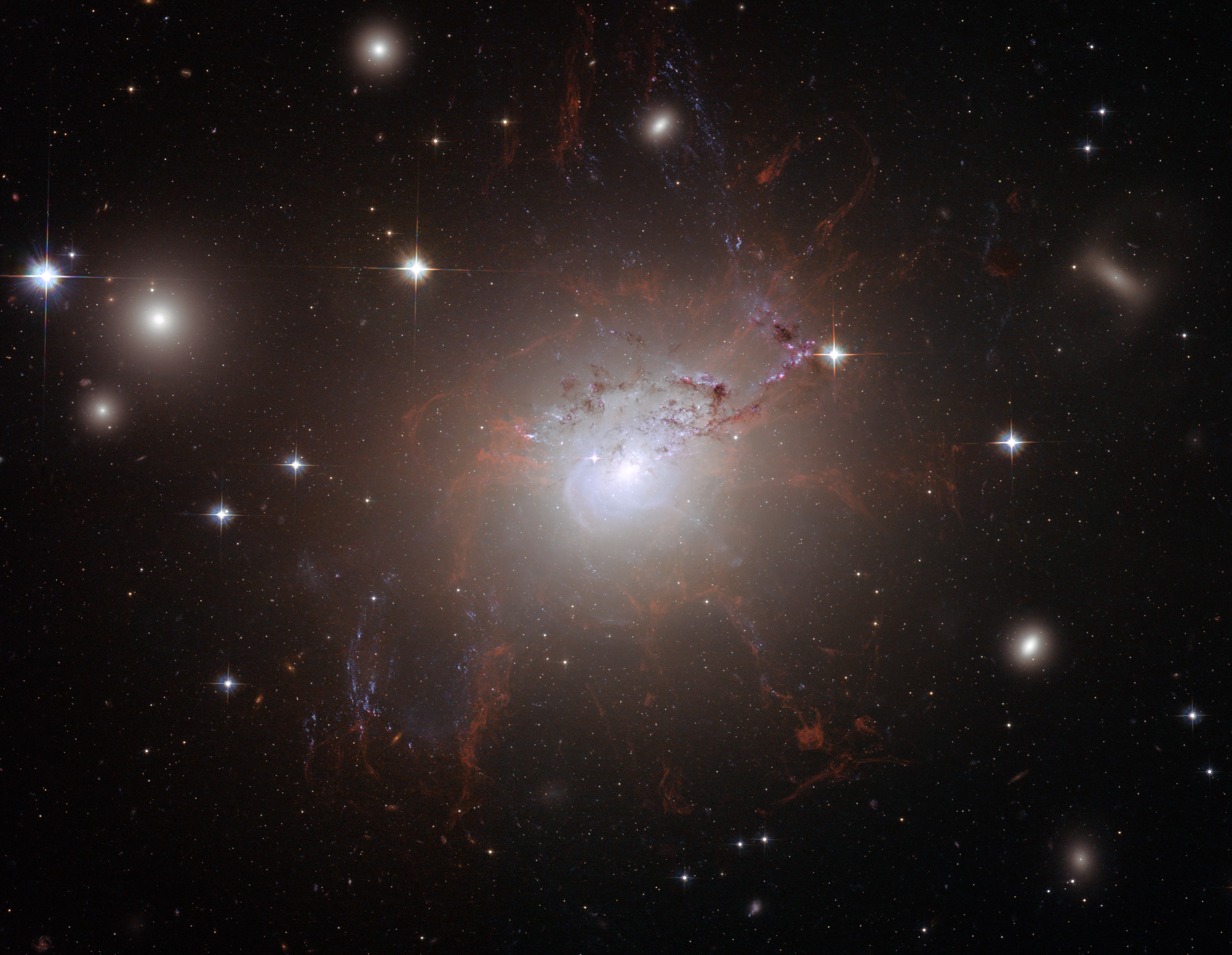
NGC 1275, a Type 1.5 Seyfert galaxy

In 1981, Donald Osterbrock introduced the notations Type 1.5, 1.8 and 1.9, where the subclasses are based on the optical appearance of the spectrum, with the numerically larger subclasses having weaker broad-line components relative to the narrow lines. For example, Type 1.9 only shows a broad component in the Hα line, and not in higher order Balmer lines. In Type 1.8, very weak broad lines can be detected in the Hβ lines as well as Hα, even if they are very weak compared to the Hα. In Type 1.5, the strength of the Hα and Hβ lines are comparable.

=== Other Seyfert-like galaxies ===
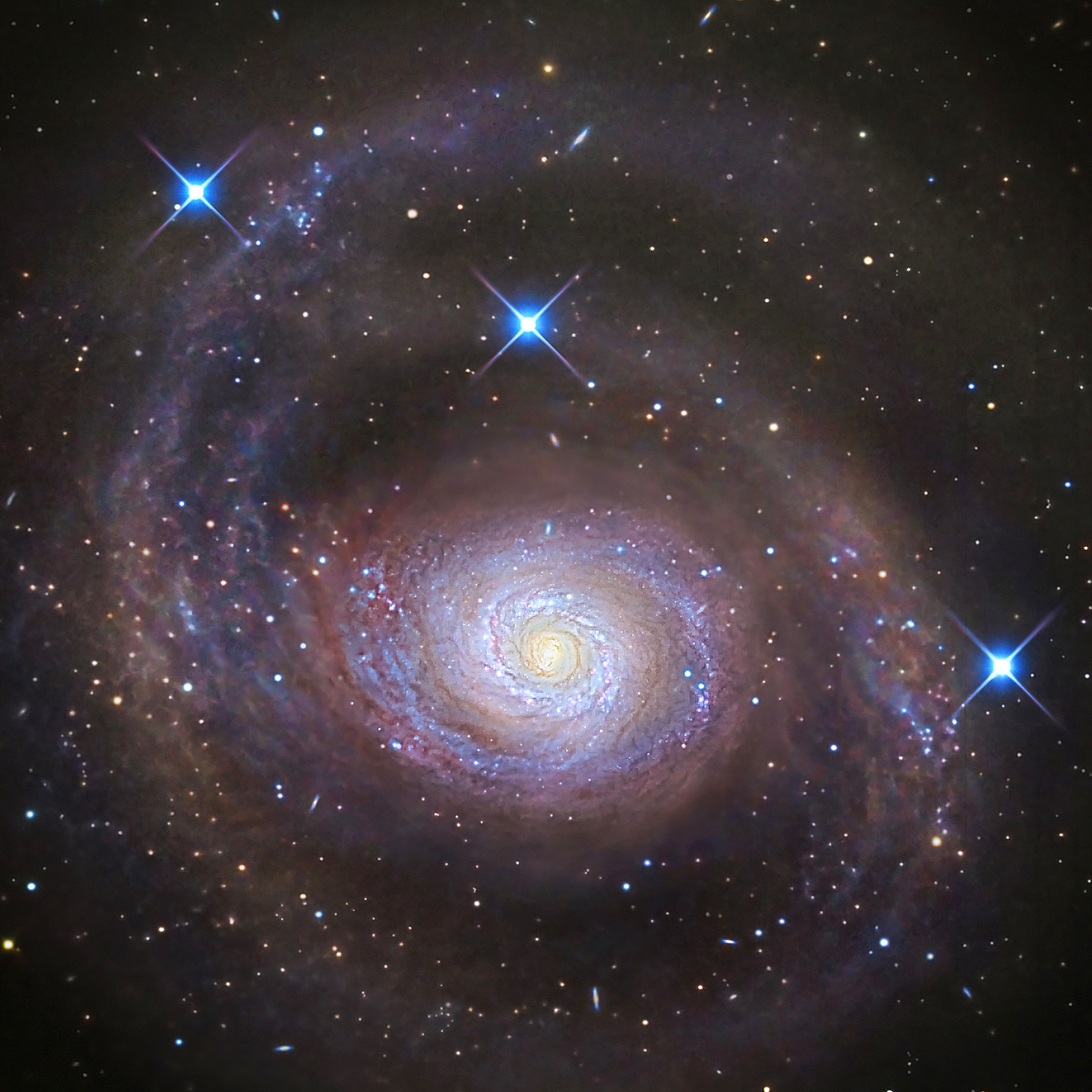
Messier 94, a galaxy with a Seyfert-like LINER nucleus

In addition to the Seyfert progression from Type I to Type II (including Type 1.2 to Type 1.9), there are other types of galaxies that are very similar to Seyferts or that can be considered as subclasses of them. Very similar to Seyferts are the low-ionisation narrow-line-emission radio galaxies (LINER), discovered in 1980. These galaxies have strong emission lines from weakly ionised or neutral atoms, while the emission lines from strongly ionised atoms are relatively weak by comparison. LINERs share a large amount of traits with low-luminosity Seyferts. In fact, when seen in visible light, the global characteristics of their host galaxies are indistinguishable. Also, they both show a broad-line emission region, but the line-emitting region in LINERs has a lower density than in Seyferts. An example of such a galaxy is M104 in the constellation Virgo, also known as the Sombrero Galaxy. A galaxy that is both a LINER and a Type I Seyfert is NGC 7213, a galaxy that is relatively close compared to other AGNs. Another very interesting subclass are the narrow-line Type I galaxies (NLSy1), which have been subject to extensive research in recent years. They have much narrower lines than the broad lines from classic Type I galaxies, steep hard and soft X-ray spectra and strong Fe[II] emission. Their properties suggest that NLSy1 galaxies are young AGNs with high accretion rates, suggesting a relatively small but growing central black hole mass. There are theories suggesting that NLSy1s are galaxies in an early stage of evolution, and links between them and ultraluminous infrared galaxies or Type II galaxies have been proposed.

== Evolution ==
The majority of active galaxies are very distant and show large Doppler shifts. This suggests that active galaxies occurred in the early Universe and, due to cosmic expansion, are receding away from the Milky Way at very high speeds. Quasars are the furthest active galaxies, some of them being observed at distances 12 billion light years away. Seyfert galaxies are much closer than quasars. Because light has a finite speed, looking across large distances in the Universe is equivalent to looking back in time. Therefore, the observation of active galactic nuclei at large distances and their scarcity in the nearby Universe suggests that they were much more common in the early Universe, implying that active galactic nuclei could be early stages of galactic evolution. This leads to the question about what would be the local (modern-day) counterparts of AGNs found at large redshifts. It has been proposed that NLSy1s could be the small redshift counterparts of quasars found at large redshifts (z > 4). The two have many similar properties, for example: high metallicities or similar pattern of emission lines (strong Fe [II], weak O [III]). Some observations suggest that AGN emission from the nucleus is not spherically symmetric and that the nucleus often shows axial symmetry, with radiation escaping in a conical region. Based on these observations, models have been devised to explain the different classes of AGNs as due to their different orientations with respect to the observational line of sight. Such models are called unified models. Unified models explain the difference between Type I and Type II galaxies as being the result of Type II galaxies being surrounded by obscuring toruses which prevent telescopes from seeing the broad line region. Quasars and blazars can be fit quite easily in this model. The main problem of such a unification scheme is trying to explain why some AGN are radio loud while others are radio quiet. It has been suggested that these differences may be due to differences in the spin of the central black hole.

== Examples ==
Here are some examples of Seyfert galaxies:

- Circinus Galaxy, which has rings of gas ejected from its center
- Centaurus A or NGC 5128, apparently the brightest Seyfert galaxy as seen from Earth; a giant elliptical galaxy and also classified as a radio galaxy notable for its relativistic jet spanning more than a million light-years in length
- Cygnus A, the first-identified radio galaxy and the brightest radio source in the sky as seen in frequencies above 1 GHz
- Messier 51a (NGC 5194), the Whirlpool Galaxy, one of the best-known galaxies in the sky
- Messier 64 (NGC 4826), with two counter-rotating disks that are approximately equal in mass
- Messier 66 (NGC 3627), a part of the Leo Triplet
- Messier 77 (NGC 1068), one of the first Seyfert galaxies classified
- Messier 81 (NGC 3031), the second-brightest Seyfert galaxy in the sky after Centaurus A
- Messier 88 (NGC 4501), a member of the large Virgo Cluster and one of the brightest Seyfert galaxies in the sky
- Messier 106 (NGC 4258), one of the best-known Seyfert galaxies, which has a water vapor megamaser in its nucleus seen by 22 GHz line of ortho-H_{2}O
- NGC 262, an example of a galaxy with an extended gaseous H I halo
- NGC 1097, which has four narrow optical jets coming out from its nucleus
- NGC 1275, whose central black hole produces the lowest B-flat note ever recorded
- NGC 1365, notable for its central black hole spinning almost the speed of light
- NGC 1566, one of the first Seyfert galaxies classified
- NGC 1672, which has a nucleus engulfed by intense starburst regions
- NGC 1808, also a starburst galaxy
- NGC 3079, which has a giant bubble of hot gas coming out from its center
- NGC 3185, member of the Hickson 44 group
- NGC 3259, also a strong source of X-rays
- NGC 3783, also a strong source of X-rays
- NGC 3982, also a starburst galaxy
- NGC 4151, which has two supermassive black holes in its center
- NGC 4395, an example of a low-surface-brightness galaxy with an intermediate-mass black hole in its center
- NGC 4725, one of the closest and brightest Seyfert galaxies to Earth; it has a very long spiraling cloud of gas surrounding its center seen in infrared
- NGC 4945, a galaxy relatively close to Centaurus A
- NGC 5033, has a Seyfert nucleus displaced from its kinematic center
- NGC 5548, an example of a lenticular Seyfert galaxy
- NGC 6240, also classified as an ultraluminous infrared galaxy (ULIRG)
- NGC 6251, the X-ray-brightest low-excitation radio galaxy in the 3CRR catalog
- NGC 7479, a spiral galaxy with radio arms opening in a direction opposite to the optical arms
- NGC 7742, an unbarred spiral galaxy; also known as the Fried Egg Galaxy
- IC 2560, a spiral galaxy with a nucleus similar to NGC 1097
- SDSS J1430+2303, a Seyfert I, predicted to host a supermassive black hole binary very close to the point of merger
- UGC 11397, a Seyfert II galaxy
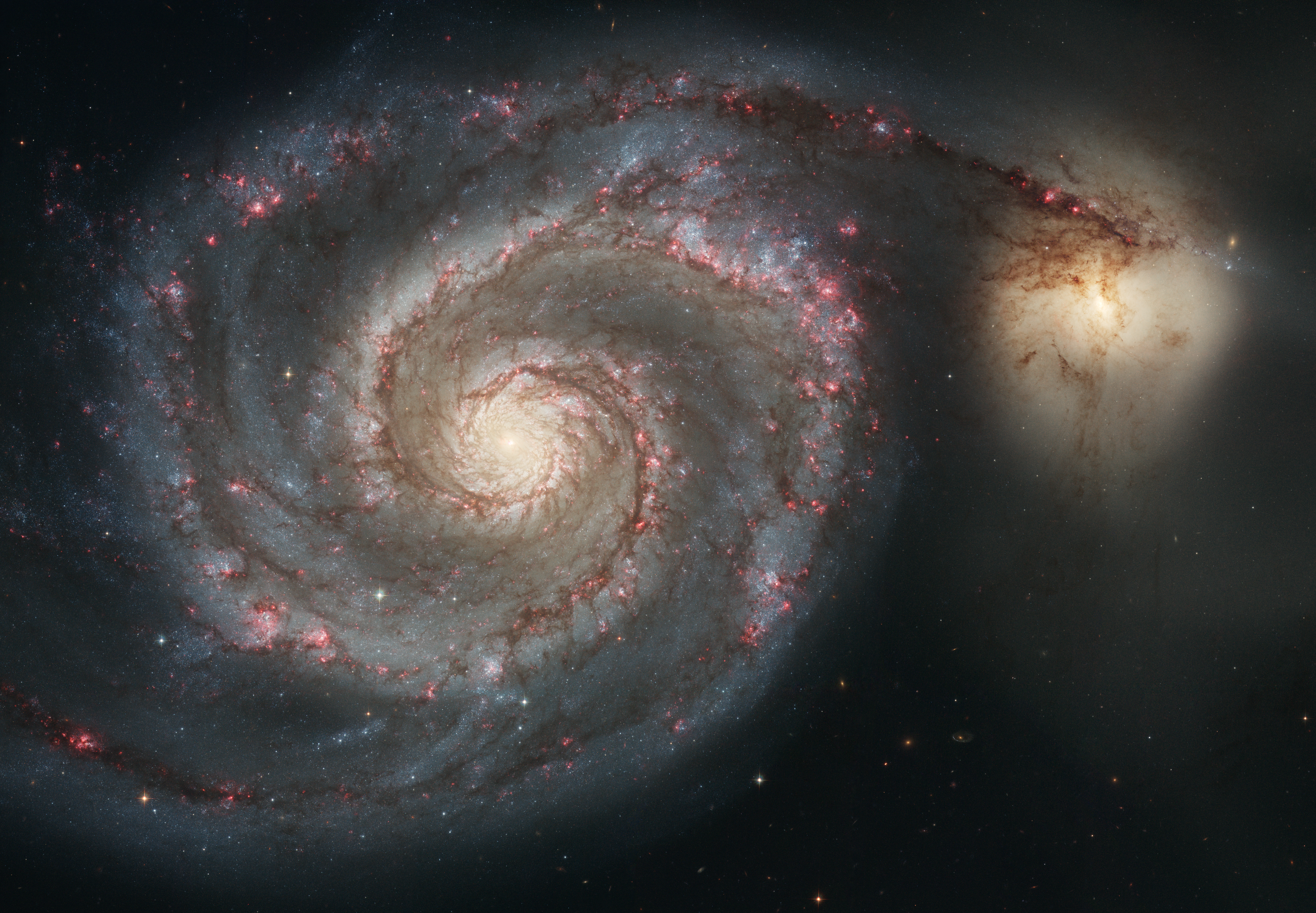
Seyfert galaxy Messier 51

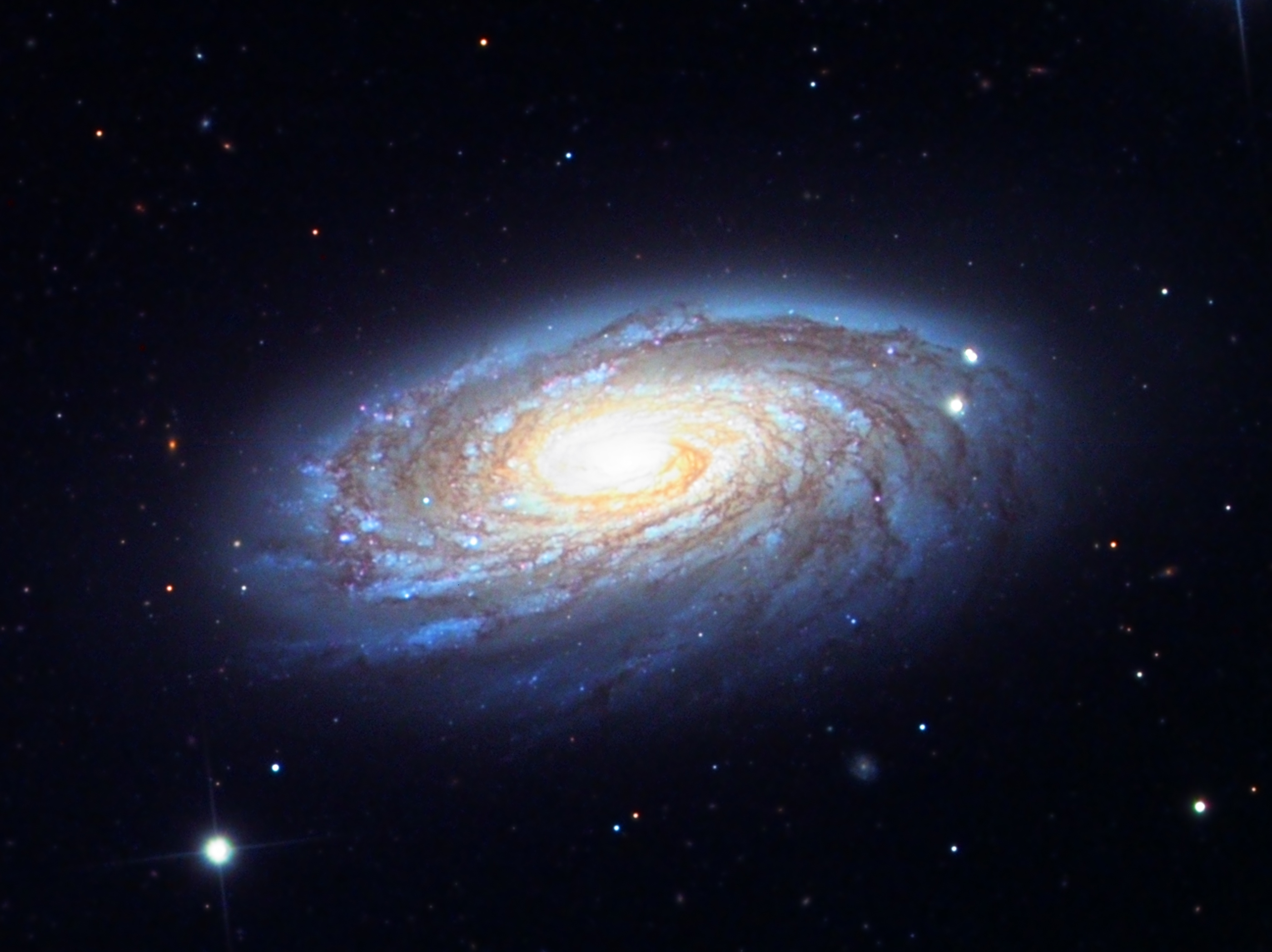
Seyfert galaxy Messier 88

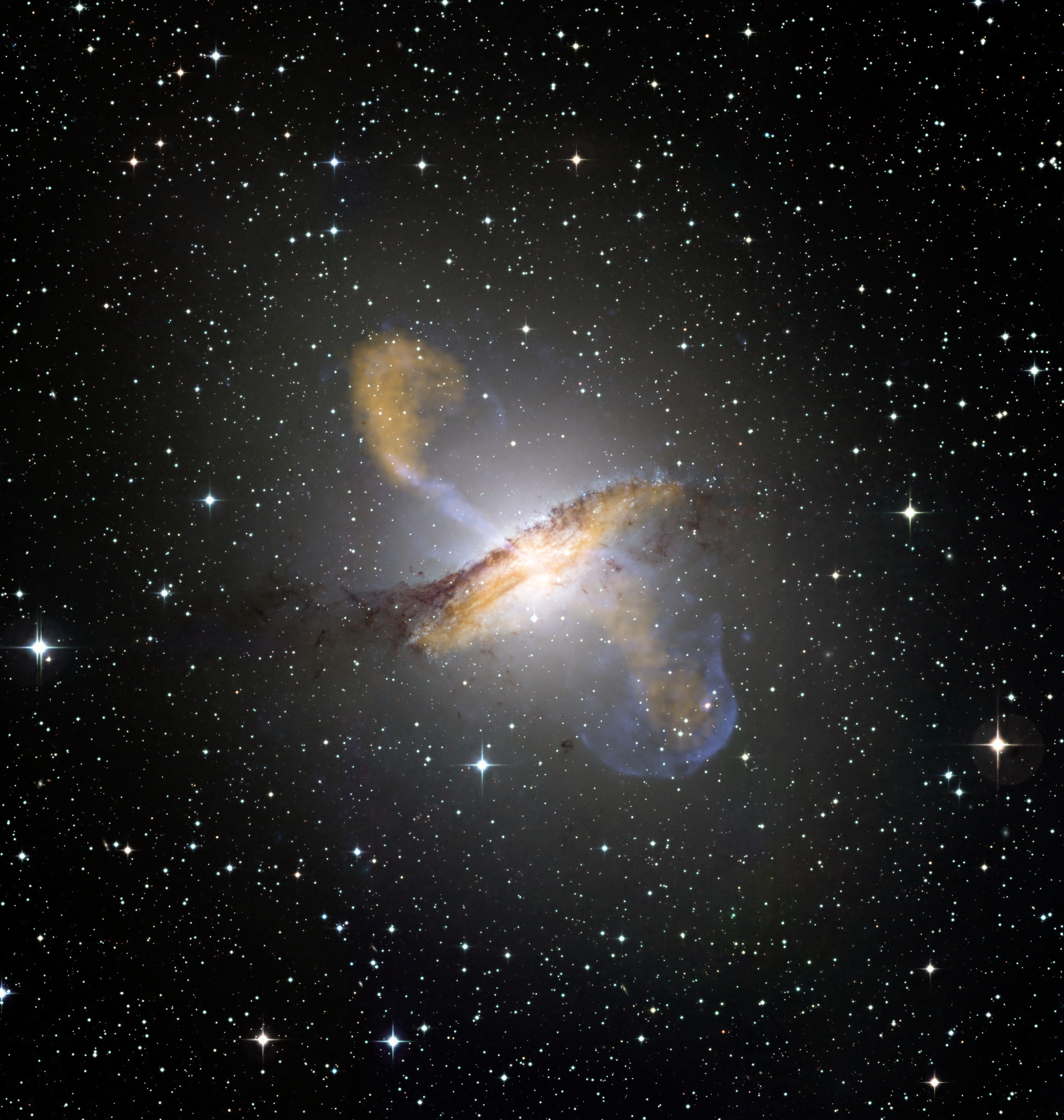
Seyfert galaxy Centaurus A

== See also ==
- Low-ionization nuclear emission-line region – Type of galactic nucleus
