= Susan Simkin =

American observational astronomer who studied Seyfert galaxies (1940–2021)

Susan Marguerite Simkin
- Born: 26 July 1940; Detroit, Michigan
- Died: 5 February 2021 (aged 80)
- Education: Earlham College (BA); University of Wisconsin–Madison (PhD)
- Occupation: Observational astronomer
- Scientific career
- Workplaces: Columbia University, Michigan State University

Susan Marguerite Simkin (née Smith; 26 July 1940–5 February 2021) was an observational astronomer who made significant contributions to the study of Seyfert galaxies as well as astronomical image processing. She was the first female tenured professor at Michigan State University.

== Biography ==
Simkin was born in Detroit, Michigan on 26 July 1940. She studied physics and mathematics at Earlham College in Richmond, Indiana until 1962; marrying Roger Simkin, a medical student, in 1961. Simkin went on to earn a PhD in astronomy at University of Wisconsin–Madison making photoelectric and photographic observations of galaxies. She went on to conduct spectroscopic studies and theoretical models of galaxies as a research associate in Columbia University and Michigan State University, joining the MSU faculty in 1975. She obtained tenure in 1981, the first woman to do so at MSU.

From 1975 to 1979, Simkin conducted a photographic survey of nearby (z < 0.017) Seyfert galaxies on the UK and Palomar Schmidt telescopes, which led to better understanding of their morphologies. With Su Hongjun and Mark Philip Schwarz, they found a correlation between the Seyferts' spiral gas structure and the orbital resonances of their nuclear bars, confirming earlier simulations of AGN feedback.

In 1987, Simkin and her collaborators conducted radio observations of Seyfert galaxy NGC 262 at the Very Large Array. Their measurement put NGC 262 as the largest known astronomical object at the time apart from galaxy clusters.
