= Markarian 1018 =

Galaxy in the constellation Cetus

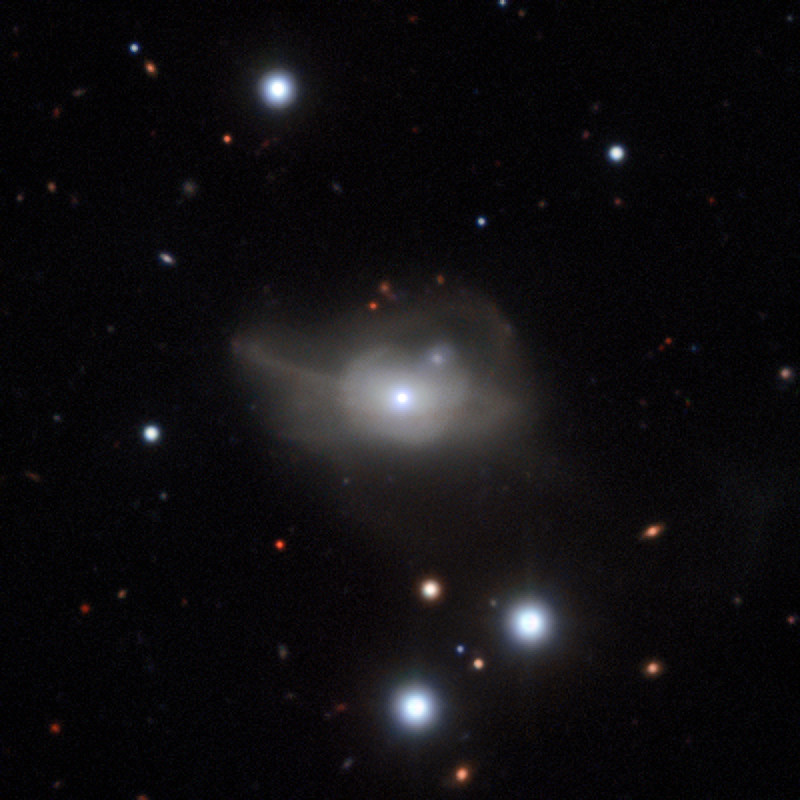
- The Seyfert galaxy Markarian 1018.

Observation data (J2000 epoch)
- Constellation: Cetus
- Right ascension: 02^{h} 06^{m} 15.98^{s}
- Declination: −00° 17′ 29.23″
- Redshift: 0.042957
- Heliocentric radial velocity: 12,878 km/s
- Distance: 607 Mly (186.1 Mpc)
- Apparent magnitude (V): 15.5
- Apparent magnitude (B): 15.9

Characteristics
- Type: S0; merger?, Sy 1.5
- Apparent size (V): 0.99' x 0.52'
- Notable features: Seyfert galaxy

Other designations
- UGC 1597, UM 393, PGC 8029, MCG +00-06-030, CGCG 387-034

Markarian 1018 (Mrk 1018), also known as UGC 1597, is a lenticular galaxy with a peculiar structure located in the constellation Cetus. It is located at an approximate distance of 607 million light years from Earth and has an apparent dimensions of 0.99 by 0.52 arcmin. It is classified as a variable Seyfert galaxy and galaxy merger.

== Characteristics ==
Markarian 1018 is a post merger product of two colliding galaxies indicated by the presence of its disturbed galactic envelope, tidal tails and a faint loop of light surrounding it. It has a stellar mass measured as log M_{*}/M_{☉} = 10.92 and a total star formation of 0.6 M_{☉} yr^{−1}. It has an active galactic nucleus (AGN) like most types of active galaxies with the energy source originating from an accretion disk around its supermassive black hole. The mass of the black hole in Markarian 1018 varies however. In a 2011 study, its mass is around log (M_{BH}/M_{☉}) = 8.15 . But later studies showed the mass is (M_{BH}/M_{☉}) = 7.4. and subsequently (M_{BH}/M_{☉}) = 7.84.

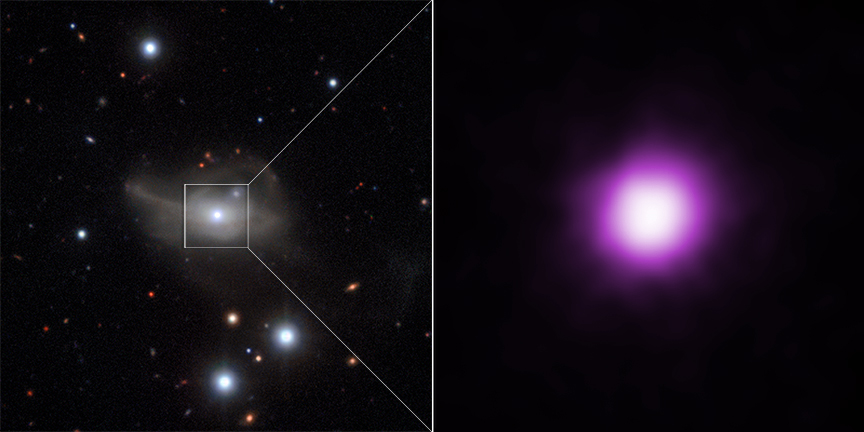
The black hole in the center of Markarian 1018 as observed by Chandra X-ray Observatory.

The appearance of Markarian 1018 is known to shift from a bright to a dim state when observed in X-rays as well as both optical and ultraviolet models detected by Hubble Space Telescope, Sloan Digital Sky Survey and GALEX. This is likely caused by the disruption of the fueling of its black hole by an interaction of a likely secondary black hole in the galaxy.

The AGN of Markarian 1018 is described as variable, changing between Seyfert I and II. It was originally a type 1.9 Seyfert galaxy. Between the years 1979 and 1984, it underwent a transition to become a type I. During the change, its ultraviolet and optical line emission strengthened. However, Markarian 1018 has since changed back into type 1.9 after a period of 30 years. Its broad line flux declined with a Hα factor of 4.75 ± 0.5 while its broad emission lines vanished. This makes the galaxy the first known variable AGN to undergo two transitions in a full cycle. It also shows a very weak continuum with the presence of indistinctive Hα and Hβ emission lines best fitted by a line component with a measurement of FWHM ≈ 7200 km s^{−1}.

The X-ray source of Markarian 1018 has gone through a spectral variation. Between 2005 and 2019, its hardness ratio significantly increased from 0.2 ± 0.1 to 0.4 ± 0.1, between both the 0.5-2 and 2-10 keV bands. In additional, the broadband in the galaxy became dim, as the X-ray, ultraviolet and optical luminosities went down by factors of > 7, > 24 and ~ 9. This sharp decrease is suggested by lower ultraviolet emission. Further evidence also points out the hot medium properties of Markarian 1018 clearly remains the same while a warm component is found to cool down to a temperature of ~ 0.2 keV, suggesting the cooling process plays a major role in weakening the accretion disk's magnetic fields and the cause of ultraviolet dimming.

In late 2016, Markarian 1018 suddenly stopped dimming. It underwent a flaring period in which the galaxy showed an outburst; its magnitude level rising by ~ 0.25 U-band per month until early 2017 according to confirmation from Hubble and Chandra X-ray Observatory. Following resumption of monitoring in July 2017, it has since been only found ~ 0.4 magnitude higher than its flaring period. It has since gone through another outburst this time in 2020. While much of its optical spectrum and primary X-ray flux remained constant, its 6.4 keV iron line strengthened through increased emission. This suggests the accretion rate in Markarian 1018 has changed drastically in short-term.
