= NGC 5793 =

Spiral galaxy in the constellation Libra

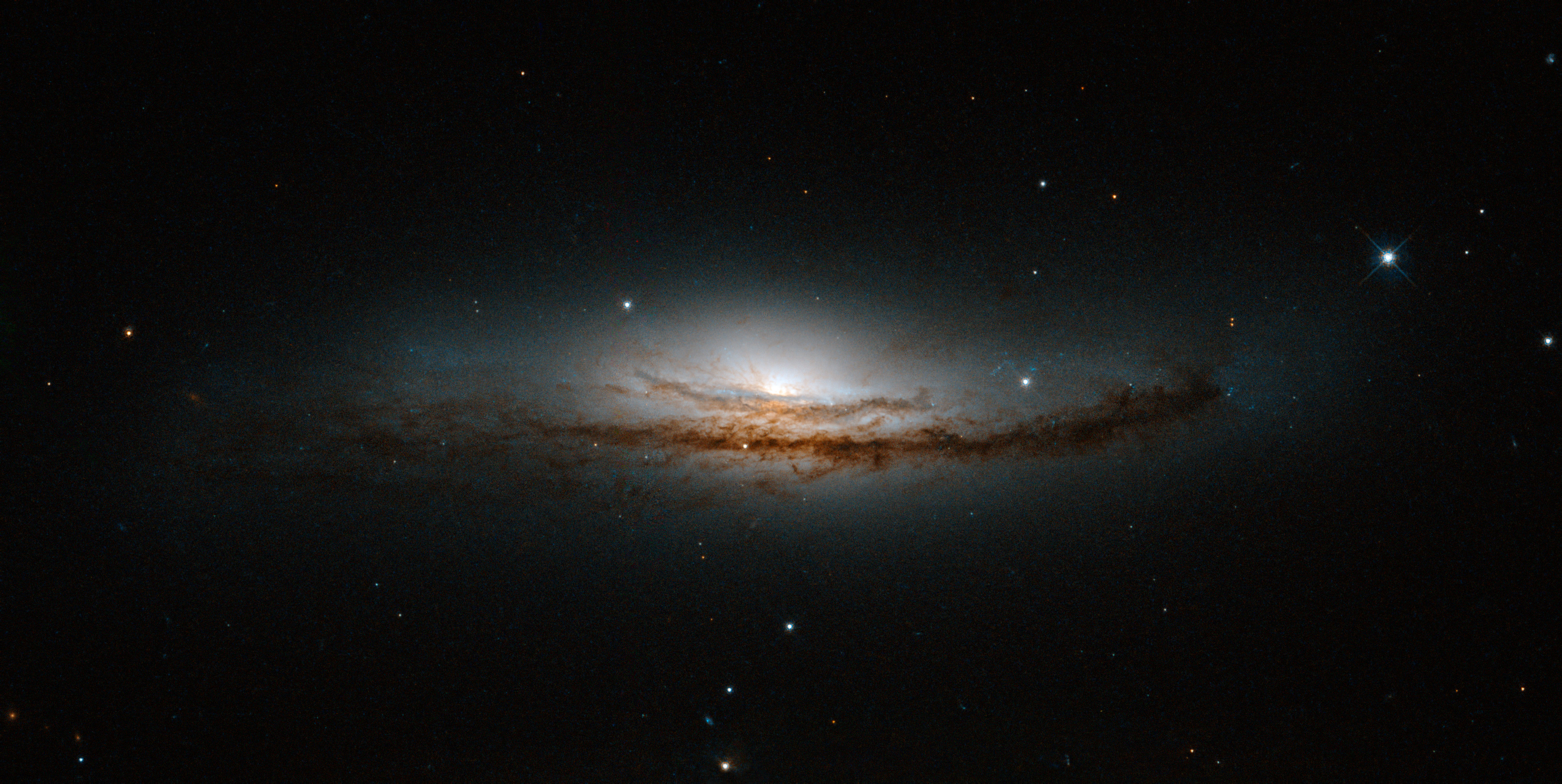
- Hubble Space Telescope image of NGC 5793

Observation data (J2000 epoch)
- Constellation: Libra
- Right ascension: 14^{h} 59^{m} 24.807^{s}
- Declination: −16° 41′ 36.55″
- Redshift: 0.011645
- Heliocentric radial velocity: 3,442±72 km/s
- Distance: 150 Mly (46 Mpc)
- Apparent magnitude (V): 13.32
- Apparent magnitude (B): 14.47

Characteristics
- Type: Sb, Seyfert 2e
- Apparent size (V): 1.160′ × 0.394′ (NIR)

Other designations
- 2MASX J14592480-1641365, NGC 5793, LEDA 49264

NGC 5793 is an active spiral galaxy located approximately 150 million light years away in the constellation Libra. It is classified as a Type 2 Seyfert galaxy and was discovered by Francis Leavenworth in 1886. The galactic plane is inclined at an angle of 73°, giving it an oval, nearly edge-on appearance with the major axis aligned along a position angle of 150°.

Seyfert galaxies such as NGC 5793 are known to house megamasers. Megamasers can have a luminosity of thousands of times greater than the Sun. Neutral hydrogen has been detected against the galactic nucleus. This means that NGC 5793 has an estimated HI cloud size of ≈15 pc and an estimated atomic gas density of ≈200 cm -3.
