= NGC 6300 =

Galaxy in the constellation Ara

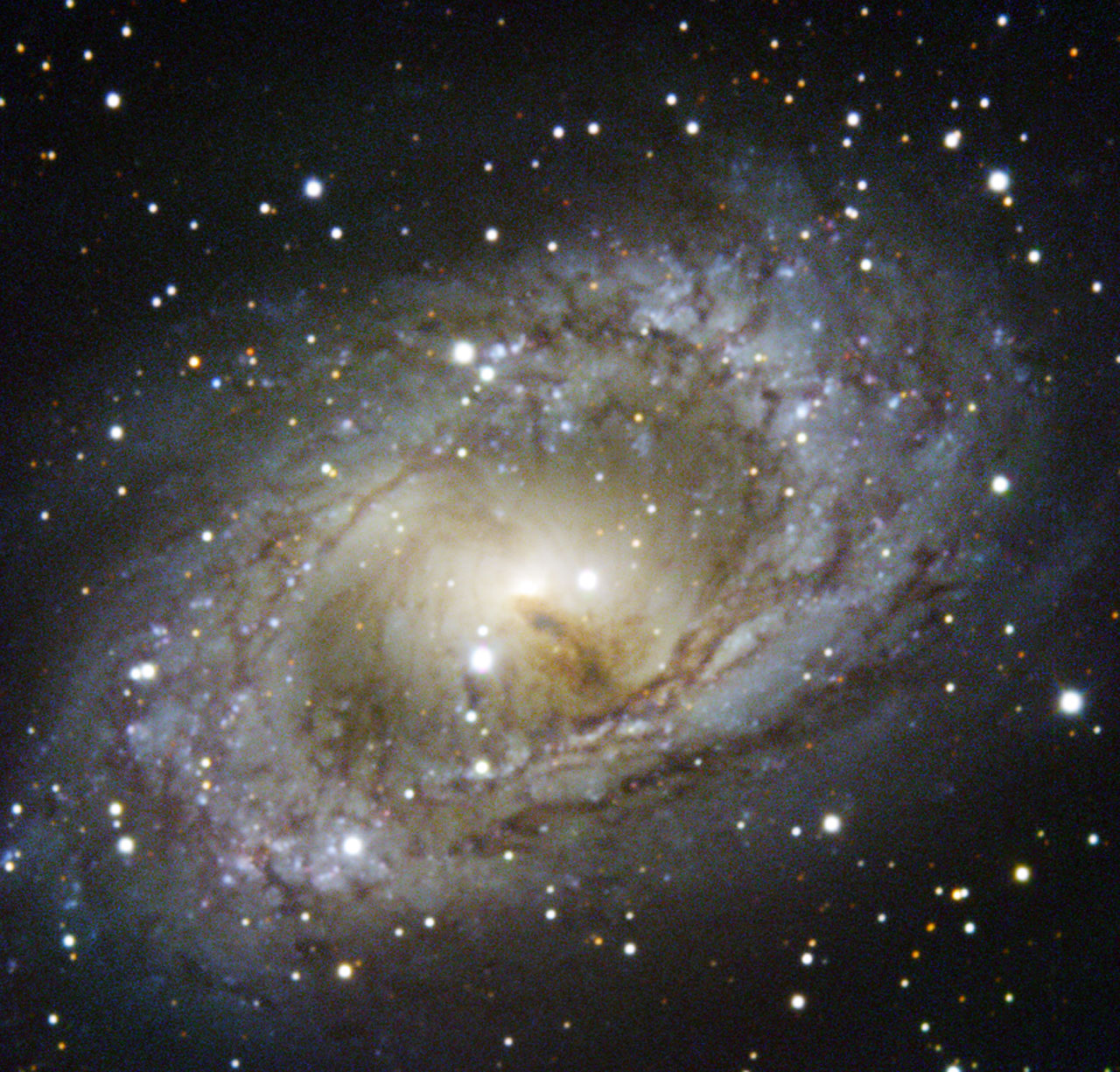
- NGC 6300 as seen through the New Technology Telescope (NTT)

Observation data (J2000 epoch)
- Constellation: Ara
- Right ascension: 17^{h} 16^{m} 59.5^{s}
- Declination: −62° 49′ 40″
- Redshift: 0.003699±0.000010
- Heliocentric radial velocity: 1109±3 km/s
- Galactocentric velocity: 997±5 km/s
- Distance: 50.9 million light years (15.6 million parsecs)
- Magnitude (J): 7.864
- Magnitude (H): 7.198
- Magnitude (K): 6.931

Characteristics
- Type: SB(rs)b
- Size: 64,000 light years
- Apparent size (V): 4.30′ × 2.8′

Other designations
- ESO 101-25, VV 734, IRAS17123-6245 and PGC 60001
- References: NASA/IPAC extragalactic datatbase, http://spider.seds.org/

NGC 6300 is a barred Seyfert spiral galaxy located in the constellation Ara. It is classified as SB(rs)b in the galaxy morphological classification scheme and was discovered by the Scottish astronomer James Dunlop on 30 June 1826. NGC 6300 is located at about 51 million light years away from Earth. It is suspected that a massive black hole (300,000 times the mass of Sun) may be at its center, pulling all the nearby objects into it. In turn, it emits large amounts of X-rays.

NGC 6300 is known to be a Seyfert II galaxy.

== See also ==
- List of NGC objects (6001–7000)
- List of NGC objects
