= SDSS J1430+2303 =

Galaxy with an active nucleus

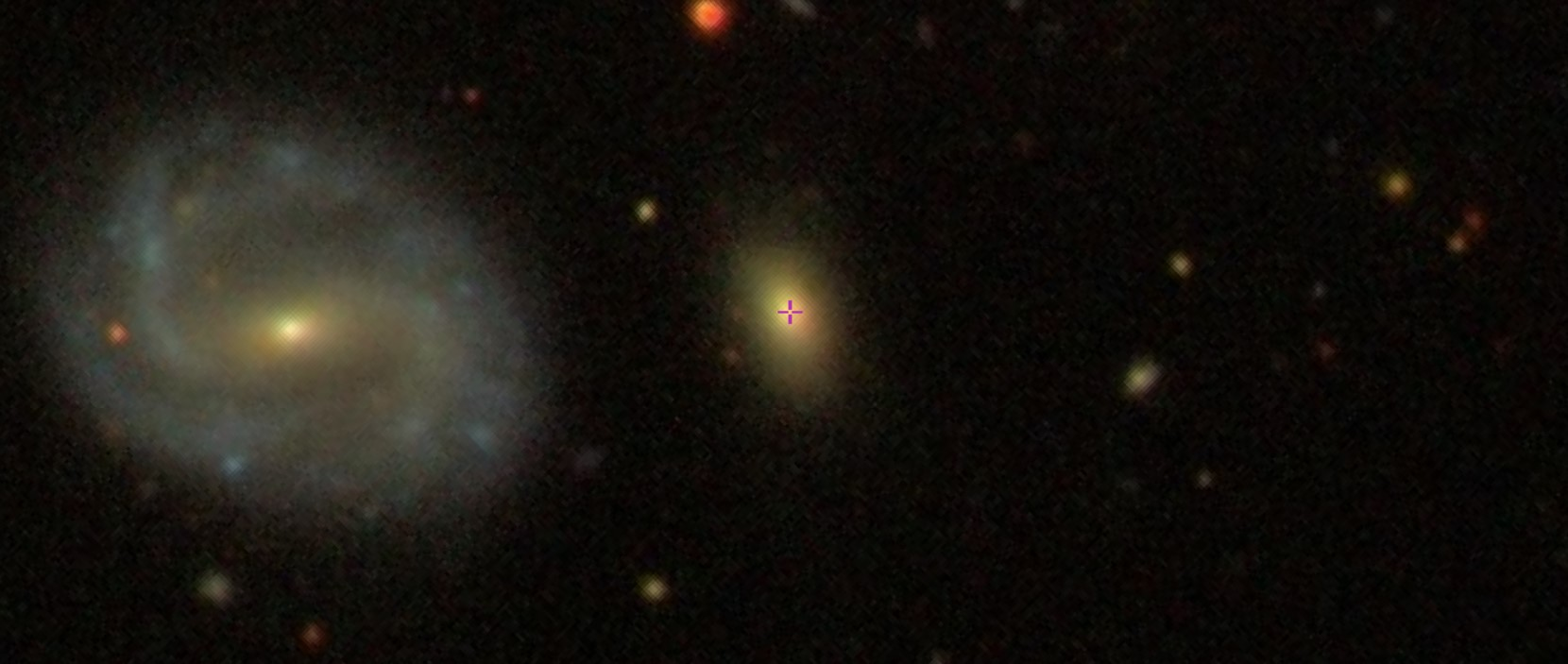
- Sloan Digital Sky Survey image of SDSS J1430+2303. On the left is UGC 9322.

Observation data (J2000 epoch)
- Constellation: Boötes
- Right ascension: 14^{h} 30^{m} 16.04^{s}
- Declination: +23° 03′ 44.5″
- Redshift: 0.08105
- Distance: 339 Mpc (1.11 Gly)

Characteristics
- Type: E/Sy
- Size: ~130,000 ly (diameter)
- Apparent size (V): 0.41 x 0.24

Other designations
- PGC 214276, SDSS J143016.05+230344.4, 2MASS J14301603+2303445, HOLM 655C

SDSS J1430+2303 (or SDSS J143016.05+230344.4) is a galaxy with an active galactic nucleus that has been claimed to be undergoing a periodic brightness variability that is speeding up. One explanation for the purported behavior is that it could be a supermassive black hole binary. Initial trajectory models suggested the pair could be merging either before the end of 2022 or, alternatively, no later than 2025.

The original claim of periodic variations was made in January 2022 in an unrefereed preprint, posted to the ArXiv server, that has not yet been published in a refereed journal as of early 2023. The discovery team later published X-ray observations of the object, finding evidence of strong X-ray variability on timescales of a few days. However, subsequent follow-up observations by two independent groups did not find evidence of continued periodic brightness variations, casting doubt on the binary black hole hypothesis.

== Galaxy ==
SDSS J1430+2303 is a Seyfert 1 galaxy, an elliptical galaxy with a mass of 150 billion solar masses. It forms a triple galaxy system called HOLM 655, alongside UGC 9322 and Markarian 683.

SDSS J1430+2303 is 1.05 × 10^{22} km from Earth (or 1.11 billion light years, 339 Mpc) with a redshift of 0.08105. It has an Hα line emission, blue-shifted by 2400 km/s, relative to other emission lines from the galaxy.

An estimate of a supermassive black hole at its center is 40 million solar masses.
