= UGC 11397 =

Barred spiral galaxy in the constellation Lyra with a quasar

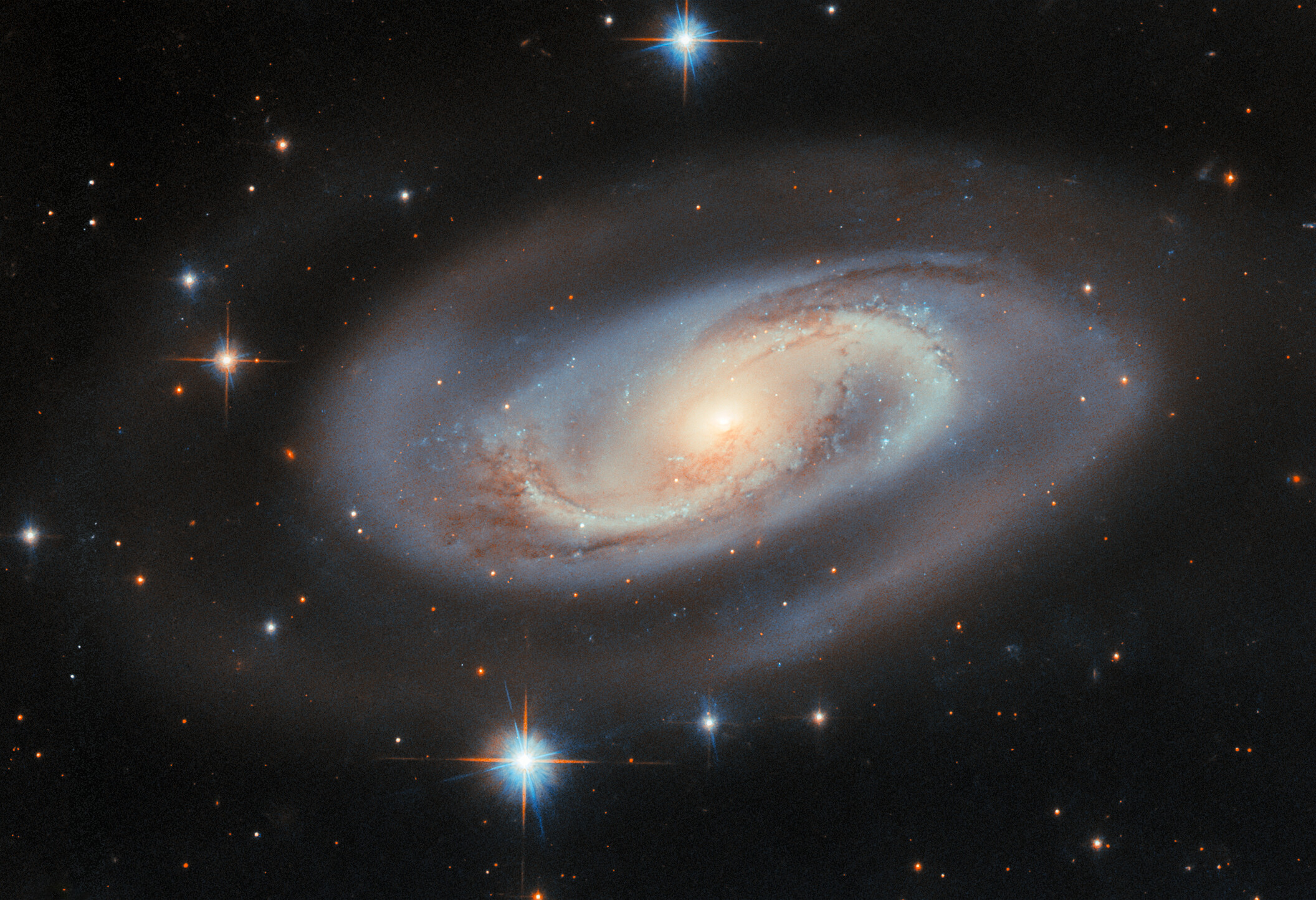
- UGC 11397 imaged by the Hubble Space Telescope

Observation data (J2000 epoch)
- Constellation: Lyra
- Right ascension: 19^{h} 03^{m} 49.1379^{s}
- Declination: +33° 50′ 41.178″
- Redshift: 0.015107±0.000009
- Heliocentric radial velocity: 4,529±3 km/s
- Distance: 257.66 ± 3.08 Mly (79.000 ± 0.945 Mpc)
- Apparent magnitude (V): 13.7

Characteristics
- Type: SBa
- Size: ~121,600 ly (37.27 kpc) (estimated)
- Apparent size (V): 1.1′ × 0.6′

Other designations
- IRAS 19019+3346, 2MASX J19034916+3350407, PGC 62725, CGCG 202-003

UGC 11397 is a barred spiral galaxy in the constellation of Lyra. Its velocity with respect to the cosmic microwave background is 4,361±12 km/s, which corresponds to a Hubble distance of 209.8 ± 14.7 Mly (64.31 ± 4.51 Mpc). However, three non-redshift measurements give a farther distance of 257.66 ± 3.08 Mly (79.000 ± 0.945 Mpc). The first known reference to this galaxy comes from volume III of the Catalogue of Galaxies and of Clusters of Galaxies compiled by Fritz Zwicky in 1966, where it was listed as CGCG 202-003.

UGC 11397 is a Seyfert II Galaxy, i.e. it has a quasar-like nucleus with very high surface brightnesses whose spectra reveal strong, high-ionisation emission lines, but unlike quasars, the host galaxy is clearly detectable.

The center of UGC 11397 harbors a supermassive black hole, with a mass of 174 million M_{☉}.
