= NGC 3259 =

Galaxy in the constellation Ursa Major

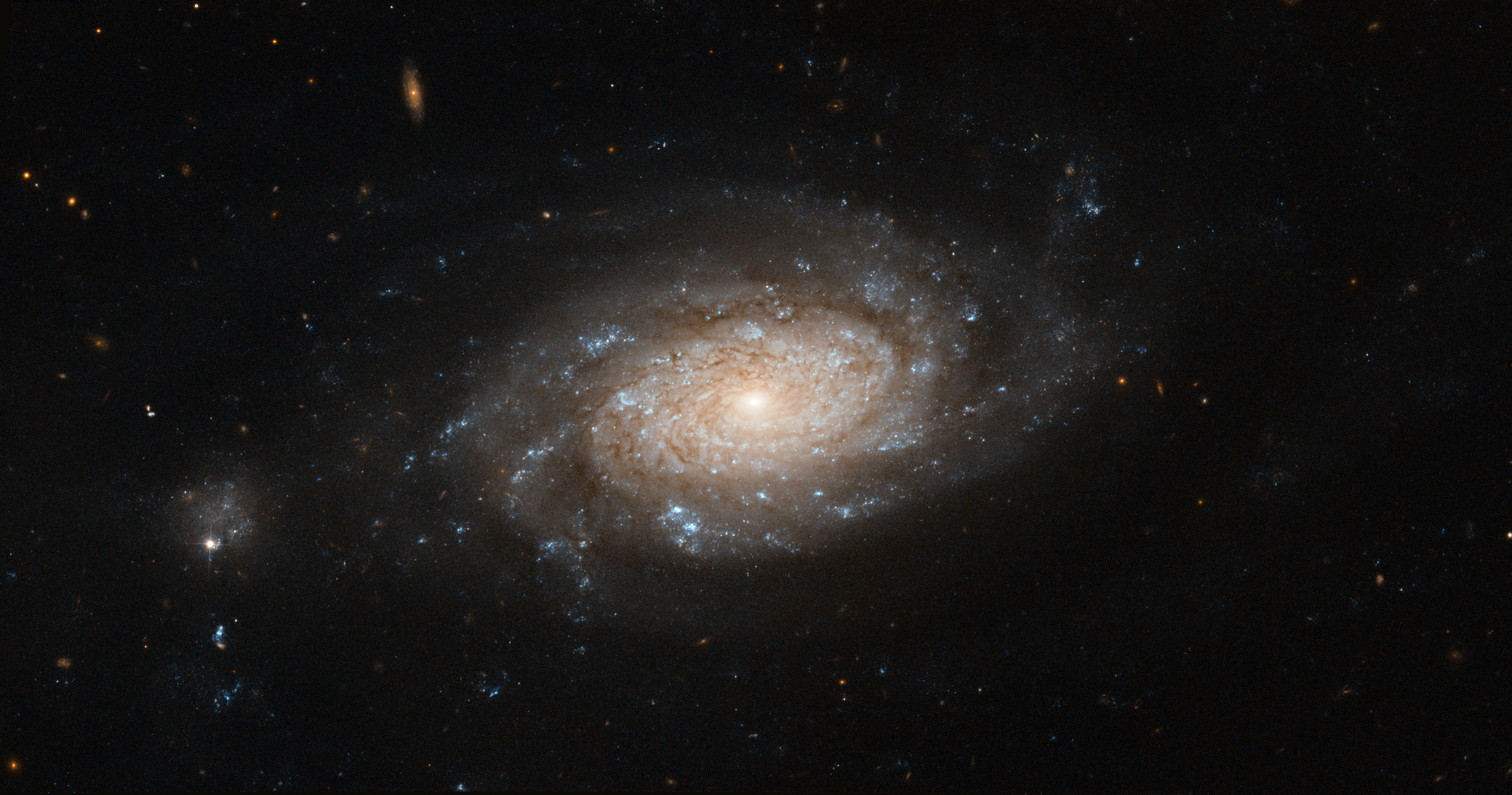
- NGC 3259 is a bright barred spiral galaxy located approximately 110 million light-years from Earth.

Observation data (J2000 epoch)
- Constellation: Ursa Major
- Right ascension: 10^{h} 32^{m} 34.816^{s}
- Declination: +65° 02′ 27.79″
- Heliocentric radial velocity: +1,677 km/s
- Distance: 89.7 Mly (27.5 Mpc)

Characteristics
- Type: SAB(rs)bc
- Mass: 1.26 × 10^{10} M_{☉}

Other designations
- UGC 5717, PGC 31145

NGC 3259 is a barred spiral galaxy located approximately 90 million light-years from Earth, in the constellation Ursa Major. It has the morphological classification SAB(rs)bc, which indicates that it is a spiral galaxy with a weak bar across the nucleus (SAB), an incomplete inner ring structure circling the bar (rs), and moderate to loosely wound spiral arms (bc). This galaxy is a known source of X-ray emission and it has an active galactic nucleus of the Seyfert 2 type.

NGC 3259 has a central black hole with a mass between 17,000 and 41,000 times that of the Sun, which is low for a supermassive black hole; this makes it a lesser-mass supermassive black hole (LSMBH).
