= U band =

Waveguide U band
- Frequency range: 40 to 60 GHz

The U band is a range of frequencies contained in the microwave region of the electromagnetic spectrum. Common usage places this range between 40 and 60 GHz, but may vary depending on the source using the term.
