= Su Hongjun =

- Born: March 10, 1940; Haining, Zhejiang, China
- Died: February 2, 2017 (aged 76); Beijing, China
- Education: Peking University
- Scientific career
- Fields: Astrophysics; Astronomical instruments
- Workplaces: Purple Mountain Observatory, CAS; National Astronomical Observatories, CAS

Su Hongjun (simplified Chinese: 苏洪钧; traditional Chinese: 蘇洪鈞; pinyin: Sū Hóngjūn; March 10, 1940 – February 2, 2017) was a Chinese astronomer who once led the LAMOST project.

At age 17, Su was enrolled in the Department of Physics, Peking University, but he transferred to the Department of Geophysics in 1959. Then he transferred to the newly established Department of Astronomy in the next year, and graduated from there in 1963.

== Career ==
Su studied and worked at Purple Mountain Observatory until he was moved to Beijing in 1997.

In 1979, Su arrived at Mount Stromlo Observatory to conduct research with its telescope.

In 1982, Su went to Michigan State University as a visiting scholar for the further research.

In 1991, Su was sent to Buenos Aires as a member of the Chinese Astronomical Society delegation to the 21st IAU General Assembly.

Su successively served as the secretary general of the Chinese Astronomical Society, the deputy director of Purple Mountain Observatory and the deputy director of Beijing Observatory. Besides the astrophysics, Su also made important contributions to the development of Chinese astronomical instruments and took a post of adjunct research fellow at Nanjing Institute of Astronomical Optics & Technology (NIAOT).
