= NGC 1792 =

Galaxy in the constellation Columba

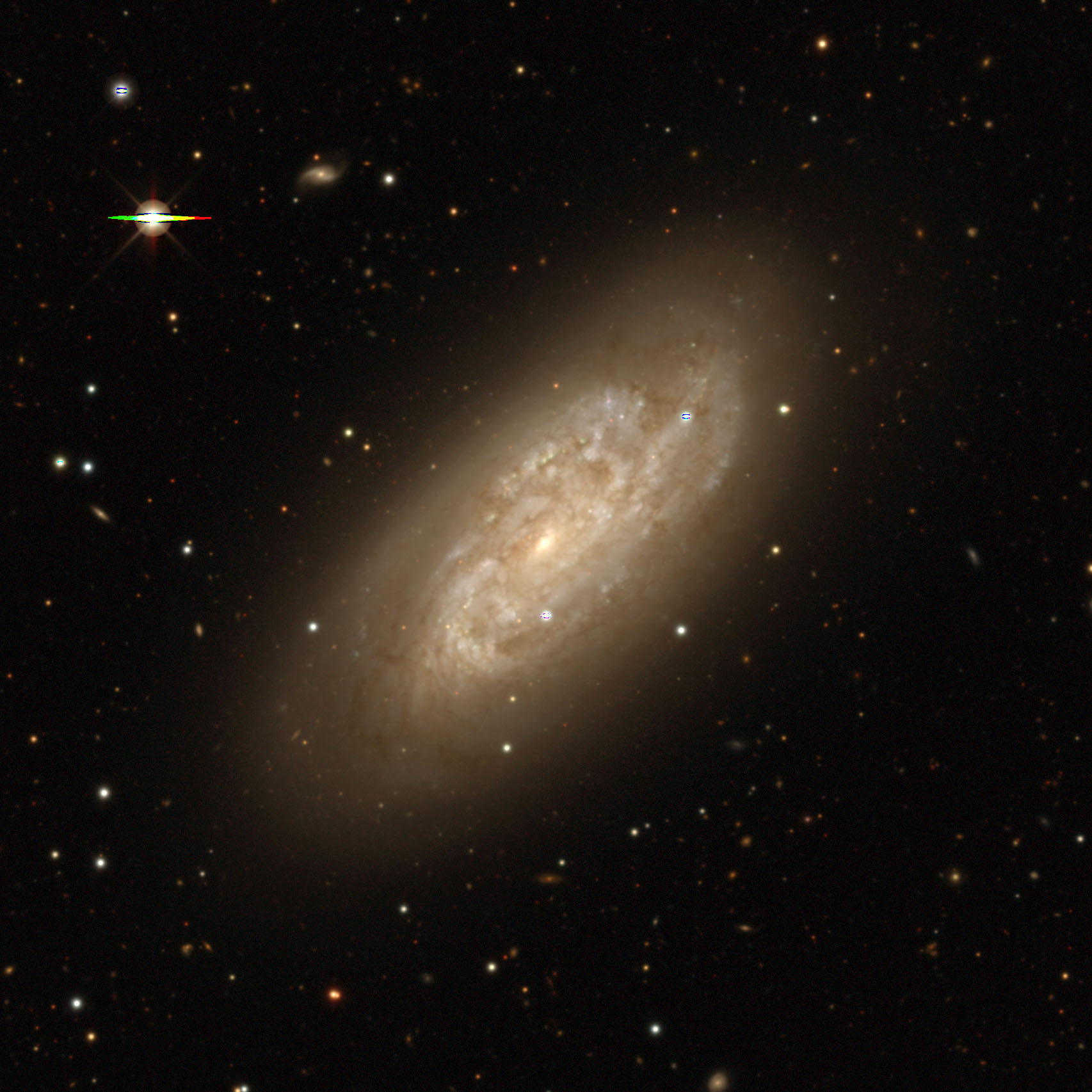
- NGC 1792 with the legacy surveys

Observation data (J2000 epoch)
- Constellation: Columba
- Right ascension: 05^{h} 05^{m} 14.454^{s}
- Declination: −37° 58′ 50.70″
- Redshift: 0.004059
- Heliocentric radial velocity: 1,208
- Distance: 36.4 Mly (11.17 Mpc)
- Group or cluster: NGC 1808
- Apparent magnitude (V): 10.18
- Apparent magnitude (B): 10.68

Characteristics
- Type: SA(rs)bc
- Mass: 0.54×10^{11} M_{☉}
- Mass/Light ratio: 3.4 M_{☉}/L_{☉}

Other designations
- IRAS 05035-3802, NGC 1792, PGC 16709, MCG -6-12-004, ESO 305-6, ESO LV3050060

NGC 1792 is a spiral galaxy located in the southern constellation Columba. It was discovered by Scottish astronomer James Dunlop on October 4, 1826. This galaxy is located at a distance of about 36.4 million light-years and is receding from the Milky Way with a heliocentric radial velocity of 1,208 km/s. NGC 1792 is a member of the NGC 1808 cluster of galaxies.

The morphological classification of this galaxy in the de Vaucouleurs system is SA(rs)bc, indicating a spiral galaxy with no central bar (SA), moderately wound arms (bc), and an incomplete ring structure. However, the HyperLEDA classification of SBbc suggests it does have a bar. It has a flocculent appearance with no central bulge. In the B-band, the angular extend of the galaxy spans 7′.5 × 3′.1. The plane of the galaxy is inclined at an angle of 66° to the line of sight from the Earth, with the major axis being aligned along a position angle of 317°.

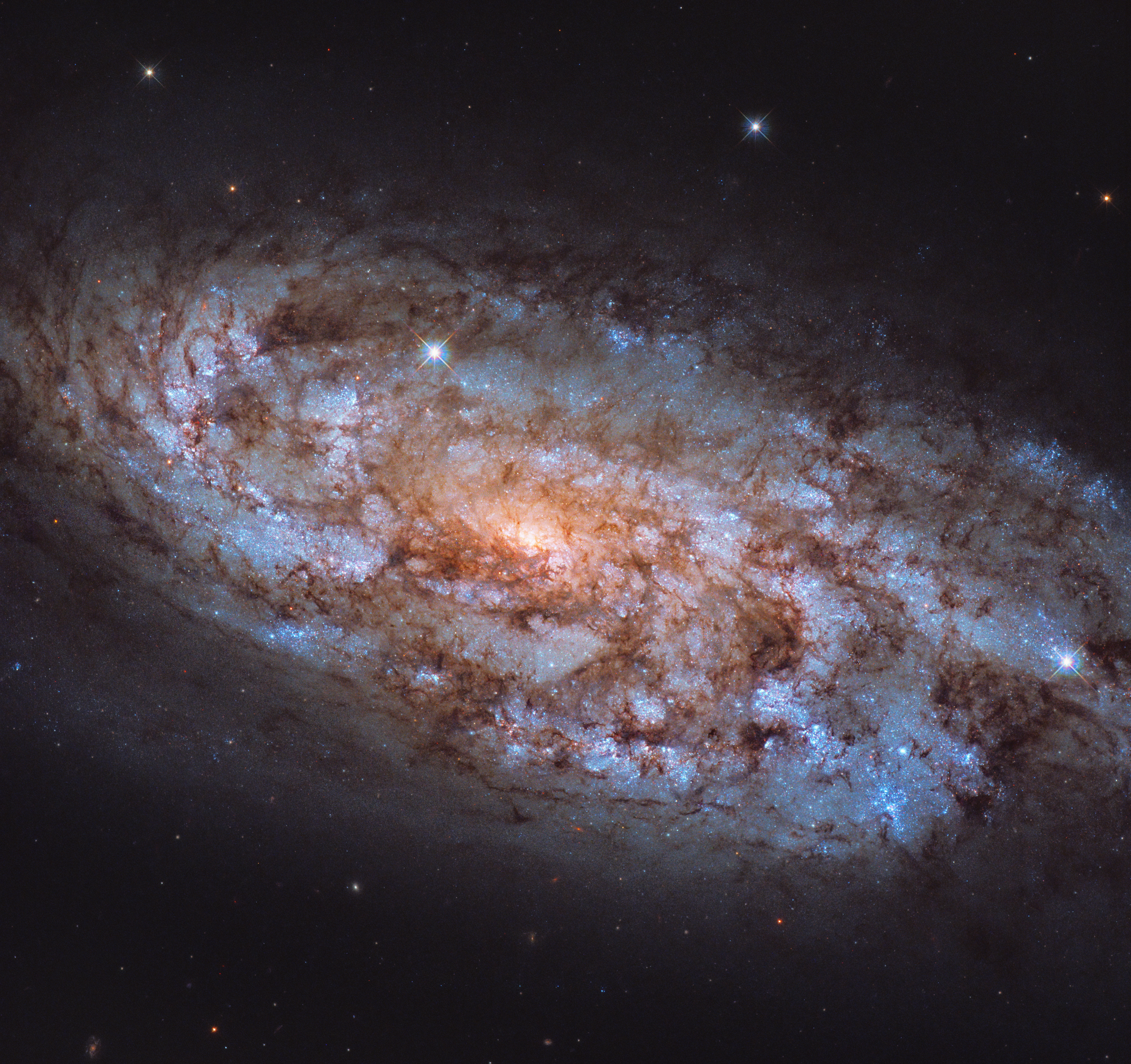
Hubble Space Telescope image of NGC 1792 with the blue regions indicating younger stars

There is a high level of star formation along the spiral arms at distances of more than 3 kpc from the galactic core, which have led to a number of prominent H II regions. A comparable high level of star formation in the nearby NGC 1808 galaxy may indicate a recent, distant tidal interaction between the two. Radio emission from the neutral hydrogen in the NGC 1792 galaxy shows a pronounced asymmetry, most likely as a result of this interaction. As the galaxy appears only slightly disturbed, this interaction mainly impacted the outer parts of the galaxy.

The star formation rate in NGC 1792 is estimated to be 11.0 M_{☉}·yr^{−1}. Soft x-ray emission has been detected, the majority of which may be coming from X-ray binaries.
