= NGC 1808 =

Galaxy in the constellation Columba

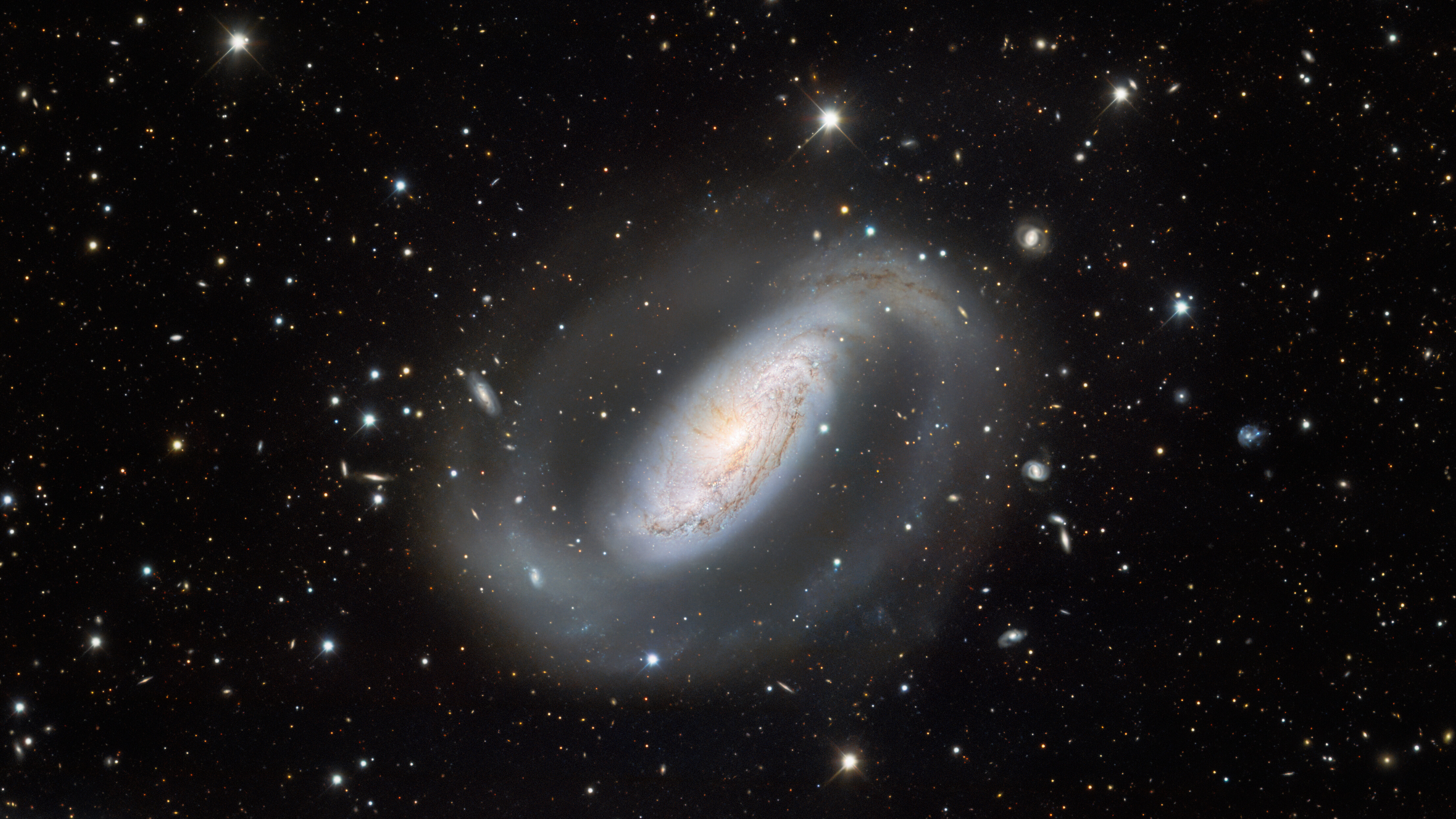
- NGC 1808 imaged by the Cerro Tololo Inter-American Observatory

Observation data (J2000 epoch)
- Constellation: Columba
- Right ascension: 05^{h} 07^{m} 42.331^{s}
- Declination: −37° 30′ 45.88″
- Redshift: 0.003339
- Distance: 41.7 ± 3.9 Mly (12.8 ± 1.2 Mpc)
- Group or cluster: Dorado Group
- Apparent magnitude (V): 9.94
- Apparent magnitude (B): 10.83

Characteristics
- Type: (R)SAB(s)a
- Size: ~88,100 ly (27.01 kpc) (estimated)
- Apparent size (V): 7′.41 × 3′.39

Other designations
- ESO 305- G 008, IRAS 05059-3734, MCG -06-12-005, PGC 16779

NGC 1808 is a barred spiral galaxy located in the southern constellation of Columba, about two degrees to the south and east of Gamma Caeli. It was discovered on 10 May 1826 by Scottish astronomer James Dunlop, who described it as a "faint nebula". The galaxy is a member of the NGC 1808 group, which is part of the larger Dorado Group.

The morphological classification of this galaxy is (R)SAB(s)a, which indicates a spiral galaxy with a weak-bar around the nucleus (SAB), no ring around the bar (s), an outer ring (R), and tightly-wound spiral arms (a). It is inclined by an angle of 57° to the line of sight from the Earth, with the long axis oriented at a position angle of 324°. The disk of gas and stars shows a noticeable warp, and there is a pronounced asymmetry in the distribution of neutral hydrogen and H II regions.

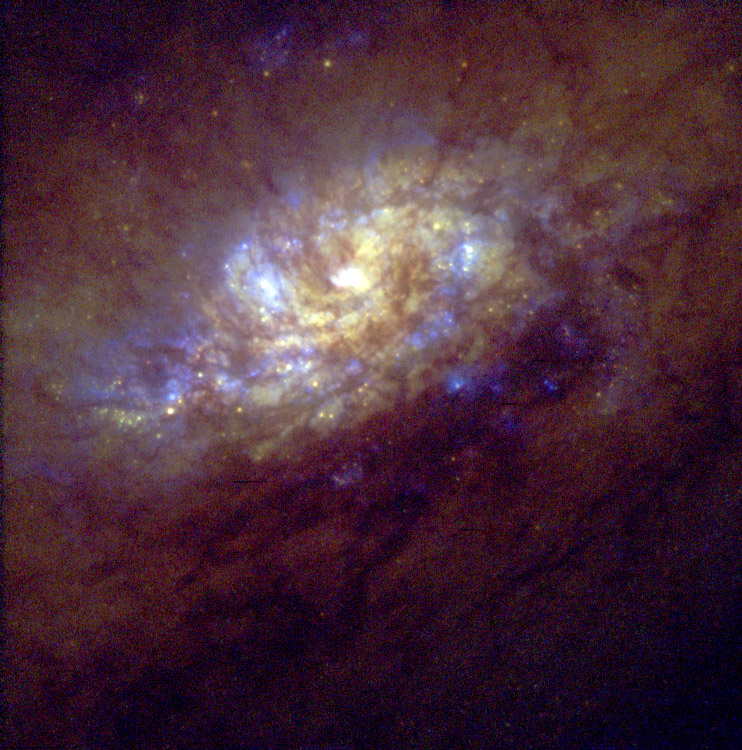
A Hubble Space Telescope image of the center of NGC 1808 (Credit: HST/NASA/ESA)

The core region contains a suspected weak active galactic nucleus plus a circumnuclear ring containing star clusters and supernova remnants at a distance of ~280 pc from the center. These form a ring of peculiar "hot spots". It was formerly identified as a possible Seyfert galaxy, but evidence now points to starburst activity in a ~500 pc radius around the center. A probable outflow of gas is directed to the north-east from the nucleus, forming prominent dust lanes. The high level of star formation in this galaxy and the nearby NGC 1792 may indicate a recent, distant tidal interaction between the two.

== Supernova ==
One supernova has been observed in NGC 1808: SN 1993af (Type Ia, mag. 17) was discovered by Marina Wischnjewsky on 15 November 1993 at 220″ east and 94″ north of the galactic nucleus.

== Image Gallery ==
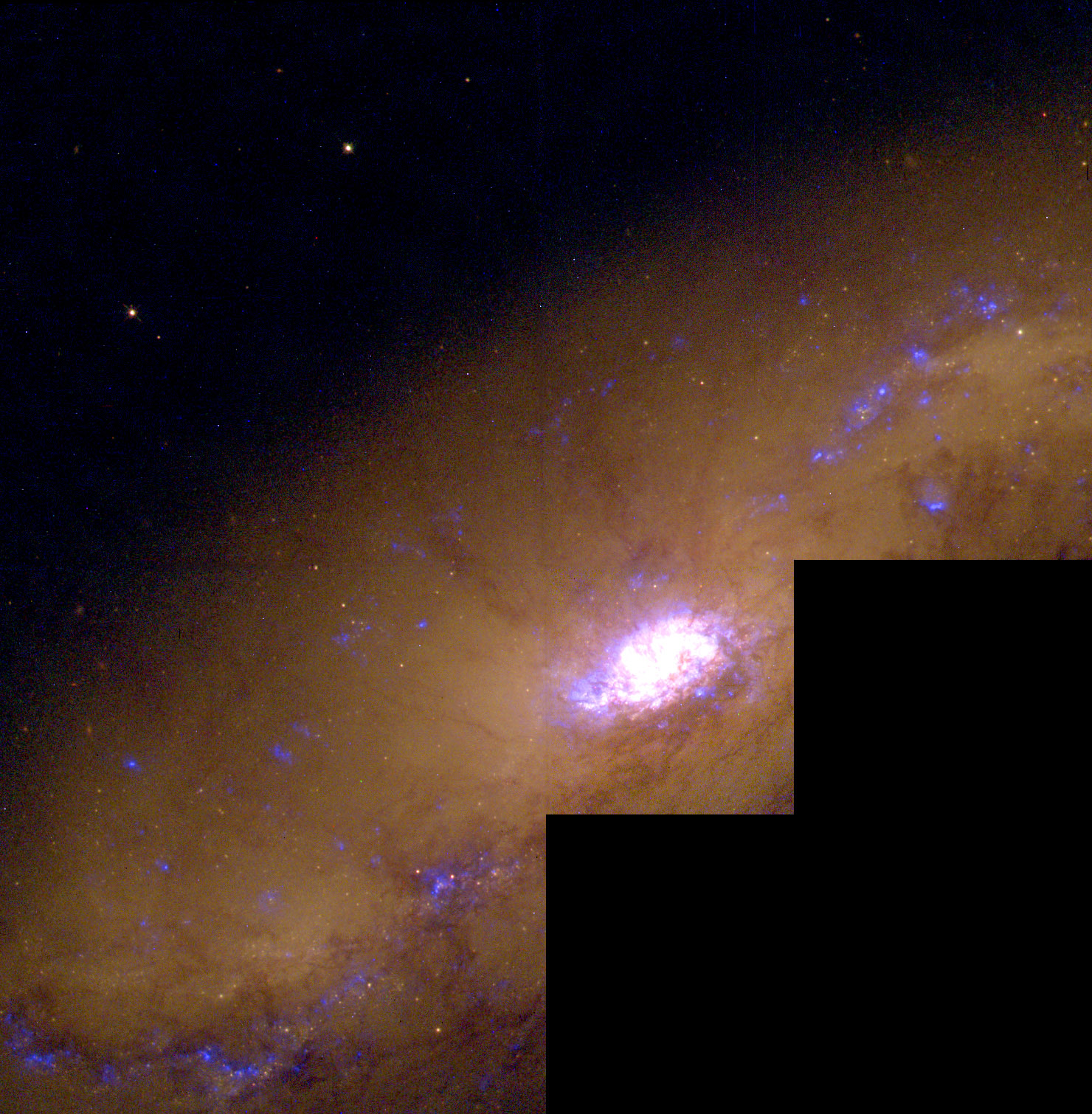
A Hubble Space Telescope image of NGC 1808 taken using WFPC2

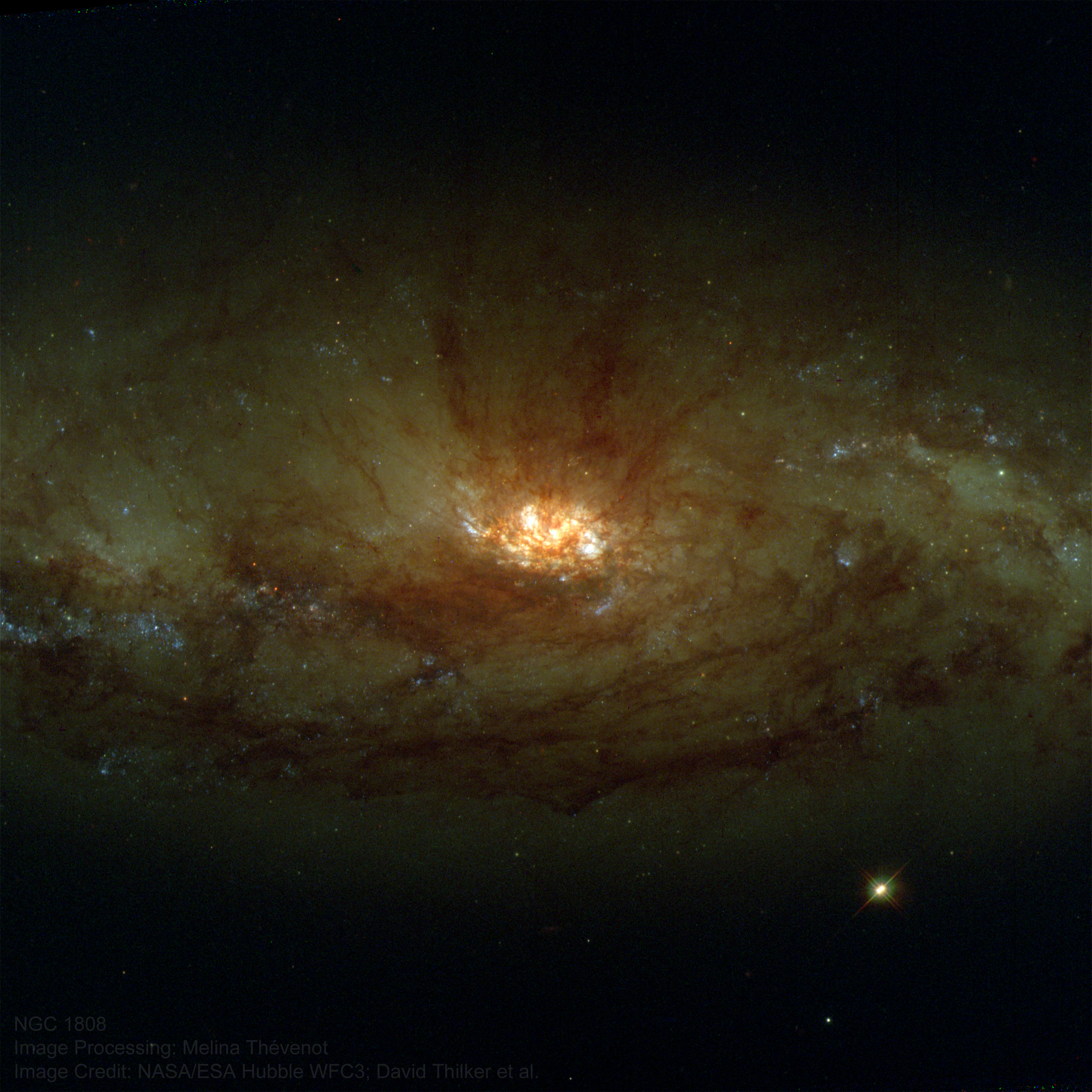
Hubble WFC3 image of the galaxy

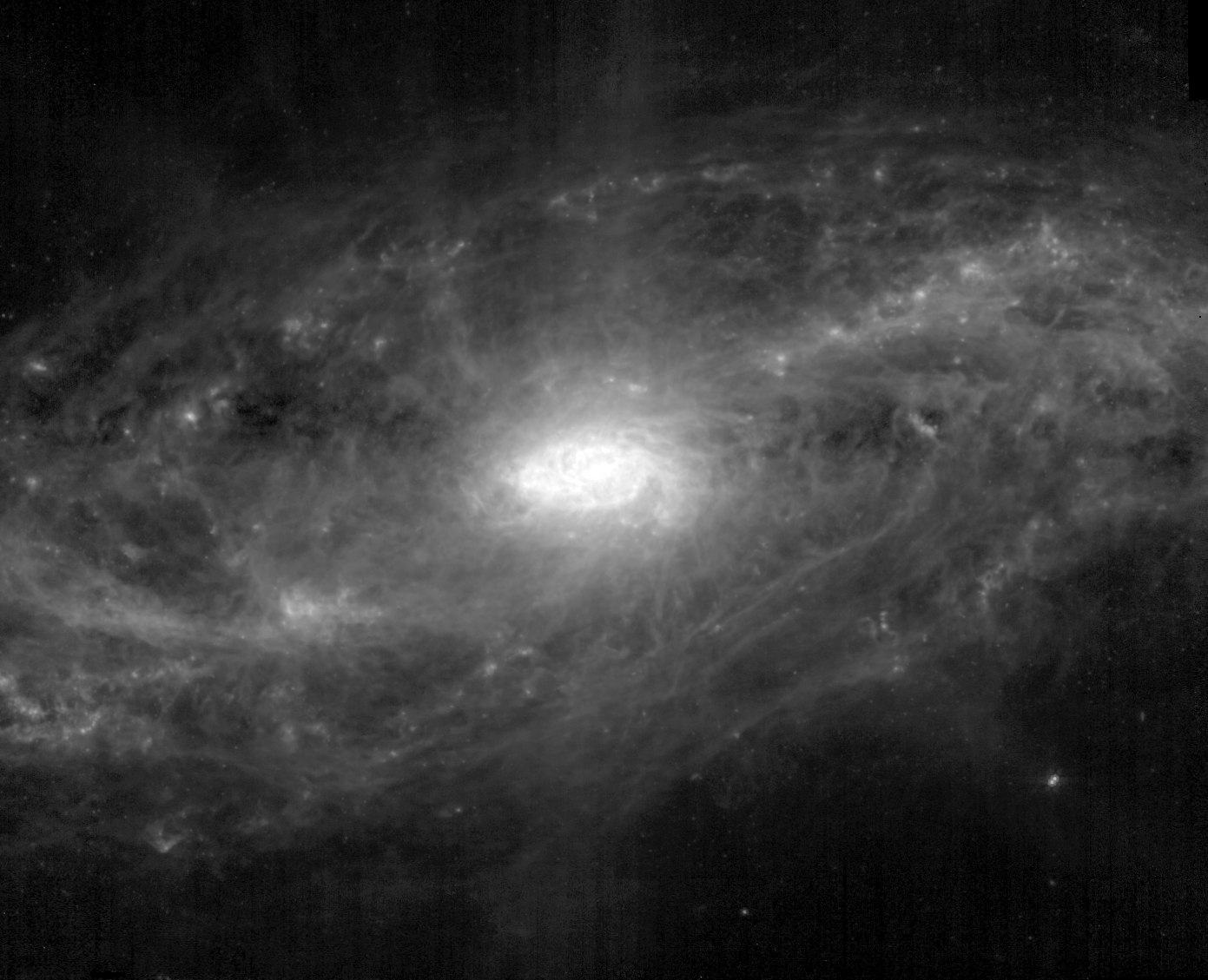
JWST MIRI image of the galaxy

== See also ==
- List of NGC objects (1001–2000)
