= NGC 1090 =

Galaxy in the constellation Cetus

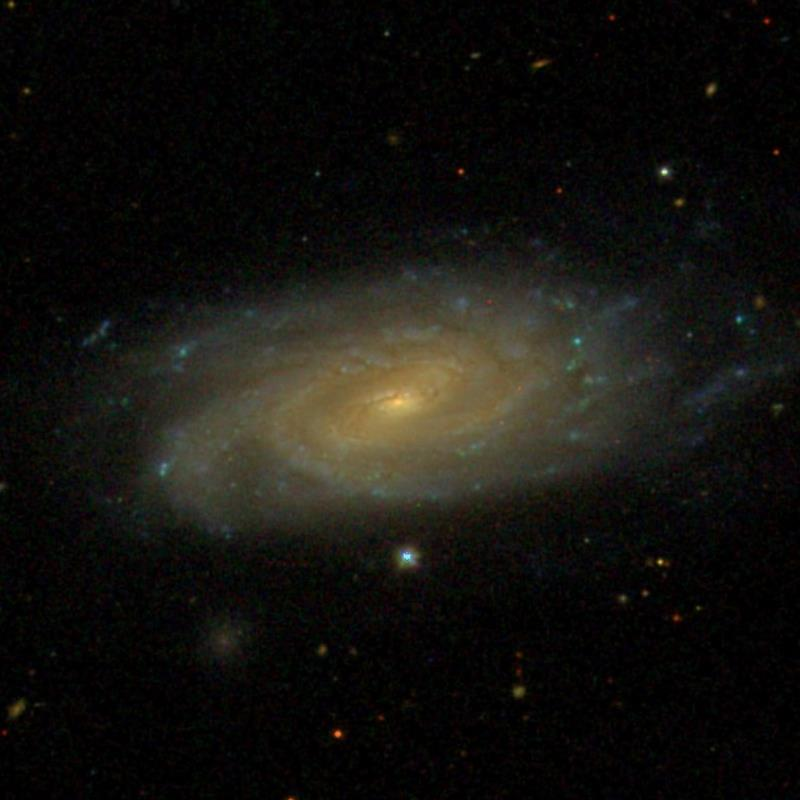
- NGC 1090 imaged by SDSS

Observation data (J2000 epoch)
- Constellation: Cetus
- Right ascension: 02^{h} 46^{m} 33.9^{s}
- Declination: −00° 14′ 49″
- Redshift: 2760 ± 4 km/s
- Distance: 124 million light-years
- Apparent magnitude (V): 12.5

Characteristics
- Type: SB(rs)bc
- Apparent size (V): 4.0′ × 1.7′

Other designations
- UGC 2247, PGC 10507

NGC 1090 is a barred spiral galaxy located in the constellation Cetus.

NGC 1090 has a pseudo inner ring. The disc has a very low surface brightness.

NGC 1090 is not part of a galaxy group, even though it appears close to NGC 1087, M77 (NGC 1068), NGC 1055, NGC 1073, and five other small irregular galaxies.

The distance to NGC 1090 is approximately 124 million light years and its diameter is about 144,000 light years.

== Supernovae ==
Two supernovae have been observed in NGC 1090:

- SN 1962K (type unknown, mag. 18.2) was discovered by Konrad Rudnicki on 3 August 1962.
- SN 1971T (type unknown, mag. 16) was discovered by Charles Kowal on 23 November 1971.
