= NGC 1087 =

Spiral galaxy in the constellation Cetus

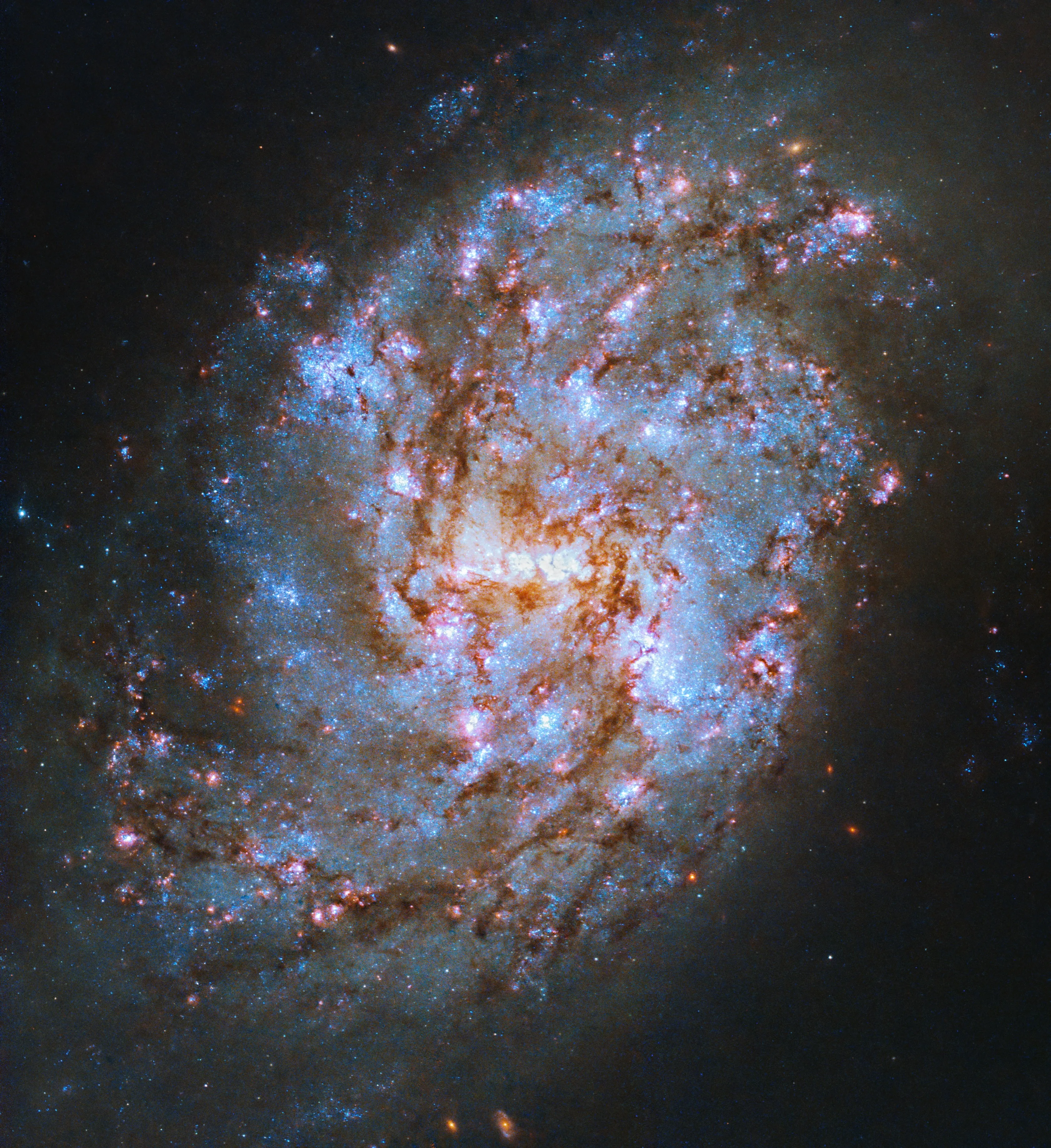
- NGC 1087 imaged by the Hubble Space Telescope

Observation data (J2000 epoch)
- Constellation: Cetus
- Right ascension: 02^{h} 46^{m} 25.2^{s}
- Declination: −00° 29′ 55″
- Redshift: 1517 ± 4 km/s
- Distance: 52 ±7Mly (15.85 ±2.24 Mpc)
- Apparent magnitude (V): 12.2g

Characteristics
- Type: SAB(rs)c
- Mass: 2.7 ±0.2 x 10^10 M_{☉}
- Apparent size (V): 3.12′ × 1.50′

Other designations
- UGC 2245, PGC 10496

NGC 1087, also known as UGC 2245 or PGC 10496, is an intermediate spiral galaxy located around 15.85 ±2.24 Mpc (52 ±7 million light years) away from Earth on the Constellation of Cetus. The galaxy has a mass of 2.7 ±0.2 x 10^{10} solar masses.

The galaxy was discovered in 1785 by the German-British astronomer William Herschel.

NGC 1087 lies near the small Messier 77 (squid galaxy) group, a group of galaxies that also includes NGC 936, NGC 1055, and NGC 1090. However, because of its distance, it is likely that NGC 1087 is not an actual group member. Even though it appears close to the galaxy NGC 1090, these two galaxies are not interacting and are considered to be isolated from one another. NGC 1087, along with NGC 1090, were originally thought to be members of the Cetus I galaxy group.

== Morphology ==
The galaxy has a diameter of approximately 87,000 light years. The galactic nucleus of NGC 1087 is extremely small. It has many irregular features in the surrounding disk of material. With the many strange features of NGC 1087, its true nature is still uncertain.

The stellar bar is an elongated bright white structure located at the center of the galaxy. Similar to the nucleus, the stellar bar is also very small when compared to the stellar bars of other more typical barred galaxies. Unlike most barred galaxies, the bar apparently has some new star-formation activity taking place. Near-infrared (NIR) observations using high-resolution telescopes such as the James Webb Space Telescope (JWST) with NIRCam is able to detect a hidden bar in NGC 1087.

The galaxy has multiple spiral arms that are defined more by the dark red dust lanes than by luminous matter. Overall, the disc has a very low surface brightness with a brightness of 1.4x10^{10} solar luminosity.

The galaxy also has an ovular distortion. The distortions dynamically cold nature makes it enhanced in carbon monoxide (CO).

== Supernova ==
One supernova has been observed in NGC 1087:

- SN 1995V (Type II, mag. 15) was discovered by Robert Evans on 1 August 1995.
