= NGC 2280 =

Spiral galaxy in the constellation Canis Major

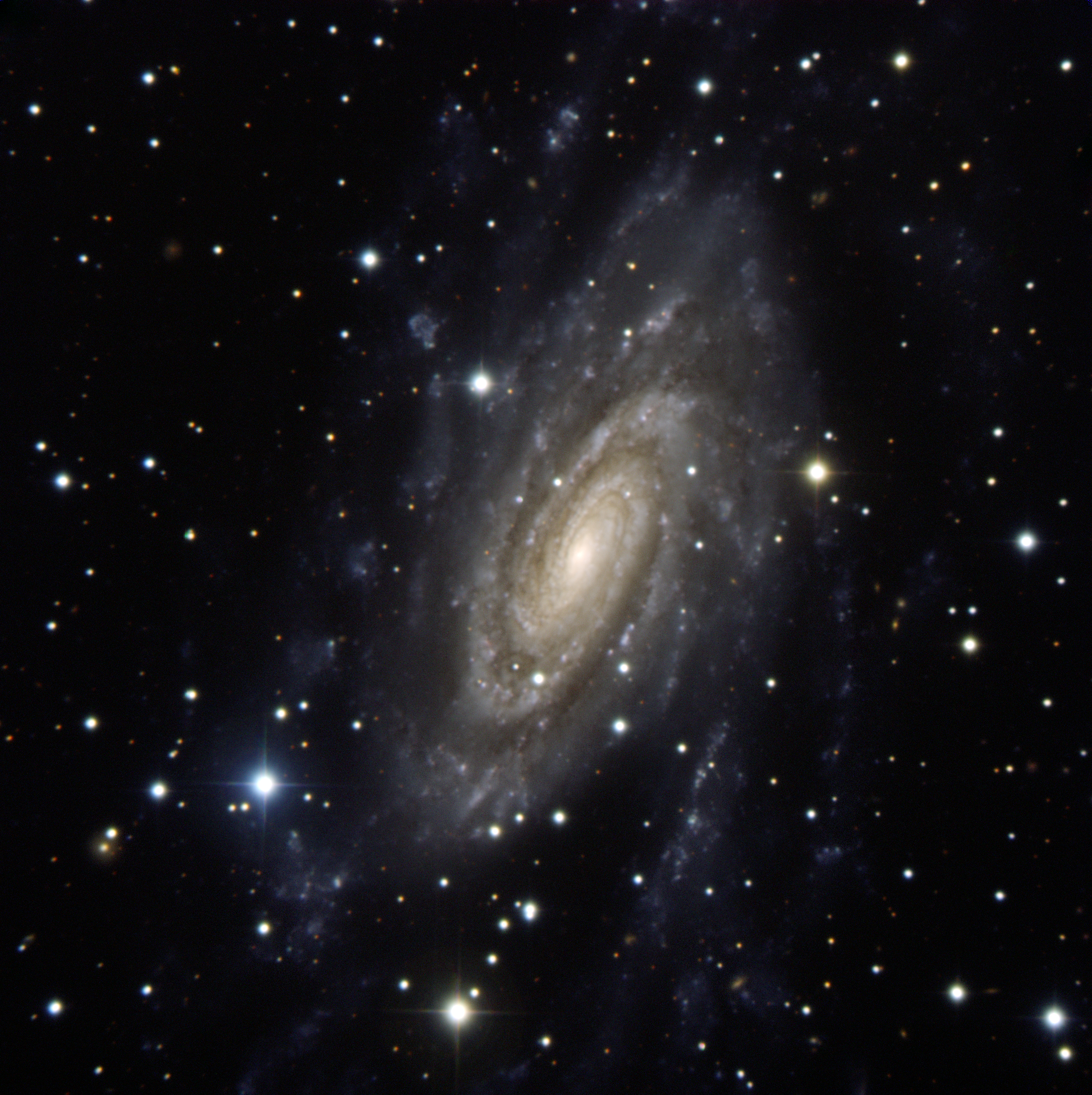
- NGC 2280 by the 3.6-metre telescope at ESO's La Silla Observatory

Observation data (J2000 epoch)
- Constellation: Canis Major
- Right ascension: 06^{h} 44^{m} 49.0984^{s}
- Declination: −27° 38′ 18.405″
- Redshift: 0.006334 +/- 0.000010
- Heliocentric radial velocity: 1899 ± 3 km/s
- Distance: 74.6 ± 16 Mly (22.9 ± 5.0 Mpc)
- Apparent magnitude (V): 10.5

Characteristics
- Type: SA(s)cd
- Apparent size (V): 6.3′ × 3.1′

Other designations
- ESO 427- G 002, AM 0642-273, IRAS 06428-2735, UGCA 131, MCG -05-16-020, PGC 19531

NGC 2280 is a spiral galaxy located in the constellation Canis Major. It is located at a distance of about 75 million light years from Earth, which, given its apparent dimensions, means that NGC 2280 is about 135,000 light years across. It was discovered by John Herschel on February 1, 1835.

== Characteristics ==
NGC 2280 has a small bright nucleus. The spiral arms emanate from the bulge and are narrow and of high surface magnitude in the inner part of the disk. At the outer disk the arms become broader and of lower surface magnitude and appear to have more knots. The east arm can be traced through ~540° while the west one fades after ~360°. The spiral pattern of the galaxy is undisturbed, with regular flow pattern and no evidence for a bar or oval distortion. In the nucleus of NGC 2280 lies a supermassive black hole whose mass is estimated to be between 4 and 15 million M_{☉} (10^{6.88 ± 0.31} M_{☉}) by measuring the galaxy's pitch angle.

== Supernova ==
One supernova has been observed in NGC 2280. SN 2001fz, a type II supernova, was discovered by the Beijing Astronomical Observatory Supernova Survey on November 15, 2001. It had a peak magnitude of 17.4.

== Nearby galaxies ==
NGC 2280 belongs to the NGC 2280 galaxy group, also known as LGG 138. Other members of the group are the possibly merging lenticular galaxies NGC 2292 and NGC 2293, NGC 2295, ESO 490−G010 and ESO 490−G045. Because of its large angular diameter, about one degree, the group was identified when redshift information were available, by Garcia et al. in 1993. Although there are some smaller galaxies near NGC 2280 that based on redshift could be its companions, there are no significant indications of recent interactions or tidal distortions, like warps. Gerard de Vaucouleurs had placed NGC 2280 in the same group with NGC 2139, NGC 2207, NGC 2217, and NGC 2223.

== See also ==
- List of NGC objects (2001–3000)
