= NGC 7213 =

Galaxy in the constellation Grus

- Image of NGC 7213

Observation data (J2000 epoch)
- Constellation: Grus
- Right ascension: 22^{h} 09^{m} 16.3^{s}
- Declination: −47° 09′ 59″
- Redshift: 0.005839 +/- 0.000019
- Heliocentric radial velocity: 1,750 ± 6 km/s
- Distance: 72 Mly (22 Mpc)
- Apparent magnitude (V): 10.1

Characteristics
- Type: SA(s)0^0
- Apparent size (V): 3.1′ × 2.8′
- Notable features: Seyfert galaxy, LINER

Other designations
- ESO 288- G043, AM 2206-472, PGC 68165

NGC 7213 is a lenticular galaxy located in the constellation Grus. It is located at a distance of circa 70 million light-years from Earth, which, given its apparent dimensions, means that NGC 7213 is about 75,000 light-years across. It was discovered by John Herschel on September 30, 1834. It is an active galaxy with characteristics between a type I Seyfert galaxy and LINER.

== Characteristics ==
The nucleus of NGC 7213 features activity and belongs to the low-luminosity active galactic nuclei (LLAGN). The optical spectrum features broad H-alpha lines and has similar characteristics to a type I Seyfert galaxy, however it is considerably less luminous than other similar galaxies. It also features [Ne V] λ3426, He II λ4686, [O II] λ3726, 3729, 7319, 7330, [O III] λ4363, 4959, and 5007 emission lines. However the intensity ratios of many of these lines is similar to a LINER. Observed in radio waves, NGC 7213 looks like a point-like source that could feature two jets that bend between one 1 arcsec (150 pc) and 10 arcsec (1.5 kpc). It is categorised as a radio-intermediate galaxy, lying between radio-quiet and radio-loud sources. The source of activity in the AGNs is a supermassive black hole (SMBH) lying at the centre of the galaxy. The mass of the SMBH at the centre of NGC 7213 is estimated to be between 8×10^{7} M_{☉} and 9.6+6.1
−4.1×10^{7} M_{☉} based on the mean velocity dispersion or (3-47) × 10^{6} (10^{6.83+0.84
−0.33}) M_{☉} based on the polarization of broad Hα emission.

NGC 7213 has been found to be a low-luminosity X-ray source. The 2-10 keV spectrum of NGC 7213 resembles the spectrum of Seyfert I galaxies, but also contains significant emission lines from FeXXV and FeXXVI, which are observed in LINERs and are not present in most classical Seyfert galaxies. Also, the soft X-ray spectrum of NGC 7213 features collisionally ionized thermal plasma, one more characteristic of LINERs. In addition, there is no X-ray emission detected that can be attributed to an accretion disk. Observations by NuSTAR at 3-79 keV showed no evidence for a Compton-reflected continuum. The observations suggest that the accretion disc is truncated in the inner region, with the black hole being fed via radiative-inefficient accretion flows.

The X-ray flux of NGC 7213 is fluctuating, presenting a sharp flare, larger than the others, in the 1980s with the flux reducing steadily after for more than 20 years. This flare showed a fast-rise-exponential-decay pattern and has been suggested to be caused by the tidal disruption of a main sequence star by the black hole at the centre of NGC 7213. Smaller scale flares are also observed. The emission variability is also observed in other wavelengths with a time lag. The lag is 24 ± 12 days for 8.4 GHz radio and 40 ± 13 days for the 4.8 GHz radio.

Surrounding the nucleus is a ring of starforming regions, lying at a radius of circa 20 arcseconds. Closer to the nucleus can be observed a dusty spiral pattern, with two arms, with the northwest arm being on the near side of the galaxy, and the southeast one to the far side. The ionised gas inflow rate towards the nucleus is estimated to be 0.2 M_{☉} per year. Although NGC 7213 appears undisturbed in visible light, it shows signs of having undergone a collision or merger when viewed at longer wavelengths, with disturbed patterns of ionized hydrogen including a filament of gas around 64,000 light-years long, itself being part of a larger HI tidal tail southwest of the nucleus.

== Nearby galaxies ==
NGC 7213 is the foremost galaxy in a galaxy group known as the NGC 7213 group. Other members of the group include IC 5170, IC 5181, NGC 7232, and NGC 7233. A bit further away lies the NGC 7144 group, which includes NGC 7144, NGC 7145, NGC 7151, and NGC 7155. These galaxies group are part of the Pavo-Indus cloud and the Grus cloud, which lie between the Local Supercluster and Pavo–Indus Supercluster.

== Gallery ==
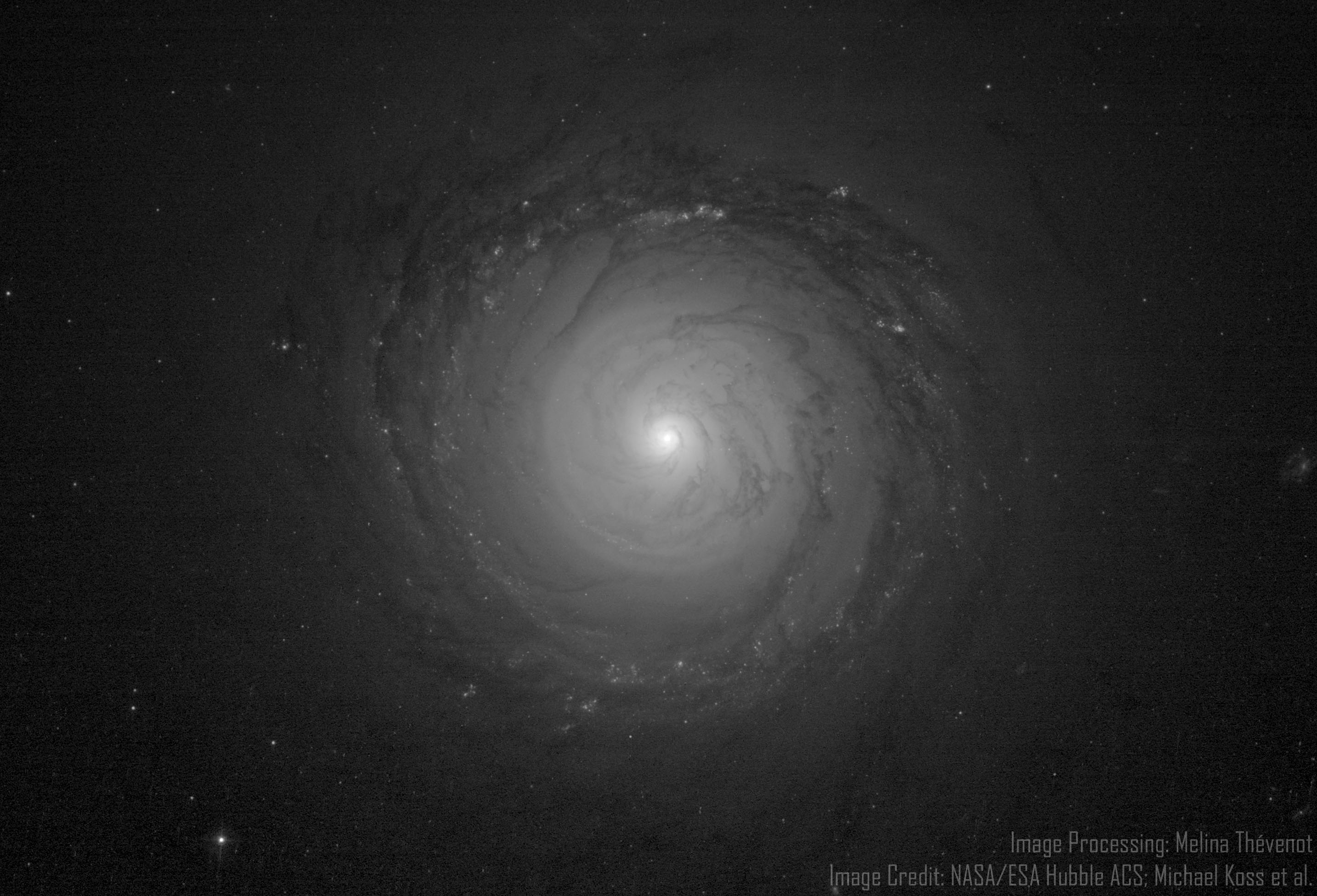
NGC 7213 imaged by Hubble Space Telescope

== See also ==
Other Seyfert galaxies include:

- Messier 77
- NGC 1106
- NGC 5128
