= IC 1011 =

Galaxy in the constellation of Virgo

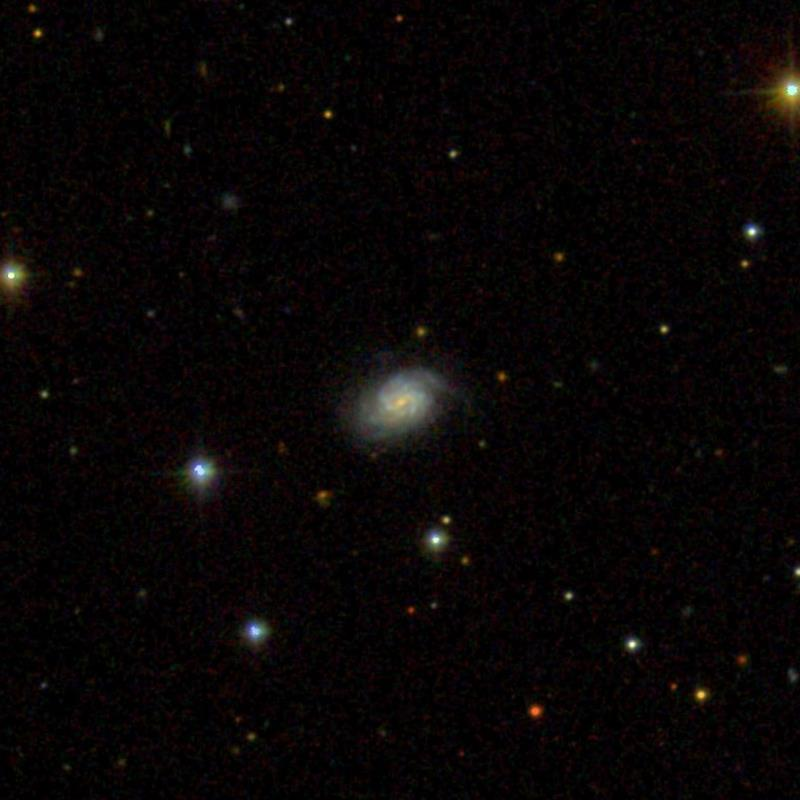
- SDSS image of IC 1011

Observation data (J2000 epoch)
- Constellation: Virgo
- Right ascension: 14^{h} 28^{m} 04.563^{s}
- Declination: 01° 00′ 22.87″

Characteristics
- Type: Sb d
- Apparent size (V): 0.741′ × 0.427′

Other designations
- PGC 51662, MCG +00-37-008, 2MASX J14280456+0100228, IRAS 14255+0113

IC 1011 is a spiral galaxy with apparent magnitude of 14.7, and with a redshift of z=0.02564 (SIMBAD) or 0.025703 (NASA), yielding a distance of 100 to 120 megaparsecs. Its light takes 349.5 million years to reach Earth. IC 1011's calculated age is approximately 12.95 billion years. The IC designation comes from the Index Catalogue.

== See also ==
- Lists of galaxies
- IC 3447
