= CEERS-2112 =

Most distant barred spiral galaxy observed to date

Observation data (J2000 epoch)
- Constellation: Boötes
- Right ascension: 14^{h} 19^{m} 55.18^{s}
- Declination: +52° 59′ 31.1″
- Redshift: 3.03
- Heliocentric radial velocity: 986,317 km/h (612,869 mph)
- Galactocentric velocity: 986,440 km/h (612,950 mph)
- Distance: 11.7 billion ly (3.6 billion pc) (light travel distance); ~20 billion ly (6.1 billion pc) (comoving distance)

Characteristics
- Type: SBbc
- Mass: 3.9×10^{9} M_{☉}
- Size: 30 kly (9.2 kpc)
- Apparent size (V): 0.009 x 0.005 moa

Other designations
- CANDELS J141955.18+525931.0, SYM2017 30172

CEERS-2112 is one of the most distant barred spiral galaxies observed as of 2023. The light observed from the galaxy was emitted when the universe was only 2.1 billion years old. It was determined to be similar in mass to the Milky Way.

== Observations ==
The galaxy is located in the Extended Groth Strip cosmological field and it was identified as a barred spiral galaxy thanks to the observations of the NIRCam instrument onboard the James Webb Space Telescope. These observations were made in June 2022 as part of the Cosmic Evolution Early Release Science (CEERS) survey and are publicly available for the general community.

== Morphology ==
CEERS-2112 is a barred spiral galaxy, resembling the structure of the Milky Way. It presents a concentration of stars moving on very elliptical orbits in its central region, which appears as an elongated structure (stellar bar), from which two faint spiral arms develop. In the local Universe, about 70% of galaxies show this appearance, which is quite rare in the early Universe, where the percentage diminishes to about 5% at redshift z > 2.

== Stellar mass ==
The galaxy has a stellar mass of 3.9 billion times that of the Sun, comparable with that of the Milky Way 11.7 billion years ago.
