= NGC 7640 =

Galaxy in the constellation of Andromeda

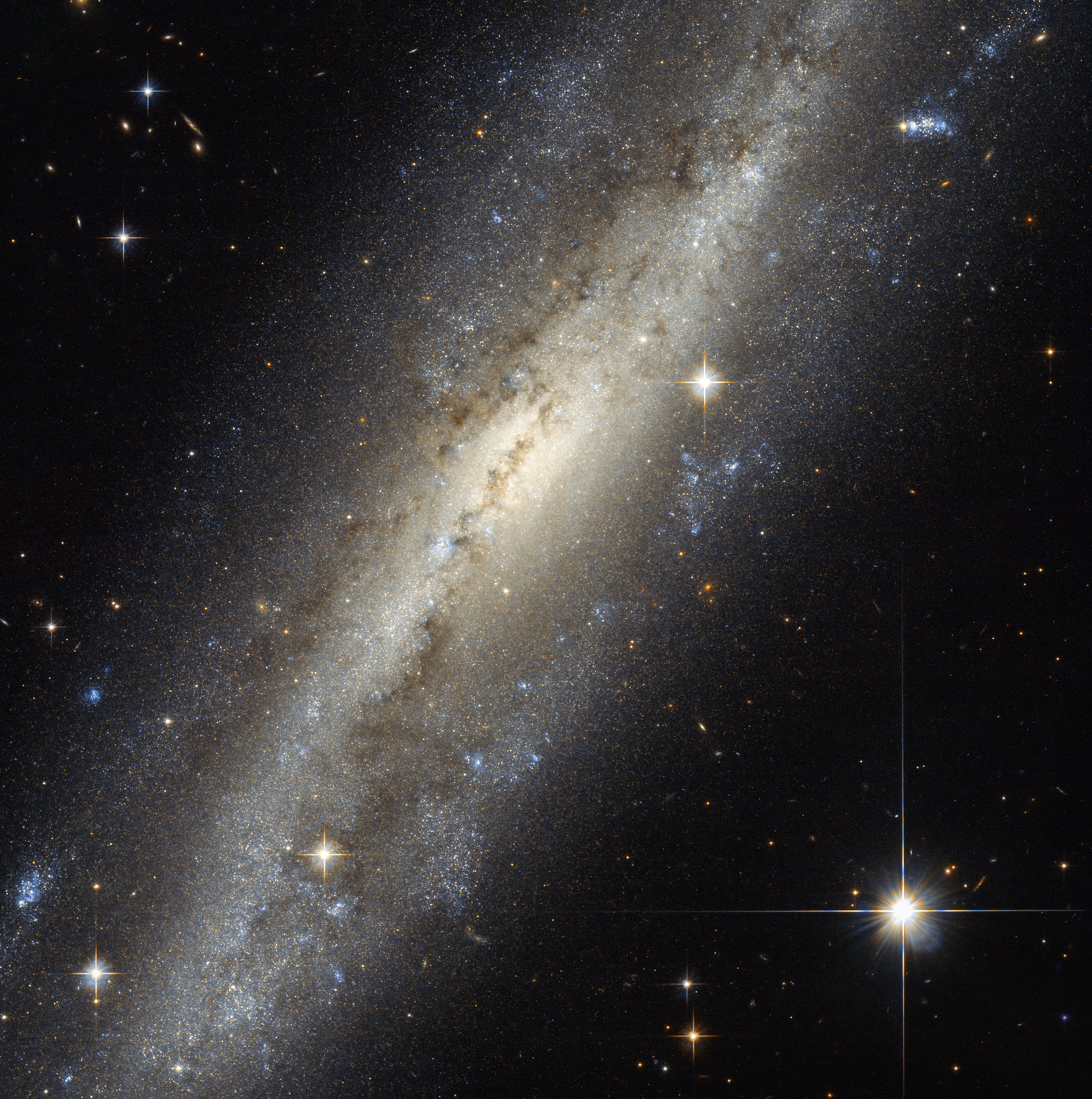
- NGC 7640 (photographed by the Hubble Space Telescope

Observation data (J2000 epoch)
- Constellation: Andromeda
- Right ascension: 23^{h} 22^{m} 06.58^{s}
- Declination: +40° 50′ 43.5″
- Redshift: 0.001231 ± 0.000004
- Heliocentric radial velocity: +369 ± 1 km/s
- Distance: 29.72 ± 0.5 Mly
- Apparent magnitude (V): 11.1
- Absolute magnitude (V): 11.86

Characteristics
- Type: SB(s)c
- Apparent size (V): 10.5′ × 2′

Other designations
- NGC 7640

NGC 7640 is a barred spiral galaxy in the constellation of Andromeda. Discovered on October 17, 1786 by the English astronomer William Herschel. The galaxy has an 11th visible magnitude and is located about 30 million light-years from Earth.

NGC 7640 might not look much like a spiral, but this is due to the orientation (edge on) of the galaxy with respect to an observer on Earth. There is evidence that this galaxy has experienced an interaction with another galaxy in the (astronomically) recent past.
