= NGC 1086 =

Galaxy in the constellation Perseus

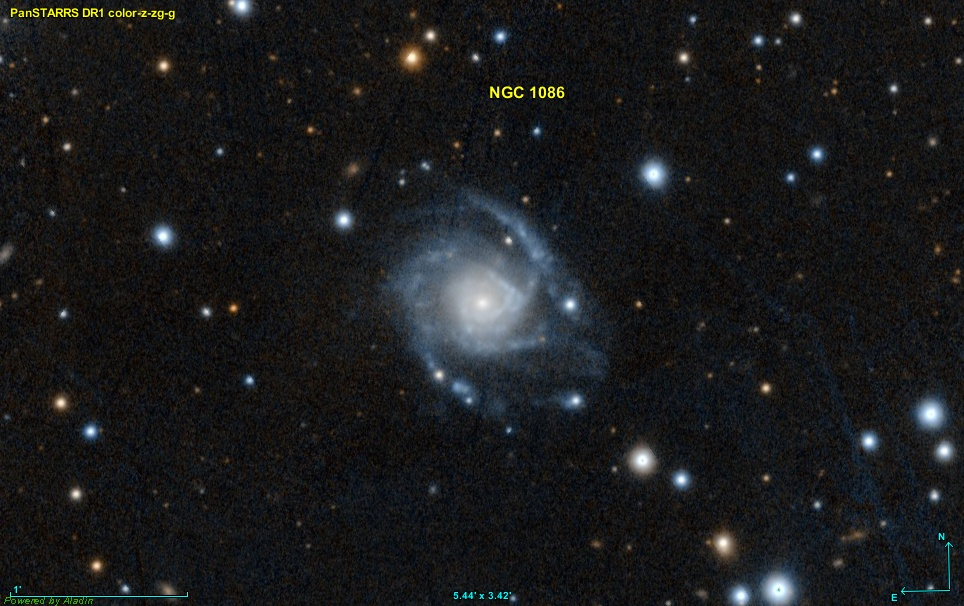
- The spiral galaxy NGC 1086

Observation data (J2000 epoch)
- Constellation: Perseus
- Right ascension: 02^{h} 47^{m} 56.3296^{s}
- Declination: +41° 14′ 46.916″
- Redshift: 0.013479
- Heliocentric radial velocity: 4041 ± 5 km/s
- Distance: 185.1 ± 13.0 Mly (56.76 ± 3.98 Mpc)
- Group or cluster: NGC 1086 Group (LGG 78)
- Apparent magnitude (V): 12.8

Characteristics
- Type: Scd?
- Size: ~104,200 ly (31.96 kpc) (estimated)
- Apparent size (V): 1.5′ × 1.0′

Other designations
- IRAS 02447+4102, 2MASX J02475638+4114474, UGC 2258, MCG +07-06-071, PGC 10587, CGCG 539-101

NGC 1086 is a spiral galaxy in the constellation of Perseus. Its velocity with respect to the cosmic microwave background is 3848 ± 14 km/s, which corresponds to a Hubble distance of 56.76 ± 3.98 Mpc (~185 million light-years). It was discovered by American astronomer Lewis Swift on 20 August 1885.

== Supernova ==
One supernova has been observed in NGC 1086: SN 2023rix (Type II, mag. 18.2099) was discovered by the Zwicky Transient Facility on 5 September 2023.

== NGC 1086 Group ==
NGC 1086 is the largest galaxy of the four member NGC 1086 Group (also known as LGG 78). The other three galaxies are: NGC 1106, UGC 2349, and UGC 2350.

== See also ==
- List of NGC objects (1001–2000)
