= NGC 5398 =

Galaxy in the constellation Centaurus

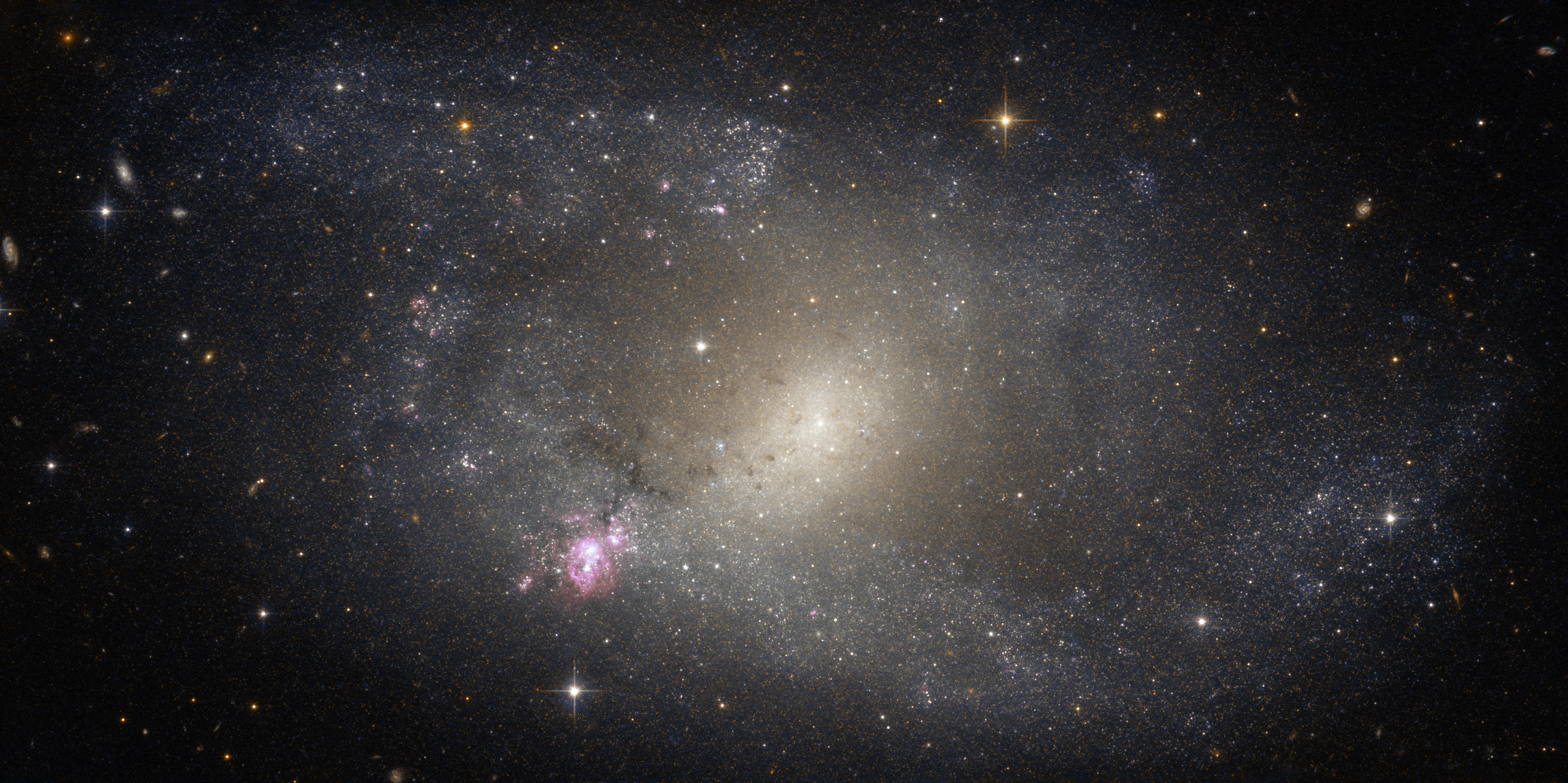
- NGC 5398 imaged by the Hubble Space Telescope; Tol 89 is the pale red patch to the lower left of center

Observation data (J2000 epoch)
- Constellation: Centaurus
- Right ascension: 14^{h} 01^{m} 21.555^{s}
- Declination: −33° 03′ 49.62″
- Heliocentric radial velocity: 1,219 km/s
- Galactocentric velocity: 1,085 km/s
- Distance: 27.8 Mly (8.5 Mpc)
- Apparent magnitude (V): 12.6

Characteristics
- Type: SB(rs)dm
- Apparent size (V): 2.8′ × 1.7′ (D_{25})

Other designations
- IRAS 13584-3249, NGC 5398, UGCA 379, LEDA 49923, MCG -05-33-037, PGC 49923

NGC 5398 is a barred spiral galaxy in the southern constellation of Centaurus. It was discovered June 3, 1836 by John Herschel. Distance estimates range from 5.39 Mpc to 18.30 Mpc. The tip of the red-giant branch method yields a distance of 11.6 Mpc, while the Tully–Fisher relation shows values of around 8.5 Mpc. It is receding with a heliocentric radial velocity of 1,219 km/s.

The morphological class of NGC 5398 is SB(rs)dm, indicating this is a spiral galaxy with an inner bar (SB) and incomplete ring (rs) structures, plus broken, irregular spiral arms (dm). The galactic plane is inclined at an angle of 53° to the line of sight from the Earth. The oval outline of the disk has an angular size of 2.8′ × 1.7′ at a limiting magnitude of 25, with the major axis aligned along a position angle of 172°.

At the southwestern end of the bar lies a giant H II region (GHR) designated Tol 89. It spans a region of 1.7 × 1.2 kpc with an absolute magnitude of −14.8 in the B (blue) band, making it "one of the most impressive GHRs known". This is the only large site in NGC 5398 that is undergoing star formation, and it suggests that NGC 5398 is engaged in some form of interaction.

== See also ==
- NGC 4618 - a similar galaxy
- NGC 4625 - a similar galaxy
