= NGC 1055 =

Spiral galaxy in the constellation Cetus

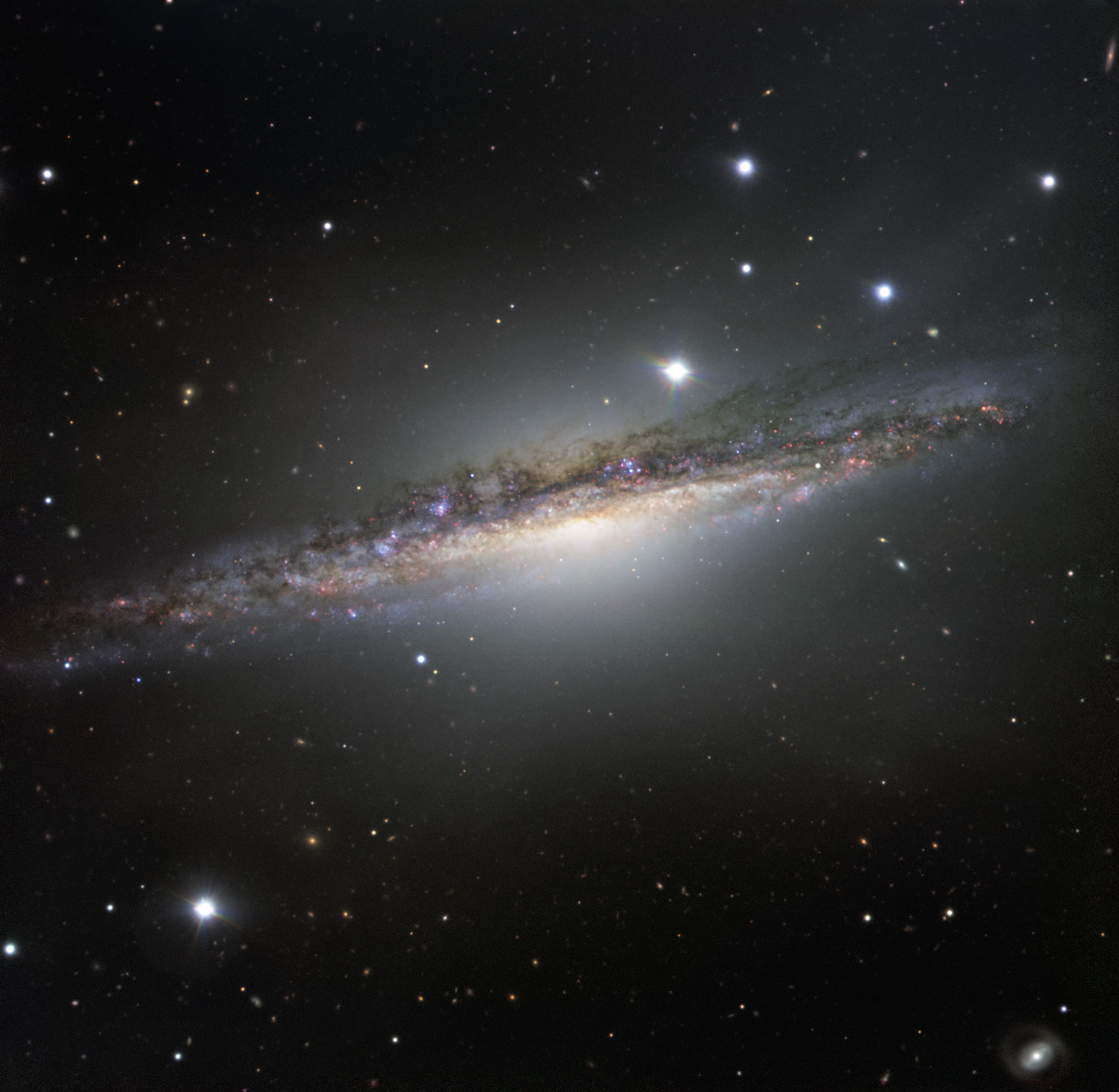
- Very Large Telescope image of NGC 1055

Observation data (J2000 epoch)
- Constellation: Cetus
- Right ascension: 02^{h} 41^{m} 45.2292^{s}
- Declination: +00° 26′ 35.988″
- Redshift: 0.003322±0.000002
- Heliocentric radial velocity: 996±1 km/s
- Distance: 52 Mly (16 Mpc)
- Apparent magnitude (V): 10.6

Characteristics
- Type: SBb: II-III: spindle
- Size: ~114,400 ly (35.06 kpc) (estimated)
- Apparent size (V): 7.6′ × 2.7′

Other designations
- IRAS 02391+0013, UGC 2173, MCG +00-07-081, PGC 10208, CGCG 388-095

NGC 1055 is an edge-on spiral galaxy located in the constellation Cetus. The galaxy has a prominent nuclear bulge crossed by a wide, knotty, dark lane of dust and gas. The spiral arm structure appears to be elevated above the galaxy's plane and obscures the upper half of the bulge. It was discovered by German-British astronomer William Herschel on December 18, 1783, from his home in Slough, England.

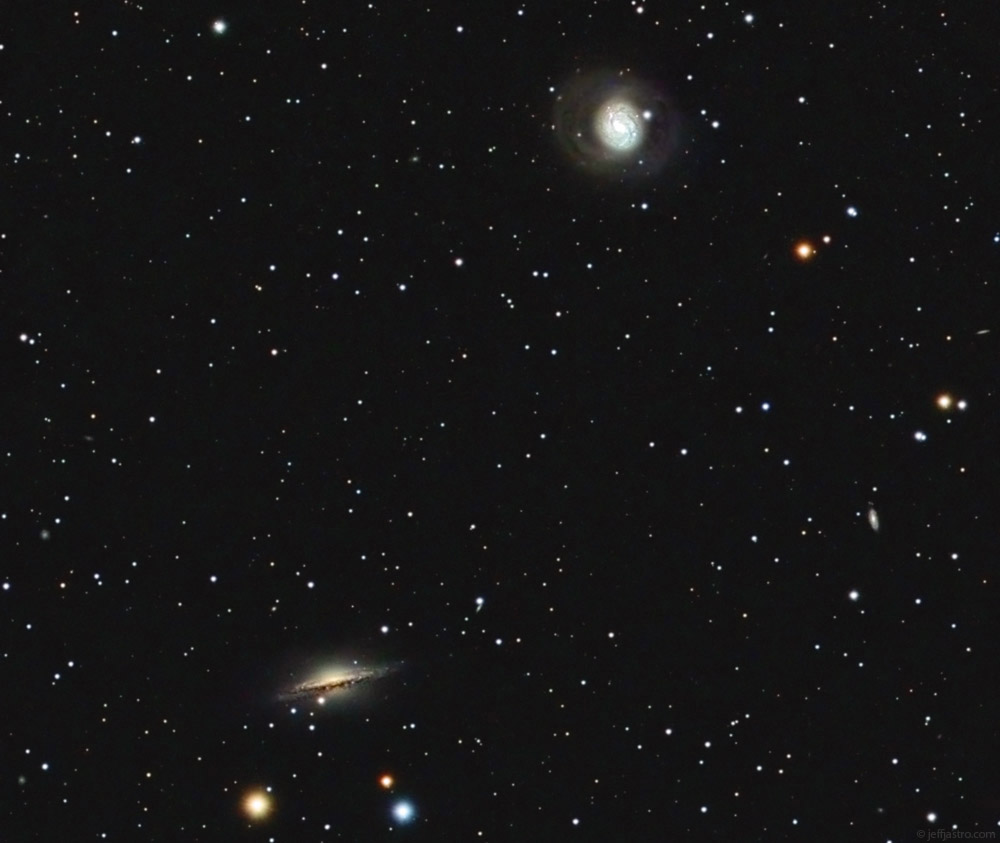
NGC 1055, bottom, and companion galaxy M77, top, the two largest galaxies of a small galaxy group

NGC 1055 is a binary system together with the bright spiral galaxy M77 (NGC 1068). These two are the largest galaxies of a small galaxy group that also includes NGC 1073, and five other small irregular galaxies.

NGC 1087, NGC 1090, and NGC 1094 appear close, but they simply appear in the field of view and are background galaxies.

Based on the published redshift, (Hubble Constant of 62 km/s per Mpc) a rough distance estimate for NGC 1055 is 52 million light-years, with a diameter of about 114,400 light-years. The separation between NGC 1055 and M77 is about 7 million light-years.

NGC 1055 is a bright infrared and radio source, particularly in the wavelength for warm carbon monoxide. Astronomers believe that this results from unusually active star formation. It most likely has a transitional nucleus, however, there is a small chance that it could be a LINER.

NGC 1055 is a member of a galaxy group known as LGG 73, which contains 7 galaxies, including NGC 1068, NGC 1073, UGCA 44, UGC 2302, UGC 2275 and UGC 2162.

== See also ==
- List of NGC objects (1001–2000)
