= NGC 936 =

Galaxy in the constellation Cetus

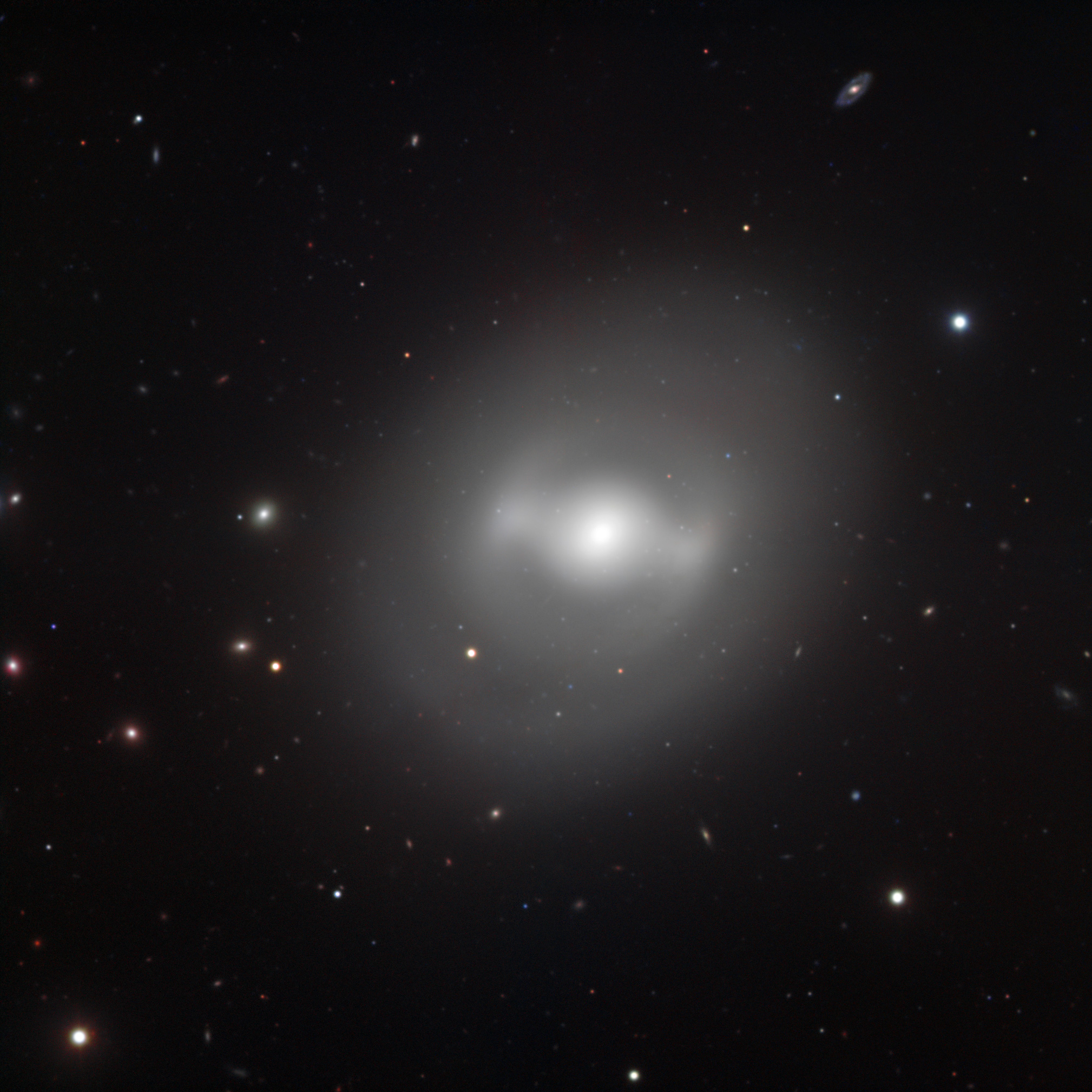
- NGC 936 by the Very Large Telescope of ESO.

Observation data (J2000 epoch)
- Constellation: Cetus
- Right ascension: 02^{h} 27^{m} 37.4^{s}
- Declination: −01° 09′ 22″
- Redshift: 1,430±4 km/s
- Distance: 67.7 ± 19.7 Mly (20.8 ± 6.0 Mpc)
- Apparent magnitude (V): 10.2

Characteristics
- Type: SB(rs)0+
- Apparent size (V): 4.7′ × 4.1′

Other designations
- UGC 1929, PGC 9359

NGC 936 is a barred lenticular galaxy in the constellation Cetus. It is at a distance of about 60 million light-years away from Earth. Its nucleus and prominent bar have high surface brightness. Because of the shape of the prominent bar, the nucleus and the ring of stars at the end of the barrel, the galaxy has been compared with the shape of a TIE fighter, from the Star Wars universe, and thus NGC 936 has been named Darth Vader’s Galaxy, Darth Vader's Fighter, or Darth Vader's Starfighter. By measuring the radial velocity of the disc, Kormendy found in 1986 that the disc is stable, which is the reason why it is so smooth.

It was discovered by William Herschel on 6 January 1785, who classified it as a planetary nebula, because of its round shape. One supernova (SN 2003gs) has been observed in NGC 936 and was typed as a peculiar Type Ia supernova, characterized by its fast evolution. SN 2003gs peaked at magnitude 14.

NGC 936 forms a pair with the spiral galaxy NGC 941, at 12.6' separation, however, the two galaxies do not interact. This galaxy group (the NGC 936 group) also includes the galaxies NGC 955, UGC 01945 and IC 225. The group is associated with Messier 77 group.

== Gallery ==
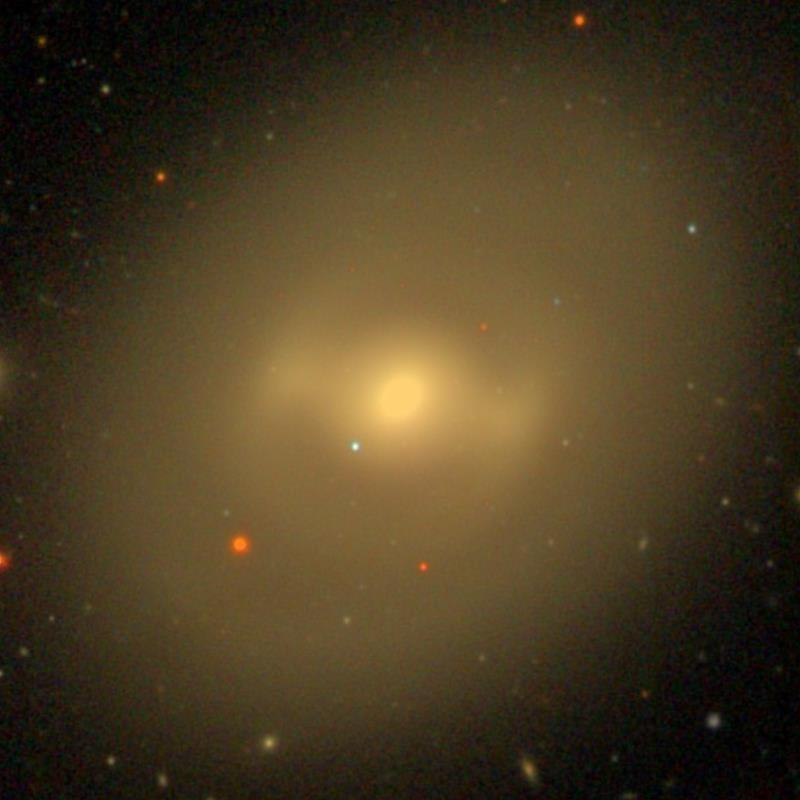
NGC 936 (SDSS DR14)
