= IC 5201 =

Barred spiral galaxy in the constellation of Grus

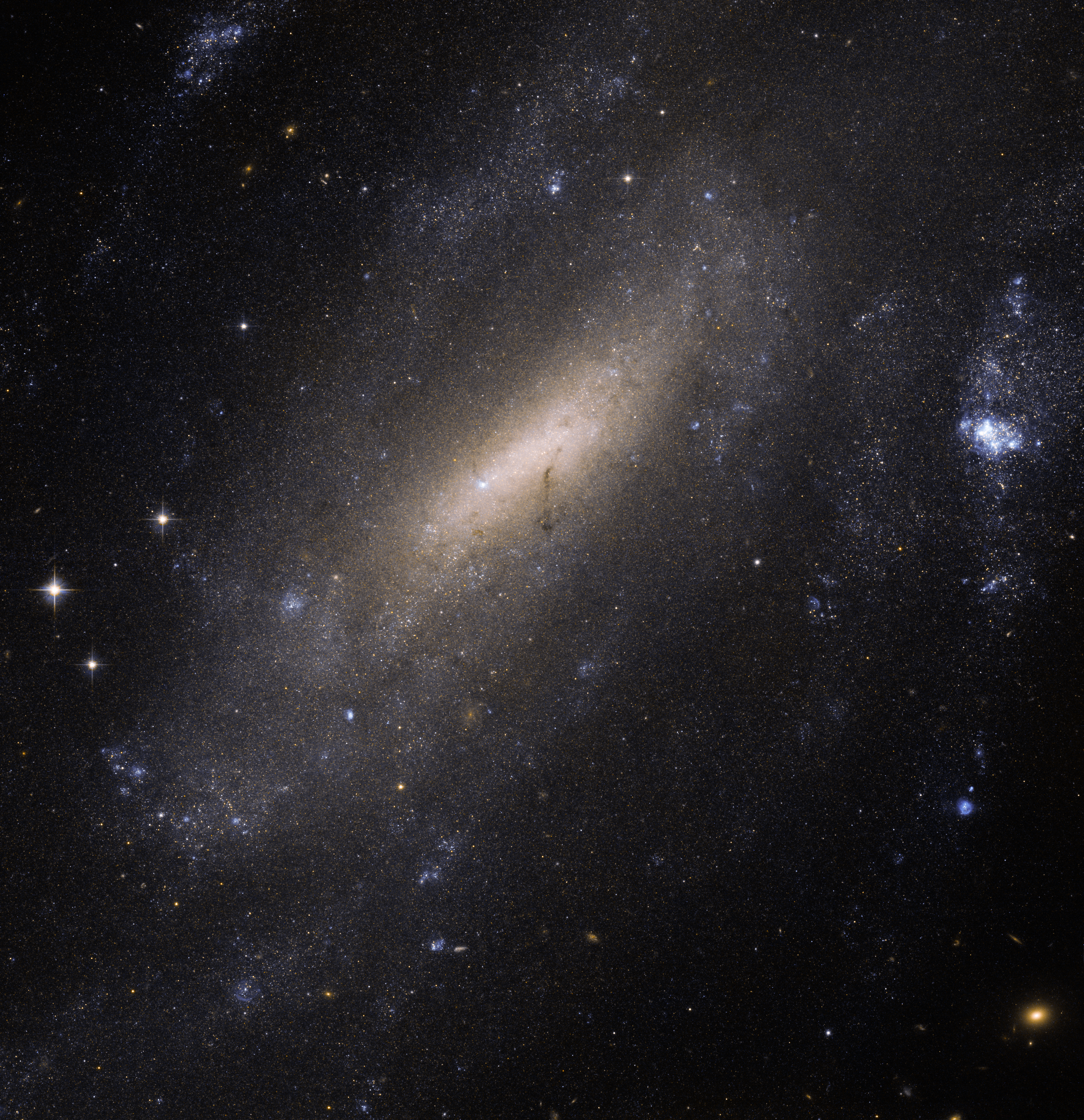
- The central area of IC 5201 imaged by the Hubble Space Telescope

Observation data (J2000 epoch)
- Constellation: Grus
- Right ascension: 22^{h} 20^{m} 57.4^{s}
- Declination: −46° 02′ 09″
- Redshift: 0.003052 ± 0.000007
- Heliocentric radial velocity: 915 ± 2 km/s
- Distance: 36.4 ± 17.6 Mly (11.2 ± 5.4 Mpc)
- Apparent magnitude (V): 10.8

Characteristics
- Type: SB(s)cd
- Apparent size (V): 8.5′ × 3.9′

Other designations
- ESO 289-G018, PGC 68618

IC 5201 is a barred spiral galaxy located in the constellation Grus. It is located at a distance of about 35 million light years from Earth, which, given its apparent dimensions, means that IC 5201 is about 90,000 light years across. It was discovered by Joseph Lunt in 1900.

IC 5201 is characterised by its bright bar, that measures 0.6 × 0.16 arcminutes. The galaxy has multiple thin arms which contain a large number of HII regions, where new stars are born. The largest of these regions have diameter about 5 arcseconds. The galaxy has been found to have HII region activity in its nucleus. The total star formation rate of the galaxy is estimated to be 1.7 M_{☉} per year. The galaxy is close enough so as its stars can be resolved. The brightest of them have apparent magnitude about 21.5. One ultra-luminous X-ray source has been detected in the galaxy.

IC 5201 is characterised as an isolated galaxy. Despite the fact IC 5201 does not belong to a galaxy group, it is the largest galaxy in an area of the universe where lie other galaxies too, like NGC 7462.

== Supernova ==
One supernova has been observed in IC 5201: SN 1978G. It was first reported by J. C. Blades, of the Anglo-Australian Observatory, and R. E. Griffiths, of Center for Astrophysics, on November 24.5 UTC, with apparent magnitude at discovery 13.5. The supernova was detected in its early stages. Spectroscopic observations revealed it was a Type II supernova. It was located 1'.6 west and 0'.7 north of the nucleus.
