= NGC 941 =

Spiral galaxy in the constellation Cetus

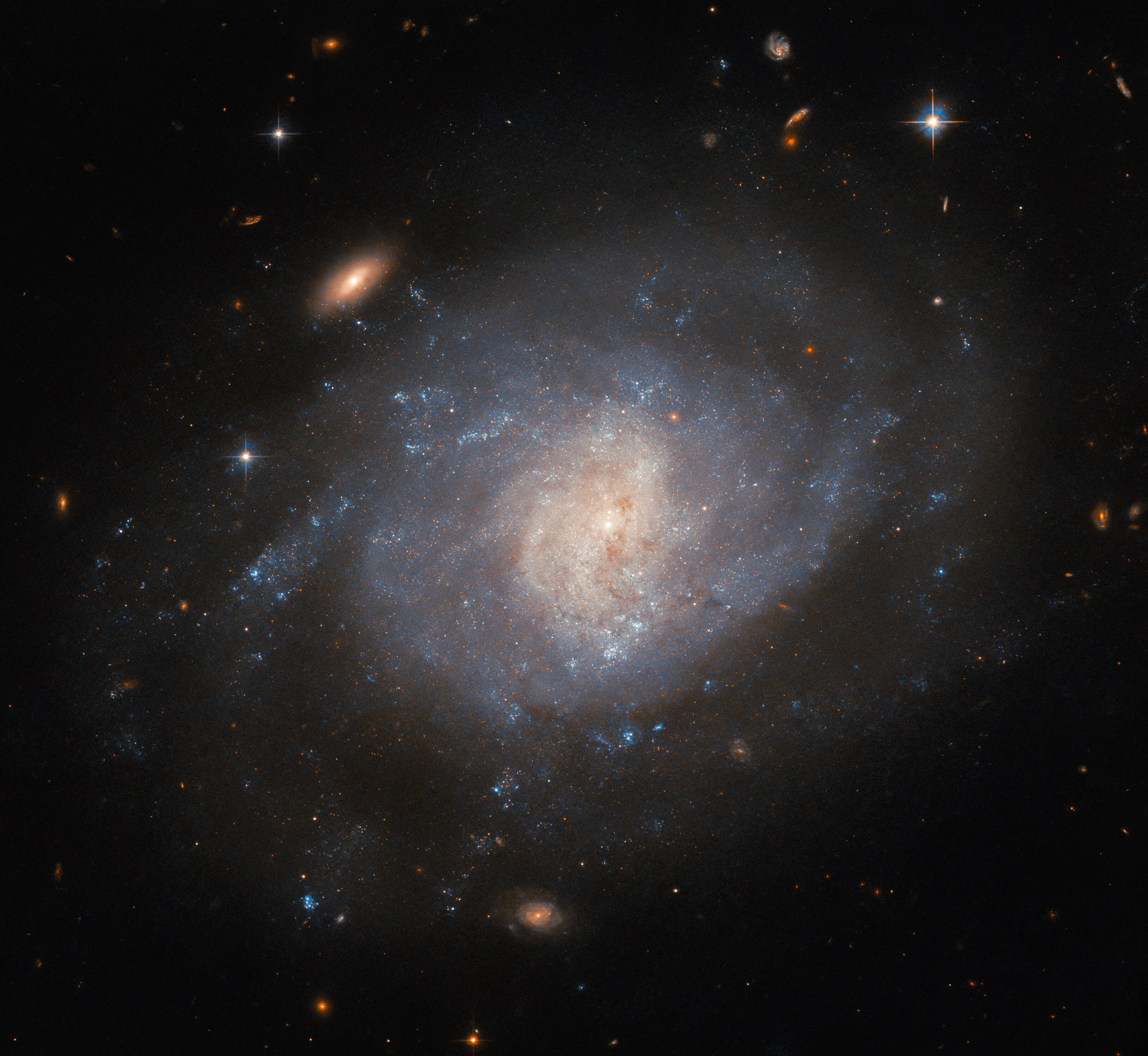
- NGC 941 imaged by the Hubble Space Telescope

Observation data (J2000 epoch)
- Constellation: Cetus
- Right ascension: 02^{h} 28^{m} 27.847^{s}
- Declination: −01° 09′ 05.61″
- Redshift: 0.005398
- Heliocentric radial velocity: 1613.8 km/s
- Distance: 54.9 Mly (16.83 Mpc)
- Apparent magnitude (V): 12.20
- Apparent magnitude (B): 12.8
- Absolute magnitude (V): −19.1

Characteristics
- Type: SAB(rs)c

Other designations
- UGC 1954, MCG +00-07-022, PGC 9414

NGC 941 is an intermediate spiral galaxy in the constellation Cetus. It is an estimated 16.83 MPc (55 million light-years) from the Milky Way and has a diameter of approximately 55,000 light years. The galaxies NGC 926, NGC 934, NGC 936, NGC 955 are located in the same sky area. NGC 941 was discovered by German-British astronomer William Herschel on 6 January 1785.

The morphological classification of NGC 941 is SAB(rs)c, indicating a spiral galaxy with a weak bar structure (SAB), an incomplete inner ring (RS), and moderately wound spiral arms (c).

== Supernova ==
One supernova has been observed in NGC 941.

- SN 2005ad (Type II, mag. 17.4) was discovered by Kōichi Itagaki on 6 February 2005.
