= NGC 2293 =

Galaxy in the constellation Canis Major

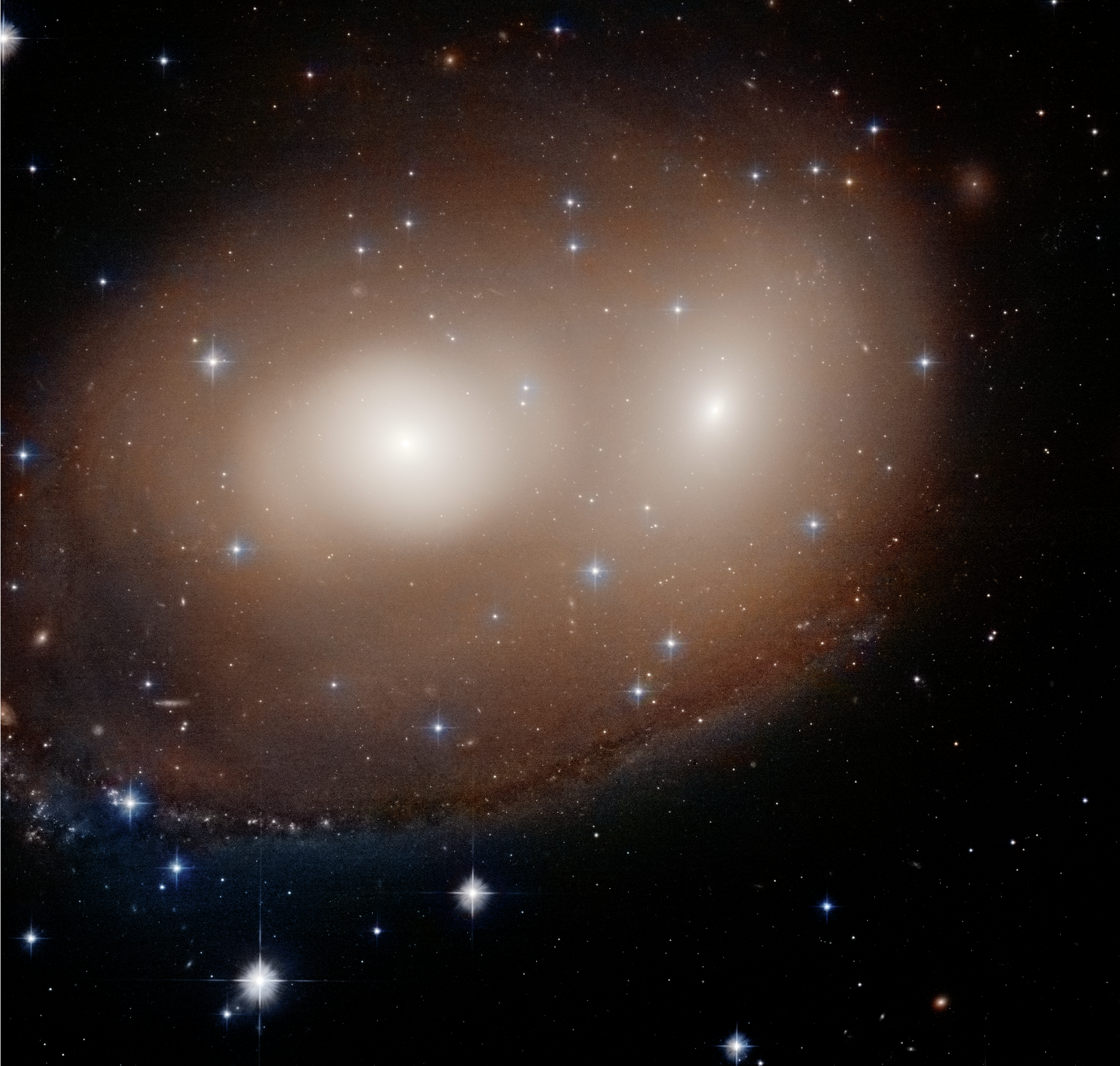
- NGC 2292 (right) and NGC 2293 (left) by the Hubble Space Telescope

Observation data (J2000 epoch)
- Constellation: Canis Major
- Right ascension: 06^{h} 47^{m} 42.9^{s}
- Declination: −26° 45′ 16″
- Redshift: 0.006795 ± 0.000020
- Heliocentric radial velocity: 2037 ± 6 km/s
- Distance: 107 ± 49 Mly (32.9 ± 15.0 Mpc)
- Apparent magnitude (V): 11.2

Characteristics
- Type: SAB(s)0+ pec
- Apparent size (V): 4.2′ × 3.3′
- Notable features: Interacts with NGC 2292

Other designations
- ESO 490-IG 049, VV 178a, MCG -04-16-023, PGC 19619

NGC 2293 is a lenticular galaxy located in the constellation Canis Major. It is located at a distance of circa 100 million light years from Earth, which, given its apparent dimensions, means that NGC 2293 is about 160,000 light years across. It was discovered by John Herschel on January 20, 1835. NGC 2293 forms a pair with NGC 2292 and has an HI ring that surrounds both galaxies.

The orange color and the bright center of the galaxies gives them a resemblance to carved pumpkins on Halloween.

== Characteristics ==
NGC 2293 is a lenticular galaxy with hints of a spiral structure. The old stars that make it give the galaxy an orange color. Located 0.8 arcminutes away from NGC 2292 lies NGC 2293. Both galaxies appear to share a common envelope and a complete ring of neutral hydrogen gas (HI) has been found to encircle both galaxies. The ring apparently has a color change to the southwestern view, that has been attributed to the presence of star formation. On the other hand, there is a marked absence of HI near the centre of the two galaxies. The total HI mass is 0.75×10^{9} M_{☉}.

It is possible that the ring is the result of an ongoing merger between the two galaxies, that would result in a giant elliptical galaxy. Various models have been suggested for the formation of the ring. The most likely model is the collision between one of the two galaxies and one more galaxy that swept gas away, with the star formation region on the ring been created by a density wave or it is a population that was stripped by the intruder galaxy. It has not been ruled out that the positioning is a projection effect of two galaxies separated by a few million light years.

Based on far infrared observations there is an extensive amount of cold dust at the pair, with temperature 13 K, which is lower than dust temperatures found in spiral and interacting galaxies. The temperature indicates however that it is not of primordial origin.

== Nearby galaxies ==
NGC 2292/2293 pair belongs to a galaxy group known as LGG 138. Other members of the group are the spiral galaxy NGC 2280, NGC 2295, ESO 490−G010 and ESO 490−G045. Because of its large angular diameter, about one degree, the group was identified when redshift information were available, by Garcia et al. in 1993.
