= NGC 1106 =

Galaxy in the constellation Perseus

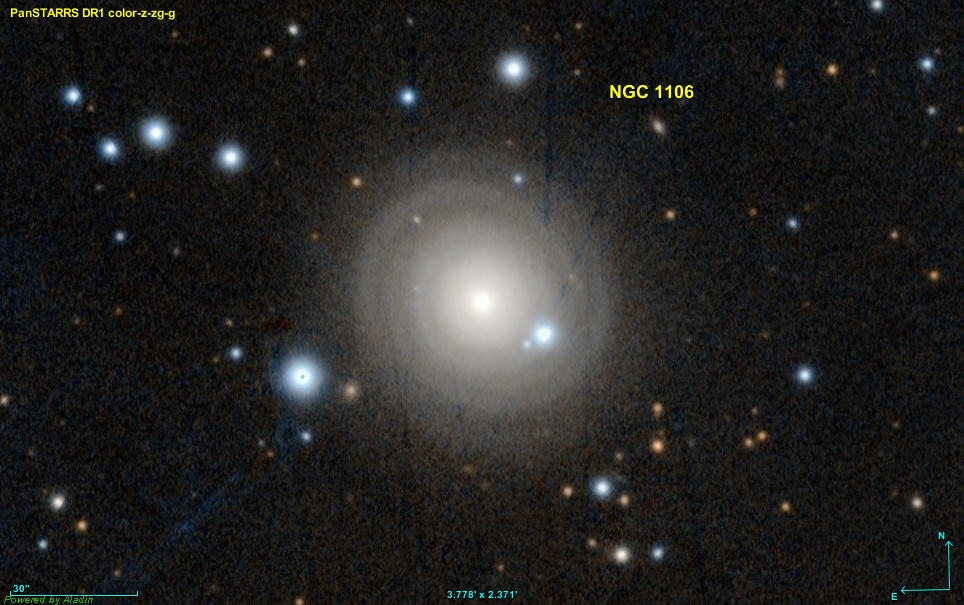
- NGC 1106

Observation data (J2000 epoch)
- Right ascension: 02^{h} 50^{m} 40.51^{s}
- Declination: +41° 40′ 17.4″
- Redshift: 0.014467 ± 0.000063
- Heliocentric radial velocity: 4337 ± 19 km/s
- Distance: ~199 ± 14 · 10^{6} Mly (61.0 ± 4.3 Mpc)
- Apparent magnitude (V): 12.5
- Apparent magnitude (B): 13.5
- Surface brightness: 12.7 mag/arcmin^{2}

Characteristics
- Apparent size (V): 1.30 x 1.0 arcmin

Other designations
- UGC 2322, MCG +07-06-076, CGCG 539-112, PGC 10792, IRAS 02474+4127

NGC 1106 is a lenticular, non-barred spiral galaxy with considerable structure (type SA0^+), located in the constellation Perseus. It was discovered by astronomer John Herschel on 18 September 1828.

== Characteristics ==
In 2016, astronomers confirmed NGC 1106 contains a Compton-thick active galactic nucleus, after extensive analysis of the galaxy's X-ray spectra. Due to the AGN in its center, it's also classified as a type II Seyfert galaxy, meaning it has the characteristic bright core of a Seyfert galaxy, as well as appearing bright when viewed at infrared wavelengths.

== Star formation ==
A study released in 2022 detected active star formation in NGC 1106. The research involved the use of far-ultraviolet and mid-infrared analysis, both techniques are extensively used as star formation rate tracers.

== NGC 1086 Group ==
NGC 1106 is a member of the NGC 1086 Group (also known as LGG 78). The other three galaxies are: NGC 1086, UGC 2349, and UGC 2350.

== See also ==
Other Seyfert galaxies include:

- Messier 77
- NGC 7213
- NGC 5128
