= IC 3447 =

Type Sc barred spiral galaxy in constellation Virgo

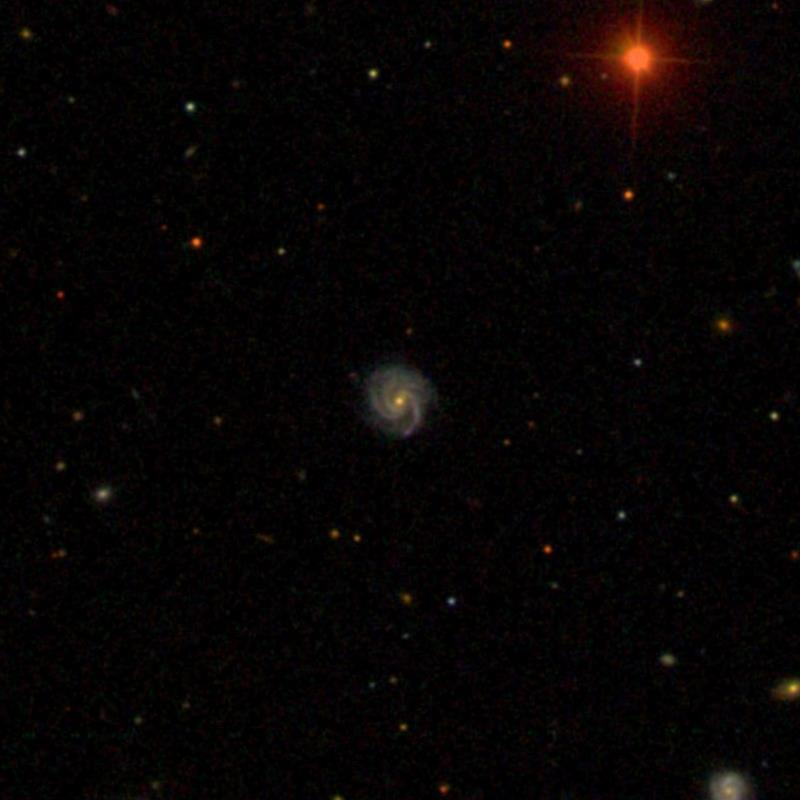
- IC 3447 taken by SDSS

Observation data (J2000 epoch)
- Constellation: Virgo
- Right ascension: 12h 31m 17.90s
- Declination: +10d 40m 48.59s
- Redshift: 0.092479
- Heliocentric radial velocity: 27,682 km/s
- Distance: 1.273 Gly (390.6 Mpc)
- Apparent magnitude (V): 16.1
- Apparent magnitude (B): 16.9
- Surface brightness: 13.3

Characteristics
- Type: S, Sc
- Apparent size (V): 0.30' x 0.3'

Other designations
- VPC 805, PGC 165209, SSTSL2 J123117.83+104048.3, [DCY96] 247

IC 3447 (or PGC 165209) is a type Sc barred spiral galaxy located in the constellation Virgo. It has a redshift of 0.092479, which means IC 3447 is 1.27 billion light-years from Earth, making it one of the furthest objects in the Index Catalogue. The galaxy has apparent dimensions of 0.30 x 0.3 arcmin, which means IC 3447 is 111,000 light-years across. It was discovered by Royal Harwood Frost on May 10, 1904.
