= NGC 2223 =

Galaxy that hosted a supernova

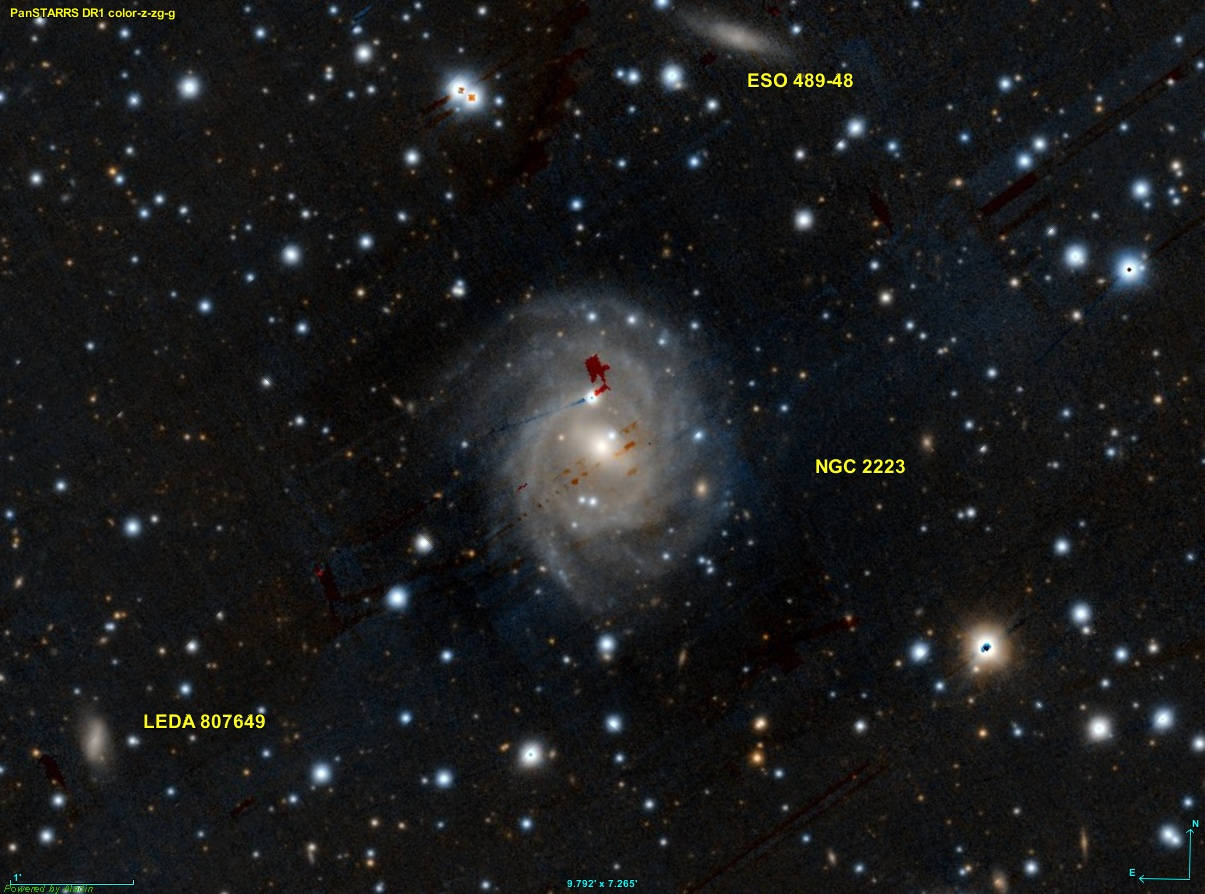
- The NGC 2223 galaxy is shown and labeled. On the lower left corner is LEDA 807649 and the upper right corner is ESO 489-48

Observation data
- Right ascension: 06h 25m 39s
- Declination: -22° 51’ 13”
- Absolute magnitude (B): 12.46
- Surface brightness: 23.36
- magnitude (J): 9.81
- magnitude (H): 9.14
- magnitude (K): 8.85

Characteristics
- Type: Spiral (SAbc)

Other designations
- UGCA 129, PGC 18978

NGC 2223 is a spiral galaxy located 105.9 million light years from Earth in the constellation of Canis Major.

The galaxy was host to a supernova that was named SN 1993K.
