= NGC 2217 =

Galaxy in the constellation Canis Major

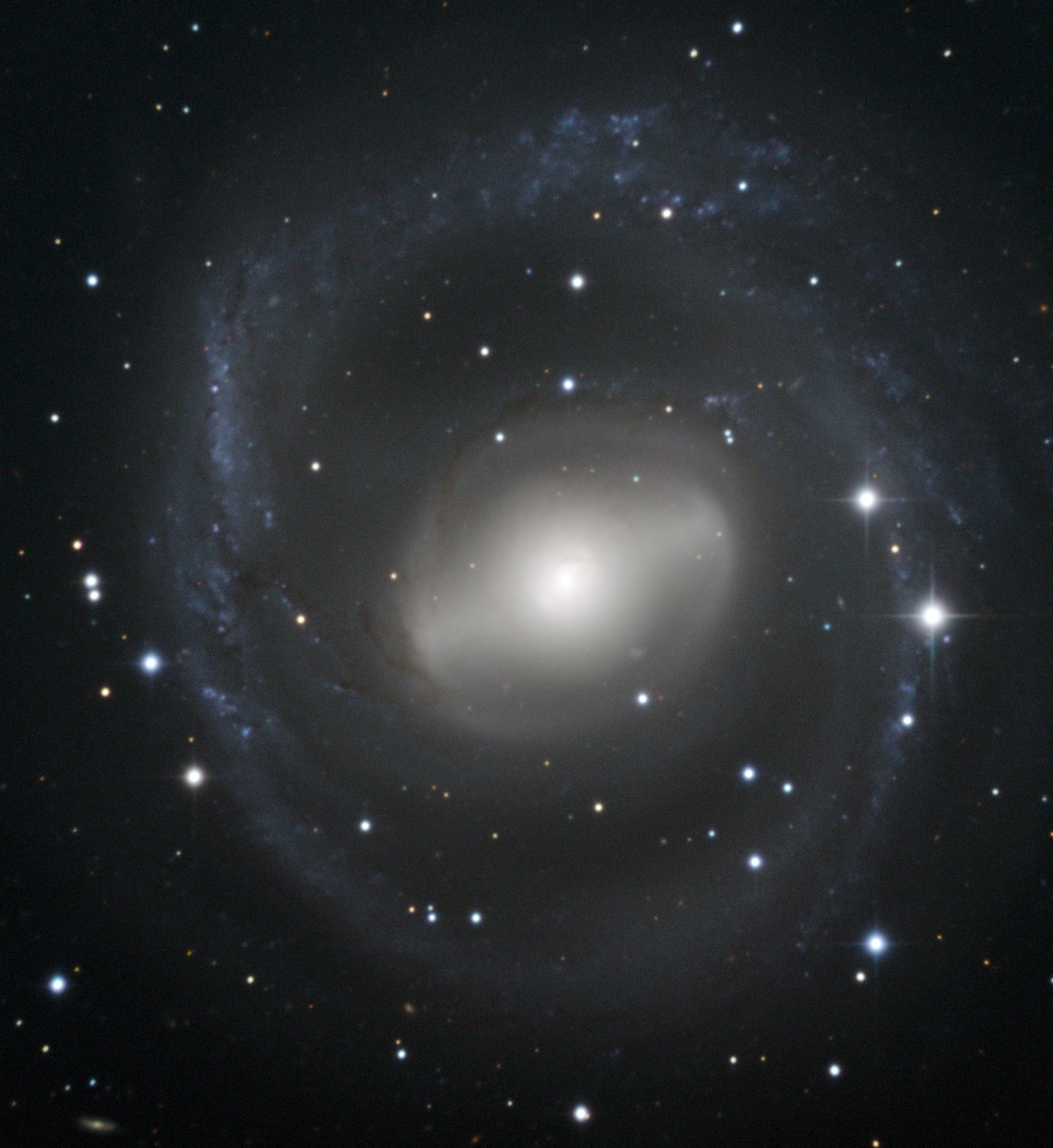
- Credit:ESO

Observation data (J2000 epoch)
- Constellation: Canis Major
- Right ascension: 06^{h} 21^{m} 40.35^{s}
- Declination: −27° 13′ 56.90″
- Redshift: 0.005400
- Heliocentric radial velocity: 1619 km/s
- Distance: 73 Mly 22.4 Mpc
- Apparent magnitude (V): 11.71

Characteristics
- Type: (R)SB0^{+}(rs)
- Apparent size (V): 4.44 ′ × 4.84 ′

Other designations
- MCG -05-15-010, PGC 18883

NGC 2217 is a barred spiral galaxy of about 100 thousand light-years across that lies roughly 65 million light years from Earth in the constellation of Canis Major. It was discovered by British astronomer John Herschel on 20 January 1835.

It is part of the NGC 2217 Group or LGG 136. It has at least 3 members, NGC 2217, ESO 489-29 and ESO 426-1.

A notable feature is the swirling shape of this galaxy. In its very concentrated central region we can see a distinctive, very luminous bar of stars within an oval ring. Further out, a set of tightly wound spiral arms almost form a circular ring around the galaxy. The galaxy is not very known as of now.

Central bars play an important role in the development of a galaxy. They can, for example, funnel gas towards the center of the galaxy, helping to feed a central black hole, or to form new stars.

== Supernova ==
One supernova has been observed in NGC 2217:

- SN 2017fzw (Type Ia, mag. 17.1687), was discovered by the Distance Less Than 40 Mpc Survey (DLT40) on 9 August, 2017.
