= NGC 1073 =

Barred spiral galaxy in the constellation Cetus

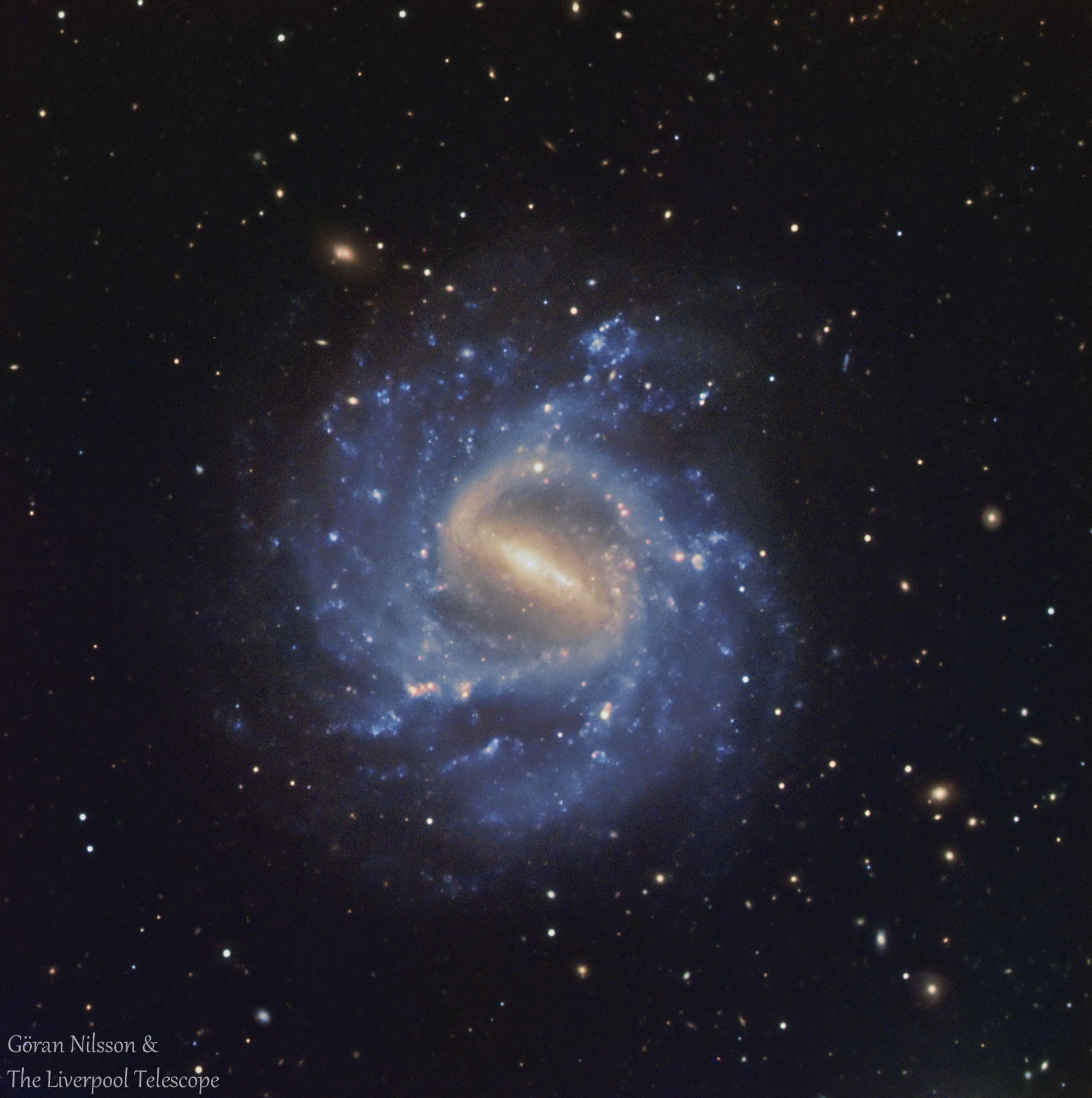
- NGC 1073 imaged by the Liverpool Telescope

Observation data (J2000 epoch)
- Constellation: Cetus
- Right ascension: 02^{h} 43^{m} 40.5199^{s}
- Declination: +01° 22′ 34.104″
- Redshift: 0.004013±0.00000667
- Heliocentric radial velocity: 1203 ± 2 km/s
- Distance: 47.1 ± 3.4 Mly (14.45 ± 1.04 Mpc)
- Apparent magnitude (V): 11.5

Characteristics
- Type: SB(rs)c
- Apparent size (V): 4.9′ × 4.5′

Other designations
- IRAS 02411+0109, 2MASX J02434059+0122331, UGC 2210, MCG +00-08-001, PGC 10329, CGCG 389-002

NGC 1073 is a barred spiral galaxy in the constellation Cetus. The galaxy is estimated to be about 55 million light years from Earth, possess a disk spanning an estimated 80,000 light years in diameter, and likely contains a type of active core, called an HII nucleus. It was discovered by German-British astronomer William Herschel on 9 October 1785.

NGC 1073 is similar to the Milky Way only in their shared possession of a galactic bar. NGC 1073, however, does not possess the well-defined symmetrical arm structure the Milky Way exhibits, and retains a central bar larger than our home galaxy's. NGC 1073 can be viewed with a mid-sized telescope in rural, dark skies.

NGC 1073 is a member of a galaxy group known as LGG 73, which contains 7 galaxies, NGC 1068, NGC 1055, UGCA 44, UGC 2302, UGC 2275 and UGC 2162.

== Supernova ==
One supernova has been observed in NGC 1073: SN 1962L (Type Ic, mag. 13.9) was discovered by Leonida Rosino on 23 November 1962, and independently by Enrique Chavira and Guillermo Haro.
