= Barred spiral galaxy =

Spiral galaxy with a central bar-shaped structure composed of stars

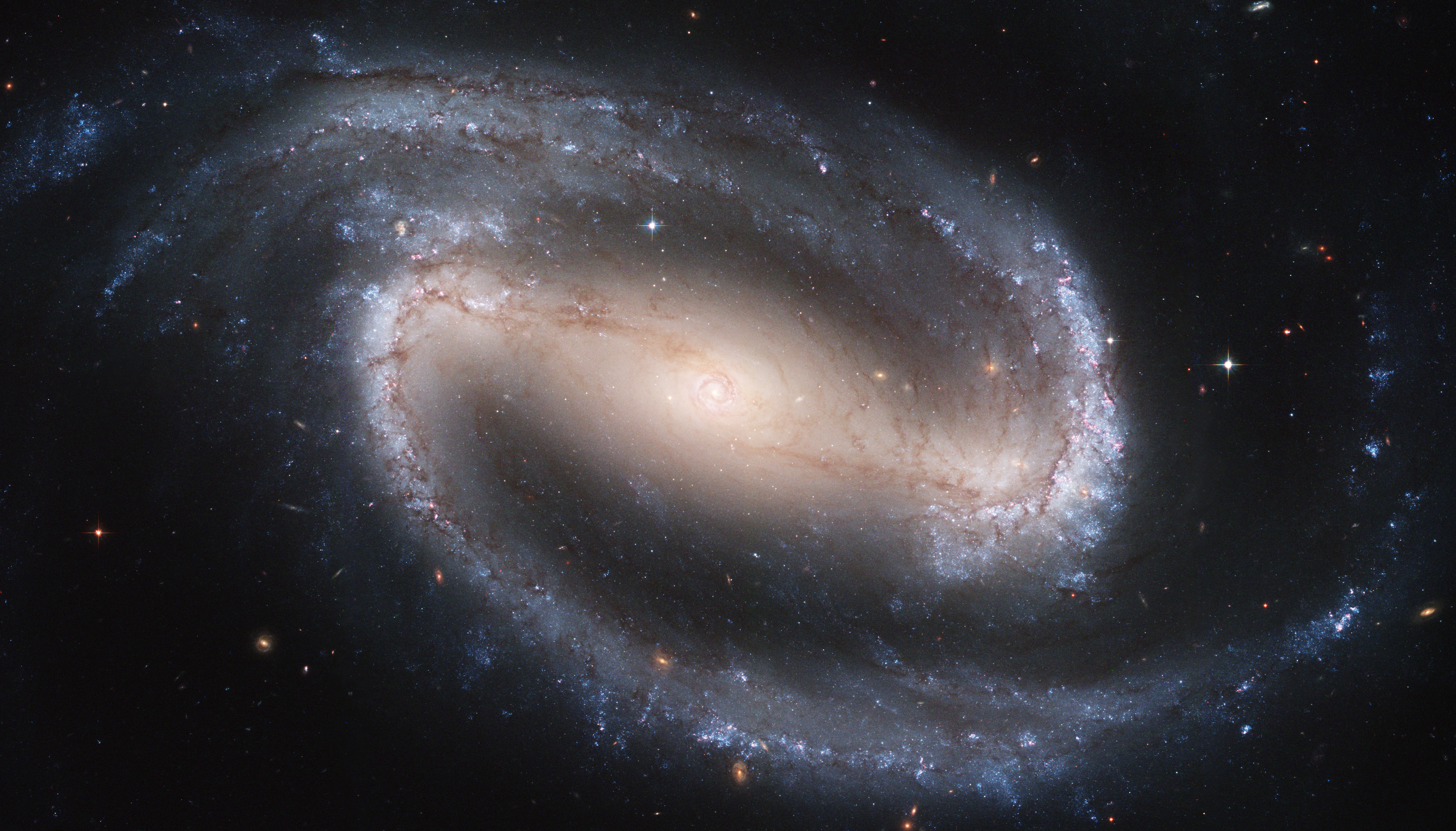
NGC 1300, viewed nearly face-on; Hubble Space Telescope image

A barred spiral galaxy is a spiral galaxy with a central bar-shaped structure composed of stars. Bars are found in about two thirds of all spiral galaxies in the local universe, and generally affect both the motions of stars and interstellar gas within spiral galaxies and can affect spiral arms as well. The Milky Way Galaxy, where the Solar System is located, is classified as a barred spiral galaxy.

Edwin Hubble classified spiral galaxies of this type as "SB" (spiral, barred) in his Hubble sequence and arranged them into sub-categories based on how open the arms of the spiral are. SBa types feature tightly bound arms, while SBc types are at the other extreme and have loosely bound arms. SBb-type galaxies lie in between the two. SB0 is a barred lenticular galaxy. A new type, SBm, was subsequently created to describe somewhat irregular barred spirals, such as the Magellanic Clouds, which were once classified as irregular galaxies, but have since been found to contain barred spiral structures. Among other types in Hubble's classifications for the galaxies are the spiral galaxy, elliptical galaxy and irregular galaxy.

Although theoretical models of galaxy formation and evolution had not previously expected galaxies becoming stable enough to host bars very early in the universe's history, evidence has recently emerged of the existence of numerous spiral galaxies in the early universe.

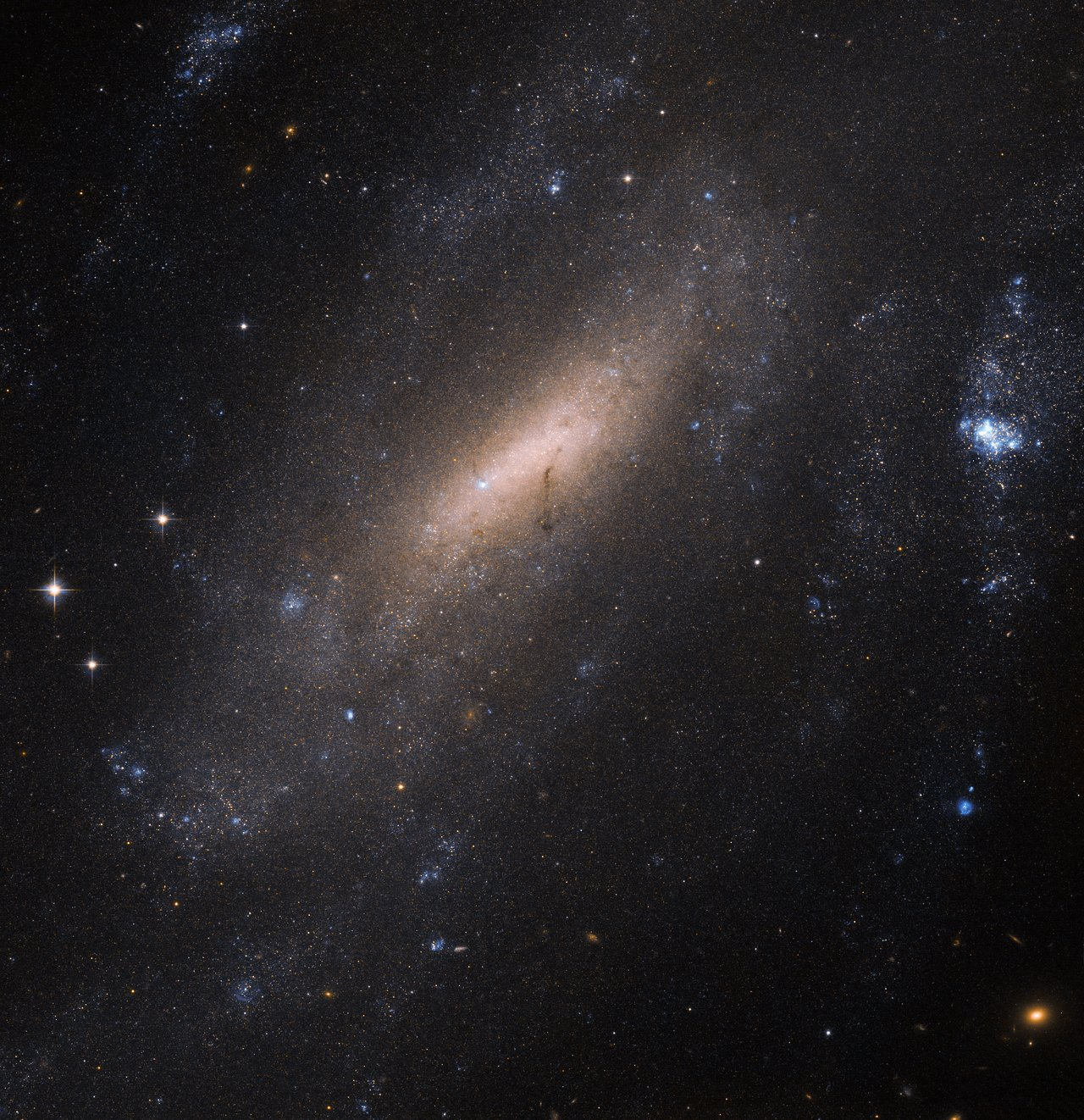
Barred spiral galaxy IC 5201, located more than 40 million light-years from Earth. It was discovered by Joseph Lunt.

== Bars ==
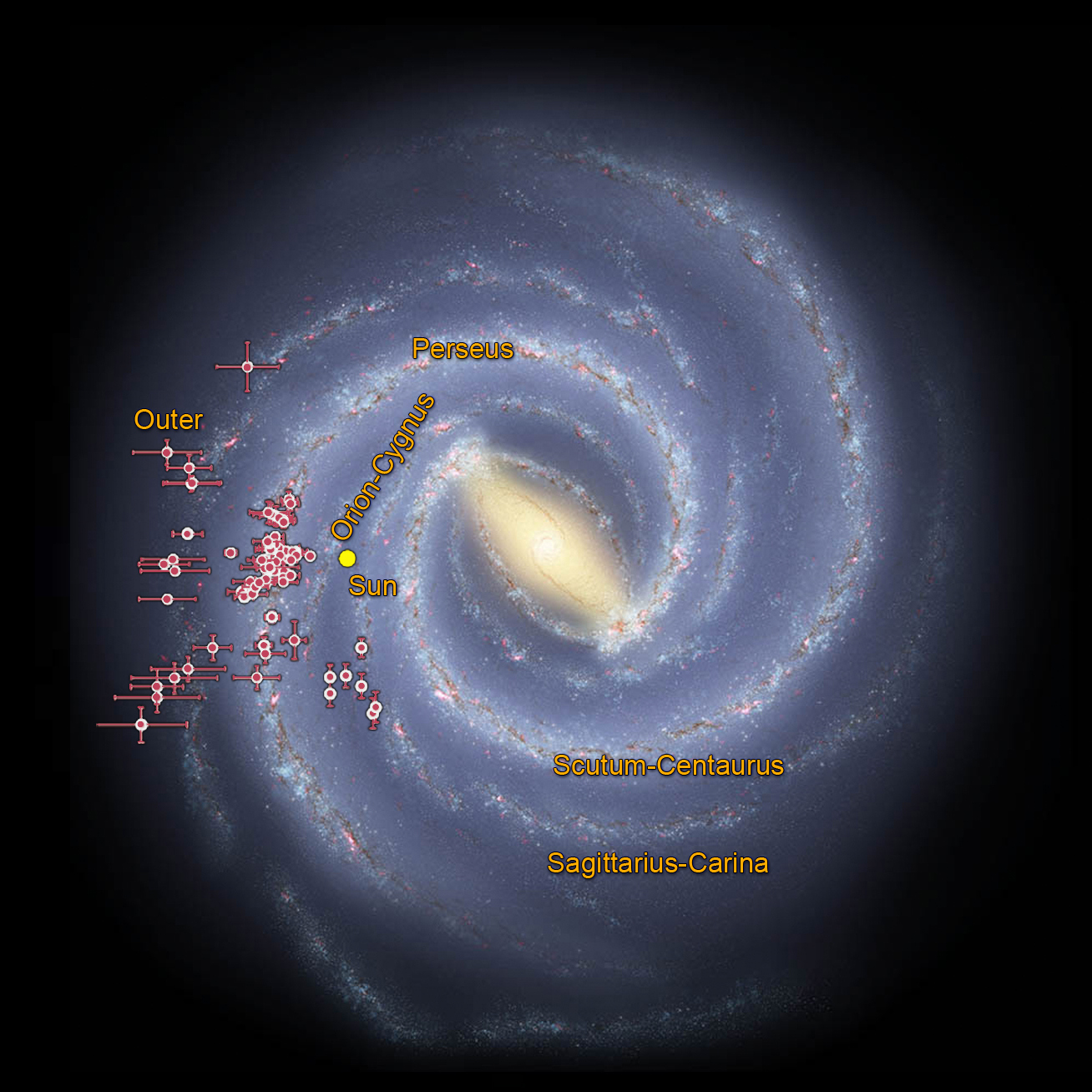
Milky Way Galaxy spiral arms – based on WISE data.

Barred galaxies are apparently predominant, with surveys showing that up to two-thirds of all spiral galaxies develop a bar. The creation of the bar is generally thought to be the result of a density wave radiating from the center of the galaxy whose effects reshape the orbits of the inner stars. This effect builds over time to stars orbiting farther out, which creates a self-perpetuating bar structure.

The bar structure is believed to act as a type of stellar nursery, channeling gas inwards from the spiral arms through orbital resonance, fueling star birth in the vicinity of its center. This process is also thought to explain why many barred spiral galaxies have active galactic nuclei, such as that seen in the Southern Pinwheel Galaxy. Early-type barred galaxies can show an enhancement at their ends of their bars known as ansae.

Bars are thought to be temporary phenomena in the lives of spiral galaxies; the bar structures decay over time, transforming galaxies from barred spirals to more "regular" spiral patterns. Past a certain size the accumulated mass of the bar compromises the stability of the overall bar structure. Simulations show that many bars likely experience a "buckling" event in which a disturbance in the orbital resonances of stars in the bar structure leads to an inward collapse in which the bar becomes thicker and shorter, though the exact mechanism behind this buckling instability remains hotly debated. Barred spiral galaxies with high mass accumulated in their center thus tend to have short, stubby bars. Such buckling phenomena are significantly suppressed and delayed by the presence of a supermassive black hole in the galactic center but occur nonetheless.

Since so many spiral galaxies have bar structures, it is likely that they are recurring phenomena in spiral galaxy development. The oscillating evolutionary cycle from spiral galaxy to barred spiral galaxy is thought to take on average about two billion years.

Recent studies have confirmed the idea that bars are a sign of galaxies reaching full maturity as the "formative years" end. A 2008 investigation found that only 20 percent of the spiral galaxies in the distant past possessed bars, compared with about 65 percent of their local counterparts.

== Grades ==
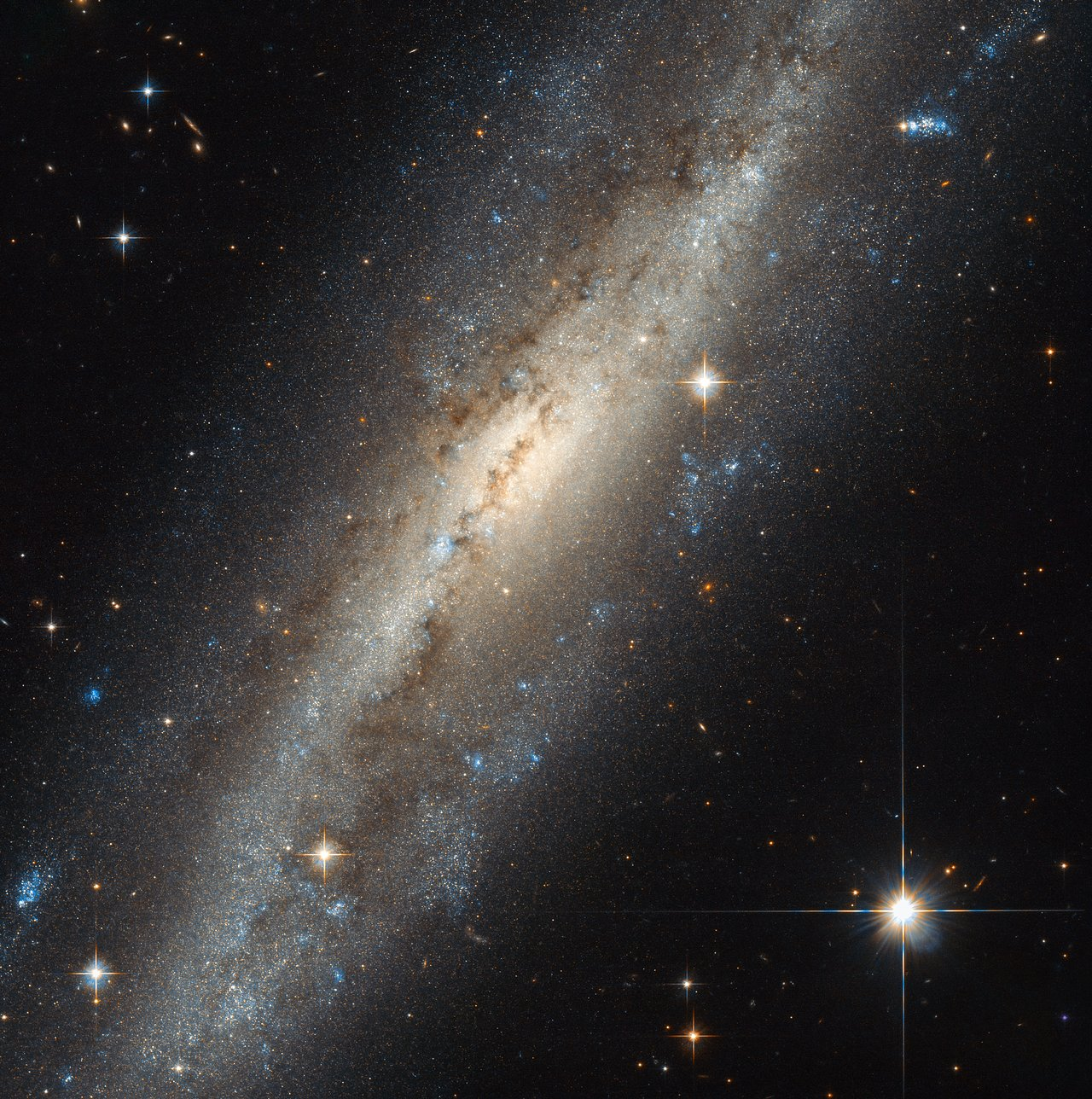
NGC 7640 is a barred spiral galaxy in the Andromeda constellation.

The general classification is "SB" (spiral barred). The sub-categories are based on how open or tight the arms of the spiral are. SBa types feature tightly bound arms. SBc types are at the other extreme and have loosely bound arms. SBb galaxies lie in between. SBm describes somewhat irregular barred spirals. SB0 is a barred lenticular galaxy.

=== Examples ===
| Example | Type | Image | Information |
|---|---|---|---|
| NGC 2787 | SB0 | | SB0 is a type of lenticular galaxy |
| NGC 4314 | SBa | | |
| NGC 4921 | SBab | | |
| Messier 95 | SBb | | |
| NGC 3953 | SBbc | | |
| NGC 1073 | SBc | | |
| Messier 108 | SBcd | | |
| NGC 2903 | SBbc | | |
| NGC 5398 | SBdm | | SBdm can also be considered a type of barred Magellanic spiral |
| NGC 55 | SBm | | SBm is a type of Magellanic spiral (Sm) |

=== Other examples ===
| Name | Image | Type | Constellation |
|---|---|---|---|
| M58 | | SBc | Virgo |
| M91 | | SBb | Coma Berenices |
| M95 | | SBb | Leo |
| M109 | | SBb | Ursa Major |
| NGC 1300 | | SBbc | Eridanus |
| NGC 7541 | | SB(rs)bcpec | Pisces |
| NGC 1365 | | SBc | Fornax |
| NGC 2217 | | SBa | Canis Major |
| Magellanic Clouds | | SBm | Dorado, Tucana |
| UGC 12158 | | SB | Pegasus |
| NGC 1512 | | SB(r)ab | Horologium |

== See also ==
- Galaxy morphological classification
- Galaxy formation and evolution
- IC 1011
- IC 3447
- Ceers-2112 galaxy
- Lenticular galaxy
- Firehose instability
