= Messier 77 =

Galaxy in the constellation Cetus

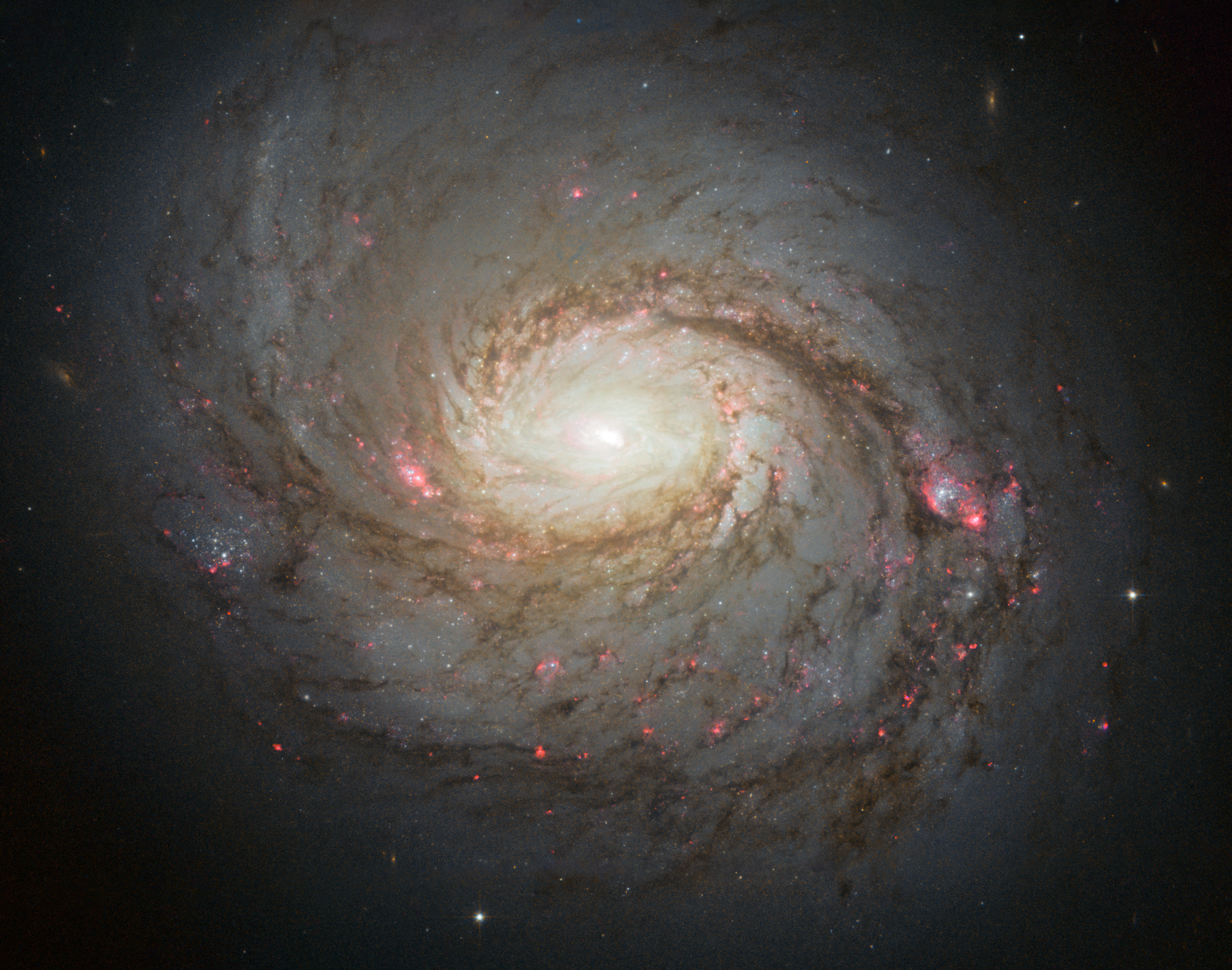
- M77 imaged by the Hubble Space Telescope

Observation data (J2000 epoch)
- Constellation: Cetus
- Right ascension: 02^{h} 42^{m} 40.771^{s}
- Declination: −00° 00′ 47.84″
- Redshift: 0.003793
- Heliocentric radial velocity: 1,137±3 km/s
- Distance: 35.0 ± 1.7 Mly (10.72 ± 0.52 Mpc)
- Apparent magnitude (V): 8.9

Characteristics
- Type: (R)SA(rs)b
- Mass: ~1×10^{12} M_{☉}
- Size: 27.70 kiloparsecs (90,000 light-years) (diameter; D_{25} isophote)
- Apparent size (V): 7.1′ × 6.0′
- Notable features: One of the biggest galaxies of Messier's catalog. Inclination estimated to be 40°.

Other designations
- Cetus A,, 3C 71, 4C -00.13, IRAS 02401-0013, NGC 1068, Arp 37, UGC 2188, MCG +00-07-083, PGC 10266, CGCG 388-098

Messier 77 (M77), also known as NGC 1068 or the Squid Galaxy, is a barred spiral galaxy in the constellation Cetus. It is 35 million light-years (11 Mpc) away from Earth, and was discovered by Pierre Méchain in 1780, who originally described it as a nebula. Méchain then communicated his discovery to Charles Messier, who subsequently listed the object in his catalog. Both Messier and William Herschel described this galaxy as a star cluster. Today, however, the object is known to be a galaxy. It is one of the brightest Seyfert galaxies visible from Earth and has a D_{25} isophotal diameter of about 27.70 kiloparsecs (90,000 light-years).

Messier 77 is considered to part of a galaxy group known as LGG 73. It consists of at least 7 galaxies, which are NGC 1055, NGC 1073, UGCA 44, UGC 2302, UGC 2275 and UGC 2162.

== Morphology ==
The morphological classification of Messier 77 in the De Vaucouleurs system is (R)SA(rs)b, where the '(R)' denotes an outer ring-like structure, 'SA' denotes a non-barred spiral, '(rs)' denotes a transitional inner ring/spiral structure, and 'b' denotes the spiral arms are moderately wound. Ann et al. (2015) gave it a class of SAa, suggesting tightly wound arms. However, infrared images of the inner part of the galaxy reveal a prominent bar not seen in visual light, and for this reason it is now considered a barred spiral. Messier 77 is the largest member of a small group of galaxies, which includes NGC 1055, an edge-on spiral galaxy likely twisted by gravitational interactions with Messier 77, and five small irregular galaxies.

Messier 77 is an active galaxy with an active galactic nucleus (AGN), which is obscured from view by astronomical dust at visible wavelengths. The diameter of the molecular disk and hot plasma associated with the obscuring material was first measured at radio wavelengths by the Very Long Baseline Array (VLBA) and the Very Large Array (VLA). The hot dust around the nucleus was subsequently measured in the mid-infrared by the MIDI instrument at the Very Large Telescope (VLT) observatory. It is one of the brightest, closest, and best-studied type 2 Seyfert galaxies, forming a prototype of this class.

== Research ==
Messier 77 is of key interest to scientists due to its relative proximity and luminosity, allowing for study of its active galactic nucleus. This section contains relevant scientific discoveries that have been made as a result of studying Messier 77.

It has been proposed that type 2 Seyfert galaxies are the same class of object as type 1 Seyfert galaxies, viewed from such an angle that the type 1 core is hidden from view. An analysis of Messier 77's spectra using interferometry by Tacconi et al. (1994) suggested that the galaxy's Seyfert 1 core was obstructed by a thick molecular cloud region.

It has a radio jet consisting of a northeast and a southwest region, caused by interactions with the interstellar medium. The presence of bow shocks in the northeast region due to these interactions overlap with the edges of molecular outflow, suggesting that the jet is responsible for the outflow.

X-ray source 1H 0244+001 in the Cetus constellation was identified as Messier 77 in 1984.

In February 2022 astronomers reported a cloud of cosmic dust, detected through infrared interferometry observations, located at the centre of Messier 77 that is hiding a supermassive black hole.

In November 2022, the IceCube Neutrino Observatory collaboration, or IceCube, announced the detection of a neutrino source emitted by the active galactic nucleus of Messier 77. It is the second detection by IceCube after TXS 0506+056, and only the fourth known source including SN1987A and solar neutrinos. A potential candidate for the source of these neutrinos is the magnetic corona surrounding the active galactic nucleus, providing powerful enough particle acceleration to cause neutron radiation phenomena. To explain the combination of Messier 77 being an energetic neutrinos source and a weak gamma rays source, a mechanism was suggested whereby helium nuclei collide with ultraviolet photons emitted by the galaxy's central region and break up, releasing neutrons that eventually decay into neutrinos without producing gamma rays.

== Supernova ==
SN 2018ivc (Type II, mag. 14.6523) was the only supernova so far observed in Messier 77, discovered by the DLT40 Survey on 24 November 2018.

== Gallery ==
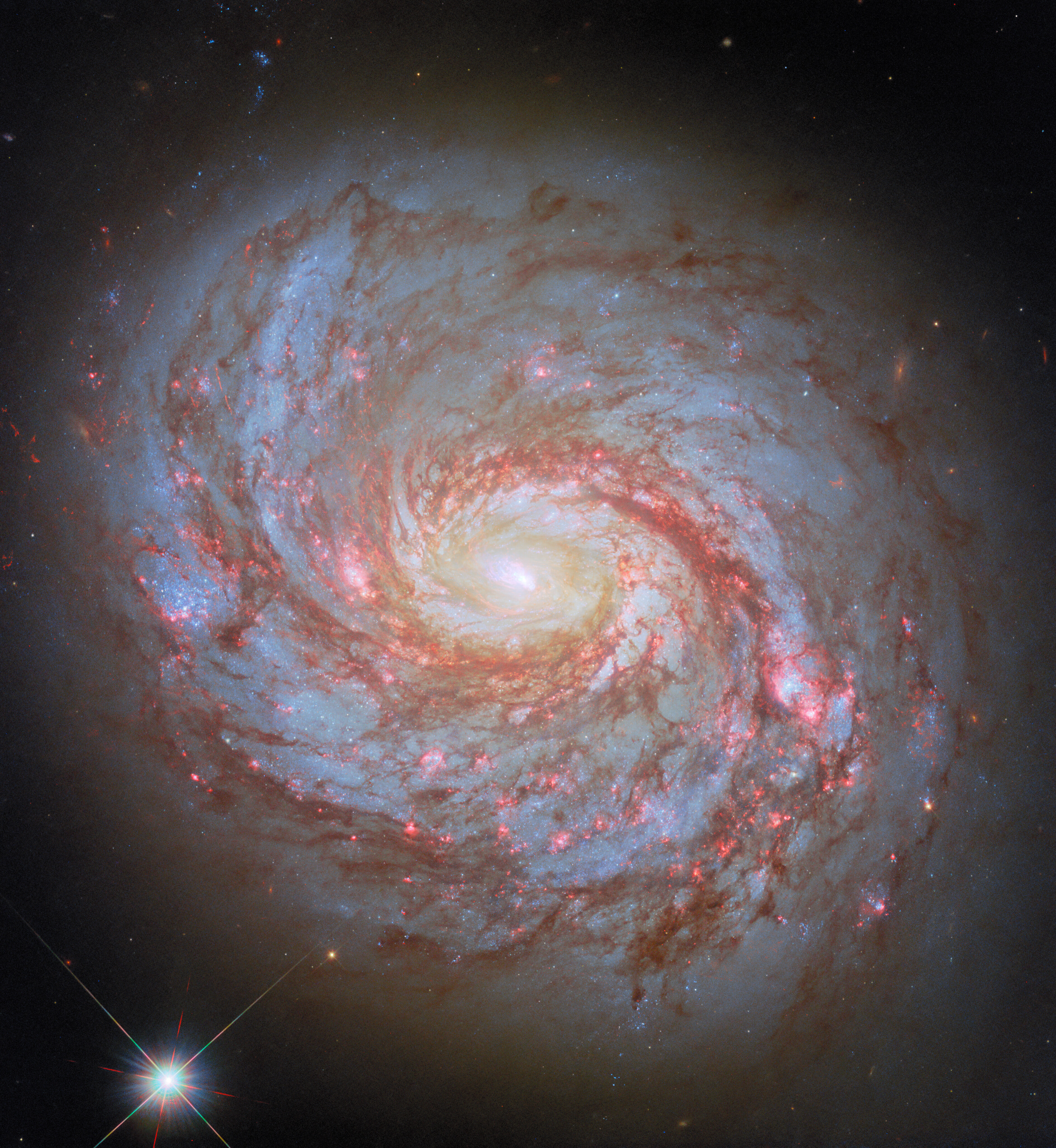
M77 imaged by the Hubble Space Telescope.

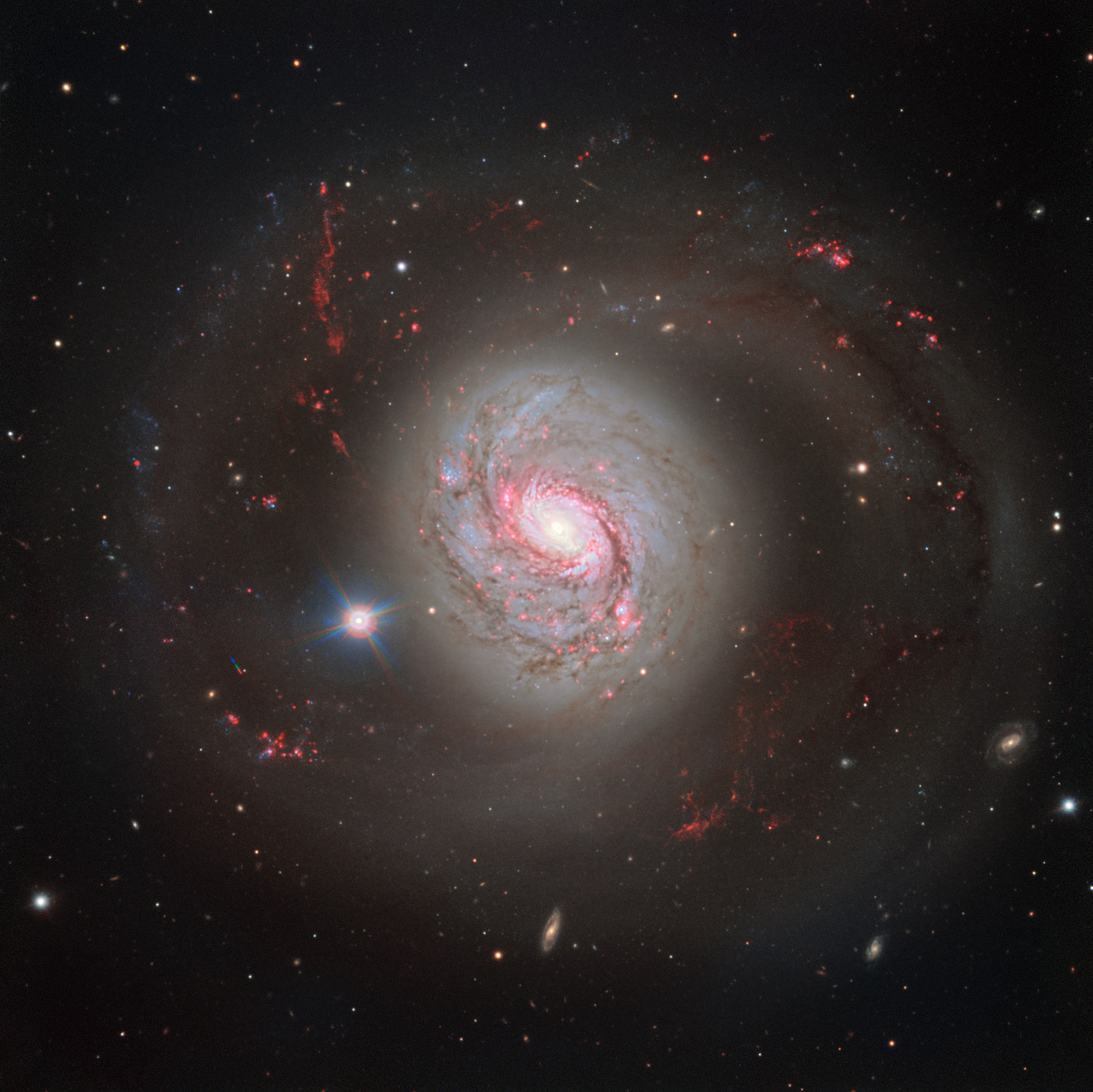
M77 imaged by ESO's VLT.

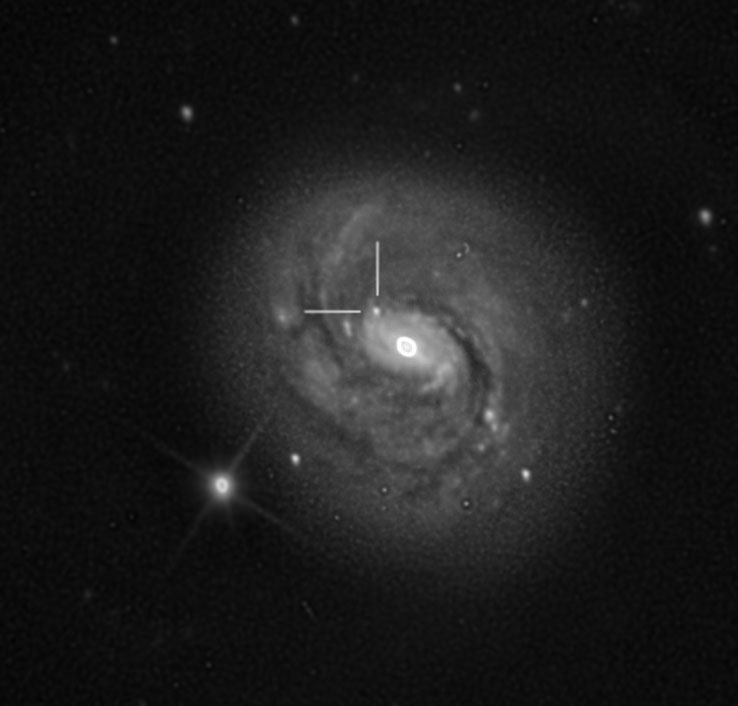
M77 with supernova SN 2018ivc in November, 2018.

M77 imaged by the James Webb Space Telescope.

== See also ==
- List of Messier objects
- NGC 1106, an active-nucleus galaxy
