= NGC 1340 =

Elliptical galaxy in the constellation Fornax

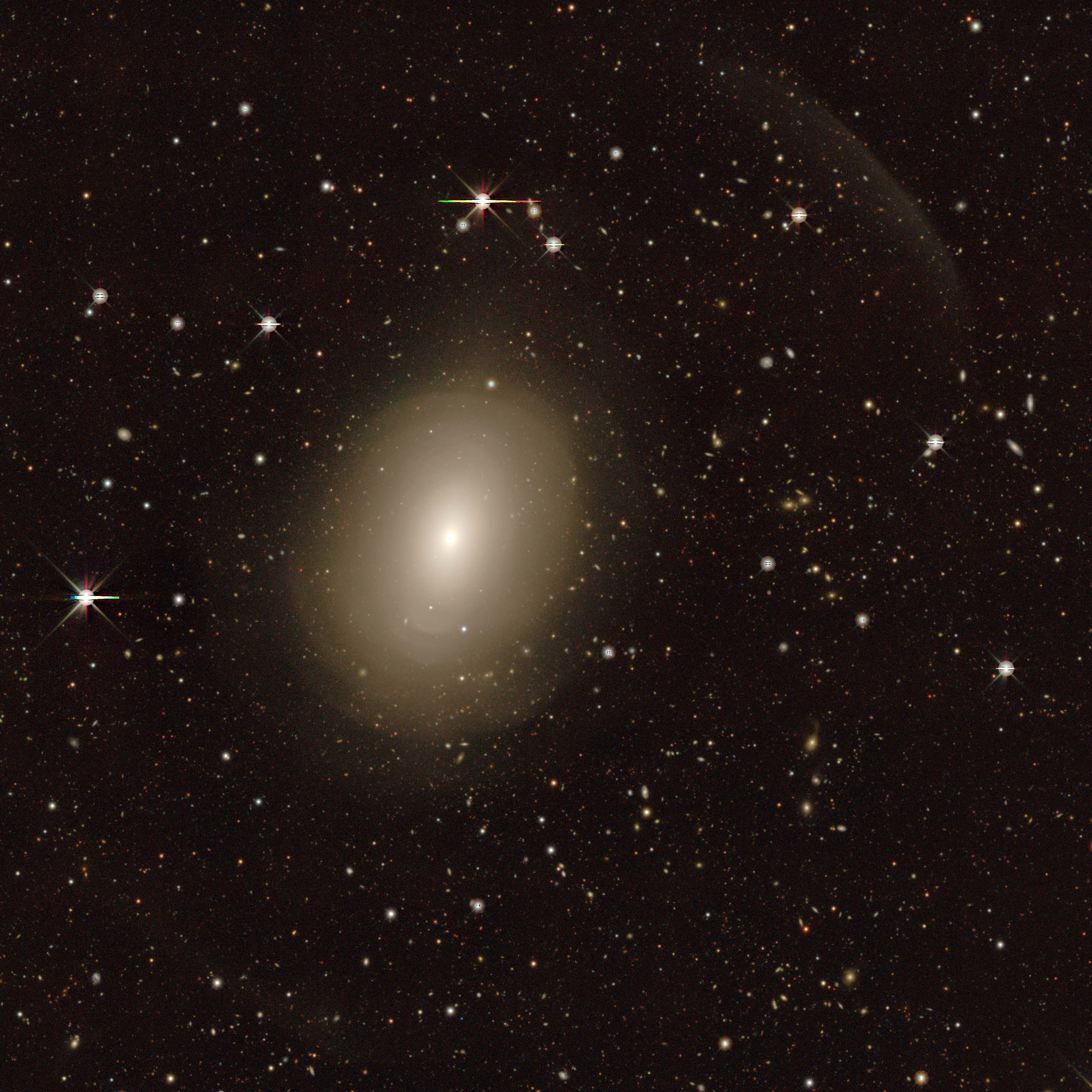

Observation data (J2000 epoch)
- Constellation: Fornax
- Right ascension: 03h 28m 20s
- Declination: -31° 04′ 05″
- Redshift: 0.004140
- Heliocentric radial velocity: (+1169 ± 15) km/s
- Distance: 54.2 Mly (16.61 Mpc)
- Apparent magnitude (V): 10.4
- Apparent magnitude (B): 11.3

Characteristics
- Type: E5
- Size: 145,000 ly (estimated)

Other designations
- NGC 1344, ESO 418-G005, PGC 12923, AM 0326-311, MCG -05-09-005

NGC 1340 is an elliptical galaxy located in the constellation Fornax. Its speed relative to the cosmic microwave background is 1,126 ± 17 km/s, which corresponds to a Hubble Distance of 16.6 ± 1.2 Mpc (~54.1 million ly). It was discovered by the German-British astronomer William Herschel in 1790, but it was added to the New General Catalog under the designation NGC 1344 later.

This galaxy was later observed by the British astronomer John Herschel on November 19, 1835, and it is this observation that was added to the New General Catalog under the designation NGC 1340.

To date, 34 non-redshift measurements yield a distance of 18.688 ± 3.160 Mpc (~61 million ly), which is within the Hubble distance range.

== NGC 1399 group ==
NGC 1340 (NGC 1344 in Garcia's article) is part of the NGC 1399 group. This group is part of the Fornax cluster and it includes at least 42 galaxies, including NGC 1326, NGC 1336, NGC 1339, NGC 1351, NGC 1366, NGC 1369, NGC 1373, NGC 1374, NGC 1379, NGC 1387, NGC 1399, NGC 1406, NGC 1419, NGC 1425, NGC 1427, NGC 1428, NGC 1436 (NGC 1437), NGC 1460, IC 1913 and IC 1919.

== See also ==
- List of NGC objects (1001–2000)
