= NGC 1350 =

Spiral galaxy in the constellation Fornax

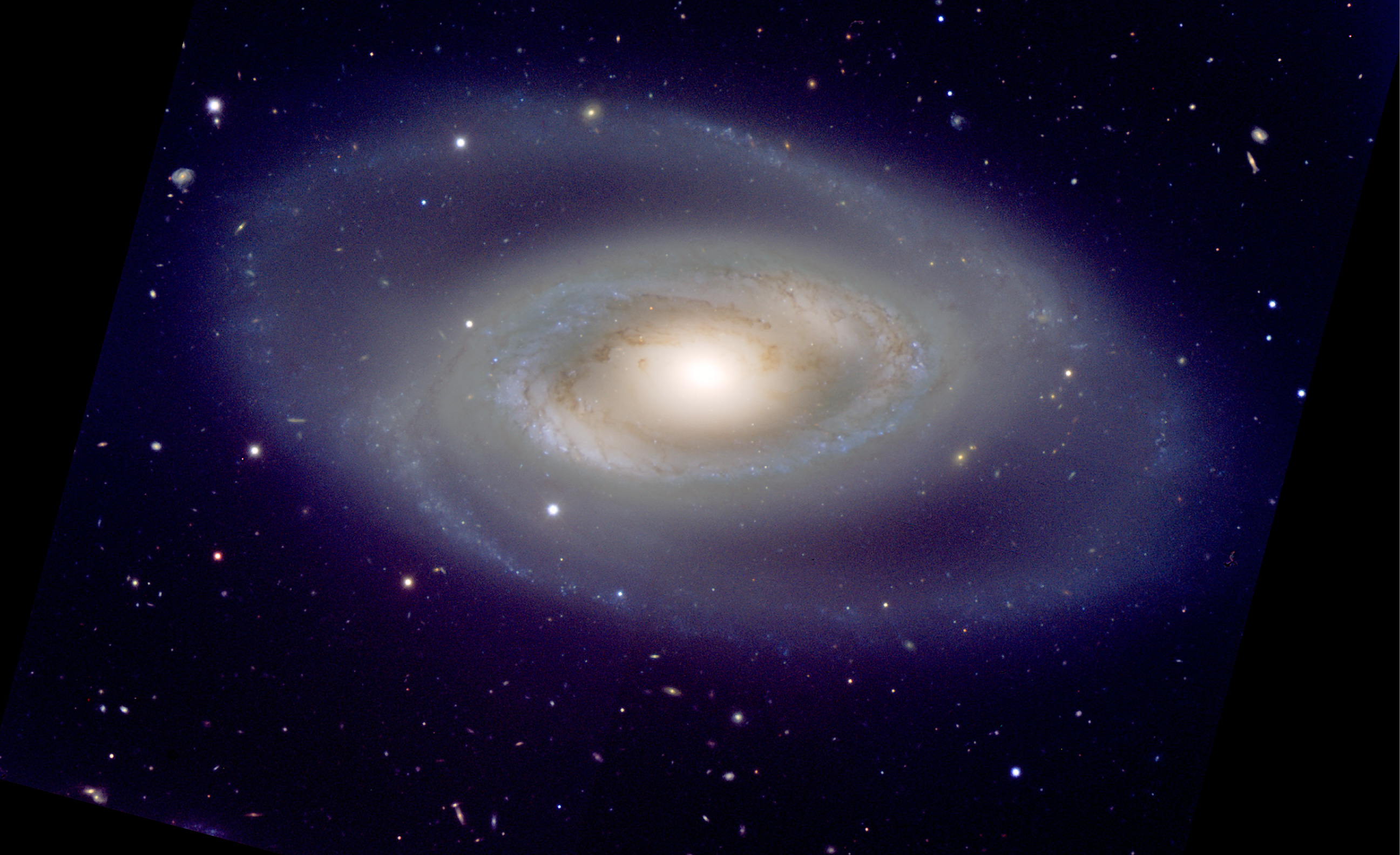
- NGC 1350 imaged by the European Southern Observatory in 2005

Observation data (J2000 epoch)
- Constellation: Fornax
- Right ascension: 03^{h} 31^{m} 08.074^{s}
- Declination: −33° 37′ 41.959″
- Redshift: 0.006354
- Distance: 87.4 Mly (26.8 Mpc)
- Group or cluster: NGC 1316 group (LGG 94)
- Apparent magnitude (V): 11.46

Characteristics
- Type: Sa(r)
- Size: ~144,200 ly (44.20 kpc) (estimated)
- Apparent size (V): 5.2 x 2.8 arcmin
- Notable features: pronounced ring structure

Other designations
- ESO 358- G 013, IRAS 03291-3347, MCG -06-08-023, PGC 13059

NGC 1350 is a spiral galaxy located 87 million light years away in the southern constellation Fornax (the Furnace). It was discovered by Scottish astronomer James Dunlop on 24 November 1826.

== Characteristics ==
NGC 1350 measures roughly 130,000 light years across: slightly larger than Earth's own galaxy, the Milky Way. It is classified as an Sa(r) galaxy, meaning that it is a spiral with arms wound tightly enough to form a prominent central ring. The faint outer ring (called a "pseudo-ring") is sometimes added to the beginning of the classification with the designation "R^{'}_{1}." NGC 1350 is seen on the outskirts of the Fornax Cluster of galaxies, but its membership is uncertain due to distance.

== Supernova ==
One supernova has been observed in NGC 1350: SN 1959A (type unknown, mag. 16) was discovered by Howard S. Gates on 6 January 1959.

== Image ==
The image on the right is an almost-true color composite image made with the VLT's 8.2 meter Kueyen telescope on 26 Jan 2000, at the European Southern Observatory site at Cerro Paranal, Chile. Observations were done at the following wavelengths (and assigned the following colors): B (blue) for 6 minutes, V (green) for 4 minutes, R (orange) for 3 minutes, and I (red) for 3 minutes. The image covers a region of 8.0 x 5.0 arcminutes of sky. North is to the left and East is down.

The viewing angle and the two rings make NGC 1350 look somewhat like a cosmic "eye." Another feature is the tenuous nature of the outer arms, through which a number of background galaxies can be seen. The outer region's blue tint indicates the presence of star formation.

== NGC 1316 group ==
NGC 1350 is a member of the NGC 1316 group (also known as LGG 94), which includes at least 20 galaxies, including IC 335, NGC 1310, NGC 1316, NGC 1317, NGC 1326A, NGC 1341, NGC 1365, NGC 1380, NGC 1381, NGC 1382, NGC 1404, and NGC 1427A.
