= NGC 1341 =

Spiral galaxy in the Fornax Cluster

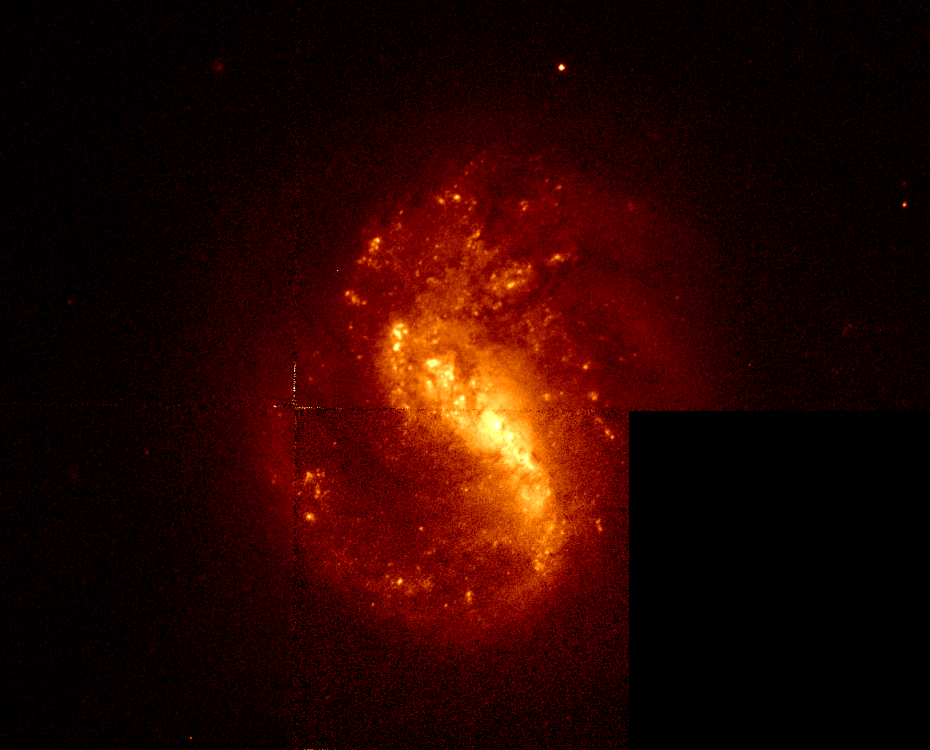
- Hubble Space Telescope image of NGC 1341

Observation data (J2000 epoch)
- Constellation: Fornax
- Right ascension: 03^{h} 27.6^{m}
- Declination: −37° 8′
- Redshift: 1854 km/s
- Distance: 26.4 Mpc (86.1 Mly)
- Apparent magnitude (V): 11.8

Characteristics
- Type: SBab
- Apparent size (V): 1.2′ × 1.1′

Other designations
- ESO 358-8, IRAS 03260-3719, MCG -6-8-20, PGC 12911

NGC 1341 is a barred spiral galaxy in the constellation Fornax, 86 million light years away. It is one of the most distant members of the Fornax Cluster. Discovered by John Herschel on November 29, 1837, it is 30,000 light years in diameter and has a redshift of 1854 km/s.

== See also ==
- NGC 1399
- NGC 1365
- NGC 1350
- NGC 1427A
