= PGC 13809 =

Galaxy in the constellation Fornax

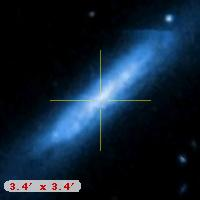
- Optical image of PGC 13809

Observation data (J2000 epoch)
- Constellation: Fornax
- Right ascension: 03^{h} 46^{m} 3^{s}
- Declination: −34° 57′
- Redshift: 1838 km/s
- Group or cluster: Fornax Cluster
- Apparent magnitude (B): 12,6

Characteristics
- Type: Sc
- Size: ≈ 90,000 light-years in diameter
- Apparent size (V): 4,8'

Other designations
- ESO 358-63, MCG-06-09-030

PGC 13809 is a spiral, almost edge-on galaxy in the constellation Fornax. It was discovered by the European Southern Observatory and it is a member of the Fornax Cluster.

PGC 13809 has a Hubble classification of Sc, indicating it is an unbarred spiral galaxy with loose spiral arms. It is also seen nearly edge-on, with an angle of about ≈80 degrees (≈80°). Its size on the night sky is 4.8' x 0.8', indicating a real size of about 90,000 light-years, so PGC 13809 is slightly smaller than the Milky Way. It is also one of the larger galaxies in the Fornax Cluster, a cluster of 200 galaxies. Its magnitude is 12.6.

With a redshift of 1838 km/s, it is one of the faster moving galaxies in the Fornax Cluster, but it is close to the central giant elliptical galaxy NGC 1399, so gravitational reaction is possible.
