= IC 1913 =

Barred spiral galaxy in the constellation of Fornax

- IC 1913 imaged by Legacy Surveys

Observation data (J2000 epoch)
- Constellation: Fornax
- Right ascension: 03^{h} 19.345^{m}
- Declination: −32° 28′
- Distance: 20.4 Mpc (66.5 Mly)
- Group or cluster: Fornax Cluster
- Apparent magnitude (V): 13.6

Characteristics
- Type: SBb
- Apparent size (V): 1.9′ × 0.3′

Other designations
- ESO 357-16, MCG -5-8-27, PGC 12404

IC 1913 is a barred spiral galaxy in the constellation Fornax. It belongs to the Fornax Cluster, which contains approximately 200 galaxies.

It is 66.5 million light years distant from Earth, and based on its size on the night sky and distance, it is 37,000 light years in diameter. It was discovered by DeLisle Stewart in 1899.

It is visible from the Southern Hemisphere using a telescope, but not with a naked eye.

== See also ==
- IC 1919
- NGC 1399
- NGC 1427A
