= IC 1993 =

Galaxy in the constellation Fornax

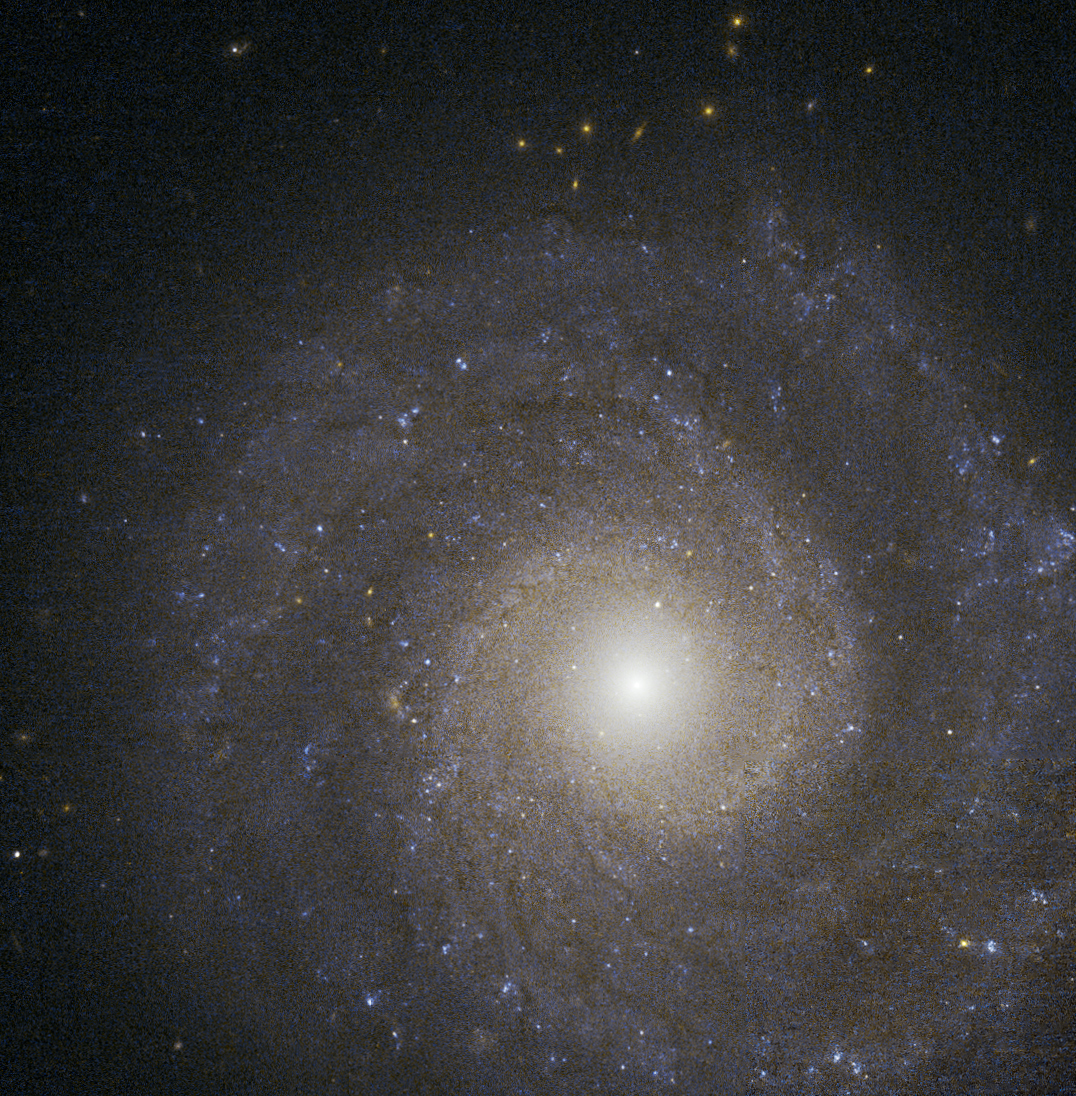
- IC 1993

Observation data (J2000 epoch)
- Constellation: Fornax
- Right ascension: 03^{h} 47^{m} 4.8^{s}
- Declination: −33° 42′ 38″
- Redshift: 1057 ± 21 km/s
- Distance: 50 Mly (15 Mpc)
- Apparent magnitude (V): 12.6

Characteristics
- Type: (R')SA(s)bc
- Size: 2.5′ × 2.2′ (45,000 light-years in diameter)

Other designations
- ESO 358-65, IRAS 03451-3351, MCG -6-9-32, PGC 13840

IC 1993 is an unbarred spiral galaxy in the constellation Fornax. It was discovered by Lewis Swift on November 19, 1897. At a distance of about 50 million light-years, and redshift of 1057 km/s, it is one of the closest to us of the 200 galaxies in the Fornax Cluster.

IC 1993 is a galaxy with several spiral arms in its disc, and it has a Hubble classification of (R')SA(s)bc, indicating it is an intermediate spiral galaxy with a ring on its outer edges. It is a remote galaxy, far from the center of the Fornax Cluster. It is at the edge of the Fornax Cluster. Near the galaxy is a bright foreground star that makes deep observations more difficult, so the galaxy's apparent magnitude is 12.6. Its size in the night sky is 2.5' x 2.2', and it has a diameter of 45000 light-years.

IC 1993 is one of the 25 galaxies known to have rings or partial rings. Most resemble local collisional ring galaxies in morphology, size, and clumpy star formation. Clump ages range from 10^{8} to 10^{9} yr, and clump masses go up to several × 10^{8} solar masses, based on color evolution models. The clump ages are consistent with the expected lifetimes of ring structures if they are formed by collisions.

There are 15 other galaxies that resemble the arcs in partial ring galaxies but haven't evident disk emission. Their clumps have bluer colors at all redshifts compared to the clumps in the ring and partial ring sample, and their clump ages are younger than in rings and partial rings by a factor of ~10. In most respects, they resemble chain galaxies except for their curvature.

Several rings are symmetric with centered nuclei and no obvious companions. They could be outer Lindblad resonance rings, although some have no obvious bars or spirals to drive them. If these symmetric cases are resonance rings, then they could be the precursors of modern resonance rings, which are only ~30% larger on average. This similarity in radius suggests that the driving pattern speed has not slowed by more by ~30% during the last ~7 Gyr. Those without bars could be examples of dissolved bars.

== See also ==
- NGC 1425, a similar spiral galaxy, also in the Fornax Cluster
- NGC 1532, another spiral galaxy in the Fornax Cluster
