= NGC 1381 =

Galaxy in the constellation Fornax

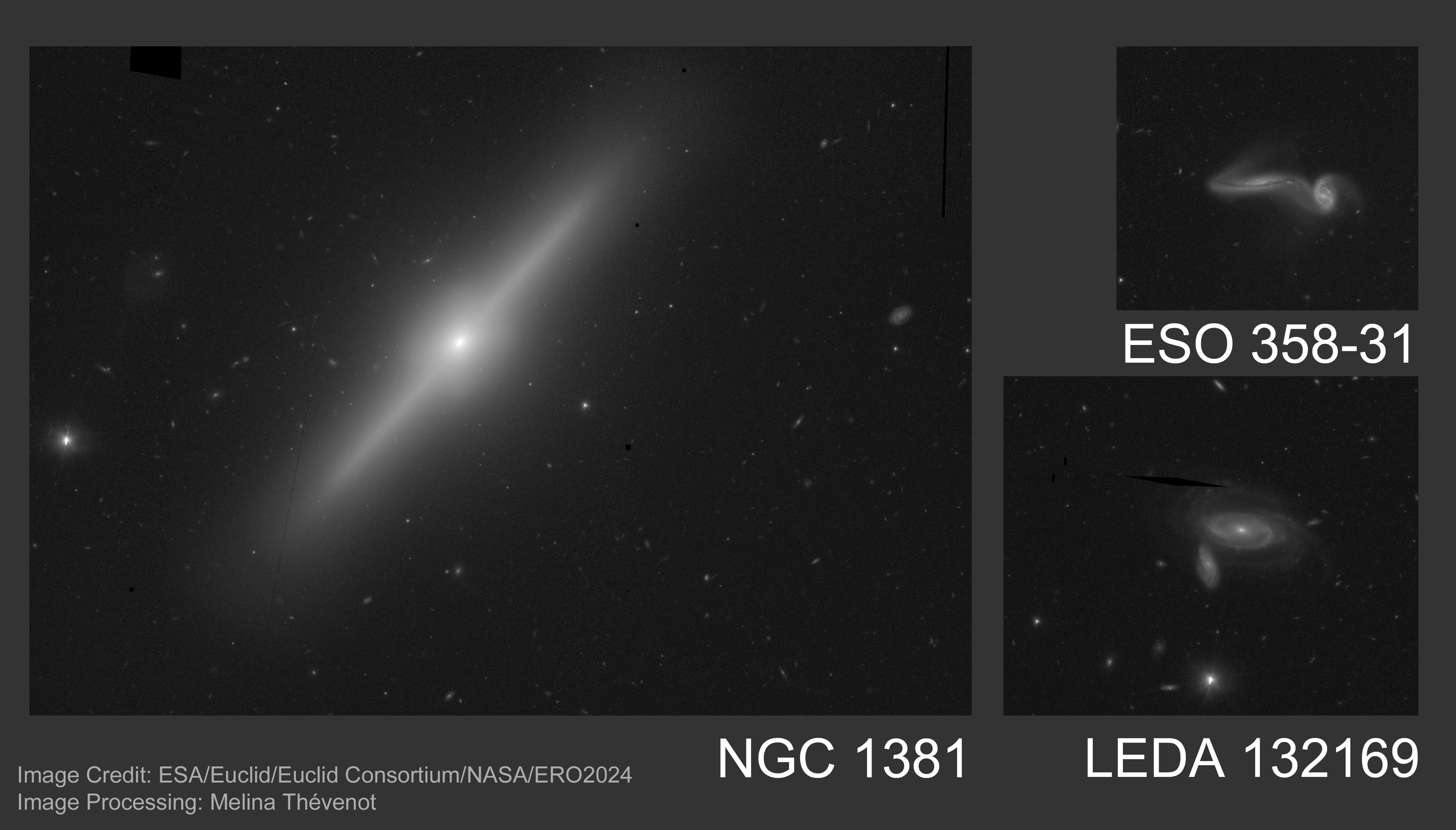
- NGC 1381 and two other galaxies in Fornax with Euclid

Observation data (J2000 epoch)
- Constellation: Fornax
- Right ascension: 03^{h} 36^{m} 31.7^{s}
- Declination: −35° 17′ 43″
- Redshift: 0.005751 ± 0.000030
- Heliocentric radial velocity: 1,724 ± 9 km/s
- Distance: 58.8 ± 10.2 Mly (18.0 ± 3.1 Mpc)
- Group or cluster: Fornax Cluster
- Apparent magnitude (V): 11.5

Characteristics
- Type: SA0
- Apparent size (V): 2.7′ × 0.7′

Other designations
- ESO 358- G029, MCG -06-09-003, PGC 13321

NGC 1381 is a lenticular galaxy located in the constellation Fornax. It is located at a distance of about 60 million light years from Earth, which, given its apparent dimensions, means that NGC 1381 is about 55,000 light years across. It is a member of the Fornax Cluster. NGC 1381 appears edge-on and features a thin disk with high surface brightness and a boxy bulge. Both the box-shaped bulge and the kinematics of the central area of the galaxy suggest that NGC 1381 has a bar.

NGC 1381 was discovered by Johann Friedrich Julius Schmidt on January 19, 1865. Julius Schmidt was then director of the National Observatory of Athens and he was inspecting the Cape catalogue nebulae with a 6 ft refractor. Along with NGC 1381, he also discovered the nearby galaxies NGC 1382, NGC 1386, NGC 1389, and NGC 1428. The publication of their discovery was delayed by 10 years and was published in 1876 with the work Über einige im Cape-Catalog fehlende Nebel.

NGC 1381 lies at the core of the Fornax Cluster. It lies within a region with increased density of candidate globular clusters nearly half a degree across that connects the elliptical galaxy NGC 1399 with its surrounding galaxies like NGC 1404, NGC 1387, and NGC 1380B. This structure is considered to be the result of the interactions between the cluster galaxies. A region with intracluster light has also being discovered between NGC 1381, NGC 1387, and NGC 1379. It is suggested that it was created by the tidal stripping of stars and globular clusters from the galaxies.

== Supernova ==
One supernova has been observed in NGC 1381:

- SN 2022ffv (Type Ia, mag 13.3) was discovered by ASAS-SN on 27 march 2022.
