= NGC 4630 =

Irregular galaxy in the constellation Virgo

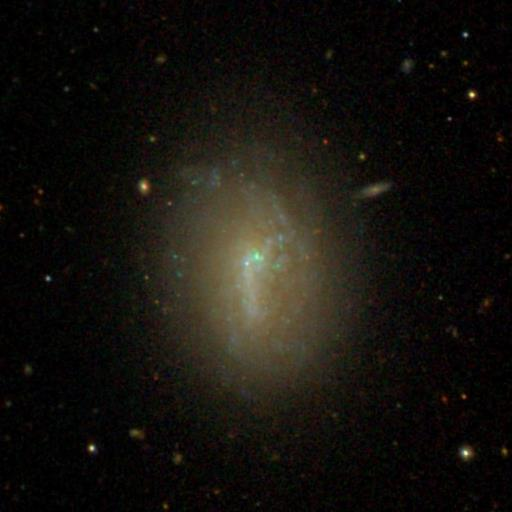
- SDSS image of NGC 4630.

Observation data (J2000 epoch)
- Constellation: Virgo
- Right ascension: 12^{h} 42^{m} 31.1^{s}
- Declination: 03° 57′ 37″
- Redshift: 0.002458/737 km/s
- Distance: 53,823,000 ly
- Group or cluster: Virgo II Groups
- Apparent magnitude (V): 13.15

Characteristics
- Type: IB(s)m
- Size: ~29,292.76 ly (estimated)
- Apparent size (V): 1.8 x 1.3

Other designations
- PGC 42688, UGC 7871, VCC 1923

NGC 4630 is an irregular galaxy located about 54 million light-years away in the constellation of Virgo. NGC 4630 was discovered by astronomer William Herschel on February 2, 1786. NGC 4630 is part of the Virgo II Groups which form a southern extension of the Virgo Cluster.

== See also ==
- List of NGC objects (4001–5000)
- NGC 1427A
