= NGC 1369 =

Galaxy of the Fornax Cluster

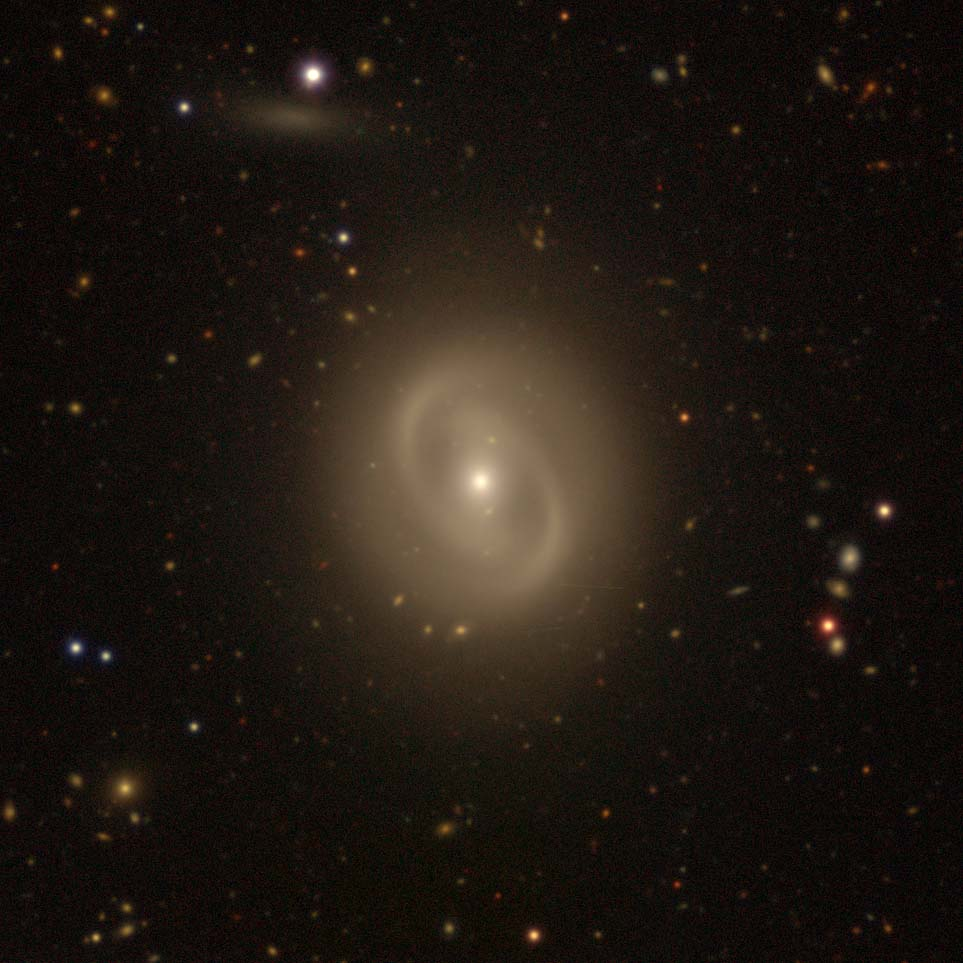
- legacy surveys image of NGC 1369.

Observation data (J2000 epoch)
- Constellation: Eridanus (constellation)
- Right ascension: 03^{h} 36^{m} 45.2737^{s}
- Declination: −36° 15′ 22.660″
- Redshift: 0.004763
- Heliocentric radial velocity: 1428 km/s
- Distance: 64.2 ± 4.5 Mly (19.69 ± 1.38 Mpc)
- Group or cluster: Fornax Cluster
- Apparent magnitude (V): 13.74

Characteristics
- Type: SB0/a(rs)
- Mass: 0.68×10^{10} (Stellar mass) /3.5×10^{10} (Total Mass) M_{☉}
- Size: ~25,800 ly (7.91 kpc) (estimated)
- Apparent size (V): 1.5 x 1.4

Other designations
- ESO 358- G 034, FCC 176, MCG -06-09-004, PGC 13330

NGC 1369 is a barred lenticular galaxy located 59 million light years away in constellation of Eridanus. The galaxy was discovered by astronomer Julius Schmidt on January 19, 1865, and is a member of the Fornax Cluster. NGC 1369 is a host to a supermassive black hole with an estimated mass of 1.8 million solar masses.

Surrounding NGC 1369 is a population of a least 11 known globular clusters.

== Physical characteristics ==
In the disk of NGC 1369, there are two bright, diffuse spiral arms which break of a relatively weak bar structure. These arms quickly fade in the diffuse outer disk. Despite the presence of spiral arms, the galaxy is very red which actually makes NGC 1369 a lenticular galaxy. Also, the galaxy is devoid of atomic and molecular gas, and does not show any indications of ionised-gas emission as a result of star formation. Observations in X-rays have shown that it is infalling in a transional region of the Fornax Cluster between the high and low-density regions of the cluster where the X-ray emission is still present. As a result, ram-pressure stripping would have acted to stop star formation once the galaxy entered into the cluster core, causing it to transion from a spiral galaxy to a lenticular galaxy.

== Supernova ==
One supernova has been observed in NGC 1369: SN 1969A (type unknown, mag. 17) was discovered by Enrique Chavira on 8 January 1969.

== See also ==
- List of NGC objects (1001–2000)
- NGC 1386
