= IC 2006 =

Elliptical galaxy in the Fornax Cluster

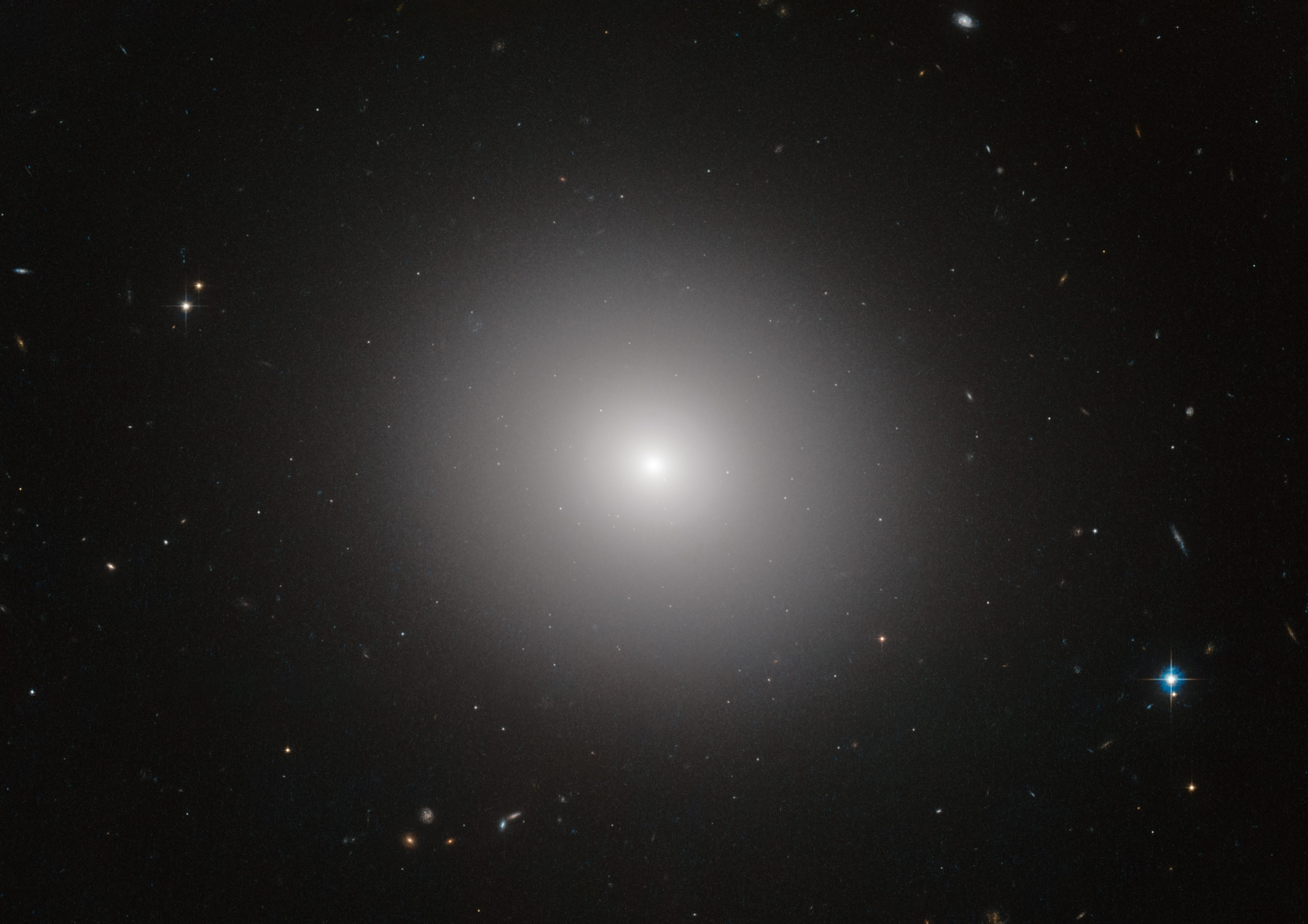
- IC 2006, imaged by the Hubble Space Telescope

Observation data (J2000 epoch)
- Constellation: Eridanus
- Right ascension: 03^{h} 54^{m} 28.427^{s}
- Declination: −35° 58′ 01.75″
- Redshift: 0.004610
- Heliocentric radial velocity: 1382
- Distance: 65.36 ± 0.46 Mly (20.04 ± 0.14 Mpc)
- Group or cluster: Fornax Cluster
- Apparent magnitude (B): 12.39

Characteristics
- Type: E1
- Size: 35 000 light-years in diameter
- Apparent size (V): 2.1′ × 1.8′
- Notable features: Early-type galaxy

Other designations
- AM 0532-360, MGC-06-09-037, PGC 14077

IC 2006 is an elliptical galaxy in the constellation Eridanus. The galaxy was discovered on 3 October 1897 by the American astronomer Lewis A. Swift. It is estimated to be around 60 to 70 million light years (20 megaparsecs) away, in the Fornax Cluster. The galaxy is one of the smaller in the Fornax cluster, with a diameter of only 35 000 light-years.

IC 2006 is an early-type galaxy with a Hubble classification of E1, but has also been listed as a lenticular galaxy with a morphological type of SA0^{−}. Despite their name, early-type galaxies are much older than spiral galaxies, and mostly comprise old, red-colored stars. Very little star formation occurs in these galaxies; the lack of star formation in elliptical galaxies appears to start at the center and then slowly propagates outward. Its age is estimated to be 8.1 ± 1.7 billion years.

An image taken by the Hubble Space Telescope in 2015 shows a characteristically smooth profile, with no spiral arms. However, IC 2006 has a ring surrounding it. The ring appears to rotate in a direction opposite to the rest of the body, but this may be explained by a polar ring with an elliptical shape.

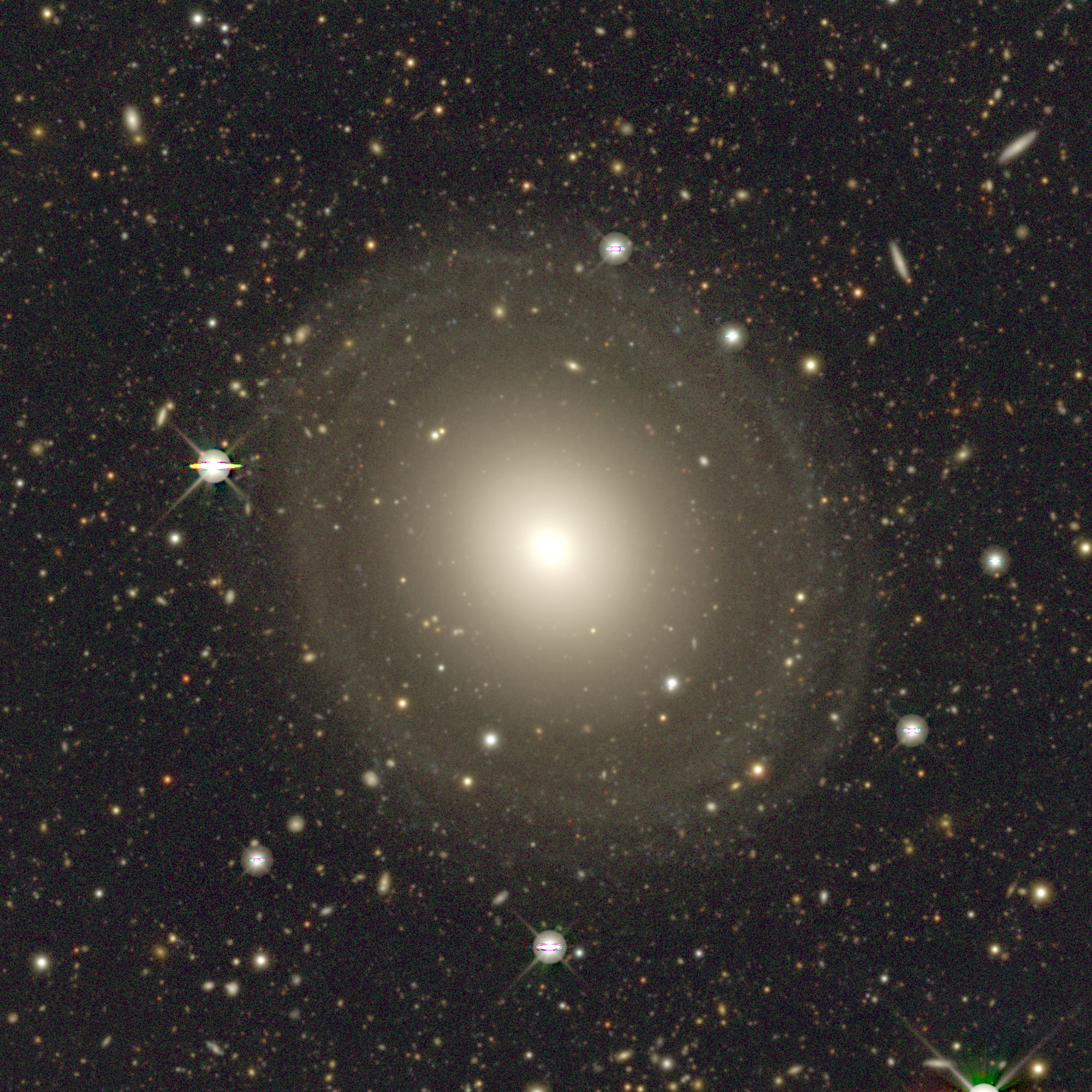
ground-based image from the DESI legacy imaging survey, showing the ring around the galaxy
