= Fornax Cluster =

Galaxy cluster in the constellation Fornax

- VLT Survey Telescope image of the Fornax Galaxy Cluster

Observation data (Epoch J2000)
- Constellation(s): Fornax & Eridanus
- Right ascension: 3^{h} 38^{m}
- Declination: −35° 27′
- Brightest member: NGC 1316
- Number of galaxies: 58
- Binding mass: (7±2)×10^{13} M_{☉}

Other designations
- NGC 1399 Group, Abell S0373 or AGC 3733, G53, LGG 96

The Fornax Cluster is a cluster of galaxies lying at a distance of 19 megaparsecs (62 million light-years). It has an estimated mass of (7±2)×10^{13} solar masses, making it the second richest galaxy cluster within 100 million light-years, after the considerably larger Virgo Cluster. It may be associated with the nearby Eridanus Group. It lies primarily in the constellation Fornax, with its southern boundaries partially crossing into the constellation of Eridanus, and covers an area of sky about 6° across or about 28 sq degrees.

The Fornax Cluster is a particularly valuable source of information about the evolution of such clusters due to its relatively close proximity to the Sun. It also shows the gravitational effects of a merger of a galaxy subgroup with the main galaxy group, which in turn lends clues about the associated galactic superstructure. At the centre of the cluster lies NGC 1399. Other cluster members include NGC 1316 (the group's brightest galaxy), NGC 1365, NGC 1427A, NGC 1427 and NGC 1404.

== Structure ==
Fornax can be divided into two subclusters: the main cluster, centered on NGC 1399, and a subgroup 3 degrees to the southwest centered on the lenticular galaxy NGC 1316 that is currently in the process of infalling with the largest subcluster to merge with it, and whose galaxies are experiencing relatively strong star formation activity.

== Intracluster medium ==
As with many other galaxy clusters, Fornax intracluster medium is filled with a hot, rarefied gas that emits X-rays. and contains a number of intergalactic stars, some of which have produced novae.

== List of cluster members ==
Cluster Members
Designation	Coordinates (Epoch J2000)		Apparent magnitude	Type	Mean Angular diameter (arcminutes)	Diameter (x1000 Light-years)	Distance (mly)	Recessional velocity (km/s)
Designation	Right Ascension	Declination	Apparent magnitude	Type	Mean Angular diameter (arcminutes)	Diameter (x1000 Light-years)	Distance (mly)	Recessional velocity (km/s)
ESO 357-07	03 10.4	−33 09	14.7	SBm	2.2′	40		981
ESO 357-12	03 16.9	−35 32	14.8	SBcd	2.2′	40		1445
IC 1913	03 19.6	−32 28	14.5	SBb	2.1′	40	67	1318
NGC 1310	03 21.1	−37 06	13	SBc	1.9′	35	64	1640
LEDA 12625	03 22.1	−37 35	?	Irr	2.9′	55		1507
NGC 1316	03 22.7	−37 12	9.4	(R')SAB(s)0	11.5′	215	62	1664
NGC 1317	03 22.7	−37 06	11.9	SBa	3.0′	55	70	1935
NGC 1326	03 23.9	−36 28	11.5	S0	4.3′	80	63	1247
NGC 1326A	03 25.1	−36 22	14.7	SBm	1.7′	30	84	1719
NGC 1326B	03 25.3	−36 23	13.7	SBm	3.5′	65	46	888
IC 1919	03 26.0	−32 54	13.9	E	1.6′	30	61	1158
NGC 1336	03 26.5	−35 43	13.4	E	1.9′	35	65	1360
NGC 1341	03 28.0	−37 09	13.3	SBab	1.6′	30	86	1760
NGC 1339	03 28.1	−32 17	12.8	E	1.9′	35	64	1240
NGC 1344	03 28.3	−31 04	11.2	E	5.6′	105	60	1052
ESO 358-09	03 28.8	−35 11	14.2	SBbc	2.3′	45		1241
ESO 358-10	03 29.7	−33 33	14.8	E	1.5′	30		1620
NGC 1351	03 30.6	−34 51	12.4	E-S0	3.2′	60	69	1420
NGC 1350*	03 31.1	−33 38	11.2	Sa(r)	5.8′	130	87	1905
NGC 1365	03 33.6	−36 08	10.3	(R')SBb(s)b	11.0′	205	56	1636
NGC 1366	03 33.9	−31 12	13.1	S0	1.9′	35	56	1137
NGC 1374	03 35.3	−35 14	11.0	E	2.7′	50	59	1240
NGC 1375*	03 35.3	−35 16	12.2	SB0 pec	2.1′	23	28	643
IC 335	03 35.5	−34 27	13.4	S0	2.3′	45	60	1530
NGC 1379	03 36.1	−35 26	11.9	E	2.6′	50	60	1264
NGC 1380	03 36.5	−34 59	9.9	S0	4.8′	85	60	1737
NGC 1381	03 36.5	−35 18	11.5	S0	2.6′	55	60	1673
NGC 1369	03 36.8	−36 15	13.6	Sa	1.7′	30	65	1340
NGC 1386	03 36.8	−36 00	11.2	(R′)SA(r)0/a	3.4′	65	53	868
NGC 1380A	03 36.8	−34 44	13.4	S0	2.5′	45	72	1419
NGC 1387	03 37.0	−35 30	10.8	(R')SAB(s)0	3.2′	60	53	1296
NGC 1382	03 37.1	−35 12	13.8	E	1.5′	30	80	1697
NGC 1389	03 37.2	−35 45	12.6	E	2.6′	50	42	883
NGC 1396	03 38.6	−35 27	13.8	E	0.7′	7	67	853
NGC 1399	03 38.5	−35 26	9.9	E	6.8′	130	66	1335
NGC 1404	03 38.9	−35 36	10.9	E	4.1′	75	65	1942
NGC 1406	03 39.4	−31 19	12.9	SBbc	3.9′	75	50	963
NGC 1427A	03 40.1	−35 38	13.4	Irr	2.1′	40	52	2028
ESO 358-50	03 41.1	−33 47	13.9	S0	1.6′	30		1151
ESO 358-51	03 41.5	−34 53	14.1	Sa	1.5′	30		1626
NGC 1425	03 42.2	−29 54	11.4	SA(rs)b	6.0′	115	69	1402
NGC 1427	03 42.3	−35 24	11.8	E	3.6′	70	71	1327
NGC 1428	03 42.4	−35 09	14.0	E	1.5′	30	75	1602
NGC 1437A	03 43.0	−36 16	14.2	SBd	1.7′	30	41	798
NGC 1436	03 43.6	−35 51	11.7	SBab	2.8′	50	58	1296
ESO 358-60	03 45.2	−35 34	15.6	Irr	1.7′	30		710
NGC 1437B	03 45.9	−36 22	14.0	Sc	2.5′	45	69	1415
NGC 1460	03 46.2	−36 42	13.5	SB0	1.7′	30	63	1341
PGC 13809	03 46.3	−34 57	12.6	Sc	4.8′	90		1838
IC 1993	03 47.1	−33 42	12.6	(R')SA(s)bc	2.5′	45	50	1057
ESO 302-09	03 47.6	−38 35	14.6	SBd	2.2′	40		908
ESO 302-14	03 51.7	−38 27	15.5	Irr	1.5′	30		798
ESO 359-03	03 52.0	−33 28	14.1	Sab	1.8′	35		1495
NGC 1484	03 54.3	−36 58	13.9	Sb	2.5′	45	48	952
IC 2006	03 54.3	−35 58	12.5	E	1.9′	35	65	1382
NGC 1531	04 11.2	−32 51	12.9	S0	1.3′	15	57	1169
NGC 1532	04 12.1	−32 52	10.7	SBb	12.6′	210	57	

(*) - Membership is uncertain

== Gallery ==
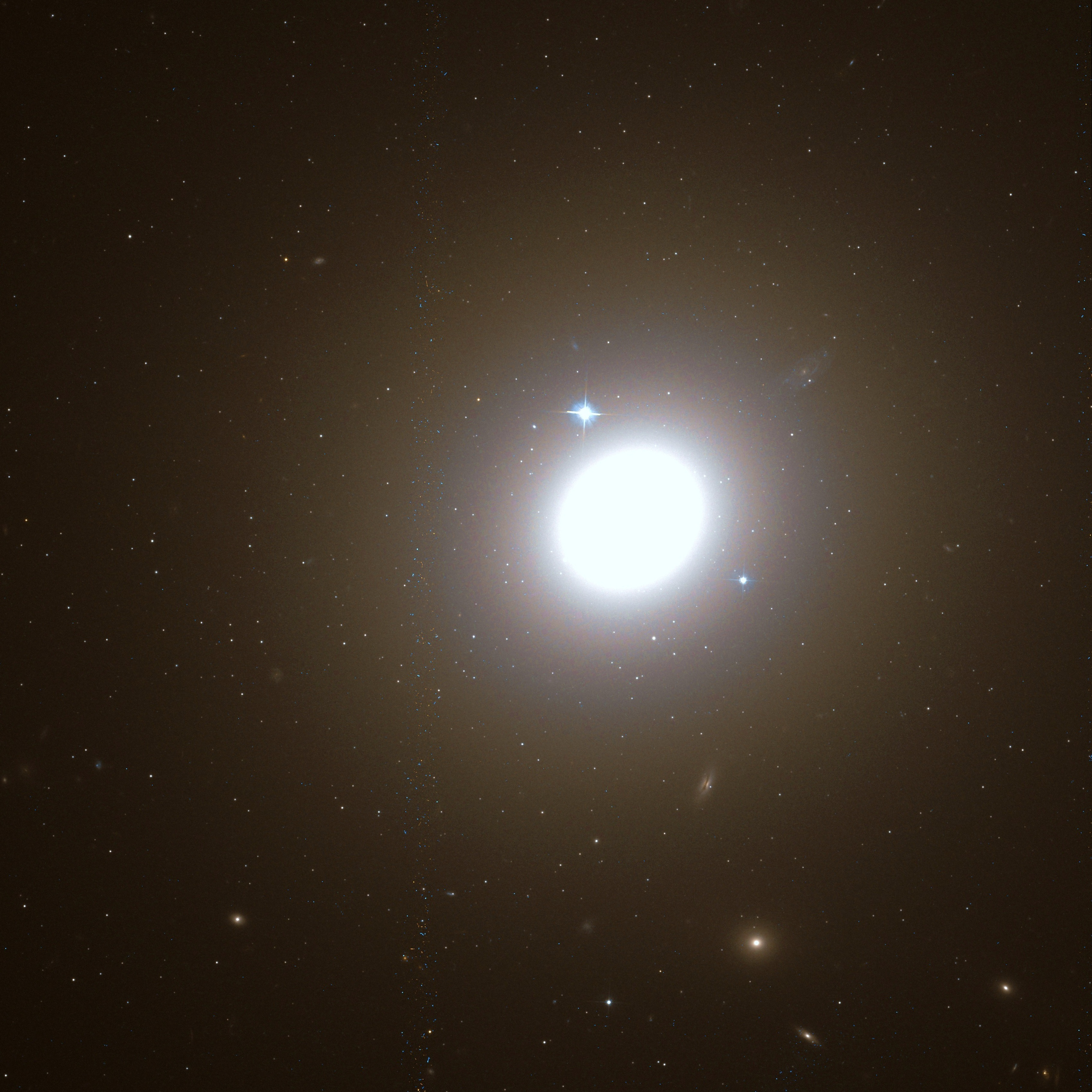
NGC 1399 galaxy by the HST; 2.76′ view.

== See also ==
- List of galaxy groups and clusters
- Coma Cluster
- Eridanus Cluster
- Norma Cluster
- Virgo Cluster
- NGC 1365
