= NGC 1419 =

Galaxy in the constellation Eridanus

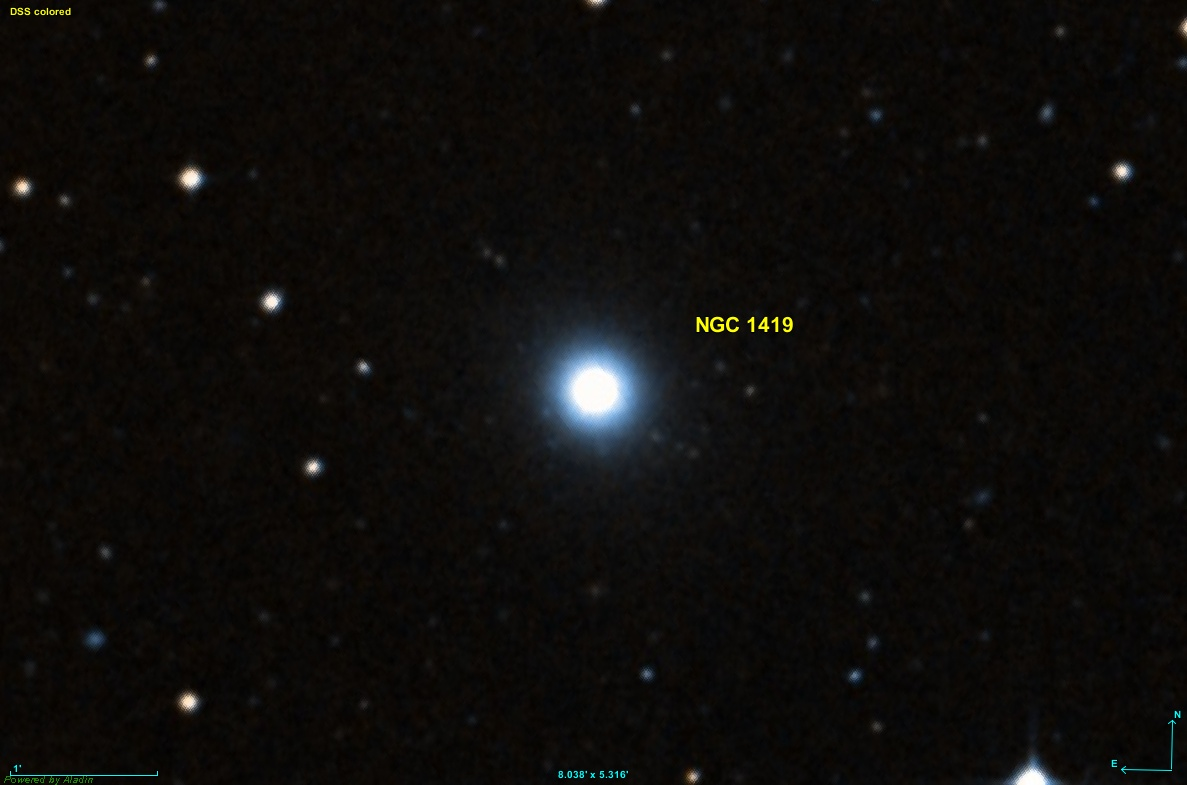
- DSS image of NGC 1419.

Observation data (J2000 epoch)
- Constellation: Eridanus
- Right ascension: 03^{h} 40^{m} 42.1^{s}
- Declination: −37° 30′ 39″
- Redshift: 0.005240
- Heliocentric radial velocity: 1571 km/s
- Distance: 62 Mly (18.9 Mpc)
- Group or cluster: Fornax Cluster
- Apparent magnitude (V): 13.5
- Absolute magnitude (V): −17.5

Characteristics
- Type: E
- Mass: 6×10^{9} (Total Mass) M_{☉}
- Size: ~25,300 ly (7.75 kpc) (estimated)
- Apparent size (V): 1.1 x 1.1

Other designations
- ESO 301- G 023, FCC 249, PGC 013534, MCG -06-09-017

NGC 1419 is an elliptical galaxy located 62 million light years away in the constellation of Eridanus. The galaxy was discovered by astronomer John Herschel on October 22, 1835, and is a member of the Fornax Cluster. NGC 1419 is a host to a supermassive black hole with an estimated mass of 25 million solar masses.

155 known globular clusters have been observed surrounding NGC 1419, along with 21 planetary nebulae. These planetary nebulae reveal that the distance to NGC 1419 is approximately 18.9 Mpc, while measurements using surface brightness fluctuations reveal that NGC 1419 is approximately 22.9 ± 0.9 Mpc away. The measurements using planetary nebulae confirm that NGC 1419 is a member of the Fornax Cluster.

== See also ==
- List of NGC objects (1001–2000)
