= NGC 1386 =

Galaxy in the constellation Eridanus

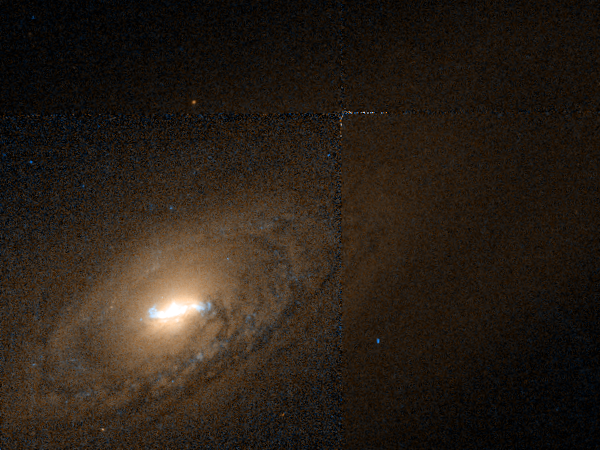
- NGC 1386 by the Hubble Space Telescope

Observation data (J2000 epoch)
- Constellation: Eridanus
- Right ascension: 03^{h} 36^{m} 46.2^{s}
- Declination: −35° 59′ 58″
- Redshift: 0.002895 ± 0.000017
- Heliocentric radial velocity: 868 ± 5 km/s
- Distance: 52.6 ± 2.3 Mly (16.2 ± 0.7 Mpc)
- Group or cluster: Fornax Cluster
- Apparent magnitude (V): 11.2

Characteristics
- Type: (R′)SA(r)0/a
- Apparent size (V): 3.4′ × 1.3′
- Notable features: Seyfert galaxy

Other designations
- ESO 358- G035, FCC 179, MCG -06-09-005, PGC 13333

NGC 1386 is a spiral galaxy located in the constellation Eridanus. It is located at a distance of about 53 million light years from Earth, which, given its apparent dimensions, means that NGC 1386 is about 50,000 light years across. It is a Seyfert galaxy, the only one in Fornax Cluster.

== Observation history ==
NGC 1386 was discovered by Johann Friedrich Julius Schmidt on January 19, 1865. Julius Schmidt was then director of the National Observatory of Athens and he was inspecting the Cape catalogue nebulae with a 6 ft refractor. Along with NGC 1386, he also discovered the nearby galaxies NGC 1381, NGC 1382, NGC 1389, and NGC 1428. The publication of their discovery was delayed by 10 years and was published in 1876 with the work Über einige im Cape-Catalog fehlende Nebel.

== Characteristics ==
NGC 1386 is seen nearly edge-on and it has been classified both as a spiral and as a lenticular galaxy. It features a spiral pattern with dust lanes. No HII regions are visible in the images of the Carnegie Atlas of Galaxies, however HII emission has been detected in the arms. Dust features have also being observed at the central region of the galaxy. Based on observations by the Herschel Space Telescope the total dust mass of NGC 1386 is estimated to be 10^{6.78} M_{☉} and the stellar mass 10^{10.5} M_{☉}. The galaxy has two ring structures, with diameters of 0.5 and 1.67 arcminutes.

=== Active galactic nucleus ===
NGC 1386 has an active galactic nucleus (AGN) that has been categorised as a type 2 Seyfert galaxy. It is one of the nearest Seyfert galaxies. The source of nuclear activity in galaxies is suggested to be material accretion around a supermassive black hole in the galactic centre. The black hole in the centre of NGC 1386 is estimated to be 2.6×10^{7} M_{☉} based on stellar velocity dispersion.

The central region of NGC 1386 has three distinct kinematic components. The first has low velocity dispersion (approximately 90 km/s) and is identified as gas rotating in the galaxy disk. The second is observed in the inner 150 pc around the continuum peak and has two components, one redshifted and one blueshifted, which are identified as a bipolar outflow with an outflow rate of 0.1 M_{☉} per year. The third element appears in velocity residual images and could be gas streaming inwards along the spiral. The galaxy disk has elevated emission at the location it intersects with the radiation from the AGN.

Observations in 8.4 GHz radio waves by the Very Large Array reveal the presence of a linear radio feature extending to the south of the nucleus and a marginally detectable north extension. The brightest part of the south extension is 0".52 from the central source. Ionised gas is detected north and south of the nucleus in a position similar to the radio emission but a comparison with optical images shows no direct association. A linear feature has also been observed by Hubble Space Telescope in [O III] and [N II] + Hα with similar characteristics as the radio one. An emission plume extending for one arcsecond east-northeast of the nucleus was also observed. No trace of polycyclic aromatic hydrocarbon (PAH) emission has been detected in mid-infrared observations of the central 20 pc of NGC 1386, while there is mild silicate absorption, which may be associated with a dust torus around the AGN.

The Fornax Cluster by VLT Survey Telescope. NGC 1386 can be seen at lower centre left.

Observations by BeppoSAX and Chandra X-Ray Observatory suggested that the nucleus of NGC 1386 is obscured by a Compton thick column, with high column density, estimated to be (5±1)×10^{24} cm^{−2} as measured by NuSTAR. The observations imply that the torus covers much of the nucleus. The torus obscures much of the soft X-ray spectrum, but harder X-rays, as indicated by the Fe-Kα line manage to get through and be observed. NGC 1386 has a corona with faint diffuse soft X-ray emission that appears distorted at its outer parts.

NGC 1386 has been found to host a cosmic water maser. It also features a HII region at the circumnuclear region. The border between the narrow-line region that is photionisated by the AGN, and the surrounding HII regions is estimated to be at 6 arcseconds form the nucleus. That corresponds to 310 parsecs at the distance of NGC 1386. A faint, inclined ring of emission extending up to 12 arcseconds from the nucleus can be seen in [N II] + Hα images, indicating also the presence of HII regions in the circumnuclear region.

== Nearby galaxies ==
NGC 1386 is considered to be part of the Fornax Cluster. However, the redshift of NGC 1386 is smaller than that of the cluster and this has led to the assumption it is a foreground galaxy. Makarov and Karachentsev grouped NGC 1386 in the NGC 1386 group, along with NGC 1389 and NGC 1396.

== See also ==
- NGC 4945 - another near type 2 Seyfert galaxy
