= NGC 1326 =

Galaxy in the constellation Fornax

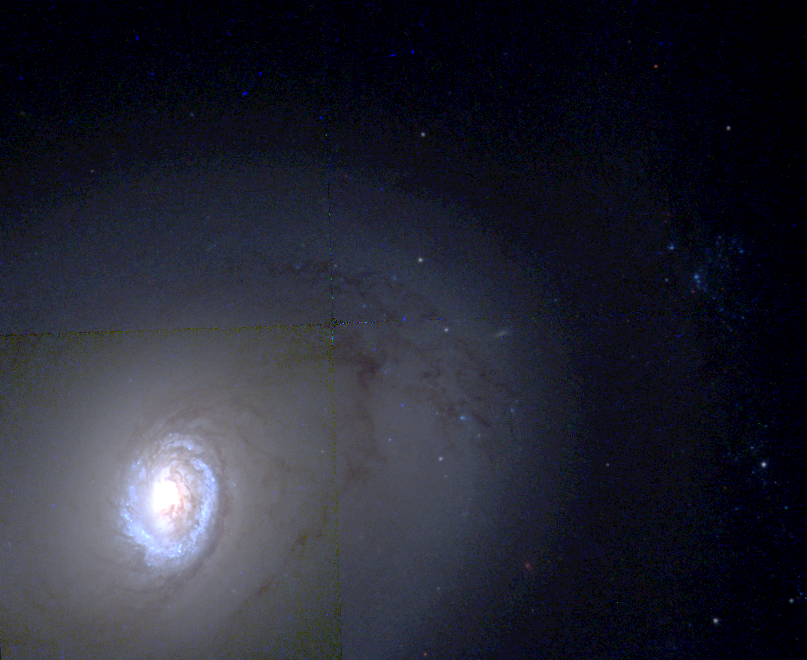
- HST image of NGC 1326

Observation data (J2000 epoch)
- Constellation: Fornax
- Right ascension: 03^{h} 23^{m} 56.397^{s}
- Declination: −36° 27′ 52.78″
- Redshift: 0.004584
- Heliocentric radial velocity: 1371 km/s
- Distance: 52 Mly (16 Mpc)
- Apparent magnitude (V): 10.54
- Apparent magnitude (B): 11.43

Characteristics
- Type: (R_{1})SAB(r)0/a

Other designations
- MCG -06-08-011, PGC 12709

NGC 1326 is a lenticular galaxy in the constellation Fornax, 63 million light-years away. It was discovered by English astronomer John Herschel on 29 November 1837. It is a member of the Fornax Cluster, an NGC 1316 subgroup and has a diameter of 70 000 light-years.

NGC 1326 is an early-type lenticular galaxy with a Hubble classification of S0, but it is very different from other early-type lenticulars in the Fornax Cluster. NGC 1326 has a nuclear ring.

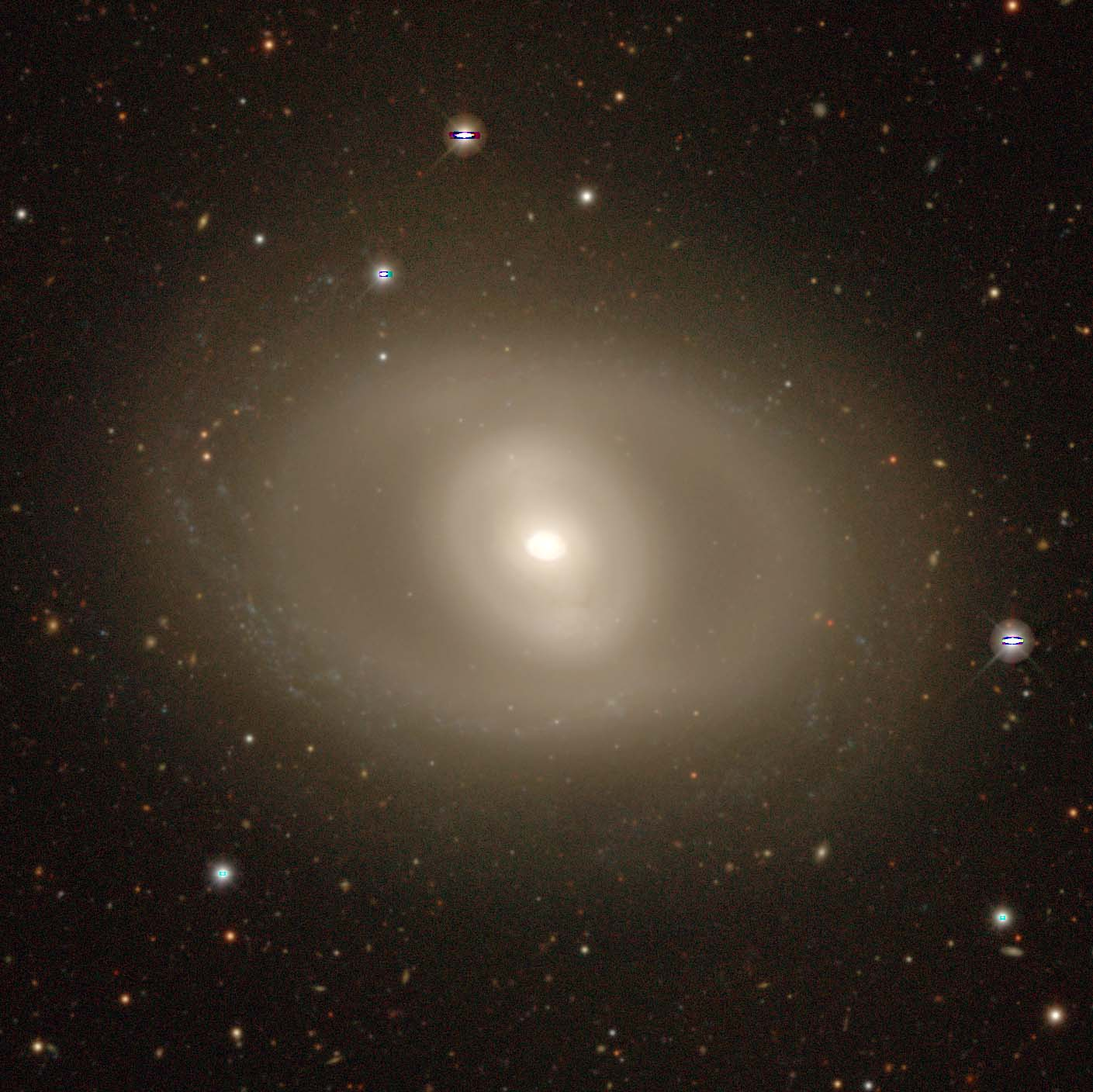
Complete image of NGC 1326 with the legacy surveys
