= NGC 1351 =

Galaxy in the Fornax Cluster

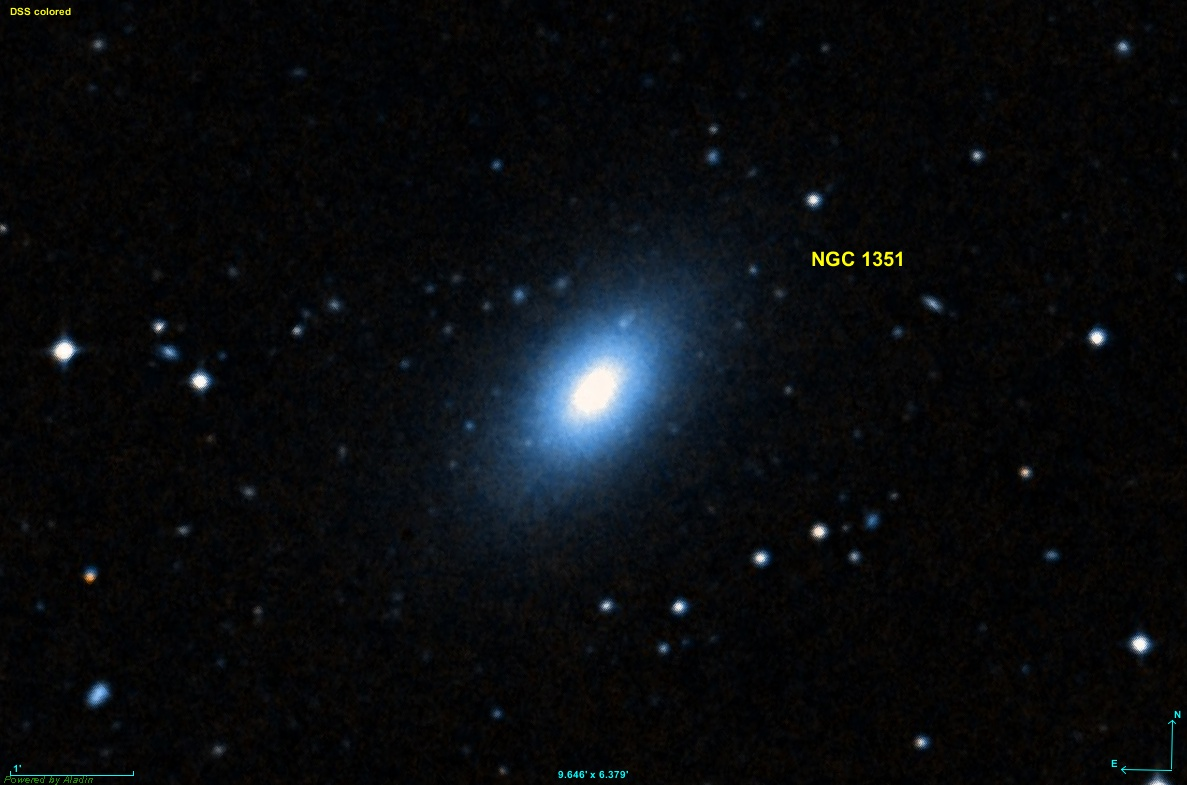
- NGC 1351 (DSS)

Observation data (J2000 epoch)
- Constellation: Fornax
- Right ascension: 03^{h} 30^{m} 35^{s}
- Declination: −34° 51′ 14″
- Redshift: 0.00507
- Distance: 20.8 Mpc (67.8 Mly)
- Apparent magnitude (V): 11.46
- Absolute magnitude (V): −20.07

Characteristics
- Type: E-S0
- Apparent size (V): 2.2′ × 3.4′

Other designations
- ESO 358-12, PGC 13028, FCC 83, MCG -6-8-22

NGC 1351 is a lenticular galaxy in the constellation Fornax. It has a redshift of z=0.00505, and its distance from Earth can be estimated as 21 million parsecs (68 million light-years). It is elongated in shape, and was discovered by John Herschel on October 19, 1835.

The diameter of the galaxy is about 33 kpc, which makes it a medium-size galaxy, and smaller than the Milky Way. It is a member of the Fornax Cluster, a cluster of approximately 200 galaxies. The galaxy possesses a bright nucleus at its center.

It is currently receding from the Solar System at a velocity of 1514 km/s, and 1410 km/s from the cosmic microwave background.

== See also ==
- NGC 1399 – a large elliptical galaxy positioned near NGC 1351
- NGC 1365 – a double barred spiral galaxy positioned near NGC 1351
