= NGC 1406 =

Galaxy in the constellation Fornax

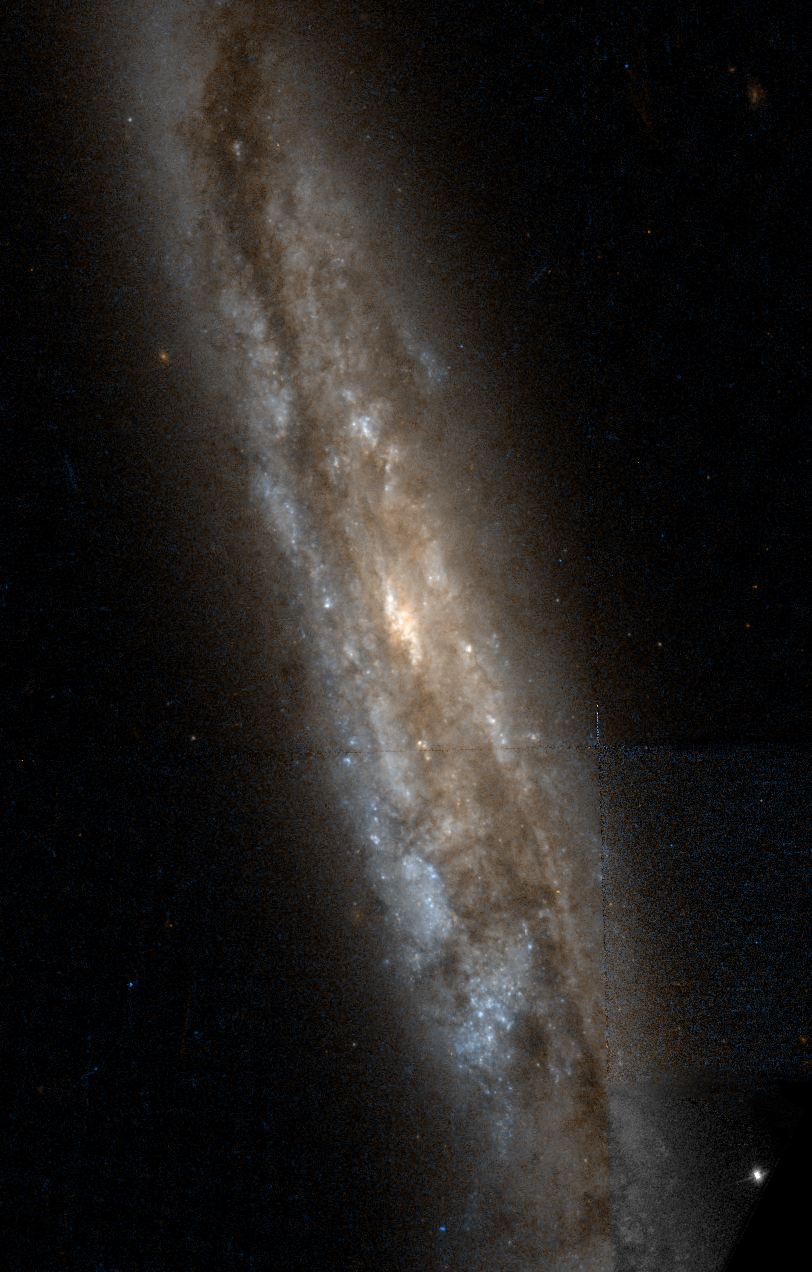
- Hubble Space Telescope image of NGC 1406

Observation data (J2000 epoch)
- Constellation: Fornax
- Right ascension: 03^{h} 39.2^{m}
- Declination: −31° 19′
- Redshift: 1076 ± 10
- Distance: 15.3 megaparsecs (50 Mly)
- Apparent magnitude (V): 11.8

Characteristics
- Type: SBbc
- Apparent size (V): 3.9′ × 0.7′
- Notable features: Edge-on barred spiral galaxy

Other designations
- ESO 418-15, IRAS 03373-3129, MCG -5-9-20, PGC 13458, UGCA 83

NGC 1406 is almost edge-on barred spiral galaxy in constellation Fornax. It was discovered by John Herschel on 18 November 1835.

It is a member of Fornax Cluster, a cluster of 200 galaxies. At a distance of 50 million light-years, it is one of the closest members of the Fornax Cluster. NGC 1406 has a Hubble classification of SBbc, which indicates it is a barred spiral galaxy. It is also edge-on, making its bar hard to see. NGC 1406 has much dust in its disc, which is visible on the Hubble image in the box upper right.

Its size on night sky is 3.9' x 0.7' which is proportional to real size of 57,000 light-years. This means NGC 1406 is one of the larger galaxies in Fornax Cluster. It is north and distant from central galaxy NGC 1399, so it positions in the Fornax Cluster is at the edge of it.
