= NGC 1484 =

Galaxy in the constellation Eridanus

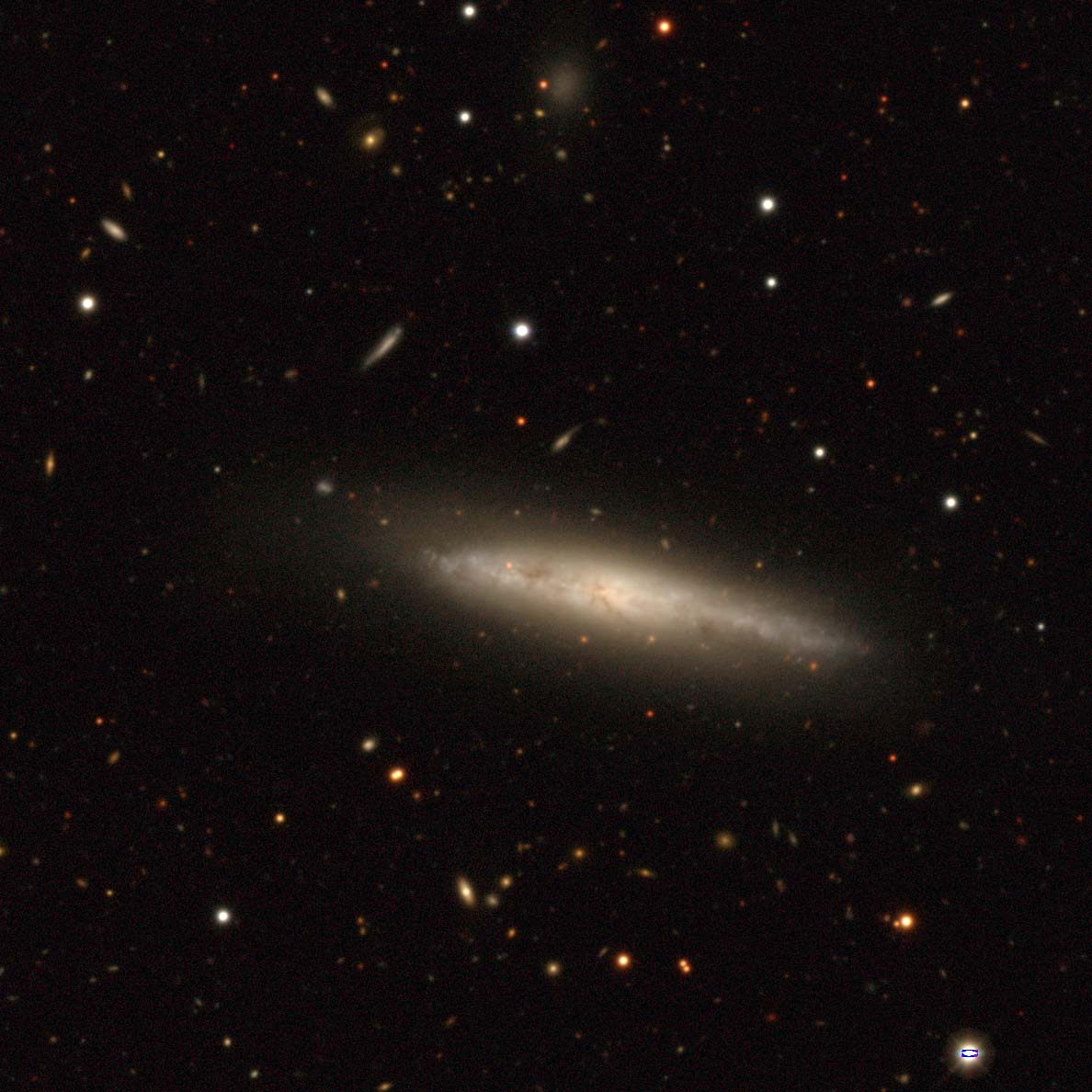
- Legacy surveys image of NGC 1460

Observation data (J2000.0 epoch)
- Constellation: Eridanus
- Right ascension: 03^{h} 54^{m} 20.1^{s}
- Declination: −36° 58′ 08″
- Redshift: 0.003469
- Heliocentric radial velocity: 1040 km/s
- Distance: 49 Mly (14.9 Mpc)
- Apparent magnitude (V): 13.93
- Absolute magnitude (B): -19.21 ± 0.20

Characteristics
- Type: SB(s)b?
- Mass: 3.8×10^{9} (Stellar mass) M_{☉}
- Size: 35,638 light years (estimated)
- Apparent size (V): 2.5 x 0.6

Other designations
- ESO 359- G 006, MCG -06-09-036, PGC 014071

NGC 1484 is a barred spiral galaxy approximately 50 million light-years away from Earth in the constellation of Eridanus. It was discovered by astronomer John Herschel on November 28, 1837. NGC 1484 is a member of the Fornax cluster.

Its distance and size on the night sky convert to an approximate size of 35,638 light years, only a third or one-quarter the size of the Milky Way Galaxy.

== See also ==
- List of NGC objects (1001–2000)
