= NGC 1425 =

Galaxy in the constellation Fornax

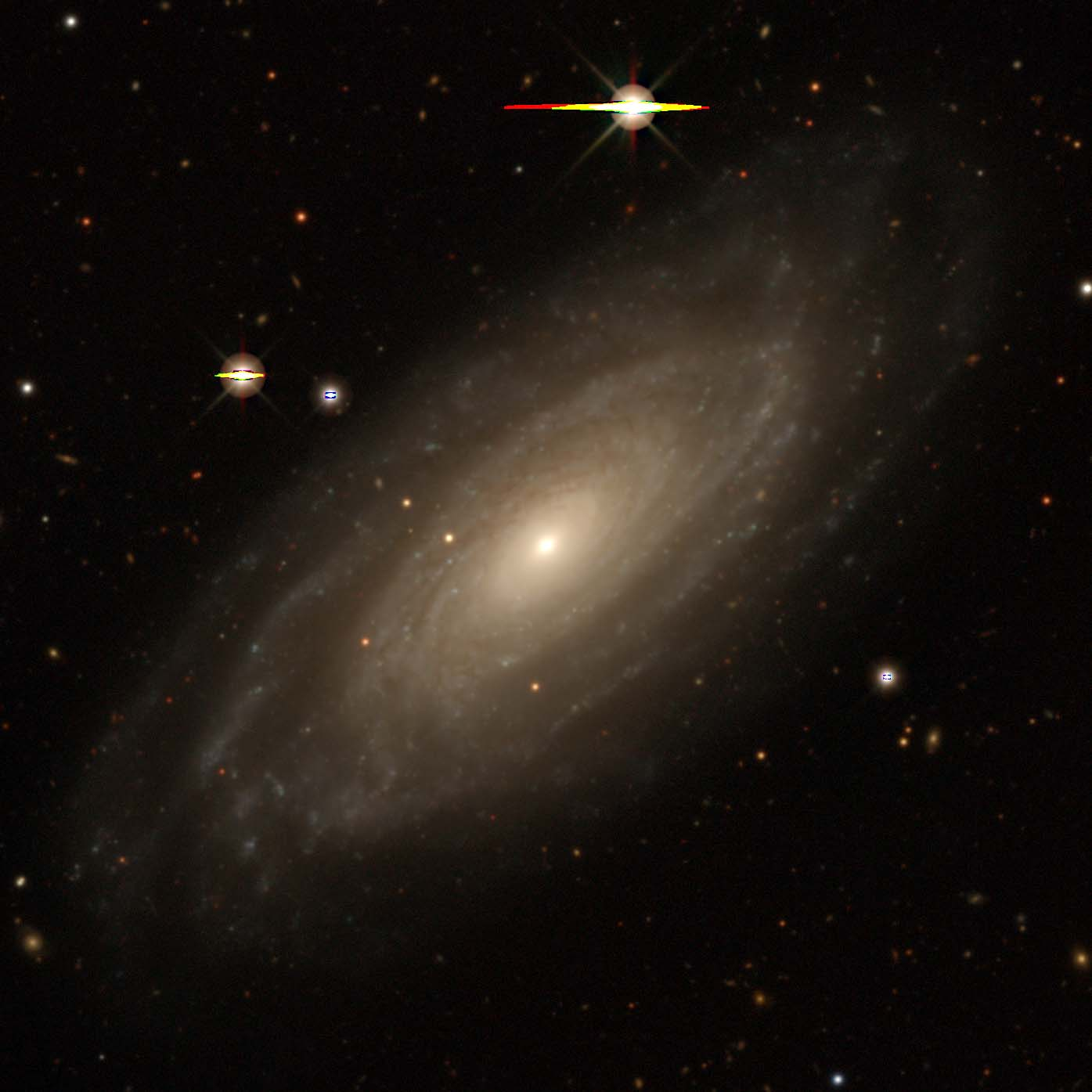
- Legacy Surveys image of NGC 1425

Observation data (J2000 epoch)
- Constellation: Fornax
- Right ascension: 03^{h} 42^{m} 11.50^{s}
- Declination: −29° 53′ 41.0″
- Redshift: 0.005045±0.000011
- Apparent magnitude (V): 10.6

Characteristics
- Type: SA(rs)b
- Size: 174,000 ly
- Apparent size (V): 6.0 x 2.63
- Notable features: Visible spiral arms visible

Other designations
- NGC 1425, IC 1988, UGCA 84, ESO 419- G 004, IRAS 03401-3002, MCG-05-09-023, LEDA 13602

NGC 1425, also known as IC 1988, is a spiral galaxy around 71 million light-years away in the constellation Fornax. It was discovered by William Herschel on Oct 9, 1790, and it belongs to the Fornax cluster.

== See also ==
- List of NGC objects (1001–2000)
