= NGC 1310 =

Galaxy in the constellation Fornax

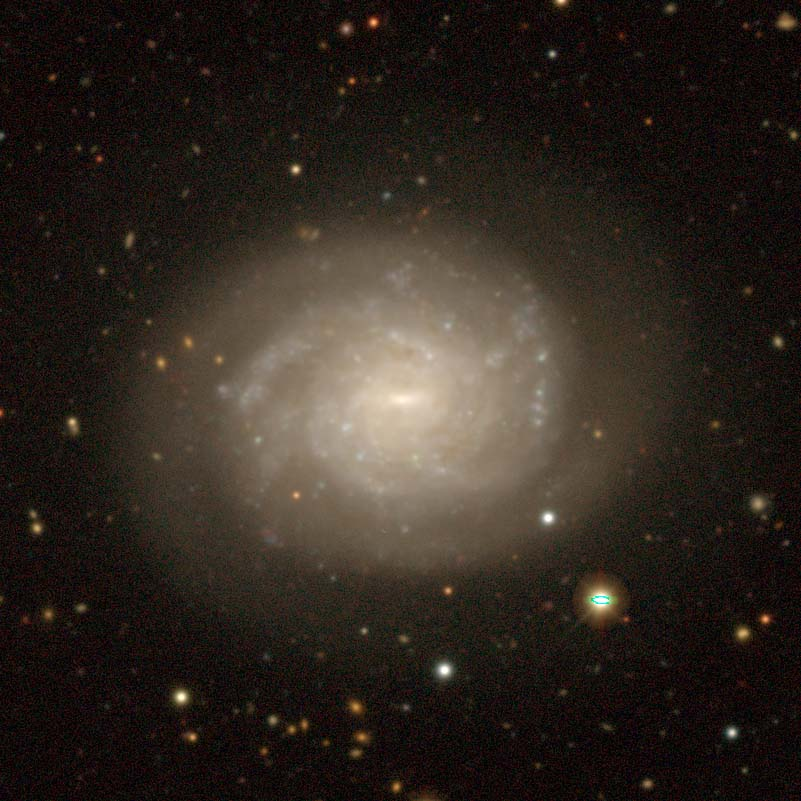
- legacy surveys image of NGC 1310

Observation data (J2000 epoch)
- Constellation: Fornax
- Right ascension: 03^{h} 21^{m} 03.4^{s}
- Declination: −37° 06′ 06″
- Redshift: 0.005874
- Heliocentric radial velocity: 1756 km/s
- Distance: 72 Mly (22 Mpc)
- Group or cluster: Fornax Cluster
- Apparent magnitude (V): 12.08
- Apparent magnitude (B): 12.98

Characteristics
- Type: SBc II
- Size: 35,000 ly

Other designations
- FCC 13, MCG -06-08-004, PGC 12569

NGC 1310 is a barred spiral galaxy located in the southern constellation of Fornax. It was discovered by English astronomer John Herschel on 22 October 1835.

At a distance of 72 million light-years (22 Mpc) away from the Sun, NGC 1310 is a member of the Fornax A subgroup of the Fornax Cluster of galaxies.

One supernova has been observed in NGC 1310: SN 1965J was discovered by Gibson Reaves on 31 August 1965. It was about 14 arcseconds east and 7 arcseconds south of the center of the galaxy.
