= NGC 1436 =

Galaxy in the constellation Eridanus

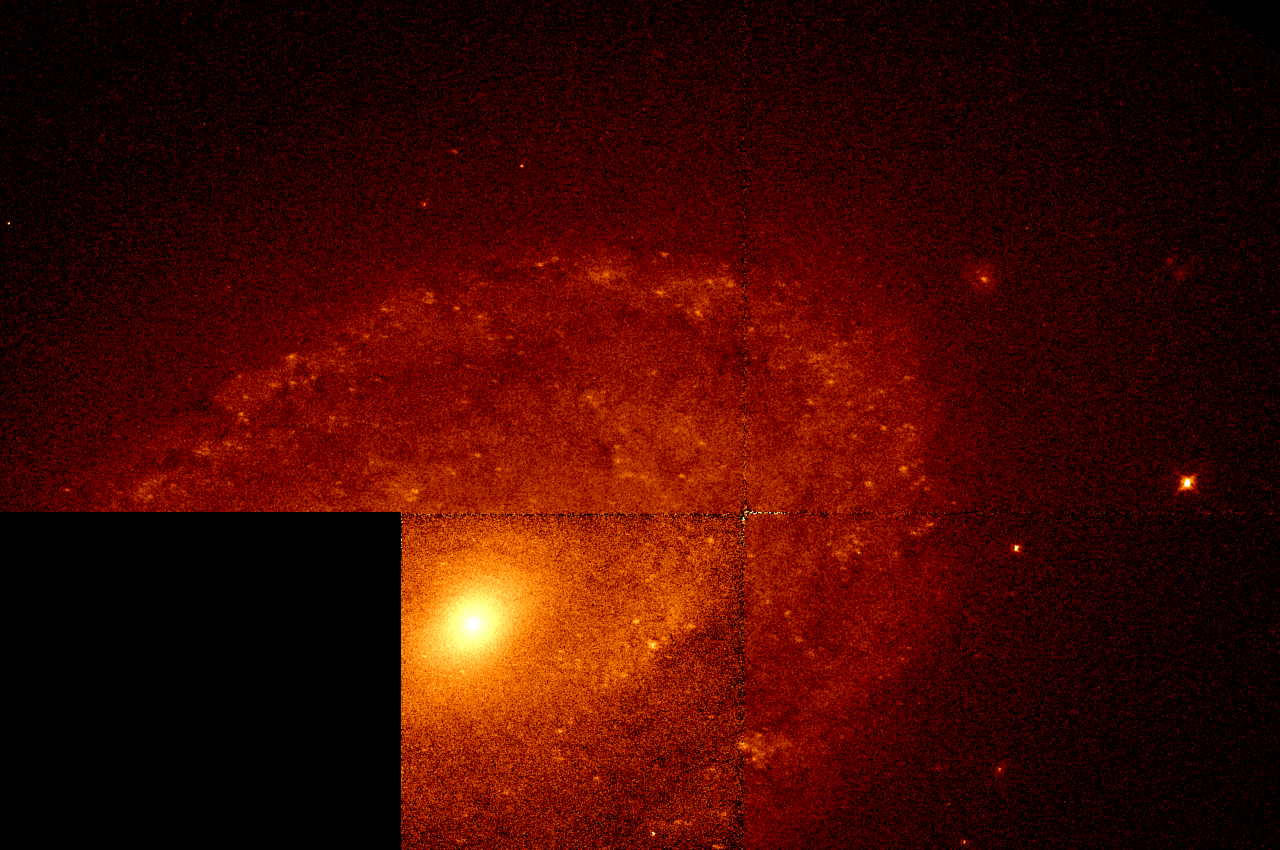
- NGC 1436 / NGC 1437 (NASA/ESA HST)

Observation data (J2000.0 epoch)
- Constellation: Eridanus
- Right ascension: 03^{h} 43^{m} 37.08^{s}
- Declination: −35° 51′ 10.90″
- Redshift: 0.004627
- Heliocentric radial velocity: 1387 ± 8 km/s
- Distance: 58 Mly (17.8 Mpc)
- Apparent magnitude (V): 11.7
- Apparent magnitude (B): 12.5
- Absolute magnitude (B): −19.00

Characteristics
- Type: (R')SAB(rs)ab
- Mass: 6.4×10^{9} (Stellar mass)/2.03×10^{10} (Total Mass) M_{☉}
- Size: ~76,000 ly (23.31 kpc) (estimated)
- Apparent size (V): 3.1 x 2.0

Other designations
- NGC 1437, PGC 13687, MCG -6-9-25, ESO 358-58, FCC 290

NGC 1436 (also called NGC 1437) is a barred spiral galaxy with LINER activity approximately 58 million light-years away from Earth in the constellation of Eridanus. NGC 1436 is a flocculent spiral galaxy lying almost face-on to the Earth. It is a member of the Fornax I cluster.

NGC 1436 is host to a nuclear star cluster with an estimated mass of around 2 × 10^{7} M_{☉}, and is also host to a supermassive black hole with an estimated mass of around 3.2 × 10^{6} M_{☉}.

== Observational history ==
This galaxy was entered twice in the New General Catalogue, first as NGC 1436 and after that as NGC 1437. It was discovered by John Herschel on January 9, 1836, who described it as "very bright, and evidently a globular cluster". It later received designation NGC 1436. It was also observed by Scottish astronomer James Dunlop with his 9" reflector at Parramatta, who described it as "a pretty large faint round nebula, about 3.5' diameter, gradual slight condensation to the centre, very faint at the margin".

John Herschel observed this object again on November 28, 1837, assumed it was new and measured an accurate position. It later received second designation in the New General Catalogue (NGC 1437) because of that.

Until recently this galaxy was often called NGC 1437, but in recent references it is being called NGC 1436 more and more frequently.

== Physical characteristics ==
NGC 1436's spiral arms wind onto the bulge of the galaxy in a bar-like pattern. Within the spiral arms which are tightly wound, there is abundant dust with numerous star-forming regions. The spiral arms are propment within 2 arc minutes of the center but outside that range, they fade into a smooth and featureless disk, suggesting that the galaxy is transtioning into a lenticular galaxy. Addidtionally, the distubution of HI in the disk of the galaxy is truncated within only the inner star forming region of the galaxy which along with the morphology of the galaxy also agrees with the conclusion that the galaxy is transtioning into a lenticular galaxy as a result of the environment of the Fornax Cluster. Observations also show that the inner and outer regions of the disk of NGC 1436 experienced a burst of star formation around 5 billion years ago afterwards followed by a rapid quenching in the outer disc and by slow quenching in the inner disc, which continues to form stars to this day. It is therefore inferred that as NGC 1436 fell though the Fornax Cluster around 5 billion years ago the combination of a tidal interaction and/or ram pressure stripping was able to compress and then remove most of the HI gas from the outer region of the disk, causing a temporary increase of star formation followed by a rapid decrease of its star formation. The inner regions of the disk were much closer to the center of the galaxy which was affected more strongly by gravitational forces of the center of the galaxy which allowed the inner region of the disk to hold on to more of the HI gas. However, since the removal of HI gas from the outer regions of the disk of the galaxy as NGC 1436 fell though the cluster the accection of cold gas to replenish star formation in the inner disk stopped which is why star formation in the inner disk has decreased in the last few billion years but not to zero as star formation is still observed to be ongoing in that region.

== See also ==
- Types and morphology of galaxies
- List of NGC objects (1001–2000)
- Eridanus (constellation)
