= NGC 1317 =

Galaxy in the constellation Fornax

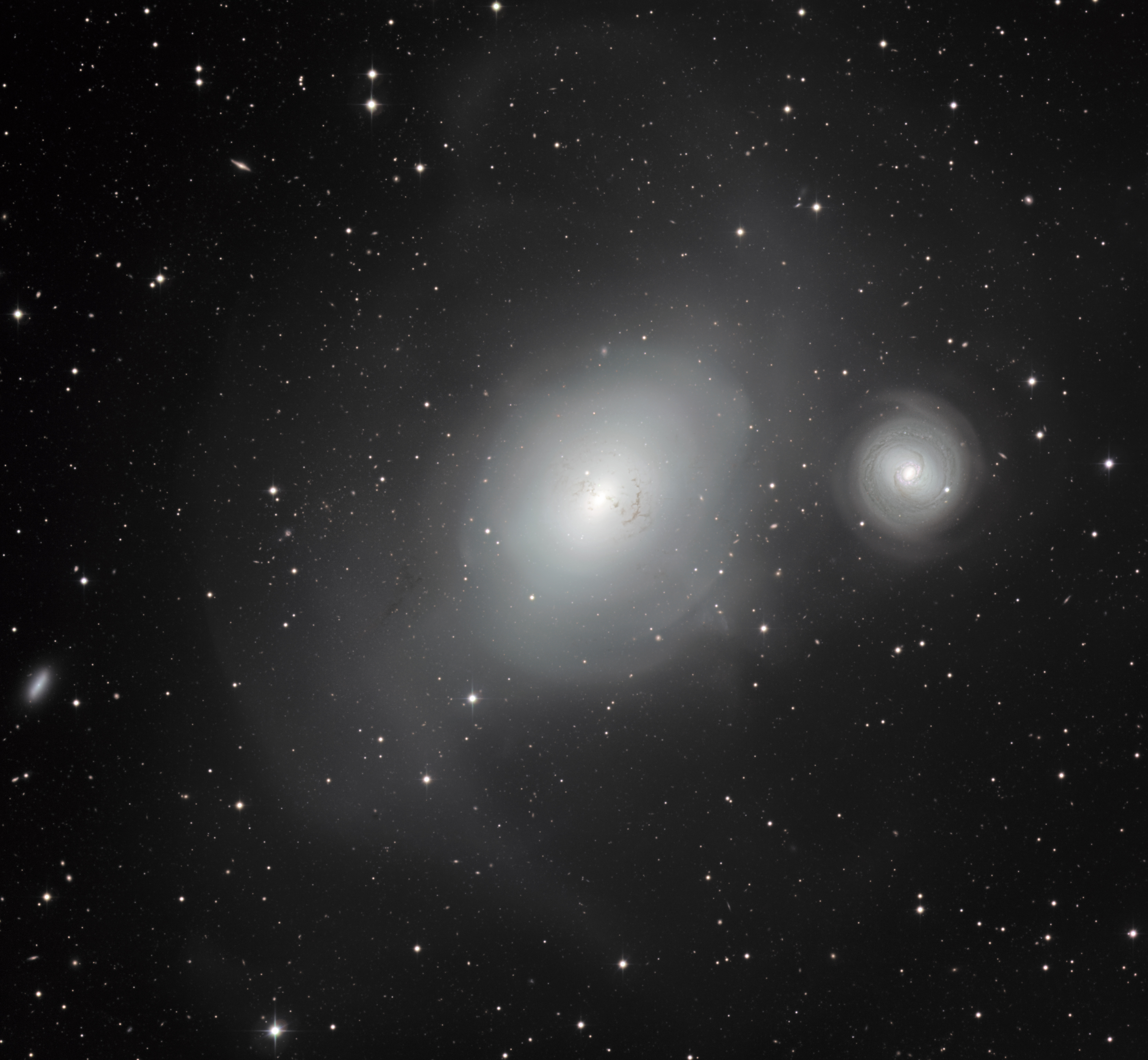
- The contrasting galaxies NGC 1316 and 1317

Observation data (J2000 epoch)
- Constellation: Fornax
- Right ascension: 03^{h} 38.5^{m}
- Declination: −35° 27′
- Distance: from 17 megaparsecs (55 Mly) to 26.9 megaparsecs (88 Mly)
- Apparent magnitude (V): 11.0

Characteristics
- Type: SBa
- Size: 36.18 kpc (118,000 ly) (diameter; D_{25} isophote)
- Apparent size (V): 2.8′ × 2.4′ (55,000 light-years in diameter)
- Notable features: Large uncertain of distance

Other designations
- ESO 357-23, IRAS 03208-3716, MCG -6-8-6, NGC 1318 and PGC 12653

NGC 1317 (also known as NGC 1318) is a barred spiral galaxy in the constellation Fornax, in the Fornax Cluster. It was discovered by Scottish astronomer James Dunlop on November 24, 1826. It appears to be interacting with the much larger NGC 1316, but uncertainty in distance estimates and scales of tidal distortions make this uncertain. It is a member of the NGC 1316 subgroup, part of the Fornax Cluster. Its size is 2.8' x 2.4' which, at the average distance, gives a diameter of 118,000 light-years.

== Distance estimates ==
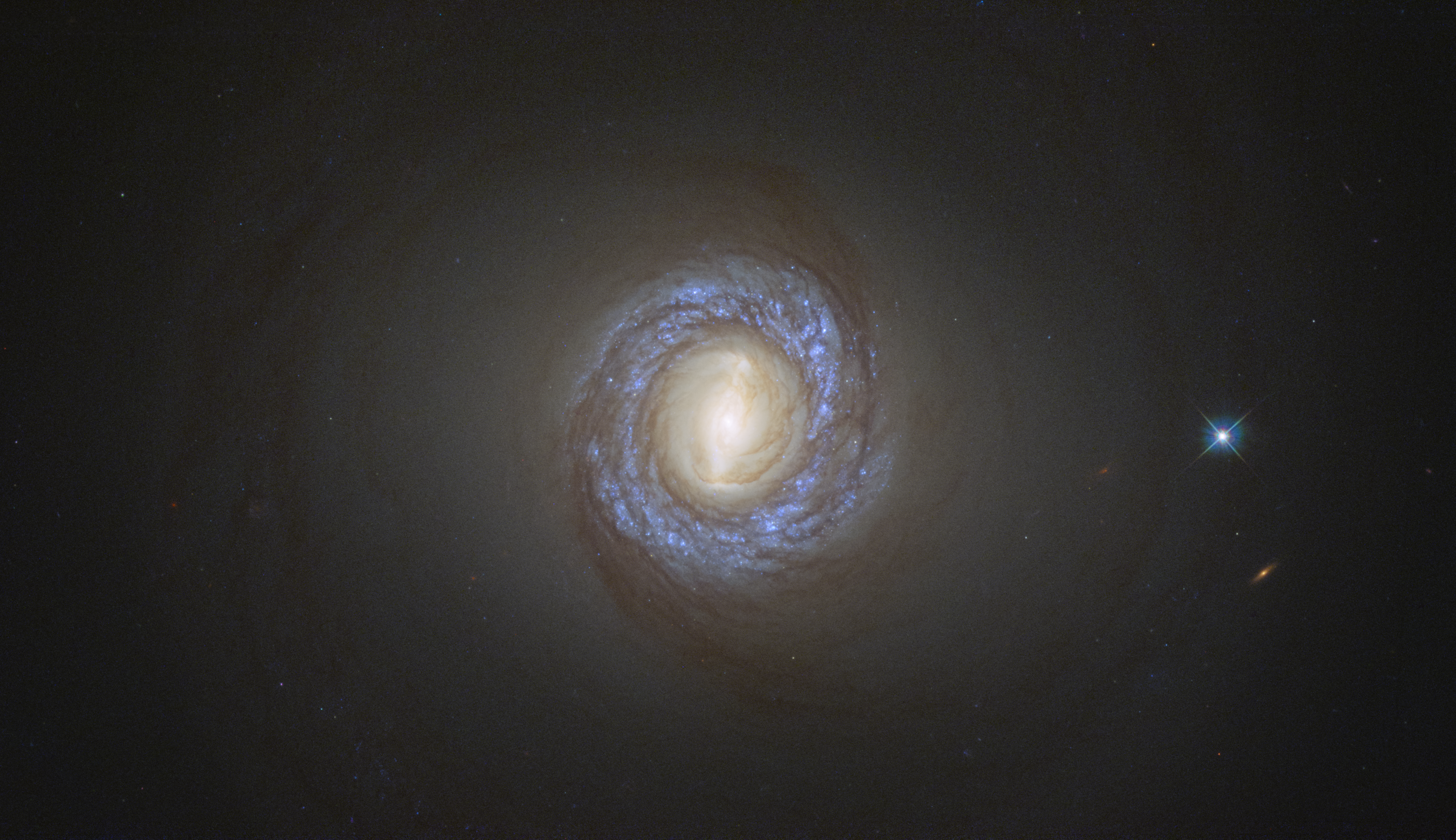
NGC 1317's central region by HST

NGC 1317 has an uncertain distance. Based on redshift, the distance is 55.1 million light-years, but some other methods estimate a distance as large as 88.4 million light-years. The distance of this galaxy is therefore somewhere between 55 and 88 Mly, but its true distance is unknown. The average distance between the two estimates is around 70 million light-years, which means NGC 1317 is also in the Fornax Cluster.
