= NGC 1427 =

Galaxy in the constellation Fornax

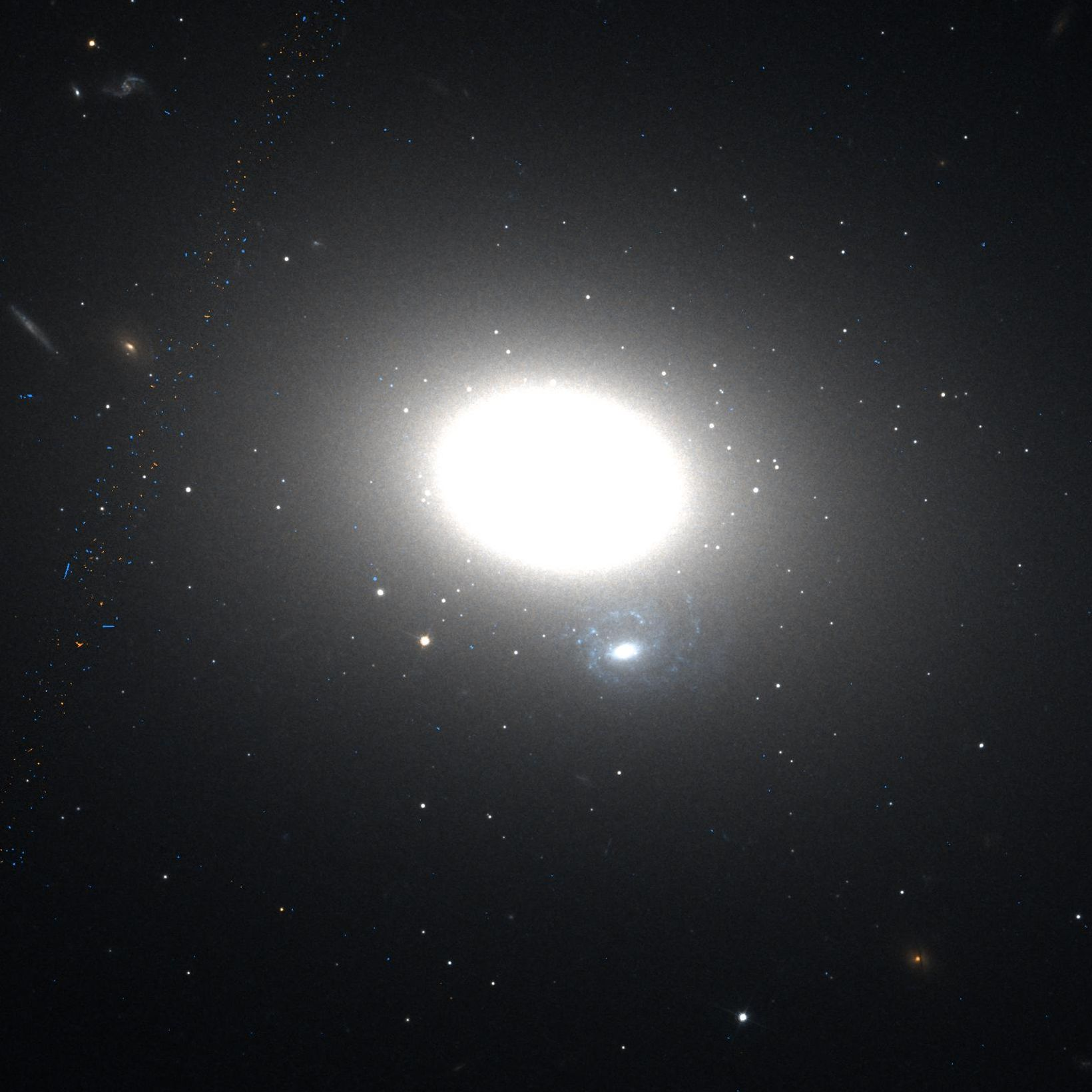
- Hubble Space Telescope image of NGC 1427

Observation data (J2000 epoch)
- Constellation: Fornax
- Right ascension: 03^{h} 42^{m} 19.4^{s}
- Declination: −35° 23′ 33″
- Redshift: 0.004630
- Heliocentric radial velocity: 1388 ± 3 km/s
- Distance: 71 ± 8 Mly (21.9 ± 2.4 Mpc)
- Group or cluster: Fornax Cluster
- Apparent magnitude (V): 11.8
- Absolute magnitude (V): −20.43

Characteristics
- Type: E5
- Mass: 7.9×10^{10} (Stellar mass)/9.4×10^{10} (Total Mass) M_{☉}
- Size: ~109,200 ly (33.49 kpc) (estimated)
- Apparent size (V): 3.6 x 2.5
- Notable features: Low-luminosity elliptical galaxy

Other designations
- ESO 358- G 052, MCG -06-09-021, FCC 276, PGC 13609

NGC 1427 is a low-luminosity elliptical galaxy located approximately 71 million light-years away from Earth. It was discovered by John Frederick William Herschel on November 28, 1837. It is a member of the Fornax Cluster. The galaxy has a stellar mass of 7.9 × 10^{10} M_{☉}, and a total mass of 9.4 × 10^{10} M_{☉}. However, the mass of the dark matter halo surrounding the galaxy is around 4.3 × 10^{12} M_{☉}.

== Characteristics ==
NGC 1427 is the brightest elliptical galaxy on the eastern side of the Fornax cluster, and is thought to have been accreted into the gravtional potential well of the cluster core more than 8 billion years ago. It is around 9 billion years old.

In the galaxy, dust patches are observed, with the central region being host to a nuclear stellar disk with an estimated diameter of 52 ly (16 pc). NGC 1427 is surrounded by 71 observed planetary nebulae.

The galaxy has a supermassive black hole with an estimated mass of 9.1 × 10^{7} M_{☉}.

=== Globular clusters ===
NGC 1427 is surrounded by a population of around 470 globular clusters, however estimates suggest that number may be as high as 510. It has a bimodal distribution of one population of metal-rich red clusters and another population of metal-poor blue clusters. The blue globular clusters have an abundance ratio of [Fe/H] = -1.02 ± 0.2, greater than that of the globular clusters in the halo of the Milky Way, while the red globular clusters have an abundance ratio of [Fe/H] = -0.15 making them more metal rich than the globular clusters in the bulge of the Milky Way. This suggests that the red globular clusters have more similarities to the metal-rich globular clusters found in disk galaxies unlike in giant elliptical galaxies like M87. Therefore, as the red globular clusters have a higher metallicity than the blue globular clusters, this suggests that red globular clusters are younger than the blue global clusters, possibly having formed from either galaxy mergers or other local galactic processes.

=== Galaxy mergers ===
Computer simulations and observations of the inner stellar halo of NGC 1427, by Zhu et al. suggest that the formation of the galaxy's stellar halo requires the merger of a massive satellite galaxy of around 1.5+1.6
−0.7×10^{10} M_{☉} with NGC 1427 which is about one-fourth of its current stellar mass.

Also, the stars in NGC 1427's stellar halo are younger than most stars in the bulge; with these stars being the youngest in the galaxy. The stellar age distribution of the hot inner stellar halo of NGC 1427 indicates that this merger occurred within the last 8 billion years. Based on current understanding of galaxy evolution, stars in the inner halo of NGC 1427 should have formed before the massive merger ended, either in a preexisting disk of NGC 1427 or in the satellite galaxy before and during the merger, because of the triggering of star formation.
