= NGC 1316 =

Galaxy in the constellation Fornax

Fornax A
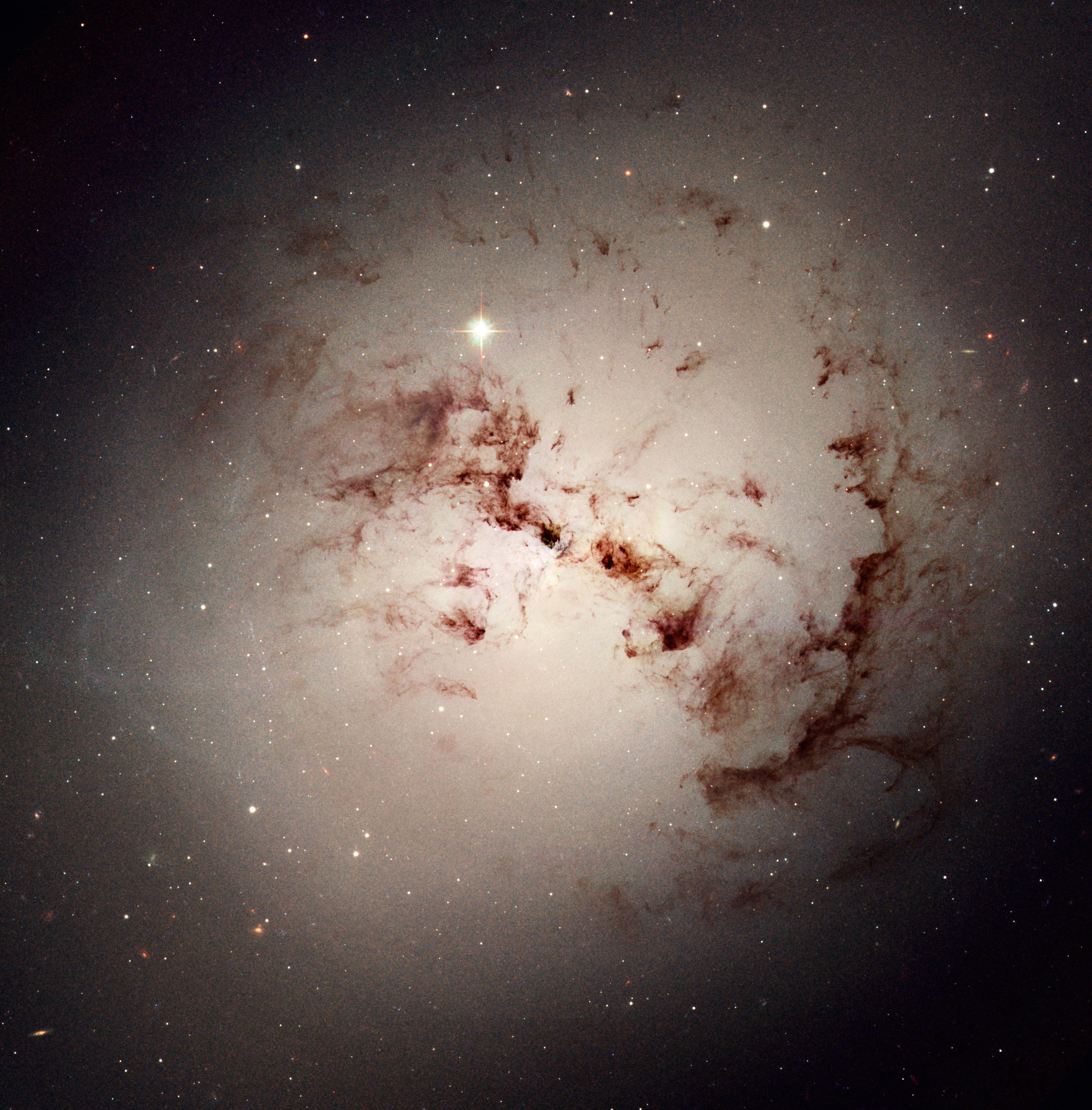
- NGC 1316 imaged by the Hubble Space Telescope

Observation data (J2000 epoch)
- Constellation: Fornax
- Right ascension: 03^{h} 22^{m} 41.7^{s}
- Declination: −37° 12′ 30″
- Redshift: 1760 ± 10 km/s
- Distance: 62.0 ± 2.9 Mly (19.0 ± 0.9 Mpc)^{[a]}
- Apparent magnitude (V): 9.4

Characteristics
- Type: (R')SAB(s)0^{0}
- Size: ~333,000 ly (101.89 kpc) (estimated)
- Apparent size (V): 12′.0 × 8′.5
- Notable features: Very bright at radio 1.4 GHz

Other designations
- Fornax A, ESO 357-22, IRAS 03208-3723, 2MASX J03224178-3712295, Arp 154, LEDA 12651, MCG -06-08-005, PGC 12651

NGC 1316 (also known as Fornax A) is a lenticular galaxy about 60 million light-years (18.4 million parsecs) away in the constellation Fornax. It is a radio galaxy and at 1400 MHz the fourth-brightest radio source in the sky. It was discovered by Scottish astronomer James Dunlop on 2 September 1826.

== Structure and formation ==
In the late 1970s, François Schweizer studied NGC 1316 extensively and found that the galaxy appeared to look like an elliptical galaxy with some unusual dust lanes embedded within a much larger envelope of stars. The outer envelope contained many ripples, loops, and arcs. He also identified the presence of a compact disk of gas near the center that appeared inclined relative to the stars and that appeared to rotate faster than the stars (the mass-to-light ratio run in the center of NGC 1316 resembles that of many other giant ellipticals). Based on these results, Schweizer considered that NGC 1316 was built up through the merger of several smaller galaxies. Such merger events may have fueled the central supermassive black hole, that has a mass estimated in 130–150 million solar masses with gas, causing the galaxy to become a radio galaxy. He also states that NGC 1316 is comparable to the giant elliptical galaxies found in the centers of other clusters of galaxies. Using spectroscopy of its brightest globular clusters, the merger is estimated to have occurred ~3 billion years ago. NGC 1316 spans about 50 000 light-years. It has been proposed too that NGC 1316 may be a galaxy in evolution that eventually will become a Sombrero-like system dominated by a large bulge.

== Companions and environment ==
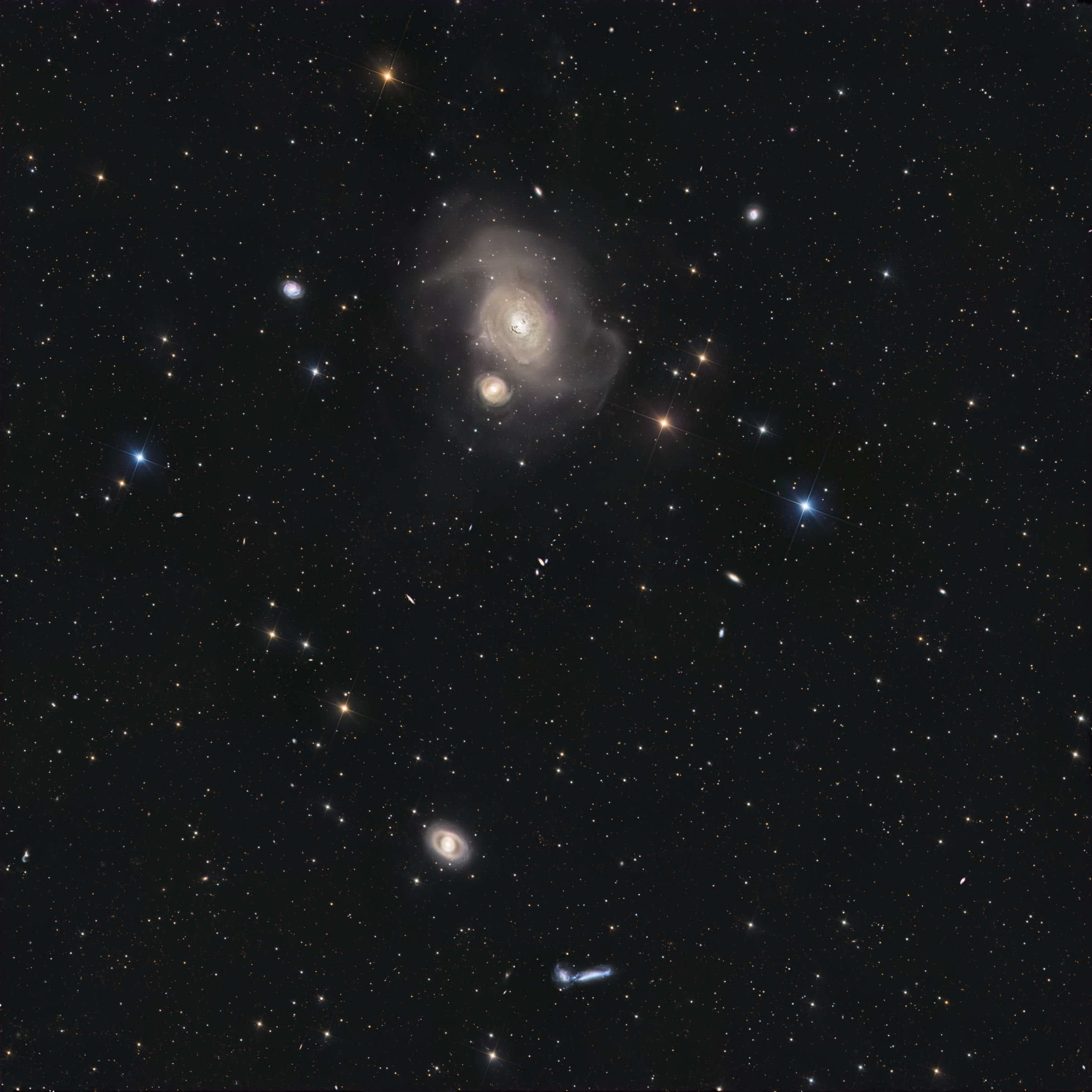
The Fornax galaxy cluster with NGC 1316 (large, near middle)

NGC 1316 is located within the Fornax Cluster, a cluster of galaxies in the constellation Fornax. However, in contrast to Messier 87, which is a similar elliptical galaxy that is located in the center of the Virgo Cluster, NGC 1316 is located at the edge of the Fornax Cluster.

NGC 1316 appears to be interacting with NGC 1317, a small spiral galaxy to the north. However, that small spiral galaxy does not appear to be sufficiently large enough to cause the distortions seen in the structure of this galaxy.

== Distance estimates ==
At least two methods have been used to estimate the distance to NGC 1316: surface brightness fluctuation (SBF) in 2003 and planetary nebula luminosity function (PNLF) in 2006. Being a lenticular galaxy, it is not suitable to apply the cepheid variable method; This is because Cepheids are typically massive, young stars, which lenticular galaxies lack the stellar resources to form. Using SBF, a distance estimate of 20.0 ± 1.6 Mpc was computed. Using PNLF, 45 planetary nebula candidates were located and a distance estimate of 17.9 ^{+0.8}_{−0.9} Mpc was computed. Averaged together, these two distance measurements give a combined distance estimate of 62.0 ± 2.9 Mly (19.0 ± 0.9 Mpc).^{[a]}

== Supernovae ==
NGC 1316 has hosted four supernovae:

- SN 1980N (Type Ia, mag. 14) was discovered by Marina Wischnjewsky on 30 November 1980. This is sometimes referred to as "Wischnjewsky's Supernova."
- SN 1981D (Type Ia, mag. 12.7) was discovered by Robert Evans on 10 March 1981.
- SN 2006dd (Type Ia, mag. 15) was discovered by Berto Monard on 19 June 2006. It got as bright as magnitude 12.1, making it the brightest supernova of 2006.
- SN 2006mr (Type Ia, mag. 15.6) was discovered by Berto Monard on 5 November 2006. For a brief period, both SN 2006dd and SN 2006mr were visible at the same time.

== See also ==
- Centaurus A
- Messier 87
- NGC 1097

== Notes ==
1. average(20.0 ± 1.6, 17.9 ^{+0.8}_{−0.9}) = ((20.0 + 17.9) / 2) ± ((1.6^{2} + 0.8^{2})^{0.5} / 2) = 19.0 ± 0.9
