= NGC 1428 =

Galaxy in the constellation Fornax

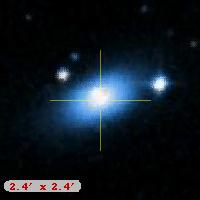
- DSS image of NGC 1428

Observation data (J2000 epoch)
- Constellation: Fornax
- Right ascension: 03^{h} 42^{m} 22.7^{s}
- Declination: −35° 09′ 14″
- Redshift: 0.005470
- Heliocentric radial velocity: 1640 km/s
- Distance: 65.61 Mly (20.117 Mpc)
- Group or cluster: Fornax Cluster
- Apparent magnitude (V): 13.90
- Absolute magnitude (V): -19.02

Characteristics
- Type: SAB0^- pec, E
- Mass: 5.3×10^{10} (Stellar mass)/9.5×10^{10} (Total Mass) M_{☉}
- Size: ~32,500 ly (9.97 kpc) (estimated)
- Apparent size (V): 1.6 x 0.8

Other designations
- ESO 358- G 053, MCG -06-09-022, FCC 277, PGC 013611

NGC 1428 is a peculiar galaxy of an uncertain morphology; either an elliptical or lenticular galaxy located approximately 65 million light-years away from Earth.

It was discovered by astronomer Julius Schmidt, at that time director of the National Observatory of Athens, on January 19, 1865. The discovery was made using a 6 ft refractor, and it was published ten years later. It is a member of the Fornax Cluster.

40 known globular clusters have been observed surrounding NGC 1428 along with 23 observed planetary nebulae.

== Physical characteristics ==
NGC 1428 is host to a nuclear star cluster with an estimated mass ranging from 1.4 × 10^{7} to 2.2 × 10^{7} M_{☉}. It is thought that this nuclear star cluster which surrounded by a nuclear stellar disk formed from multiple instances of gas acrecction and subsequent episodes of star formation. The presence of counter-rotating population of stars suggests the occurrence of mergers that occurred in the opposite direction of the rotation of NGC 1428.

The galaxy has a supermassive black hole with an estimated mass of 4.1 × 10^{7} M_{☉}.

== See also ==
- List of NGC objects (1001–2000)
