= NGC 1427A =

Galaxy in the constellation Eridanus

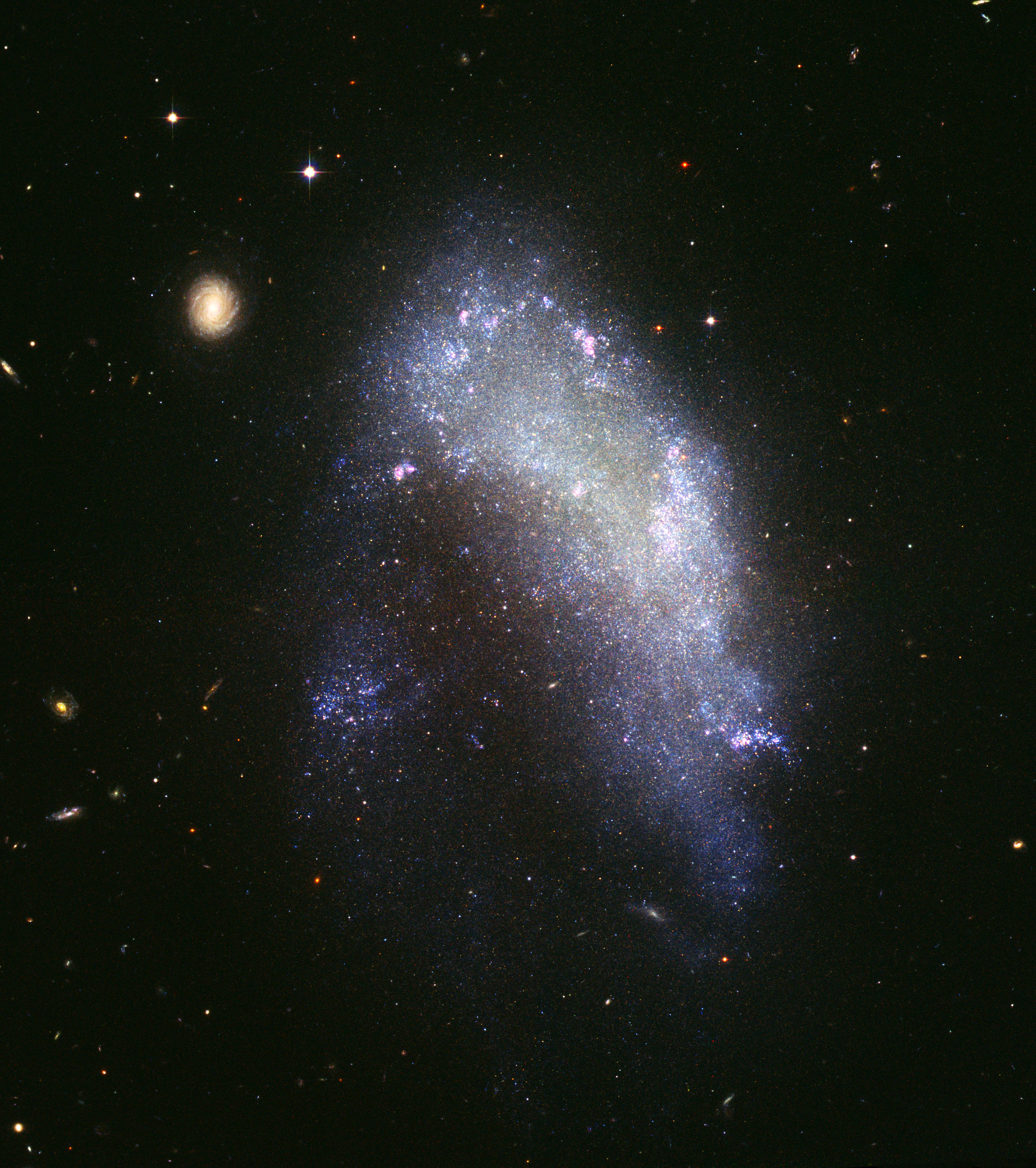
- Hubble Space Telescope image of NGC 1427A

Observation data (J2000 epoch)
- Constellation: Eridanus
- Right ascension: 3^{h} 40^{m} 9.3^{s}
- Declination: −35° 37′ 28″
- Redshift: 0.006764
- Heliocentric radial velocity: 2028 ± 1 km/s
- Distance: 51.9^{+5.3}_{−4.7} Mly (15.9^{+1.6}_{−1.4} Mpc)
- Apparent magnitude (V): 13.4
- Absolute magnitude (V): -18.62 ± 0.64

Characteristics
- Type: IB(s)m
- Size: ~75,700 ly (23.21 kpc) (estimated)
- Apparent size (V): 2.3′ × 1.5′

Other designations
- ESO 358- G 049, MCG -06-09-016, FCC 235, PGC 13500

NGC 1427A, also known as ESO 358-49, or ESO 358-G049, is an irregular galaxy in the constellation Eridanus. Its distance modulus has been estimated using the globular cluster luminosity function to be 31.01 ± 0.21 which is about 52 Mly. It is the brightest dwarf irregular member of the Fornax Cluster and is in the foreground of the cluster's central galaxy NGC 1399.

== Characteristics and fate ==
NGC 1427A is over 20,000 light-years long and similar to the Large Magellanic Cloud. The resulting pressure is giving the galaxy its arrowhead outline and triggering the episodes of star formation.

Under the influence of galactic tides, NGC 1427A is travelling into the center of the Fornax Cluster with a velocity of approximately 600 km per second. Its distinctive arrowhead shape has been formed by this rapid, upwards movement. The interaction of NGC 1427A with Fornax gasses and galaxies during its journey will cause the disruption of the galaxy within the next billion years, an event which was common during the evolution of the Universe but has become increasingly rare.

== Observations ==
The Hubble Space Telescope's Used Advanced Camera's for Surveys that were used to obtain images of NGC 1427A in visible (green), red, and infrared filters in January 2003. These images were then combined by the Hubble Heritage team to create the color image shown in box. Astronomers are using the data to investigate the star-formation patterns throughout the object, to verify a prediction that there should be a relation between the ages of stars and their positions within the galaxy. This will help them understand how the gravitational influence of the cluster has affected the internal workings of this galaxy, and how this galaxy has responded to passing through the cluster environment. This image was image of the day on March 4, 2005.

=== Background spiral galaxy ===
To the upper left of NGC 1427A is a background galaxy that happens to lie near Hubble's line of sight but is some 25 times further away, about 1.3 billion light-years away. In contrast to the irregularly shaped NGC 1427A, the background galaxy is a magnificent spiral, somewhat similar to our own Milky Way. Stars are forming in its symmetric pinwheel-shaped spiral arms, which can be traced into the galaxy's bright nucleus. This galaxy is, however, less dominated by very young stars than NGC 1427A, giving it an overall yellower color. At even greater distances background galaxies of various shapes and colors are scattered across the Hubble image.
