= NGC 1399 =

Galaxy in the constellation Fornax

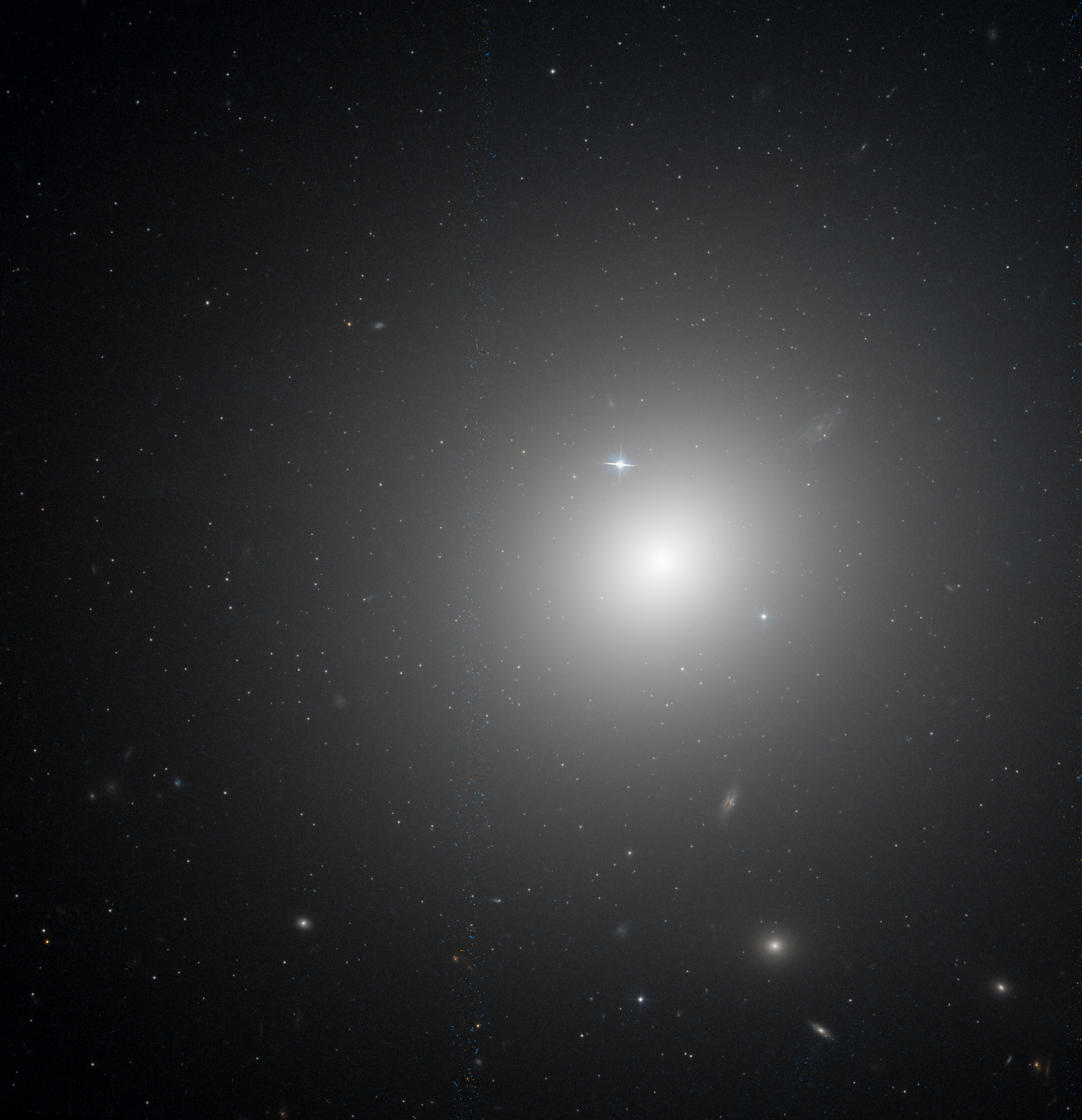
- Hubble Space Telescope image of NGC 1399

Observation data (J2000 epoch)
- Constellation: Fornax
- Right ascension: 03^{h} 38.5^{m}
- Declination: −35° 27′
- Distance: 20.23 Mpc (66 Mly)
- Apparent magnitude (V): 9.9

Characteristics
- Type: E1p
- Size: ~365,000 ly (111.90 kpc) (estimated)
- Apparent size (V): 3.2′ × 3.1′
- Notable features: Central galaxy of the Fornax cluster

Other designations
- 6dFGS gJ033829.0-352702, 2E 816, 2E 0336.5-3536, ESO 358-45, ESO-LV 358-0450, FCC 213, 1H 0335-357, H 0333-35, LEDA 13418, 2MASX J03382908-3527026, MCG-06-09-012, MSH 03-3-03, OHIO E -361, PKS 0336-35, PKS 0336-355 PKS J0338-3523, RBS 454, 1RXS J033828.8-352701, SGC 033634-3536.7, [CAC2009] S0373 b, [CHM2007] HDC 234 J033829.08-3527026, [CHM2007] LDC 249 J033829.08-3527026, [DLB87] F5, [FWB89] Galaxy 100

NGC 1399 is a large elliptical galaxy in the southern constellation Fornax, the central galaxy in the Fornax Cluster. The galaxy is 66 million light-years away from Earth. With a diameter of approximately 365,000 light-years, it is one of the largest galaxies in the Fornax Cluster and considerably larger than the Milky Way. William Herschel discovered this galaxy on October 22, 1835.

== Characteristics ==
It is a type-cD galaxy, with a bright center and a vast, diffuse envelope surrounding it. It is also an early-type galaxy, the largest one in the Fornax Cluster.

Despite their name, early-type galaxies are much older than spiral galaxies, and mostly comprise old, red-colored stars. Very little star formation occurs in these galaxies; the lack of star formation in elliptical galaxies appears to start at the center and then slowly propagates outward.

=== Globular clusters ===
NGC 1399 is very rich in globular clusters. The population is estimated to be between 5700 and 6500. It has been proposed that NGC 1399 has a rich system of globular clusters because NGC 1404 gave up most of its globular clusters due to gravitational interactions. The estimated angular extent, measured from the NGC 1399 centre and up to a limiting radius where the areal density of blue globular clusters falls to 30 per cent of the background level, is 45±5 arcmin, which corresponds to 220–275 kpc at the Fornax distance. The bimodal colour distribution of this globular cluster system, as well as the different radial distribution of blue and red clusters, up to these large distances from the parent galaxy, are confirmed. The azimuthal globular cluster distribution exhibits asymmetries that might be understood in terms of tidal stripping of globulars from NGC 1387, another nearby galaxy. The good agreement between the areal density profile of blue clusters and a projected dark-matter NFW density profile is emphasized.

=== Supermassive black hole ===
The core of NGC 1399 contains a supermassive black hole of 510 million solar masses, a factor of over 2 below the correlation of black hole mass and velocity dispersion. There is also a dramatic signature for central tangential anisotropy. The velocity profiles on adjacent sides 0.5" away from the nucleus show strong bimodality, and the central spectrum shows a large drop in the dispersion. Both of these observations point to an orbital distribution that is tangentially biased. The best-fit orbital model suggests a ratio of the tangential to radial internal velocity dispersions of 3. This ratio is the largest seen in any galaxy to date and will provide an important measure for the mode by which the central black hole has grown.

=== Planetary nebulae ===
There are 37 planetary nebulae in this galaxy. Their magnitudes are around 27. The accuracy of the measured radial velocities of these planetary nebulae is about 70 km/s, which is much smaller than the velocity dispersion of the galaxy.

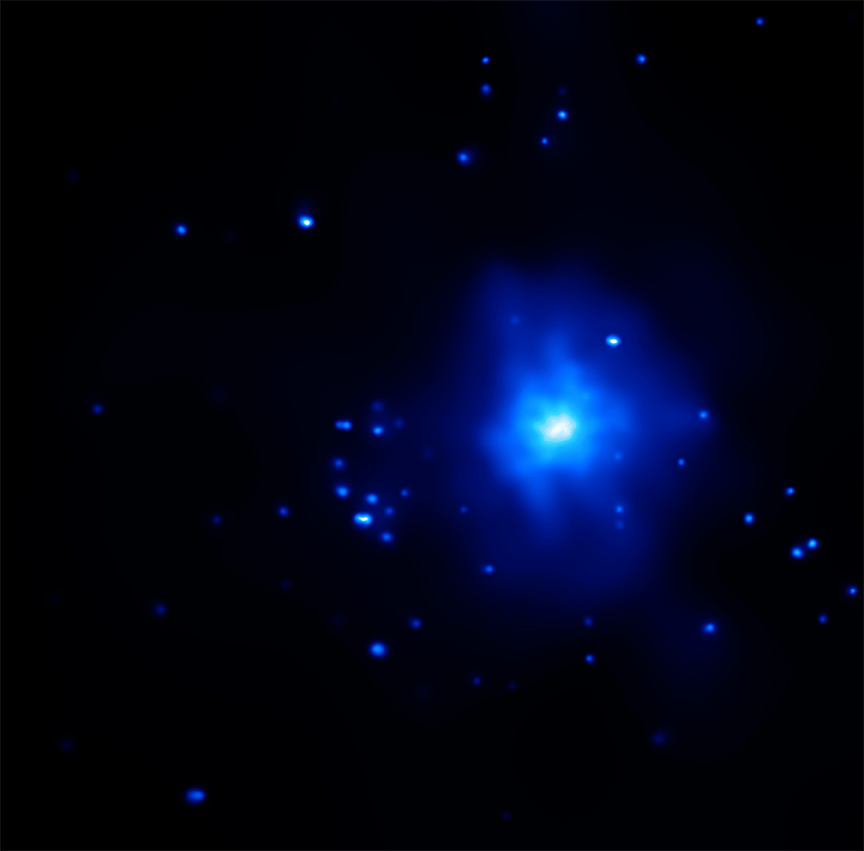
NGC 1399 X-ray image of Chandra

== Spectrum ==
A spectrum was taken as part of a study of giant elliptical galaxies to figure out why galaxies of this type do not form stars. The data collected with Herschel showed that, contrary to previous belief, most of these galaxies contain plenty of cold gas – the raw material to form stars – with the exception of NGC 1399 and one other.

A multi-wavelength study suggested that, while hot gas cools down in these galaxies, stars do not form because of feedback from the central supermassive black hole, which heats up the gas again or pushes it beyond the galaxy's reach. For most of the galaxies observed, the activity of the black hole seems to have put an end to star formation but has not yet succeeded in clearing them of all their cold gas, but in the case of NGC 1399 the feedback cycle appears to be at a more advanced stage, as the jets have hardly left any trace of cold gas.

== Ultraluminous X-ray source ==
In 2010, Chandra X-ray Observatory found an ultraluminous X-ray source (ULX). The ULX's position is in one of NGC 1399's globular clusters, a very old and crowded environment. Evidence from Chandra suggests that a white dwarf star has been torn apart by an intermediate-mass black hole, but this is only a proposal, and its true nature remains a mystery. If confirmed, it would be first black hole found in this setting. A 2019 study of globular cluster ULXs in NGC 1399 has since disproven this proposal, as the source has remained X-ray bright far longer than is theoretically possible in the intermediate-mass black hole disrupting a white dwarf scenario.

== Environment ==
VST image of the Fornax Galaxy Cluster

NGC 1399 is the central galaxy of the Fornax Cluster, the second richest cluster within 100 megaparsecs. It is also the central galaxy of the main subgroup. Near NGC 1399 are NGC 1396, NGC 1404 and NGC 1387. There are ultracompact dwarf galaxies surrounding the galaxy, while NGC 1427A, an irregular galaxy, lies near its center.

Ultracompact dwarf galaxies were first discovered in the Fornax Cluster in 2003. Almost all of them surround NGC 1399, as it is the central galaxy of the cluster.
