= NGC 7583 =

Galaxy in the constellation of Pisces

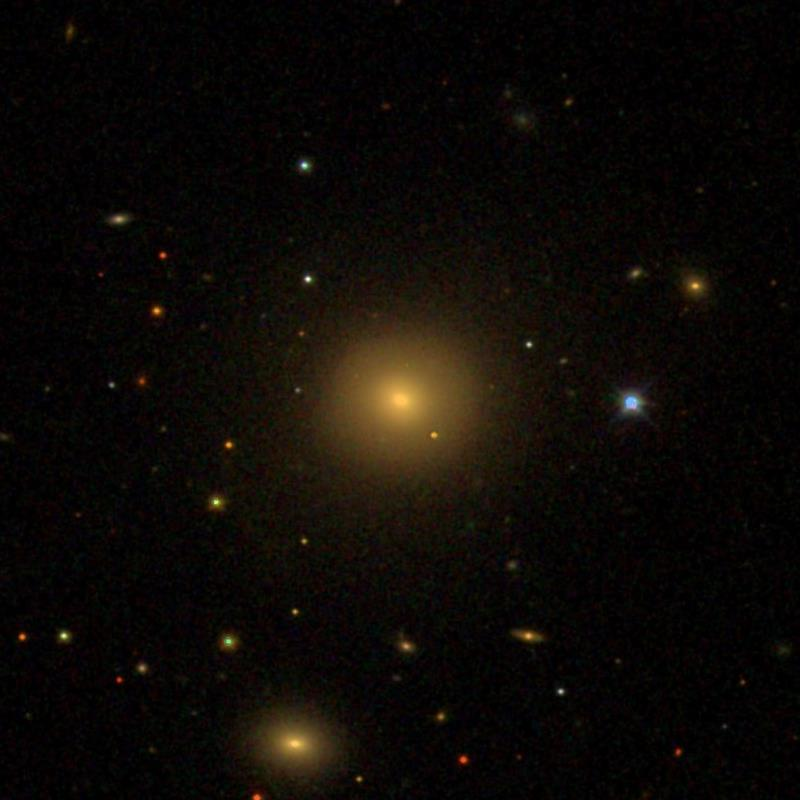
- SDSS image of NGC 7583

Observation data (J2000 epoch)
- Constellation: Pisces
- Right ascension: 23^{h} 17^{m} 52.778^{s}
- Declination: +07° 22′ 45.84″
- Redshift: 0.042062
- Heliocentric radial velocity: 12345 km/s
- Distance: 571.8 ± 40.1 Mly (175.32 ± 12.28 Mpc)
- Apparent magnitude (V): 14.45
- Apparent magnitude (B): 15.20

Characteristics
- Type: S0-a

Other designations
- MCG +01-59-034, PGC 70975

NGC 7583 is a lenticular galaxy located in the constellation Pisces. It was discovered on September 2, 1864 by the astronomer Albert Marth.

== See also ==
- Spindle galaxy – Class of galaxy that is cigar shaped and rotates around its long axis
- List of largest galaxies
- List of nearest galaxies
