= NGC 525 =

Galaxy in the constellation Pisces

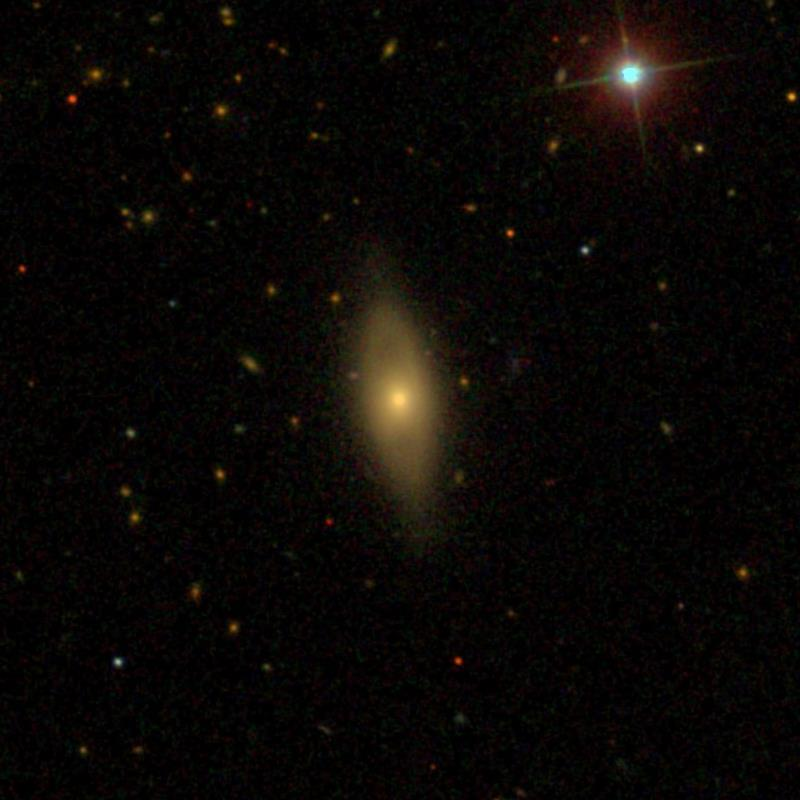
- NGC 525 as seen on SDSS

Observation data (J2000 epoch)
- Constellation: Pisces
- Right ascension: 01^{h} 24^{m} 52.9^{s}
- Declination: +09° 42′ 12″
- Redshift: 0.007158 ± 0.000167
- Heliocentric radial velocity: (2138 ± 50) km/s
- Distance: 95.6 Mly
- Apparent magnitude (V): 13.3
- Apparent magnitude (B): 14.3

Characteristics
- Type: S0
- Apparent size (V): 1.5' × 0.7'

Other designations
- PGC 5232, UGC 972, MGC +01-04-054, 2MASS J01245290+09421164

NGC 525, also occasionally referred to as PGC 5232 or UGC 972, is a lenticular galaxy located approximately 95.6 million light-years from the Solar System in the constellation Pisces. It was discovered on 25 September 1862 by astronomer Heinrich d'Arrest. The galaxy has a faint outer ring structure, which gives it the "Lenticular" type name.

== Observation history ==
D'Arrest discovered NGC 525 using his 11-inch refractor telescope at Copenhagen. He located the galaxy's position with a total of two observations. As he also noted the mag 11-12 star just 2' northwest, his position is fairly accurate. The galaxy was later catalogued by John Louis Emil Dreyer in the New General Catalogue, where it was described as "very faint, very small, 11th or 12th magnitude star 5 seconds of time to west".

== Description ==
The galaxy appears very dim in the sky as it only has an apparent visual magnitude of 13.3 and thus can only be observed with telescopes. It can be classified as type S0 using the Hubble Sequence. The object's distance of roughly 95.6 million light-years from the Solar System can be estimated using its redshift and Hubble's law.

== See also ==
- List of NGC objects (1–1000)
