= NGC 4825 =

Galaxy in the constellation Virgo

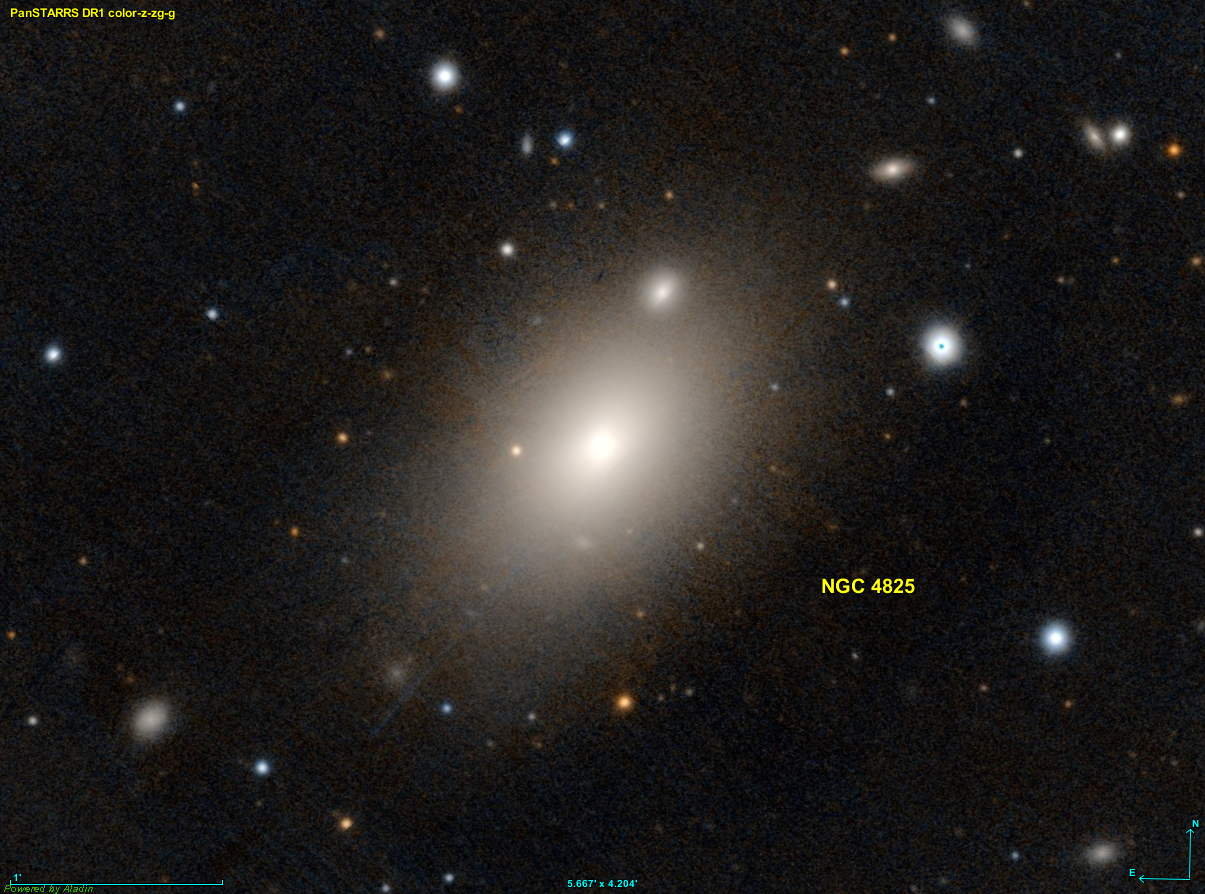
- A PanSTARRS Image of NGC 4825

Observation data (J2000 epoch)
- Constellation: Virgo
- Right ascension: 12^{h} 57^{m} 12.20^{s}
- Declination: −13° 39′ 56.00″
- Redshift: 0.01475±0.00022
- Distance: 230 Mly (70.55 Mpc)
- Apparent magnitude (V): 11.9

Characteristics
- Type: SA0^-
- Size: 133,000 ly
- Apparent size (V): 2.63′ × 1.585′
- Notable features: Turning into spiral(?)

Other designations
- PGC 44261, LEDA 44261, MCG -02-33-070, GSC 05542-01145

NGC 4825 is a lenticular galaxy located around 230 million light-years away in the constellation Virgo. NGC 4825 was discovered on March 27, 1786 by the astronomer William Herschel, and its diameter is 133,000 light-years across. NGC 4825 is not known to have much star-formation, and it does not have an active galactic nucleus.

== Nearby and satellite galaxies ==
NGC 4825 does have one suspected satellite galaxy, J12571108-1339100, a dwarf elliptical galaxy.

Some nearby galaxies are NGC 4823, NGC 4829, and NGC 4820.
