= LEDA 83677 =

Seyfert lenticular galaxy in the constellation Coma Berenices

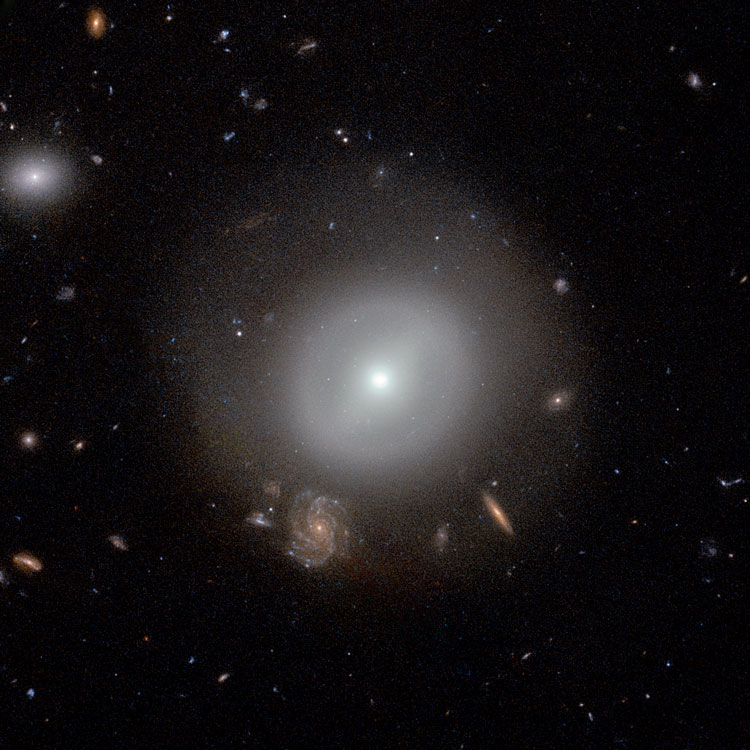
- A Hubble Image of the Seyfert Galaxy LEDA 83677

Observation data (J2000 epoch)
- Constellation: Coma Berenices
- Right ascension: 12^{h} 57^{m} 10.7^{s}
- Declination: 27° 24′ 18″
- Redshift: 0.020731/6215 km/s
- Distance: 288,510,000 ly
- Apparent magnitude (V): 15.7

Characteristics
- Type: Sa
- Size: ~53,890 ly (estimated)
- Apparent size (V): 0.53 x 0.43

Other designations
- 2MASX J12571076+2724177, PGC 83677

LEDA 83677 is a lenticular galaxy located about 290 million light-years away in the constellation Coma Berenices. It is a member of the Coma cluster of galaxies. LEDA 83677 is also classified as a type 1 Seyfert galaxy. The core of the galaxy is emitting high-energy X-rays and ultraviolet light, probably caused by a massive black hole lurking in the core.

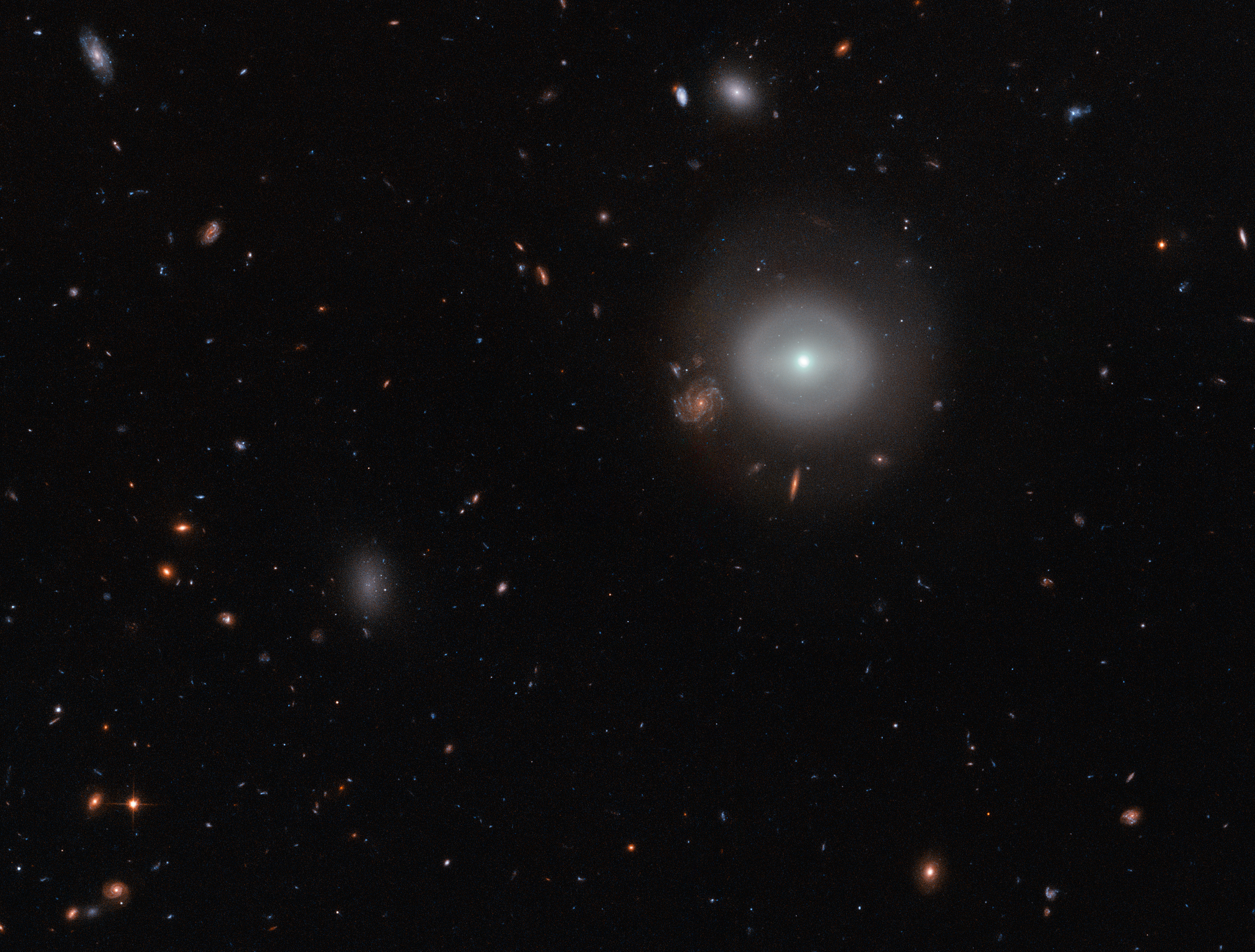
Wider image of LEDA 83677 with more distant galaxies in the background

== See also ==
- NGC 4477
- NGC 6814
