= Hubble sequence =

Galaxy morphological classification scheme advocated by Edwin Hubble

The Hubble sequence is a morphological classification scheme for galaxies published by Edwin Hubble in 1926. It is often colloquially known as the Hubble tuning-fork diagram because the shape in which it is traditionally represented resembles a tuning fork. It was invented by John Henry Reynolds and Sir James Jeans.

Tuning-fork style diagram of the Hubble sequence

The tuning fork scheme divided regular galaxies into three broad classes – ellipticals, lenticulars and spirals – based on their visual appearance (originally on photographic plates). A fourth class contains galaxies with an irregular appearance. The Hubble sequence is the most commonly used system for classifying galaxies, both in professional astronomical research and in amateur astronomy.

== Classes of galaxies ==
=== Ellipticals ===
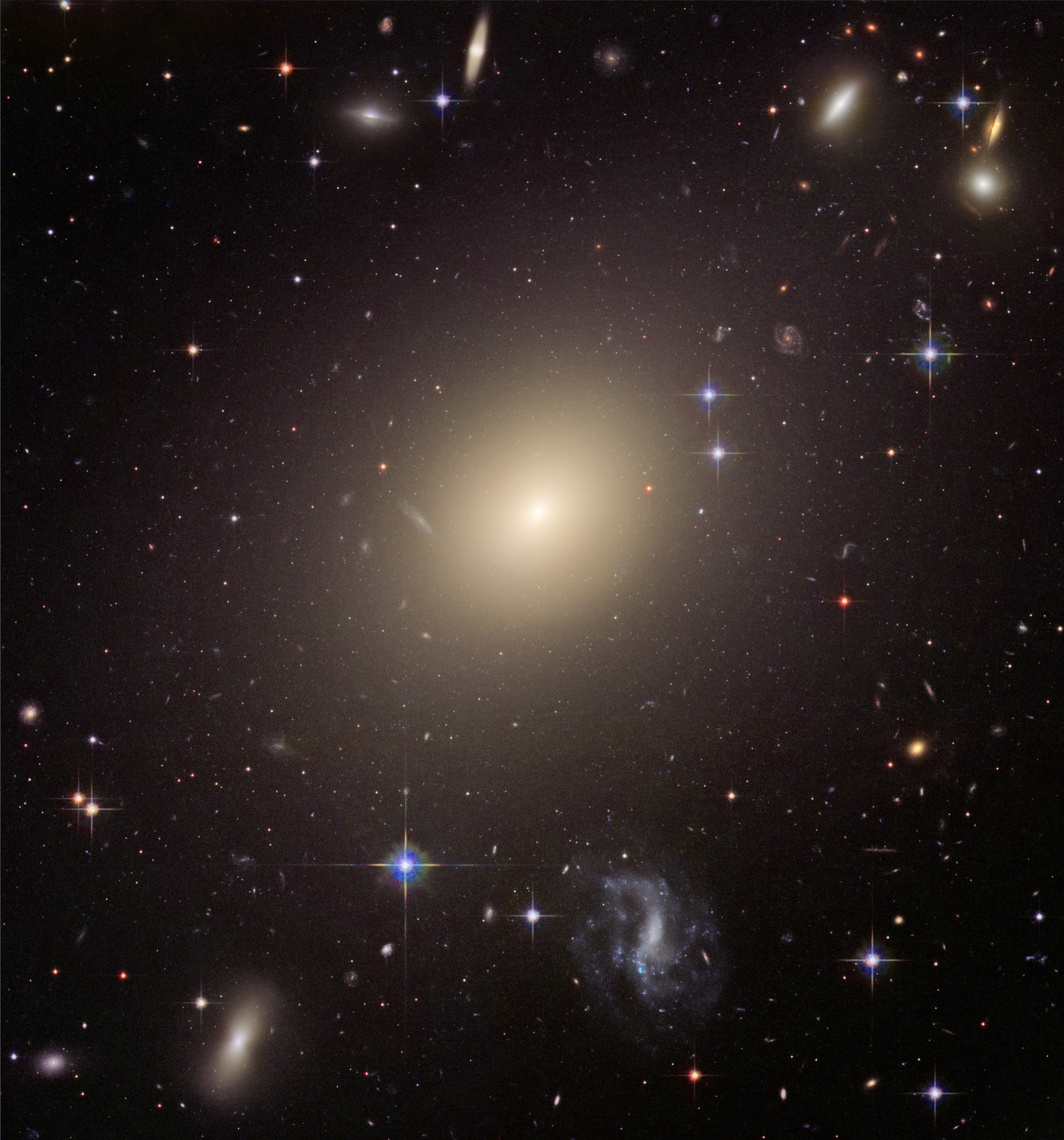
The giant elliptical galaxy ESO 325-G004.

On the left (in the sense that the sequence is usually drawn) lie the ellipticals. Elliptical galaxies have relatively smooth, featureless light distributions and appear as ellipses in photographic images. They are denoted by the letter E, followed by an integer n representing their degree of ellipticity in the sky. By convention, n is ten times the ellipticity of the galaxy, rounded to the nearest integer, where the ellipticity is defined as e = 1 − b/ a for an ellipse with a the semi-major axis length and b the semi-minor axis length. The ellipticity increases from left to right on the Hubble diagram, with near-circular (E0) galaxies situated on the very left of the diagram. The ellipticity of a galaxy on the sky is only indirectly related to the true 3-dimensional shape (for example, a flattened, discus-shaped galaxy can appear almost round if viewed face-on or highly elliptical if viewed edge-on). Observationally, the most flattened "elliptical" galaxies have ellipticities e = 0.7 (denoted E7). However, from studying the light profiles and the ellipticity profiles, rather than just looking at the images, it was realised in the 1960s that the E5–E7 galaxies are probably misclassified lenticular galaxies with large-scale disks seen at various inclinations to our line-of-sight. Observations of the kinematics of early-type galaxies further confirmed this.

Examples of elliptical galaxies: M49, M59, M60, M87, NGC 4125.

=== Lenticulars ===
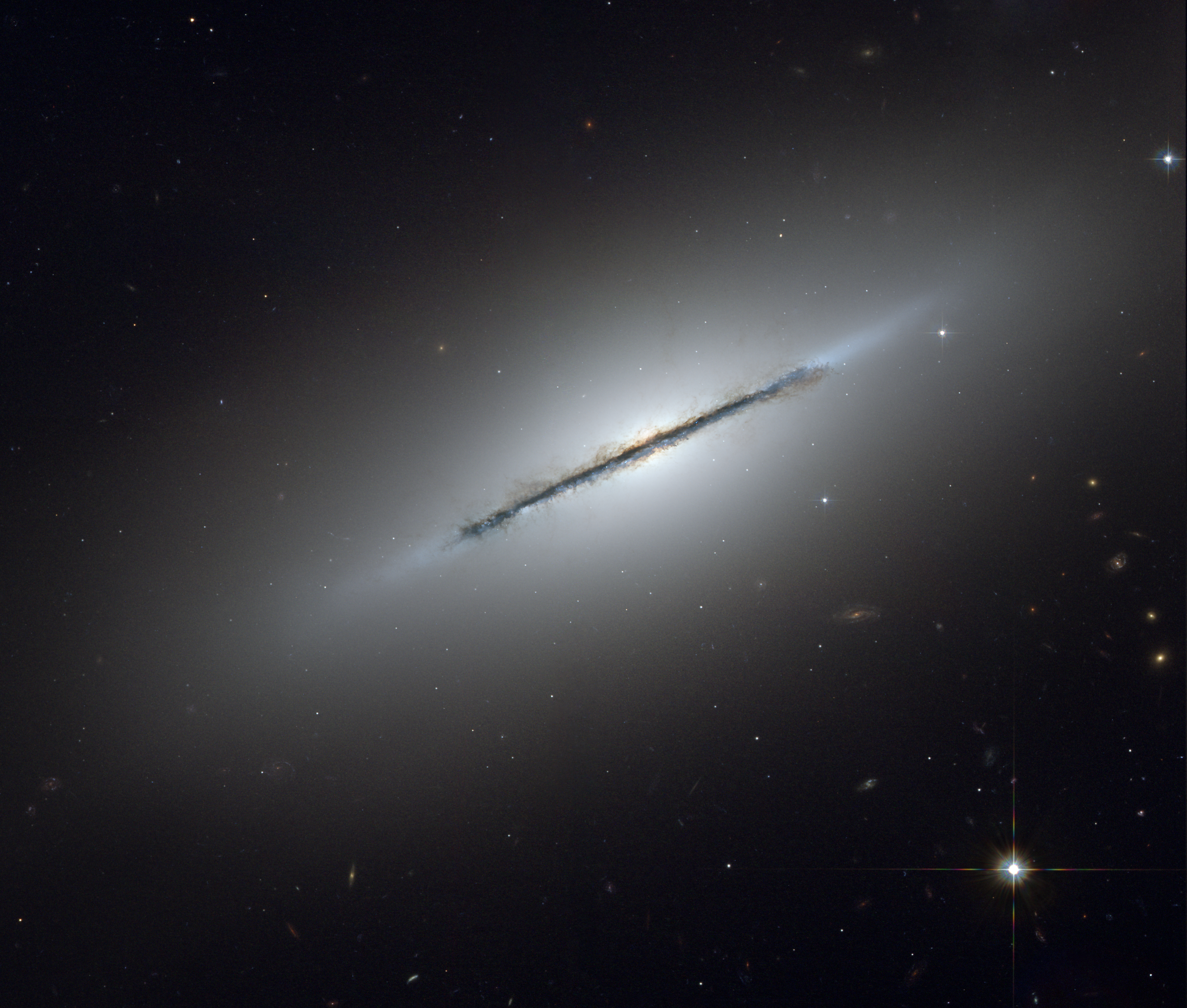
The Spindle Galaxy (NGC 5866), a lenticular galaxy with a prominent dust lane in the constellation of Draco.

At the centre of the Hubble tuning fork, where the two spiral-galaxy branches and the elliptical branch join, lies an intermediate class of galaxies known as lenticulars and given the symbol S0. These galaxies consist of a bright central bulge, similar in appearance to an elliptical galaxy, surrounded by an extended, disk-like structure. Unlike spiral galaxies, the disks of lenticular galaxies have no visible spiral structure and are not actively forming stars in any significant quantity.

When simply looking at a galaxy's image, lenticular galaxies with relatively face-on disks are difficult to distinguish from ellipticals of type E0–E3, making the classification of many such galaxies uncertain. When viewed edge-on, the disk becomes more apparent and prominent dust-lanes are sometimes visible in absorption at optical wavelengths.

At the time of the initial publication of Hubble's galaxy classification scheme, the existence of lenticular galaxies was purely hypothetical. Hubble believed that they were necessary as an intermediate stage between the highly flattened "ellipticals" and spirals. Later observations (by Hubble himself, among others) showed Hubble's belief to be correct and the S0 class was included in the definitive exposition of the Hubble sequence by Allan Sandage. Missing from the Hubble sequence are the early-type galaxies with intermediate-scale disks, in between the E0 and S0 types, Martha Liller denoted them ES galaxies in 1966.

Lenticular and spiral galaxies, taken together, are often referred to as disk galaxies. The bulge-to-disk flux ratio in lenticular galaxies can take on a range of values, just as it does for each of the spiral galaxy morphological types (Sa, Sb, etc.).

Examples of lenticular galaxies: M85, M86, NGC 1316, NGC 2787, NGC 5866, Centaurus A.

=== Spirals ===
The Pinwheel Galaxy (Messier 101/NGC 5457): a spiral galaxy classified as type Scd on the Hubble sequence

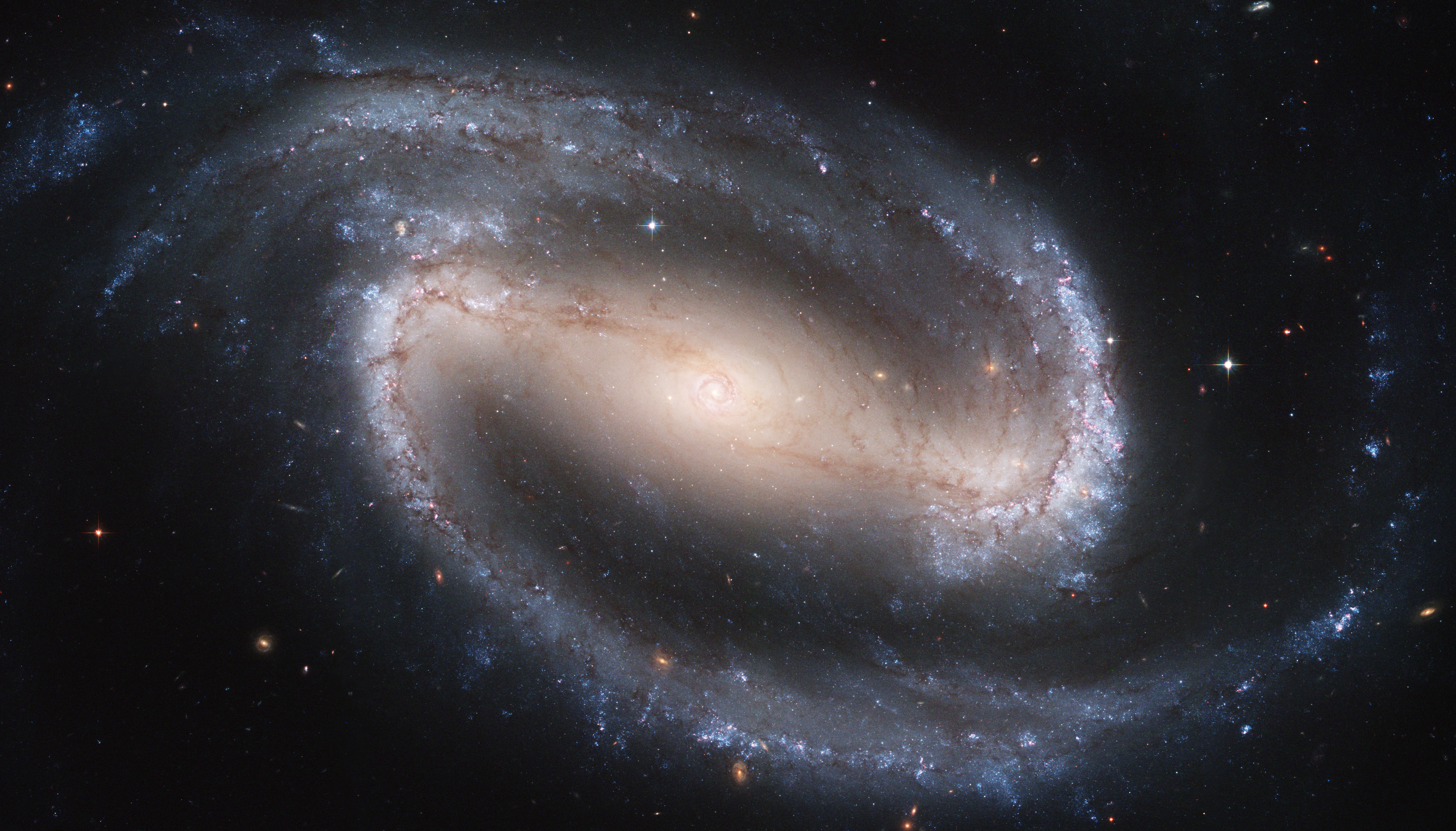
The barred spiral galaxy NGC 1300: a type SBbc

On the right of the Hubble sequence diagram are two parallel branches encompassing the spiral galaxies. A spiral galaxy consists of a flattened disk, with stars forming a (usually two-armed) spiral structure, and a central concentration of stars known as the bulge. Roughly half of all spirals are also observed to have a bar-like structure, with the bar extending from the central bulge, and the arms begin at the ends of the bar. In the tuning-fork diagram, the regular spirals occupy the upper branch and are denoted by the letter S, while the lower branch contains the barred spirals, given the symbol SB. Both type of spirals are further subdivided according to the detailed appearance of their spiral structures. Membership of one of these subdivisions is indicated by adding a lower-case letter to the morphological type, as follows:

- Sa (SBa) – tightly wound, smooth arms; large, bright central bulge
- Sb (SBb) – less tightly wound spiral arms than Sa (SBa); somewhat fainter bulge
- Sc (SBc) – loosely wound spiral arms, clearly resolved into individual stellar clusters and nebulae; smaller, fainter bulge

Hubble originally described three classes of spiral galaxy. This was extended by Gérard de Vaucouleurs to include a fourth class:

- Sd (SBd) – very loosely wound, fragmentary arms; most of the luminosity is in the arms and not the bulge

Although strictly part of the de Vaucouleurs system of classification, the Sd class is often included in the Hubble sequence. The basic spiral types can be extended to enable finer distinctions of appearance. For example, spiral galaxies whose appearance is intermediate between two of the above classes are often identified by appending two lower-case letters to the main galaxy type (for example, Sbc for a galaxy that is intermediate between an Sb and an Sc).

Our own Milky Way is generally classed as Sc or SBc, making it a barred spiral with well-defined arms.

Examples of regular spiral galaxies: (visually) M31 (Andromeda Galaxy), M74, M81, M104 (Sombrero Galaxy), M51a (Whirlpool Galaxy), NGC 300, NGC 772.

Examples of barred spiral galaxies: M91, M95, NGC 1097, NGC 1300, NGC1672, NGC 2536, NGC 2903.

=== Irregulars ===
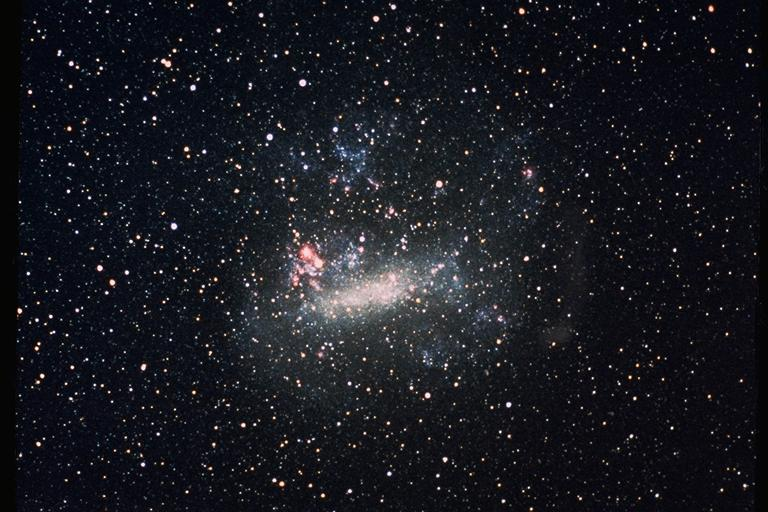
The Large Magellanic Cloud (LMC) – a dwarf irregular galaxy

Galaxies that do not fit into the Hubble sequence, because they have no regular structure (either disk-like or ellipsoidal), are termed irregular galaxies. Hubble defined two classes of irregular galaxy:

- Irr I galaxies have asymmetric profiles and lack a central bulge or obvious spiral structure; instead they contain many individual clusters of young stars
- Irr II galaxies have smoother, asymmetric appearances and are not clearly resolved into individual stars or stellar clusters

In his extension to the Hubble sequence, de Vaucouleurs called the Irr I galaxies 'Magellanic irregulars', after the Magellanic Clouds – two satellites of the Milky Way which Hubble classified as Irr I. The discovery of a faint spiral structure in the Large Magellanic Cloud led de Vaucouleurs to further divide the irregular galaxies into those that, like the LMC, show some evidence for spiral structure (these are given the symbol Sm) and those that have no obvious structure, such as the Small Magellanic Cloud (denoted Im). In the extended Hubble sequence, the Magellanic irregulars are usually placed at the end of the spiral branch of the Hubble tuning fork.

Examples of irregular galaxies: M82, NGC 1427A, Large Magellanic Cloud, Small Magellanic Cloud.

== Physical significance ==
Elliptical and lenticular galaxies are commonly referred to together as "early-type" galaxies, while spirals and irregular galaxies are referred to as "late types". This nomenclature is the source of the common, but erroneous, belief that the Hubble sequence was intended to reflect a supposed evolutionary sequence, from elliptical galaxies through lenticulars to either barred or regular spirals. In fact, Hubble was clear from the beginning that no such interpretation was implied:

The nomenclature, it is emphasized, refers to position in the sequence, and temporal connotations are made at one's peril. The entire classification is purely empirical and without prejudice to theories of evolution...

The evolutionary picture appears to be lent weight by the fact that the disks of spiral galaxies are observed to be home to many young stars and regions of active star formation, while elliptical galaxies are composed of predominantly old stellar populations. In fact, current evidence suggests the opposite: the early Universe appears to be dominated by spiral and irregular galaxies. In the currently favored picture of galaxy formation, present-day ellipticals formed as a result of mergers between these earlier building blocks; while some lenticular galaxies may have formed this way, others may have accreted their disks around pre-existing spheroids. Some lenticular galaxies may also be evolved spiral galaxies, whose gas has been stripped away leaving no fuel for continued star formation, although the galaxy LEDA 2108986 opens the debate on this.

== Shortcomings ==
A common criticism of the Hubble scheme is that the criteria for assigning galaxies to classes are subjective, leading to different observers assigning galaxies to different classes (although experienced observers usually agree to within less than a single Hubble type). Although not really a shortcoming, since the 1961 Hubble Atlas of Galaxies, the primary criteria used to assign the morphological type (a, b, c, etc.) has been the nature of the spiral arms, rather than the bulge-to-disk flux ratio, and thus a range of flux ratios exist for each morphological type, as with the lenticular galaxies.

Another criticism of the Hubble classification scheme is that, being based on the appearance of a galaxy in a two-dimensional image, the classes are only indirectly related to the true physical properties of galaxies. In particular, problems arise because of orientation effects. The same galaxy would look very different, if viewed edge-on, as opposed to a face-on or 'broadside' viewpoint. As such, the early-type sequence is poorly represented: The ES galaxies are missing from the Hubble sequence, and the E5–E7 galaxies are actually S0 galaxies. Furthermore, the barred ES and barred S0 galaxies are also absent. Visual classifications are also less reliable for faint or distant galaxies, and the appearance of galaxies can change depending on the wavelength of light in which they are observed.

Nonetheless, the Hubble sequence is still commonly used in the field of extragalactic astronomy and Hubble types are known to correlate with many physically relevant properties of galaxies, such as luminosities, colours, masses (of stars and gas) and star formation rates.

In June 2019, citizen scientists in the Galaxy Zoo project argued that the usual Hubble classification, particularly concerning spiral galaxies, may not be supported by evidence. Consequently, the scheme may need revision.

== See also ==
- Galaxy color–magnitude diagram
- Galaxy morphological classification
