= NGC 1460 =

Galaxy in the constellation Eridanus

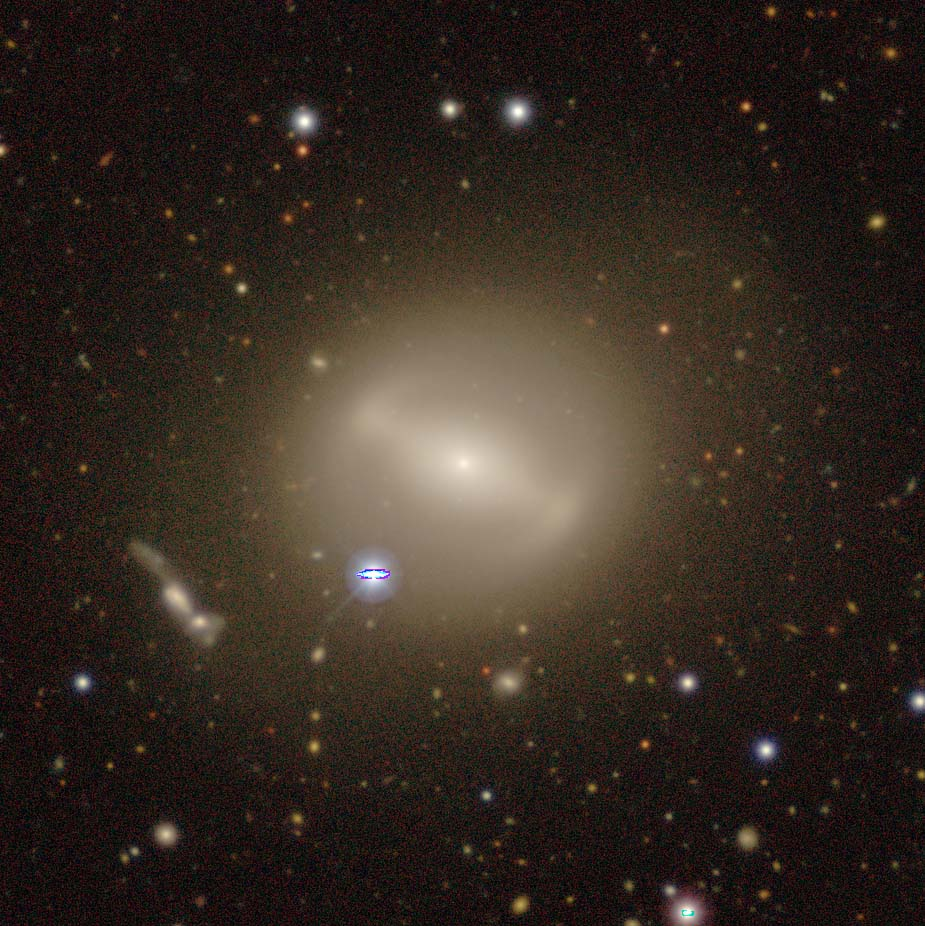
- legacy surveys image of NGC 1460

Observation data (J2000.0 epoch)
- Constellation: Eridanus
- Right ascension: 03^{h} 46^{m} 13.7^{s}
- Declination: −36° 41′ 47″
- Redshift: 0.004580
- Heliocentric radial velocity: 1373 km/s
- Distance: 65 Mly (19.9 Mpc)
- Apparent magnitude (V): 13.50
- Absolute magnitude (B): -19.48 ± 0.28

Characteristics
- Type: SB(rs)0^0
- Mass: 5.4×10^{9} (Stellar mass)/1×10^{10} (Total Mass) M_{☉}
- Size: ~43,500 ly (13.33 kpc) (estimated)
- Apparent size (V): 1.7 x 1.4

Other designations
- ESO 358- G 062, MCG -06-09-031, FCC 310, PGC 013805

NGC 1460 is a barred lenticular galaxy with a peanut-shaped bar approximately 65 million light-years away from Earth in the constellation of Eridanus. It was discovered by astronomer John Herschel on November 28, 1837. It is a member of the Fornax cluster.

NGC 1460 is host to a nuclear star cluster with an estimated mass of around 6.7 × 10^{7} M_{☉}, and is also host to a supermassive black hole with an estimated mass of around 6 × 10^{6} M_{☉}. It is also home to a population of around 39 observed globular clusters. There is also a population of 89 planetary nebulae, with 39 of them being observed in the center of the galaxy and 50 of them being observed in the halo of the galaxy.

== See also ==
- NGC 4598 - similar looking galaxy
- List of NGC objects (1001–2000)
