= NGC 1222 =

Lenticular galaxy in the constellation Eridanus

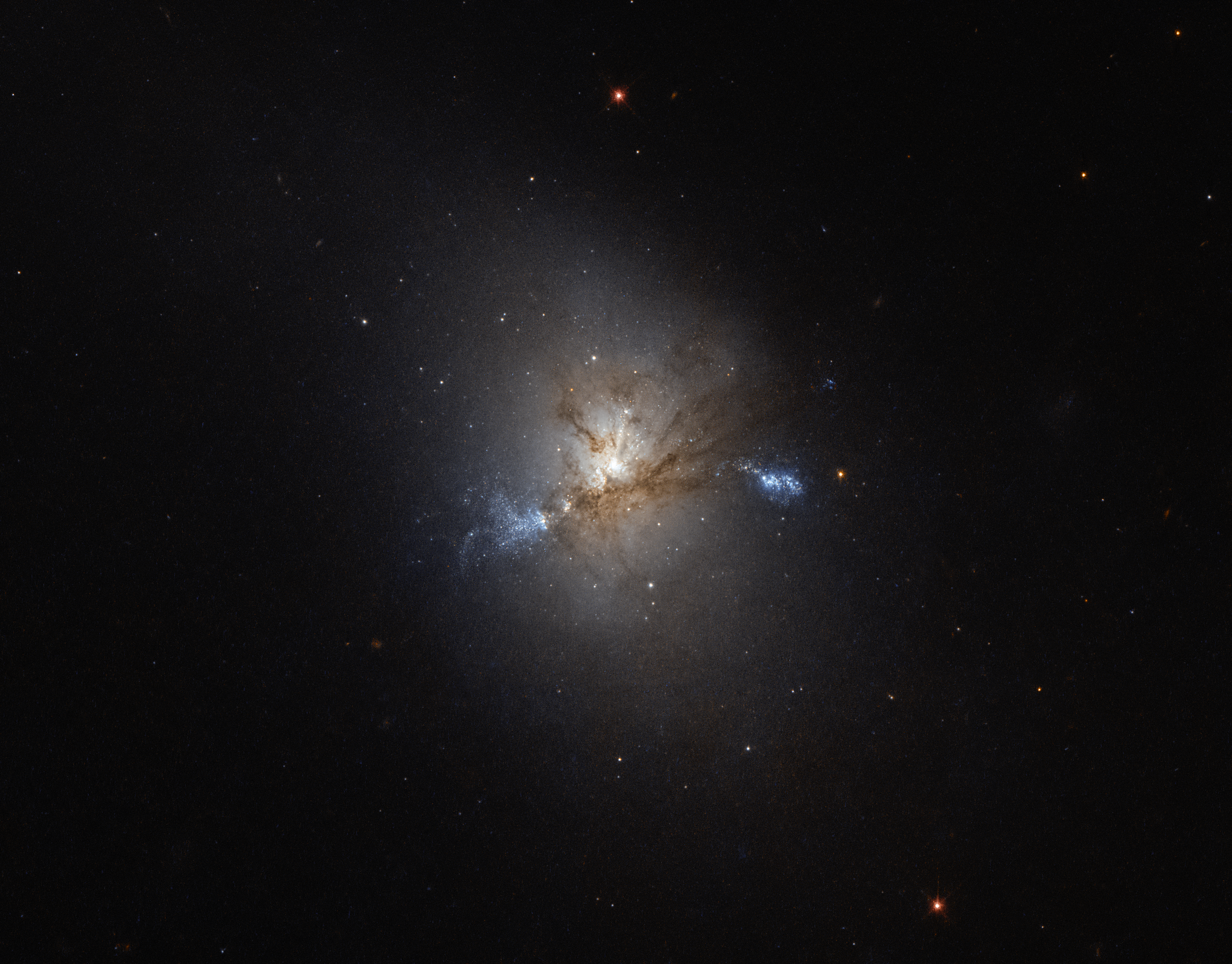
- NGC 1222 imaged by the Hubble Space Telescope

Observation data (J2000 epoch)
- Constellation: Eridanus
- Right ascension: 03^{h} 08^{m} 56.747^{s}
- Declination: −02° 57′ 18.76″
- Redshift: 0.008079
- Heliocentric radial velocity: 2422 km/s
- Distance: 109 Mly (33.3 Mpc)
- Apparent magnitude (V): 12.5
- Apparent magnitude (B): 13.5

Characteristics
- Type: S0^{−} pec
- Size: 32,300 ly (9,890 pc)
- Apparent size (V): 1.1′ × 0.9′
- Notable features: Starburst galaxy

Other designations
- Mrk 603, MCG-01-09-005, PGC 11774

NGC 1222 is an early-type lenticular galaxy located in the constellation of Eridanus. The galaxy was discovered on 5 December 1883 by the French astronomer Édouard Stephan. John Louis Emil Dreyer, the compiler of the New General Catalogue, described it as a "pretty faint, small, round nebula" and noted the presence of a "very faint star" superposed on the galaxy.

NGC 1222's morphological type of S0^{−} would suggest that it should have a mostly smooth profile and a very dull appearance. However, the galaxy was imaged by the Hubble Space Telescope in 2016, and the image showed that there were several bright blue star forming regions, as well as dark reddish areas of interstellar dust.

== Interaction ==
NGC 1222 is currently interacting with and swallowing two dwarf galaxies that are supplying the gas and dust needed to become a starburst galaxy. The shockwaves produced by theses mergers causes some regions of NGC 1222 to heat up. There is also gas inflow.

== Supernova ==
One supernova has been observed in NGC 1222:

- SN 2024any (Type Ia, mag. 17.591) was discovered by ATLAS on 19 January 2024.

== See also ==
- NGC 1275, another starburst galaxy
