= NGC 4608 =

Galaxy in the constellation Virgo

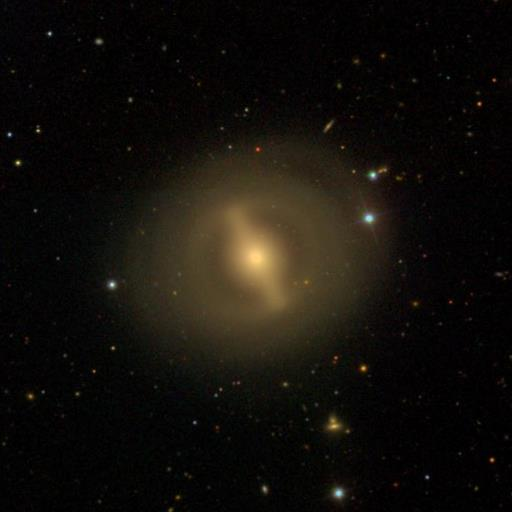
- SDSS image of NGC 4608.

Observation data (J2000 epoch)
- Constellation: Virgo
- Right ascension: 12^{h} 41^{m} 13.286^{s}
- Declination: +10° 09′ 20.38″
- Redshift: 0.00617
- Heliocentric radial velocity: 1850 km/s
- Distance: 56.4 ± 2.6 Mly (17.3 ± 0.8 Mpc)
- Group or cluster: Virgo Cluster
- Apparent magnitude (V): 11.97

Characteristics
- Type: SB0^{0}(r)
- Size: ~53,105.36 ly (estimated)
- Apparent size (V): 3.2′ × 2.7′

Other designations
- UGC 7842, MCG +02-32-177, PGC 42545

NGC 4608 is a barred lenticular galaxy located in the constellation of Virgo. The galaxy was discovered by astronomer William Herschel on March 15, 1784. At about 56 million light-years (17.3 megaparsecs) away, it is a member of the Virgo Cluster.

== Physical characteristics ==
NGC 4608 has a very well-defined bar. Surrounding the bar, there is an inner ring that is defined by a sharp inner edge. Outside of the inner ring, there is a low surface brightness disk that contains weak spiral features.

The center of NGC 4608 is a classical bulge, which is a bulge similar to an elliptical galaxy. The disk in NGC 4608 is practically considered non-existent. One explanation is that the bar in the galaxy was able to form without a disk. Another explanation says that a weak bar forms initially. Over time, the bar grows by causing the external disk to lose angular momentum therefore funneling material toward the bulge. Then the bar would be surrounded by a halo with very little or no disk left.

== See also ==
- List of NGC objects (4001–5000)
- NGC 4477
- NGC 4340
