= NGC 4598 =

Galaxy in the constellation Virgo

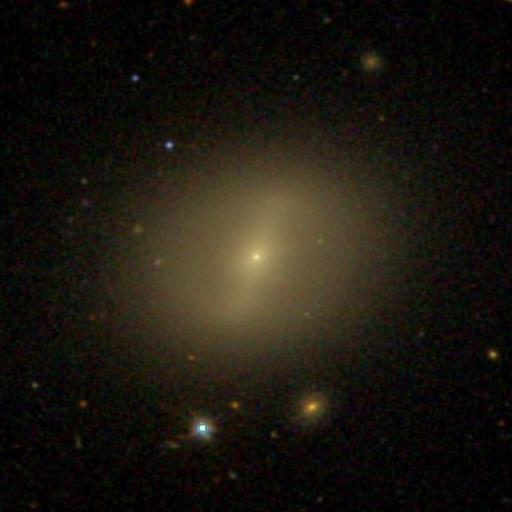
- Sloan Digital Sky Survey image of NGC 4598.

Observation data (J2000 epoch)
- Constellation: Virgo
- Right ascension: 12^{h} 40^{m} 11.9^{s}
- Declination: 08° 23′ 01″
- Redshift: 0.006541
- Heliocentric radial velocity: 1961 km/s
- Distance: 63.7 Mly (19.54 Mpc), 88.71 Mly (27.200 Mpc), 102 Mly (31.3 Mpc) (Redshift-based)
- Group or cluster: Virgo Cluster
- Apparent magnitude (V): 13.6

Characteristics
- Type: SB0
- Size: ~43,900 ly (13.45 kpc) (estimated)
- Apparent size (V): 1.47 x 1.06

Other designations
- CGCG 70-207, MCG 2-32-171, PGC 42427, UGC 7829, VCC 1827

NGC 4598 is a barred lenticular galaxy located in the constellation Virgo. NGC 4598 was discovered by astronomer William Herschel on April 15, 1784. The distance to NGC 4598 has not been accurately determined; measurements vary from 64 to 102 million light-years. According to the NASA/IPAC Extragalactic Database, its redshift based distance is 102 Mly (31.3 Mpc) while its redshift independent based distance is 88.71 Mly (27.200 Mpc). Also, according to SIMBAD, its distance is 63.7 Mly (19.54 Mpc). NGC 4598's average distance is 84.8 Mly (26.0 Mpc). NGC 4598 is usually considered to be a member of the Virgo Cluster. However, P. Fouqu´e et al. suggests it may be a background galaxy independent of the main cluster.

== See also ==
- NGC 1533

== Notes ==
1.This value was determined by using the three other measured values given above.
