= NGC 6814 =

Galaxy in the constellation Aquila

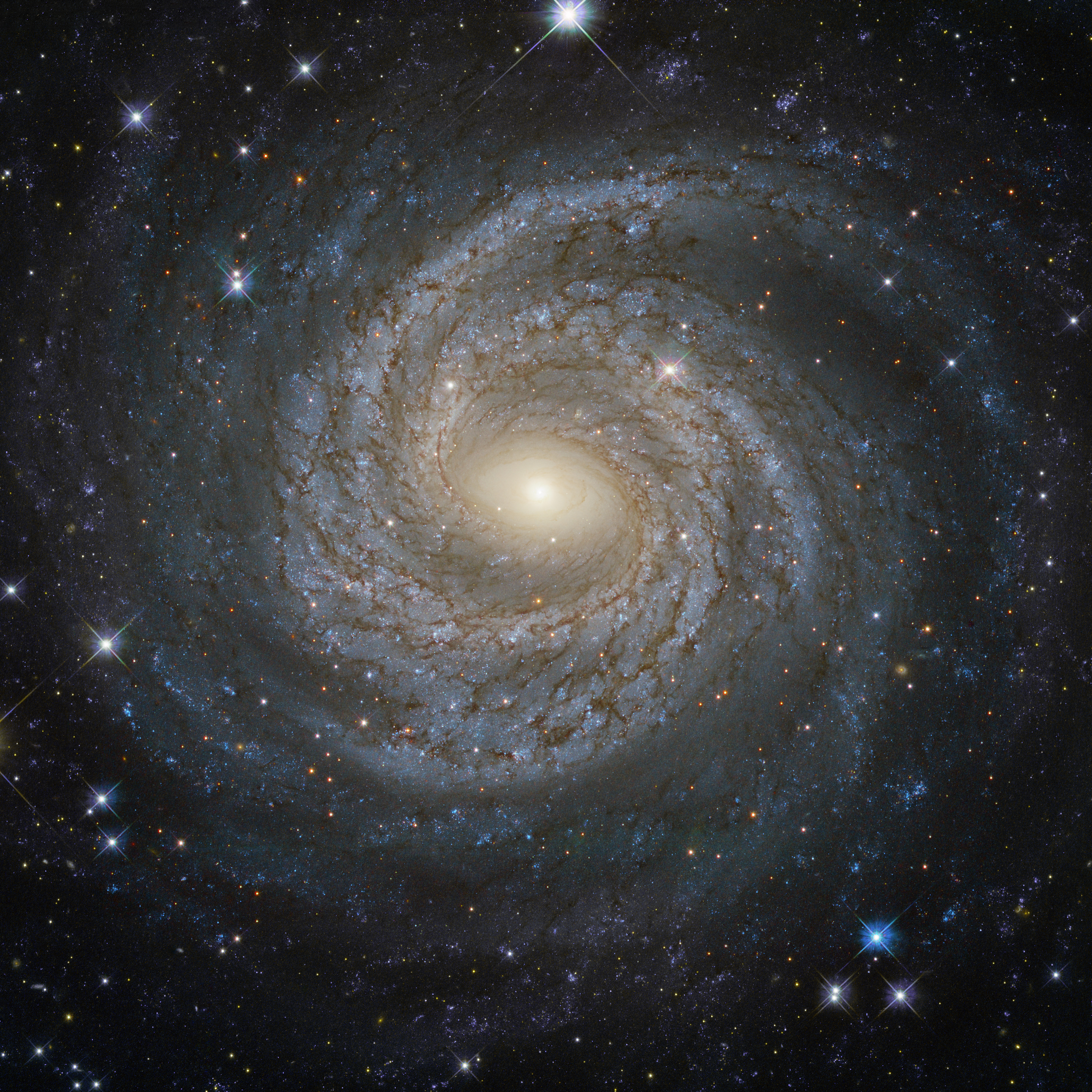
- NGC 6814 by Hubble Space Telescope

Observation data (J2000 epoch)
- Constellation: Aquila
- Right ascension: 19^{h} 42^{m} 40.6^{s}
- Declination: −10° 19′ 25″
- Redshift: 1563 ± 2 km/s
- Distance: 70.6 ± 1.3 Mly (21.65 ± 0.40 Mpc)
- Apparent magnitude (V): 12.1

Characteristics
- Type: SAB(rs)bc
- Size: 13.67 kpc (44,570 ly) (diameter; D_{25} isophote)
- Apparent size (V): 3.0′ × 2.8′

Other designations
- MCG -02-50-001, PGC 63545

NGC 6814 is an intermediate spiral galaxy in constellation Aquila. It is located at a distance of about 75 million light years from Earth, which, given its apparent dimensions, means that NGC 6814 is about 45,000 light years across. NGC 6814 has an extremely bright nucleus and is a type 1.5 Seyfert galaxy. The galaxy is also a highly variable source of X-ray radiation. The ultraviolet and optical emission also varies, although more smoothly, with time lag of two days. The cause of the lag and the smoothing of light curves is considered to be the reprocessing of the X-rays in the accretion disk. The cause of the active galactic nucleus is suspected to be a supermassive black hole with a mass about 18 million times that of the Sun. Many regions of ionised gas are studded along the dusty spiral arms.

== Gallery ==
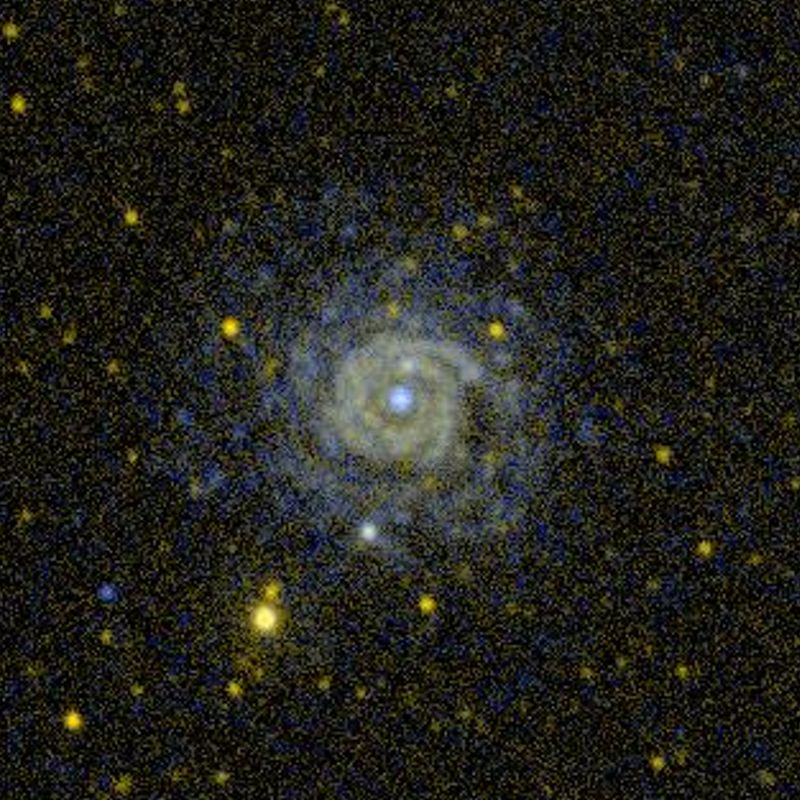
NGC 6814 by GALEX
