= NGC 2787 =

Galaxy in the constellation Ursa Major

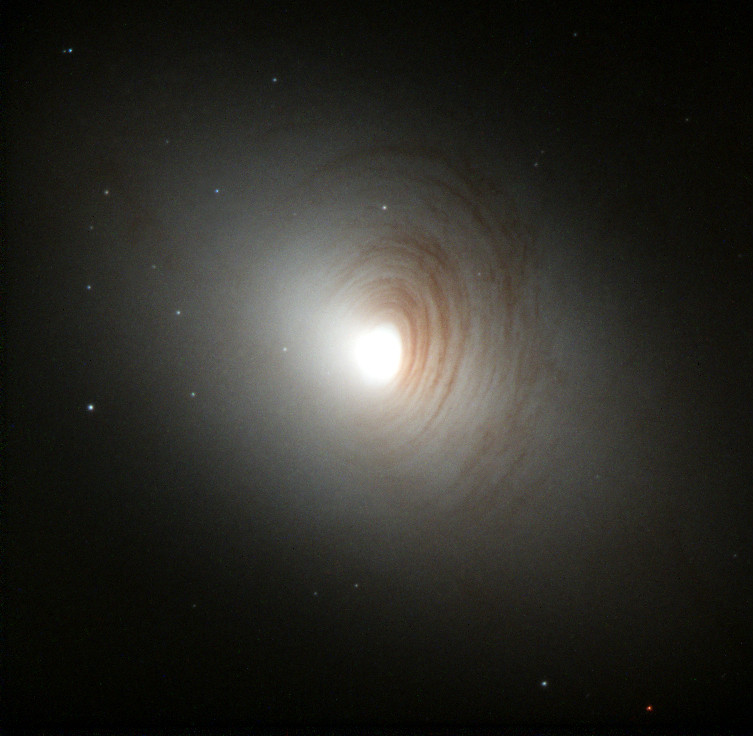
- NGC 2787 as observed by the Hubble Space Telescope (HST).

Observation data (J2000 epoch)
- Constellation: Ursa Major
- Right ascension: 09^{h} 19^{m} 18.60430^{s}
- Declination: +69° 12′ 11.6429″
- Heliocentric radial velocity: 627.3±13.2 km/s
- Distance: 24.17 ± 0.46 Mly (7.41 ± 0.14 Mpc)
- Apparent magnitude (V): 11.79
- Apparent magnitude (B): 12.92
- Absolute magnitude (B): −18.84

Characteristics
- Type: SB(r)0^{+}
- Mass/Light ratio: 50 M_{☉}/L_{☉}
- Size: 5.5 kpc
- Apparent size (V): 2′.530 × 1′.518 (NIR)
- Notable features: Barred lenticular; LINER

Other designations
- PGC 26341, UGC 4914

NGC 2787 is a barred lenticular galaxy approximately 24 million light-years away in the northern constellation of Ursa Major. It was discovered on December 3, 1788 by German-born astronomer William Herschel. J. L. E. Dreyer described it as, "bright, pretty large, a little extended 90°, much brighter middle, mottled but not resolved, very small (faint) star involved to the southeast". The visible galaxy has an angular size of 2.5 × 1.5 arcminutes or 3.24 × 1.81 arcminutes and an apparent visual magnitude of 11.8.

This galaxy is small and isolated with a morphological classification of SB(r)0^{+}, which indicates a barred spiral (SB) with a ring around the bar (r). Being a lenticular galaxy, it has the large halo of an elliptical galaxy. The disk is inclined at an angle of 58°±3° to the line of sight from the Earth, with the major axis aligned along a position angle of 110°±3°. The galaxy has an unusually high mass-to-light ratio, much greater than for a typical spiral galaxy. The distribution of the galaxy's neutral hydrogen forms a clumpy ring with a radius of 10.3 kpc, double that of the visible galaxy, with a mass of 5.5×10^{8} M_{☉}. This ring appears misaligned with the central disk.

NGC 2787 contains a low-ionization nuclear emission-line region (LINER) at its core, which is a type of region that is characterized by its spectral line emission from weakly ionized atoms. LINERs are very common within lenticular galaxies, with approximately one-fifth of nearby lenticular galaxies containing LINERs. The supermassive black hole at the center has a mass of 4.1+0.4
−0.5×10^{7} M_{☉}. The central region of the galaxy contains dust rings that are tilted with respect to the disk, which may be the result of an encounter with another galaxy.

NGC 2787 is part of the Ursa Major Cloud, which is part of the Virgo Supercluster.
