= LEDA 2108986 =

Galaxy in the constellation Boötes

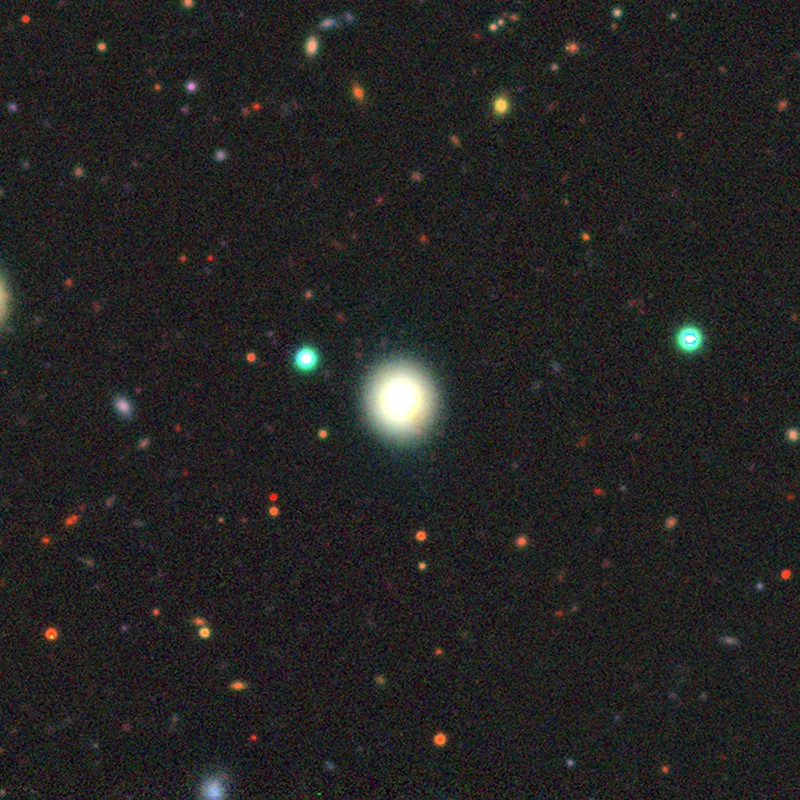

Observation data (J2000 epoch)
- Constellation: Boötes
- Right ascension: 15^{h} 03^{m} 15.557^{s}
- Declination: +37° 45′ 57.96″
- Distance: 45.7 Mpc (149 million ly) h^{−1}_{0.678}

Characteristics
- Type: ES, E/S0

Other designations
- 2MASX J15031550+3745580, SDSS J150315.54+374558.0

LEDA 2108986, also known by its Case Western Reserve University designation "Case Galaxy 611" (CG 611), is an extremely isolated, early-type dwarf galaxy with an embedded spiral structure residing in what is likely an intermediate-scale disk. The galaxy was discovered in 1987 by Sanduleak and Pesch, and is located at a distance of about 45.7 Mpc (149 million ly) in the Boötes Void and has no significant neighbours within 2.5 Mpc.

The galaxy may be a counterpart to the rectangular-shaped galaxy LEDA 74886, in that they both appear to contain an intermediate-scale disk. In the case of LEDA 74886, that disk is oriented edge-on to our line of sight. The "early-type galaxy" class is commonly known to contain elliptical galaxies (E) with no substantial stellar disk (perhaps just a small nuclear disk) and lenticular galaxies (S0) with their large-scale disks that dominate the light at large radii. Bridging these two types of galaxies are the ES galaxies with their intermediate-scale disks, referred to as "Ellicular" galaxies in recent works.

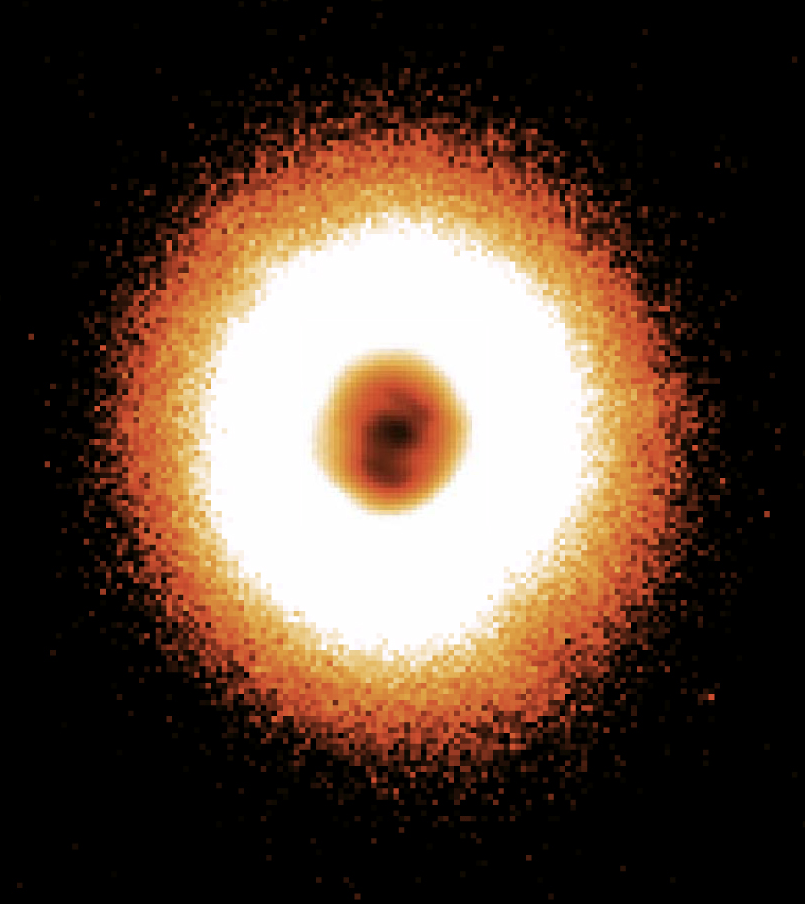
False color CFHT r-band image reveals the inner bar and spiral in galaxy LEDA 2108986 (aka CG 611)

.

== Importance ==
LEDA 2108986 has accreted a gas disk which counter-rotates relative to its stellar disk. It also displays a young spiral pattern within this stellar disk. The presence of such faint disk structures and rotation within some dwarf early-type galaxies in galaxy clusters has often been heralded as evidence that they were once late-type spiral or dwarf irregular galaxies prior to experiencing a cluster-induced transformation, known as galaxy harassment. The extreme isolation of LEDA 2108986 is proof that dwarf early-type galaxies can be built by accretion events, as opposed to disk-stripping scenarios within the "galaxy harassment" model.

== See also ==
- LEDA 74886
- NGC 1271
- Mrk 1216, NGC 1277, NGC 1332, NGC 4291
