= Prolate rotator galaxy =

Class of galaxy that is cigar shaped and rotates around its long axis

A prolate rotator galaxy, or spindle galaxy, is an unusual class of galaxy that is cigar-shaped and rotates around its long axis. A prolate rotator galaxy is an elliptical galaxy in prolate rotation, meaning they possess a significant amount of rotation around their major axis. To create a prolate rotator galaxy, two large spiral galaxies must collide at right angles. One forms the central bar, the other the disk. The bar then dominates the system.

As of 2017, 20 such galaxies were known. Their existence is also predicted by large-scale cosmological simulations.
