= Lenticular galaxy =

Class of galaxy between an elliptical galaxy and a spiral galaxy

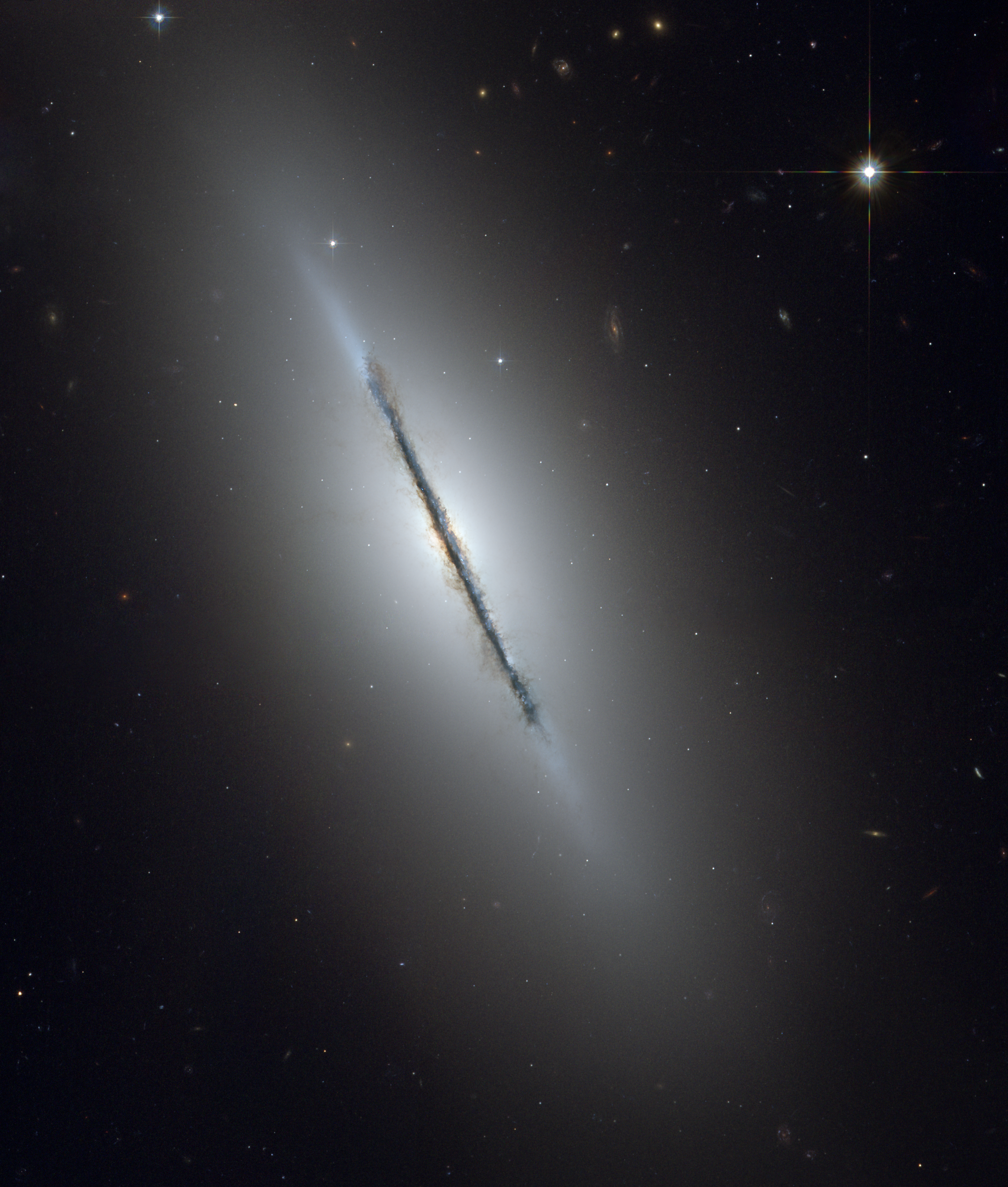
The Spindle Galaxy (NGC 5866), a lenticular galaxy in the constellation Draco. This image shows that lenticular galaxies may retain a considerable amount of dust in their disk. However, there is little to no gas, and thus they are considered deficient in interstellar matter.

A lenticular galaxy (denoted S0) is a type of galaxy intermediate between an elliptical (denoted E) and a spiral galaxy in galaxy morphological classification schemes. It contains a large-scale disc but does not have large-scale spiral arms. Lenticular galaxies are disc galaxies that have used up or lost most of their interstellar matter and therefore have very little ongoing star formation. They may, however, retain significant dust in their disks. As a result, they consist mainly of aging stars (like elliptical galaxies). Despite the morphological differences, lenticular and elliptical galaxies share common properties like spectral features and scaling relations. Both can be considered early-type galaxies that are passively evolving, at least in the local part of the Universe. Connecting the E galaxies with the S0 galaxies are the ES galaxies with intermediate-scale discs.

== Morphology and structure ==
=== Classification ===
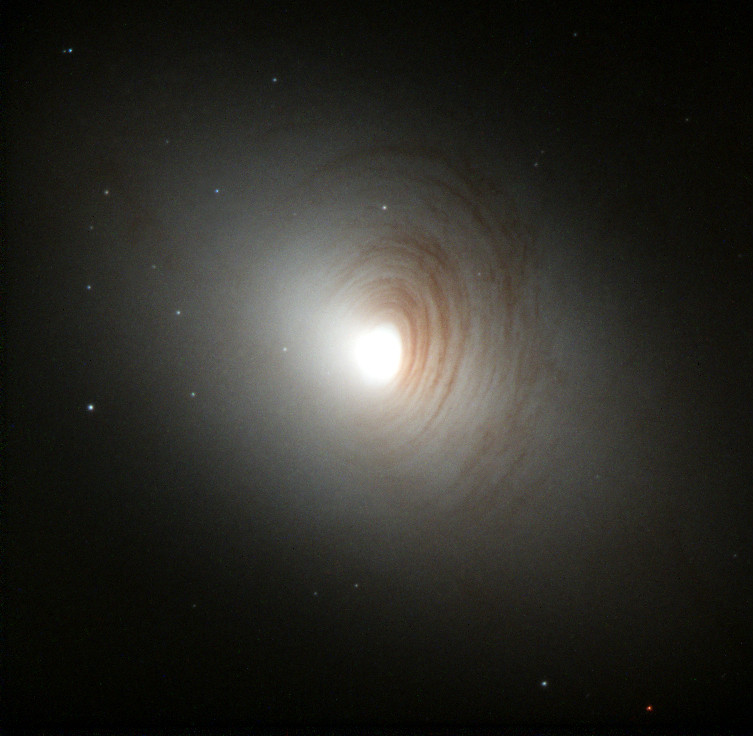
NGC 2787 is an example of a lenticular galaxy with visible dust absorption. While this galaxy has been classified as an S0 galaxy, one can see the difficulty in differentiating among spirals, ellipticals, and lenticulars. Credit: HST

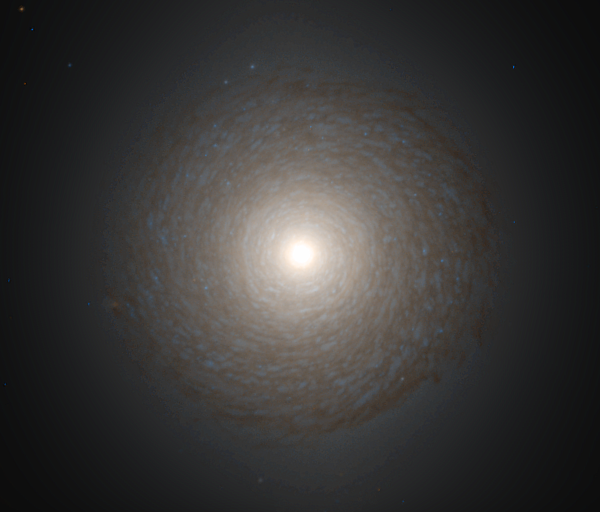
NGC 1387 has a large nuclear ring. This galaxy is a member of the Fornax Cluster.

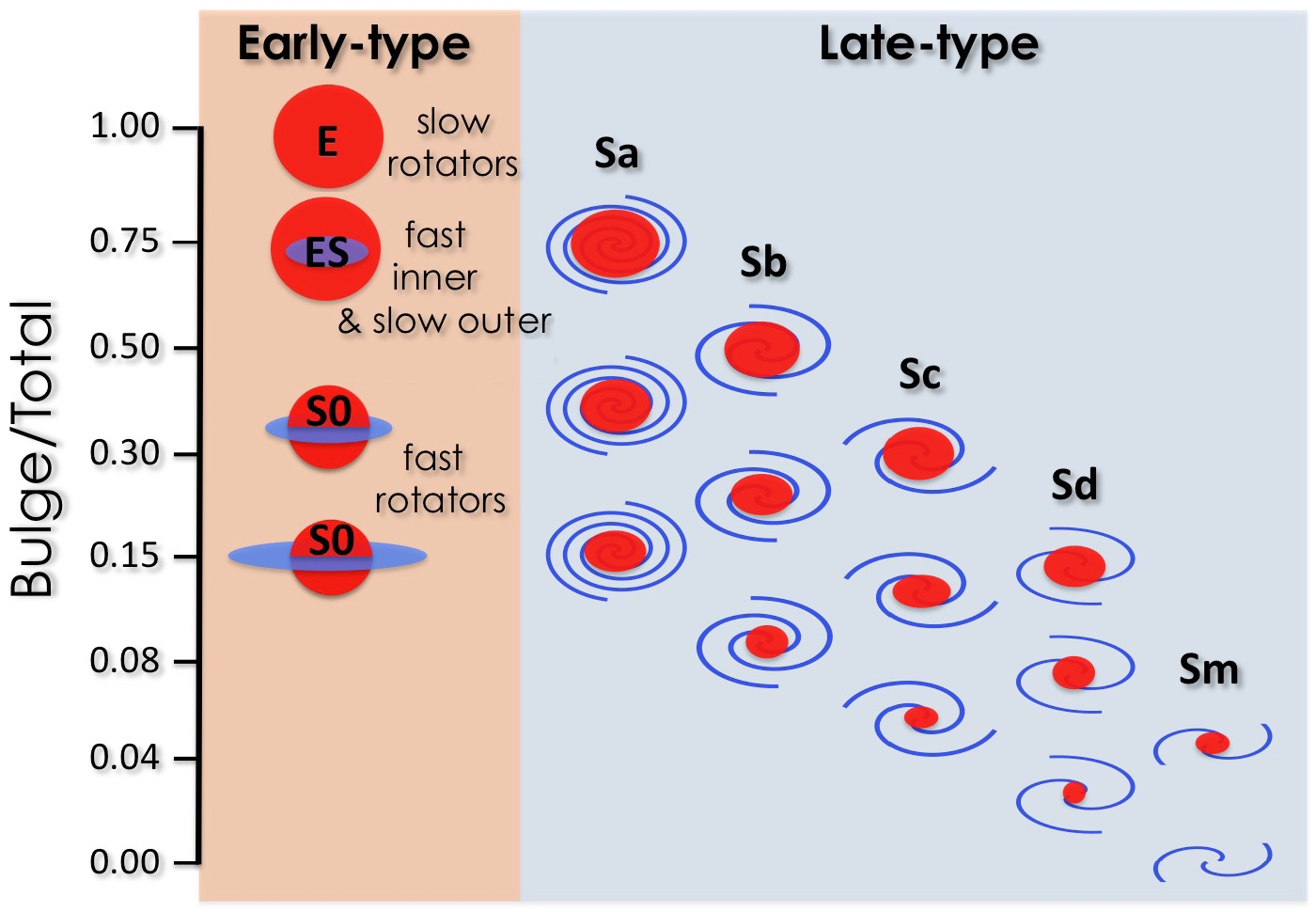
Grid showing the location of early-type galaxies (including the lenticular S0 galaxies) relative to the late-type spiral galaxies. The horizontal axis shows the morphological type, primarily dictated by the nature of the spiral arms.

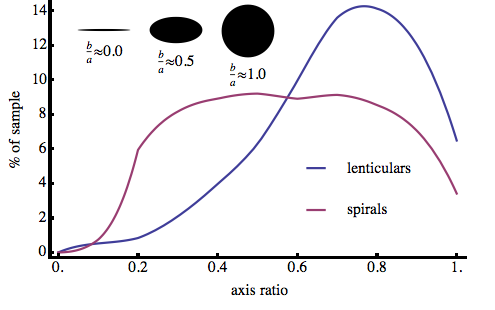
The percentage of galaxies with a particular axis ratio (minor/major) for a sample of lenticular and spiral galaxies. The inset is a visual representation of the profile of either at the specified minor (b) to major (a) axis ratios.

Lenticular galaxies are unique in that they have a visible disk component as well as a prominent bulge component. They have much higher bulge-to-disk ratios than typical spirals and do not have the canonical spiral arm structure of late-type (Note: Galaxies to the left side of the Hubble classification scheme are sometimes referred to as "early-type", while those to the right are "late-type".) galaxies, yet may exhibit a central bar. This bulge dominance can be seen in the axis ratio (i.e. the ratio between the observed minor and major axial of a disk galaxy) distribution of a lenticular galaxy sample. The distribution for lenticular galaxies rises steadily in the range 0.25 to 0.85 whereas the distribution for spirals is essentially flat in that same range. Larger axial ratios can be explained by observing face-on disk galaxies or by having a sample of spheroidal (bulge-dominated) galaxies. Imagine looking at two disk galaxies edge-on, one with a bulge and one without a bulge. The galaxy with a prominent bulge will have a larger edge-on axial ratio compared to the galaxy without a bulge based on the definition of axial ratio. Thus a sample of disk galaxies with prominent spheroidal components will have more galaxies at larger axial ratios. The fact that the lenticular galaxy distribution rises with increasing observed axial ratio implies that lenticulars are dominated by a central bulge component.

Lenticular galaxies are often considered to be a poorly understood transition state between spiral and elliptical galaxies, which results in their intermediate placement on the Hubble sequence. This results from lenticulars having both prominent disk and bulge components. The disk component is usually featureless, which precludes a classification system similar to spiral galaxies. As the bulge component is usually spherical, elliptical galaxy classifications are also unsuitable. Lenticular galaxies are thus divided into subclasses based upon either the amount of dust present or the prominence of a central bar. The classes of lenticular galaxies with no bar are S0_{1}, S0_{2}, and S0_{3} where the subscripted numbers indicate the amount of dust absorption in the disk component; the corresponding classes for lenticulars with a central bar are SB0_{1}, SB0_{2}, and SB0_{3}.

=== Sérsic decomposition ===
The surface brightness profiles of lenticular galaxies are well described by the sum of a Sérsic model for the spheroidal component plus an exponentially declining model (Sérsic index of n ≈ 1) for the disk, and often a third component for the bar. Sometimes there is an observed truncation in the surface brightness profiles of lenticular galaxies at ~ 4 disk scalelengths. These features are consistent with the general structure of spiral galaxies. However, the bulge component of lenticulars is more closely related to elliptical galaxies in terms of morphological classification. This spheroidal region, which dominates the inner structure of lenticular galaxies, has a steeper surface brightness profile (Sérsic index typically ranging from n = 1 to 4) than the disk component. Lenticular galaxy samples are distinguishable from the diskless (excluding small nuclear disks) elliptical galaxy population through analysis of their surface brightness profiles.

=== Bars ===
Like spiral galaxies, lenticular galaxies can possess a central bar structure. While the classification system for normal lenticulars depends on dust content, barred lenticular galaxies are classified by the prominence of the central bar. SB0_{1} galaxies have the least defined bar structure and are only classified as having slightly enhanced surface brightness along opposite sides of the central bulge. The prominence of the bar increases with index number, thus SB0_{3} galaxies, like the NGC 1460 have very well defined bars that can extend through the transition region between the bulge and disk. NGC 1460 is actually the galaxy with one of the largest bars seen among lenticular galaxies. Unfortunately, the properties of bars in lenticular galaxies have not been researched in great detail. Understanding these properties, as well as understanding the formation mechanism for bars, would help clarify the formation or evolution history of lenticular galaxies.

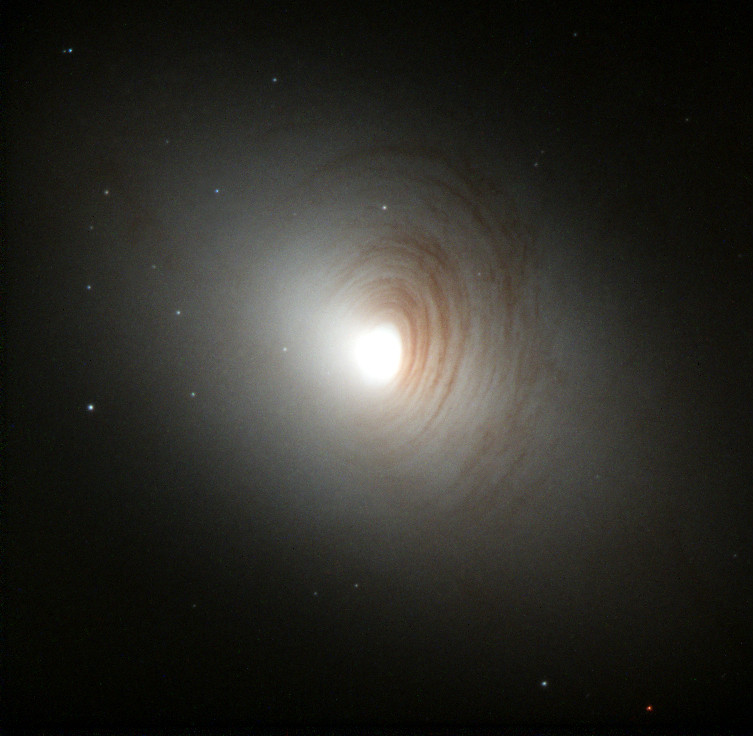
SB0_{1} (NGC 2787)

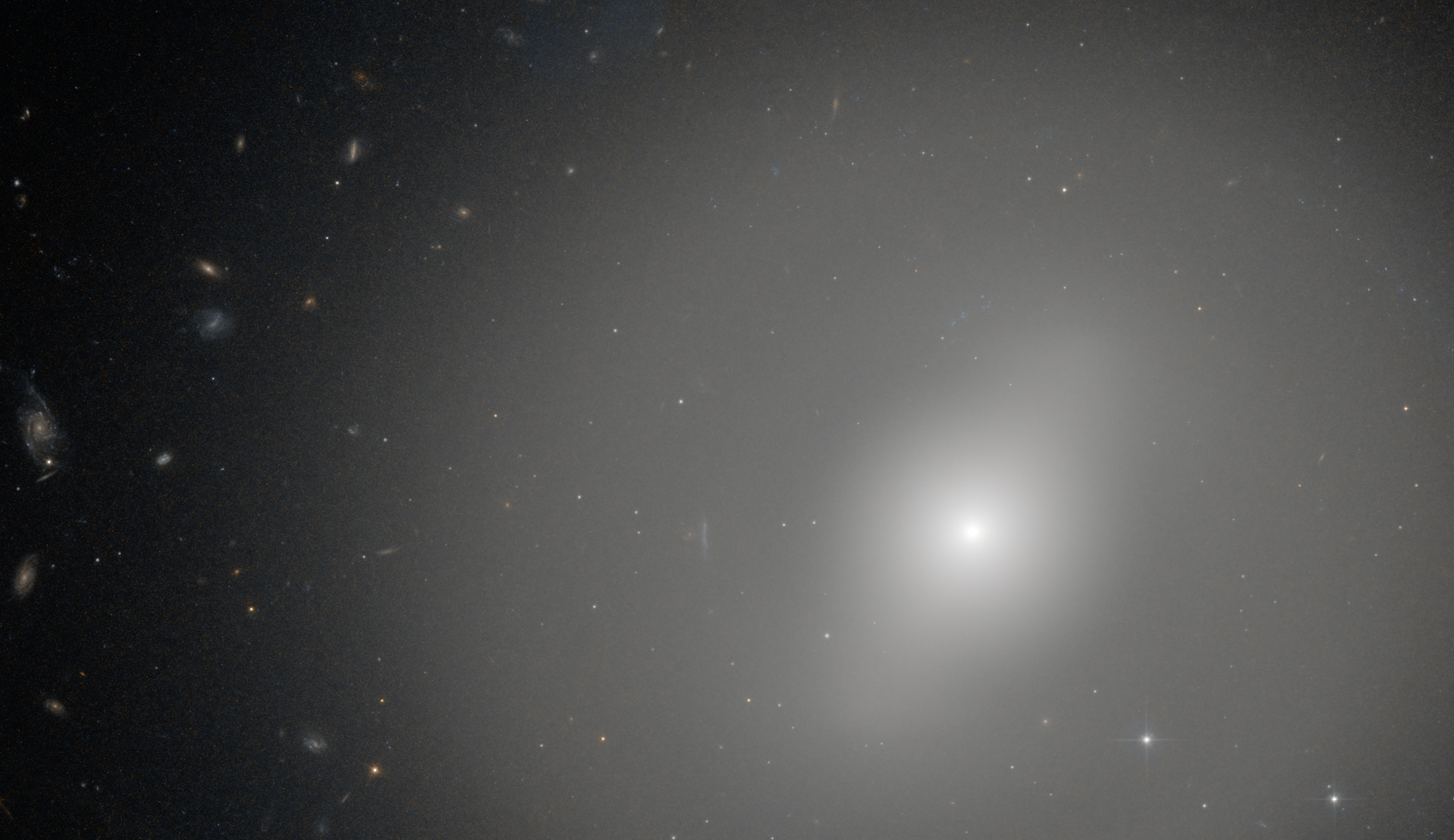
SB0_{2} (NGC 1533)

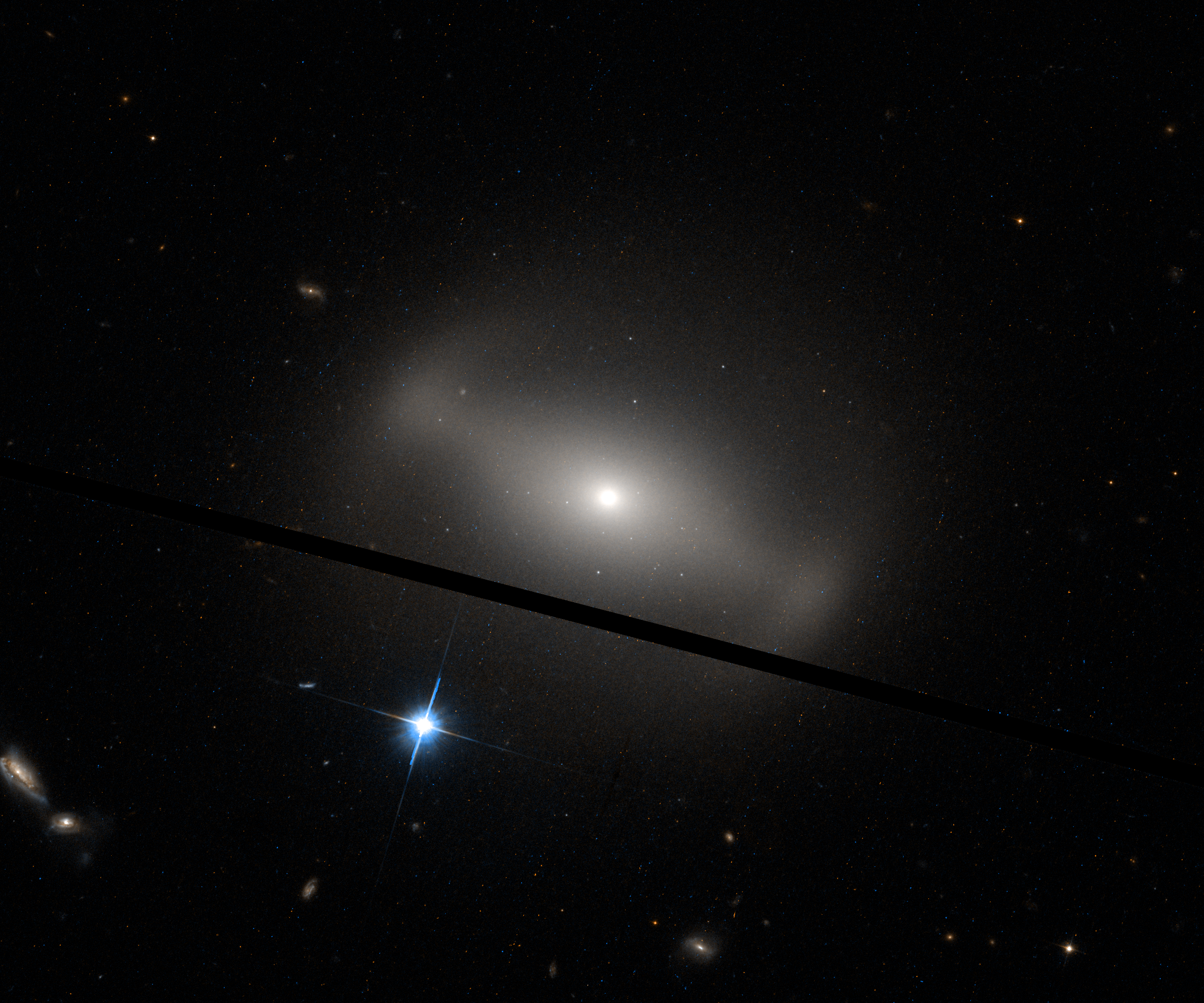
SB0_{3} (NGC 1460)

Barred lenticular galaxies by classification

=== Box-shaped bulges ===
NGC 1375 and NGC 1175 are examples of lenticular galaxies that have so-called box-shaped bulges. They are classified as SB0 pec. Box-shaped bulges are seen in edge-on galaxies, mostly spiral, but rarely lenticular.

=== Content ===
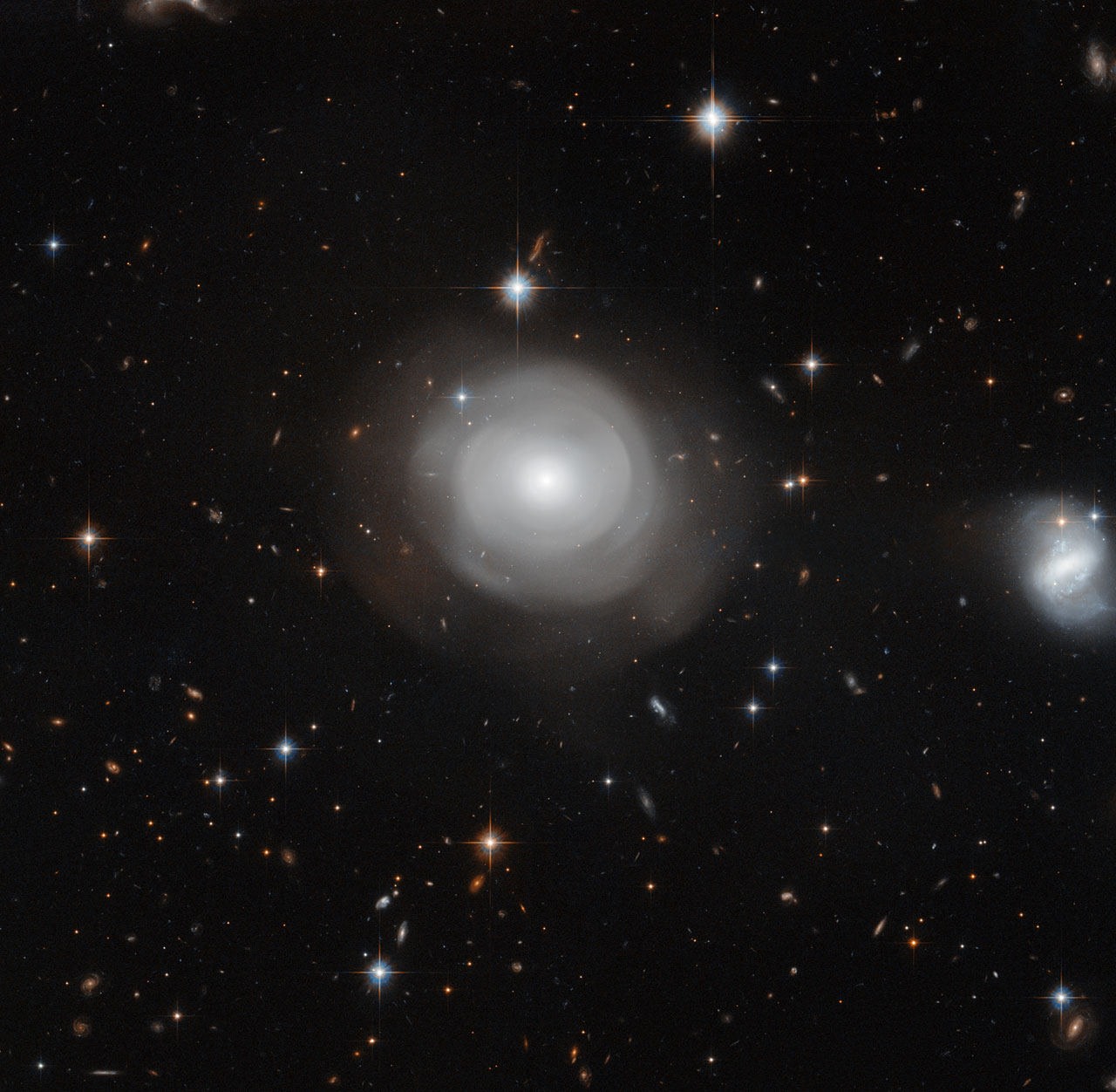
Hubble image of ESO 381-12

In many respects the composition of lenticular galaxies is like that of ellipticals. For example, they both consist of predominately older, hence redder, stars. All of their stars are thought to be older than about a billion years, in agreement with their offset from the Tully–Fisher relation (see below). In addition to these general stellar attributes, globular clusters are found more frequently in lenticular galaxies than in spiral galaxies of similar mass and luminosity. They also have little to no molecular gas (hence the lack of star formation) and no significant hydrogen α or 21-cm emission. Finally, unlike ellipticals, they may still possess significant dust.

== Kinematics ==
=== Measurement difficulties and techniques ===
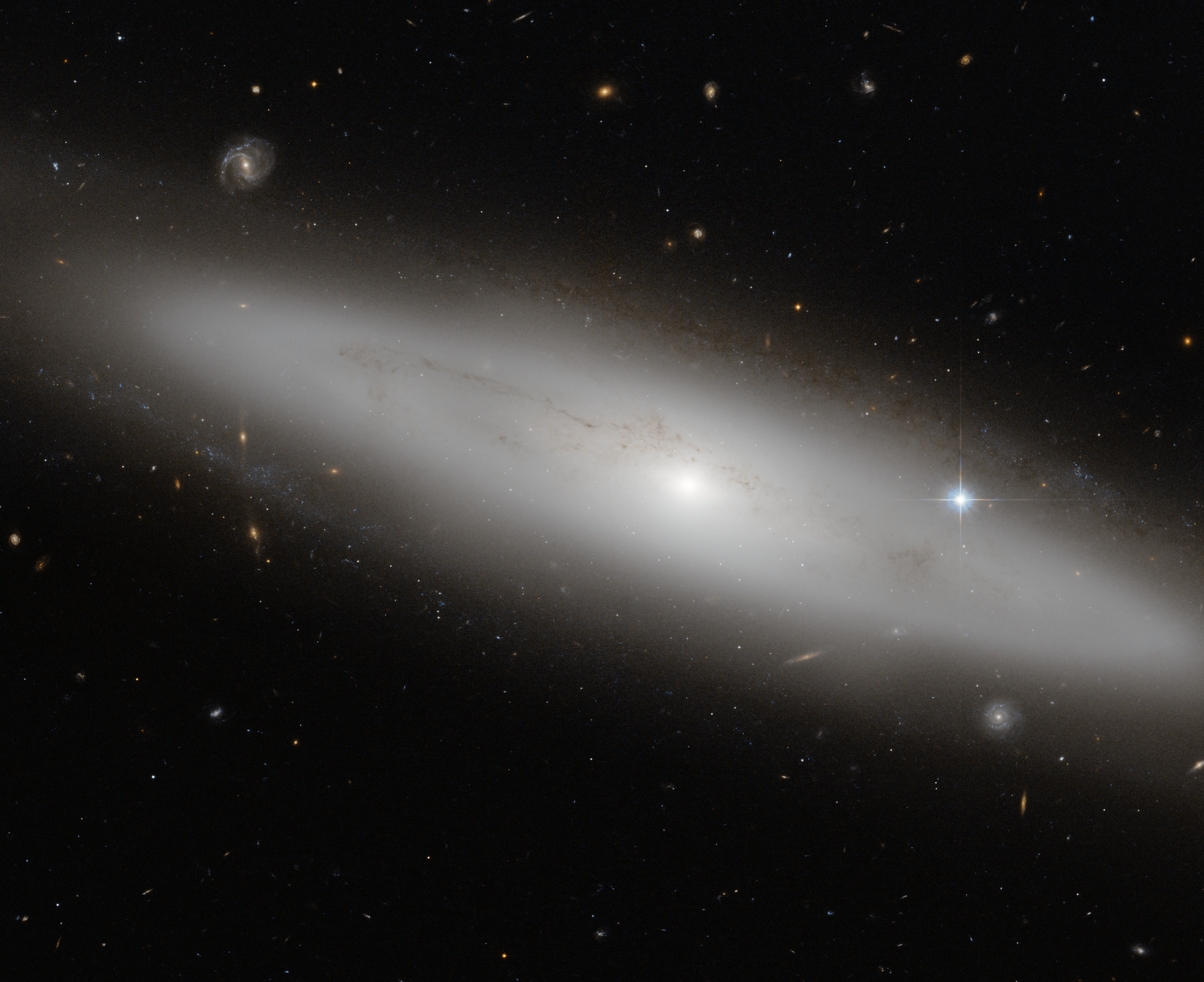
NGC 4866 is a lenticular galaxy located in the constellation of Virgo.

Lenticular galaxies share kinematic properties with both spiral and elliptical galaxies. This is due to the significant bulge and disk nature of lenticulars. The bulge component is similar to elliptical galaxies in that it is pressure supported by a central velocity dispersion. This situation is analogous to a balloon, where the motions of the air particles (stars in a bulge's case) are dominated by random motions. However, the kinematics of lenticular galaxies are dominated by the rotationally supported disk. Rotation support implies the average circular motion of stars in the disk is responsible for the stability of the galaxy. Thus, kinematics are often used to distinguish lenticular galaxies from elliptical galaxies. Determining the distinction between elliptical galaxies and lenticular galaxies often relies on the measurements of velocity dispersion (σ), rotational velocity (v), and ellipticity (ε). In order to differentiate between lenticulars and ellipticals, one typically looks at the v/σ ratio for a fixed ε. For example, a rough criterion for distinguishing between lenticular and elliptical galaxies is that elliptical galaxies have v/σ < 0.5 for ε = 0.3. The motivation behind this criterion is that lenticular galaxies do have prominent bulge and disk components whereas elliptical galaxies have no disk structure. Thus, lenticulars have much larger v/σ ratios than ellipticals due to their non-negligible rotational velocities (due to the disk component) in addition to not having as prominent of a bulge component compared to elliptical galaxies. However, this approach using a single ratio for each galaxy is problematic due to the dependence of the v/σ ratio on the radius out to which it is measured in some early-type galaxies. For example, the ES galaxies that bridge the E and S0 galaxies, with their intermediate-scale disks, have a high v/σ ratio at intermediate radii that then drops to a low ratio at large radii.

The kinematics of disk galaxies are usually determined by Hα or 21-cm emission lines, which are typically not present in lenticular galaxies due to their general lack of cool gas. Thus kinematic information and rough mass estimates for lenticular galaxies often comes from stellar absorption lines, which are less reliable than emission line measurements. There is also a considerable amount of difficulty in deriving accurate rotational velocities for lenticular galaxies. This is a combined effect from lenticulars having difficult inclination measurements, projection effects in the bulge-disk interface region, and the random motions of stars affecting the true rotational velocities. These effects make kinematic measurements of lenticular galaxies considerably more difficult compared to normal disk galaxies.

=== Offset Tully–Fisher relation ===
This plot illustrates the Tully–Fisher relation for a spiral galaxy sample (black) as well as a lenticular galaxy sample (blue). One can see how the best-fit line for spiral galaxies differs from the best-fit line for lenticular galaxies.

Since lenticular galaxies are an evolved stage of spiral galaxies then they should have a similar Tully–Fisher relation with spirals, but with an offset in the luminosity / absolute magnitude axis. This would result from brighter, redder stars dominating the stellar populations of lenticulars. An example of this effect can be seen in the adjacent plot. One can clearly see that the best-fit lines for the spiral galaxy data and the lenticular galaxy have the same slope (and thus follow the same Tully–Fisher relation), but are offset by ΔI ≈ 1.5. This implies that lenticular galaxies were once spiral galaxies but are now dominated by old, red stars.

== Formation theories ==
The morphology and kinematics of lenticular galaxies each, to a degree, suggest a mode of galaxy formation. Their disk-like, possibly dusty, appearance suggests they come from faded spiral galaxies, whose arm features disappeared. However, some lenticular galaxies are more luminous than spiral galaxies, which suggests that they are not merely the faded remnants of spiral galaxies. Lenticular galaxies might result from a galaxy merger, which increase the total stellar mass and might give the newly merged galaxy a disk-like, arm-less appearance. Alternatively, it has been proposed that they grew their disks via (gas and minor merger) accretion events. It had previously been suggested that the evolution of luminous lenticular galaxies may be closely linked to that of elliptical galaxies, whereas fainter lenticulars might be more closely associated with ram-pressure stripped spiral galaxies, although this latter galaxy harassment scenario has since been queried due to the existence of extremely isolated, low-luminosity lenticular galaxies such as LEDA 2108986.

=== Faded spirals ===
The absence of gas, presence of dust, lack of recent star formation, and rotational support are all attributes one might expect of a spiral galaxy which had used up all of its gas in the formation of stars. This possibility is further enhanced by the existence of gas poor, or "anemic", spiral galaxies. If the spiral pattern then dissipated the resulting galaxy would be similar to many lenticulars. Moore et al. also document that tidal harassment – the gravitational effects from other, near-by galaxies – could aid this process in dense regions. The clearest support for this theory, however, is their adherence to slightly shifted version of Tully–Fisher relation, discussed above.

A 2012 paper that suggests a new classification system, first proposed by the Canadian astronomer Sidney van den Bergh, for lenticular and dwarf spheroidal galaxies (S0a-S0b-S0c-dSph) that parallels the Hubble sequence for spirals and irregulars (Sa-Sb-Sc-Im) reinforces this idea showing how the spiral–irregular sequence is very similar to this new one for lenticulars and dwarf ellipticals.

=== Mergers ===
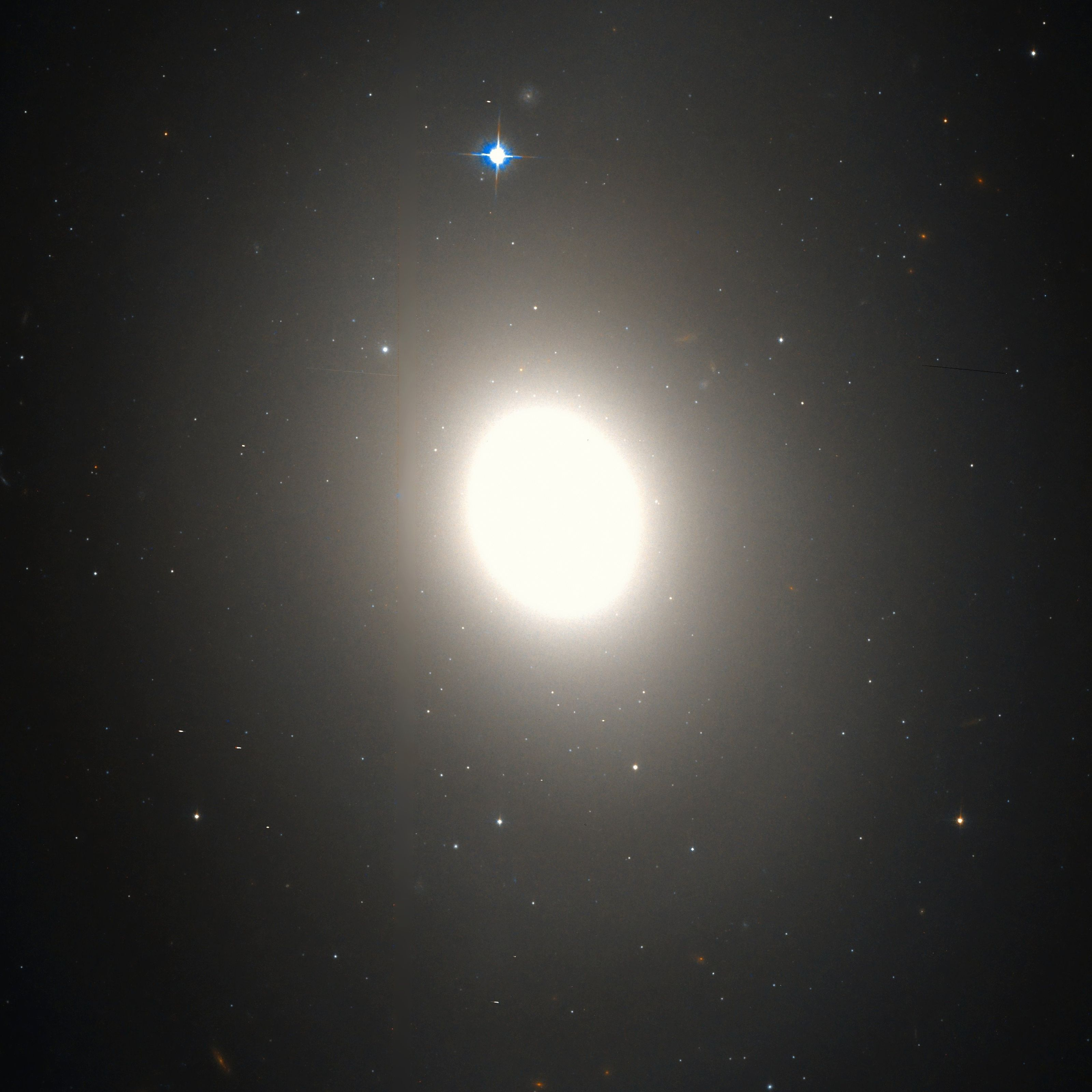
Messier 85 is a merged galaxy.

The analyses of Burstein and Sandage showed that lenticular galaxies typically have surface brightness much greater than other spiral classes. It is also thought that lenticular galaxies exhibit a larger bulge-to-disk ratio than spiral galaxies and this may be inconsistent with simple fading from a spiral. If S0s were formed by mergers of other spirals these observations would be fitting and it would also account for the increased frequency of globular clusters. It should be mentioned, however, that advanced models of the central bulge which include both a general Sersic profile and bar indicate a smaller bulge, and thus a lessened inconsistency. Mergers are also unable to account for the offset from the Tully–Fisher relation without assuming that the merged galaxies were quite different from those we see today.

=== Disk growth via accretion ===
The creation of disks in, at least some, lenticular galaxies via the accretion of gas, and small galaxies, around a pre-existing spheroidal structure was first suggested as an explanation to match the high-redshift compact massive spheroidal-shaped galaxies with the equally compact massive bulges seen in nearby massive lenticular galaxies. In a "downsizing" scenario, bigger lenticular galaxies may have been built first – in a younger universe when more gas was available – and the lower-mass galaxies may have been slower to attract their disk-building material, as in the case of the isolated early-type galaxy LEDA 2108986. Within galaxy clusters, ram-pressure stripping removes gas and prevents the accretion of new gas that might be capable of furthering the development of the disk.

== Examples ==
- Cartwheel Galaxy, lenticular galaxy about 500 million light-years away in the constellation Sculptor
- NGC 2787, a barred lenticular galaxy
- NGC 3115
- NGC 3632
- NGC 4608, a barred lenticular galaxy about 56 million light years away in Virgo
- NGC 5866
- NGC 1533 is a prototypical lenticular galaxy in the constellation Dorado

== Gallery ==
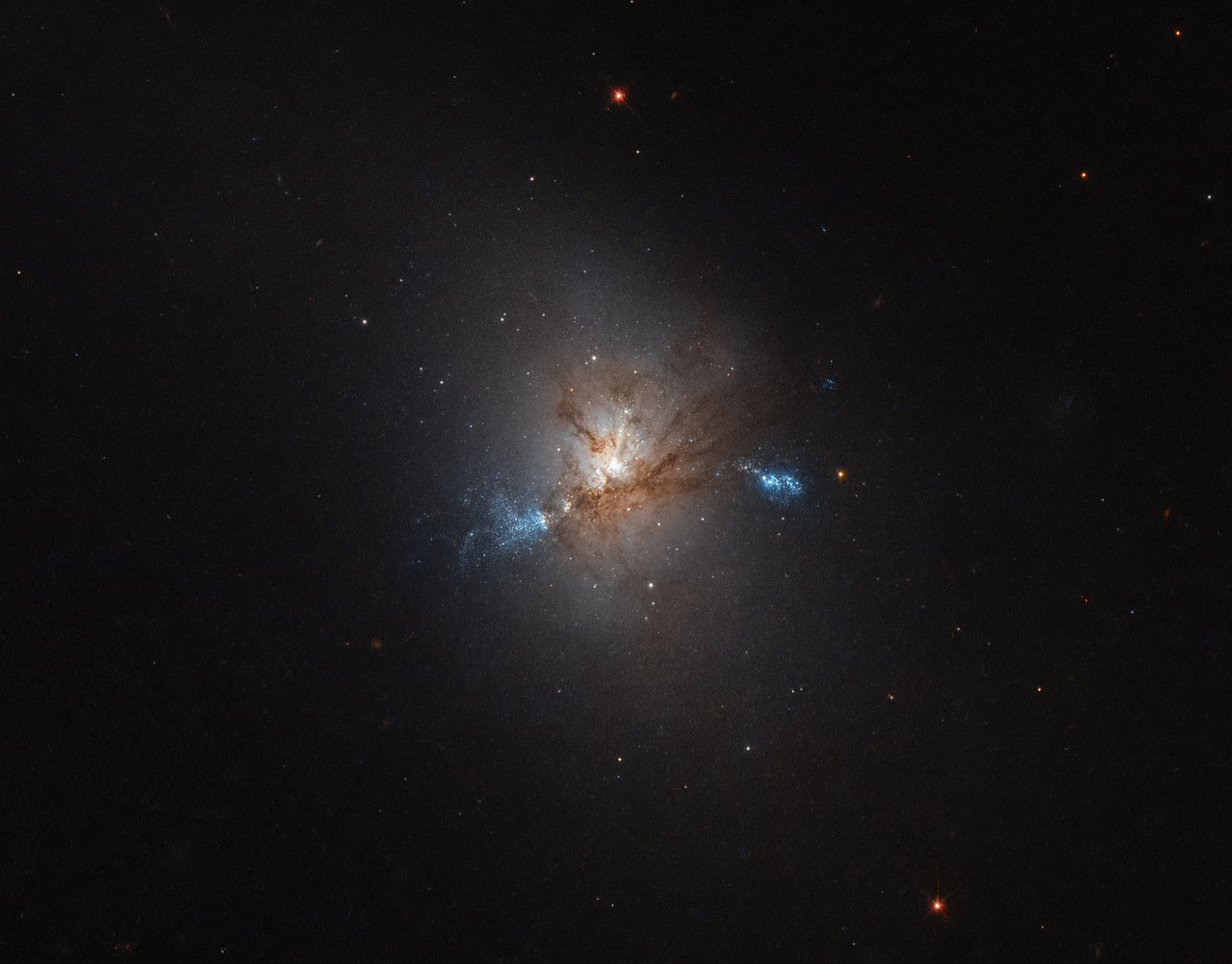
NGC 1222 contains three compact regions.

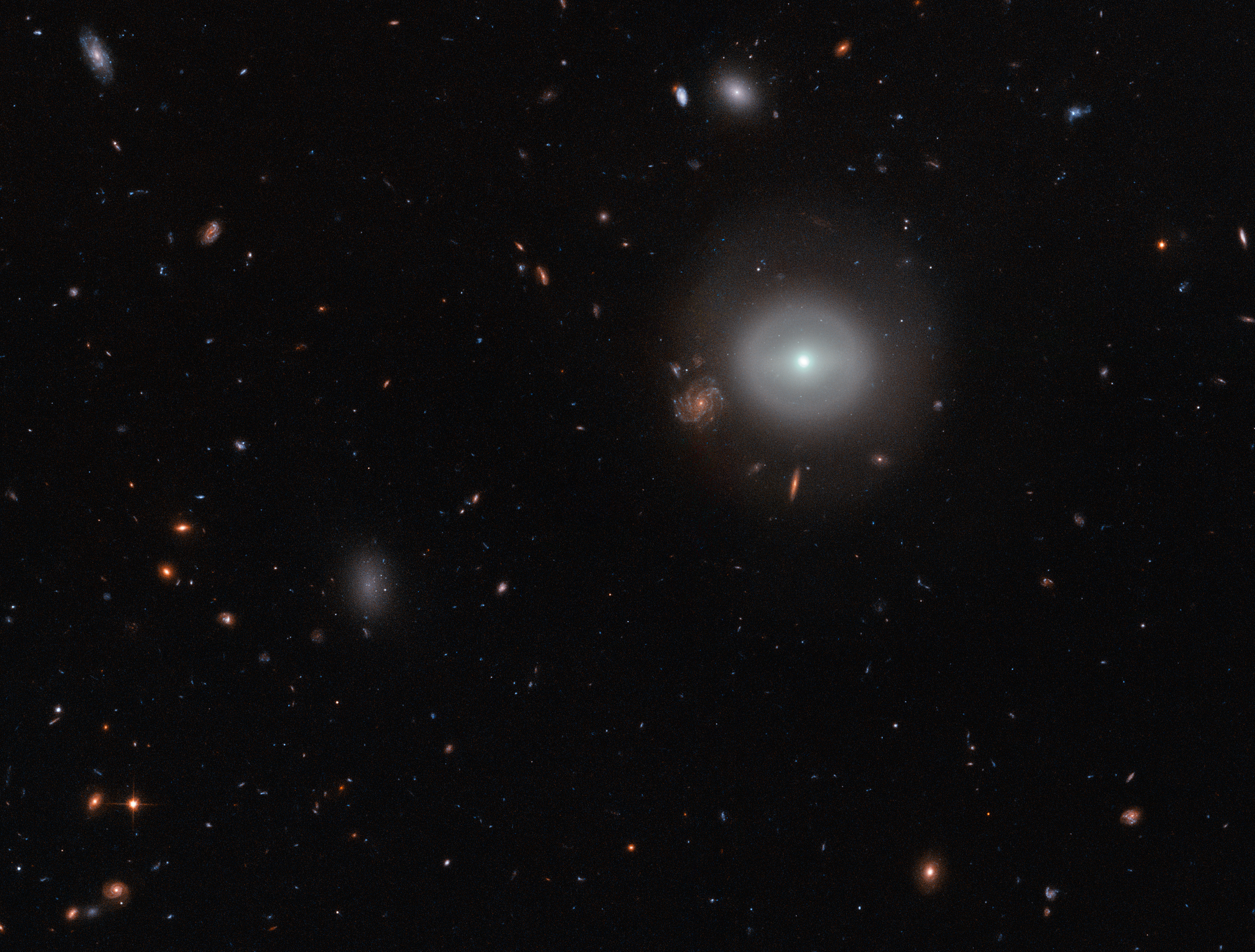
PGC 83677 image obtained as part of the Coma Cluster Survey

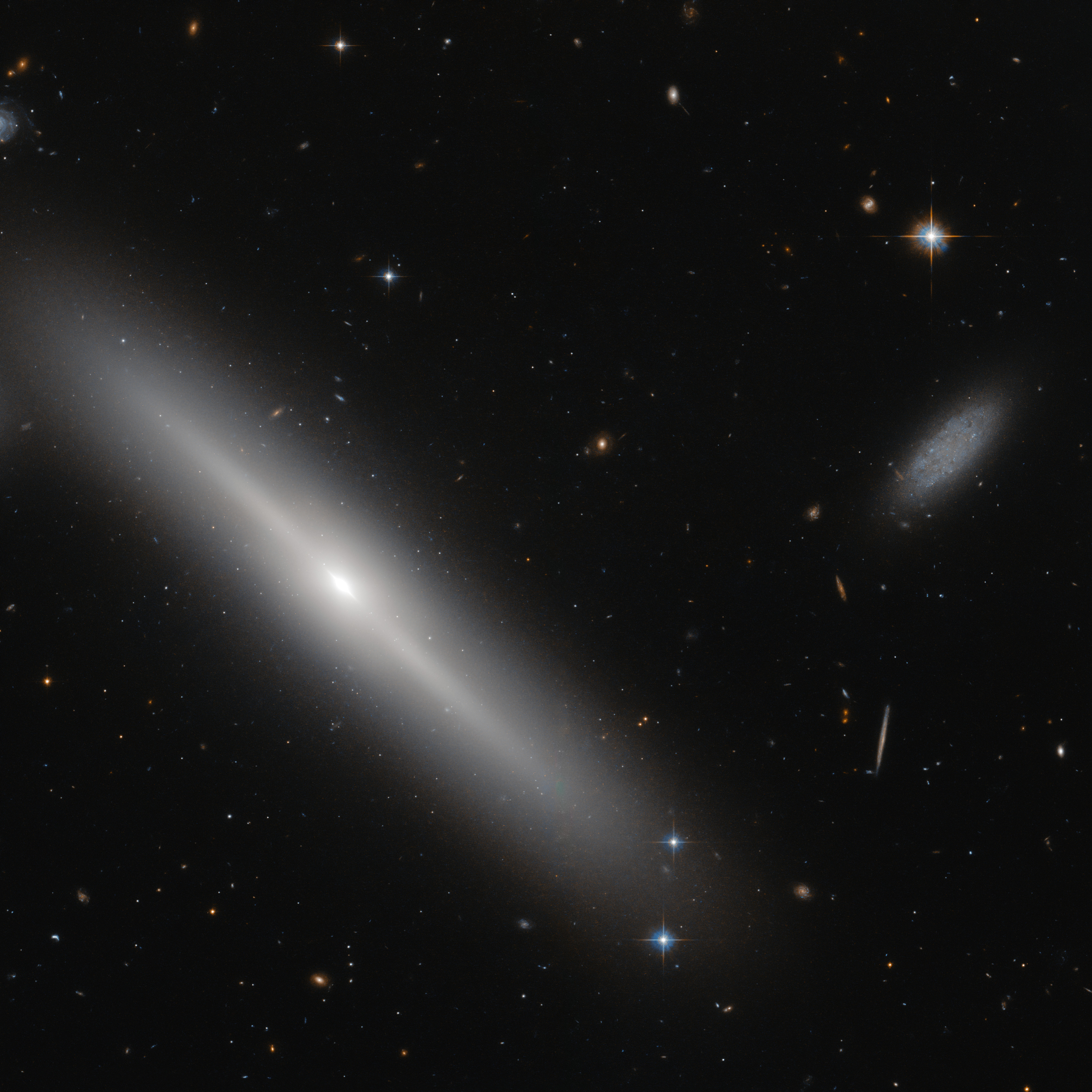
Lenticular galaxy NGC 5308 is located just under 100 million light-years away in the constellation of Ursa Major.

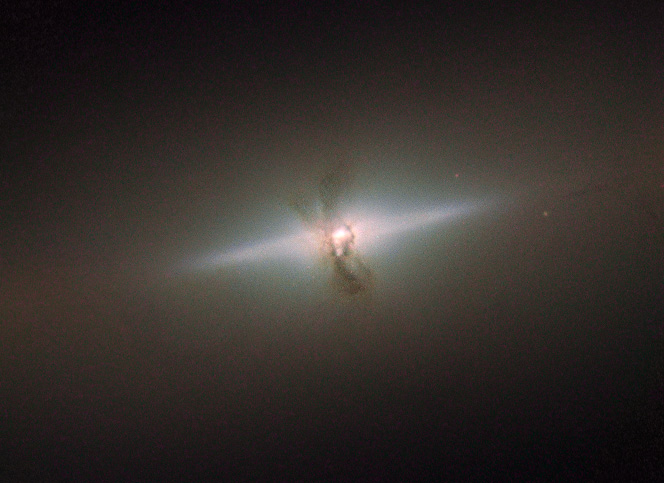
NGC 4111 is a lenticular galaxy, lying about 50 million light-years away in the constellation of Canes Venatici.

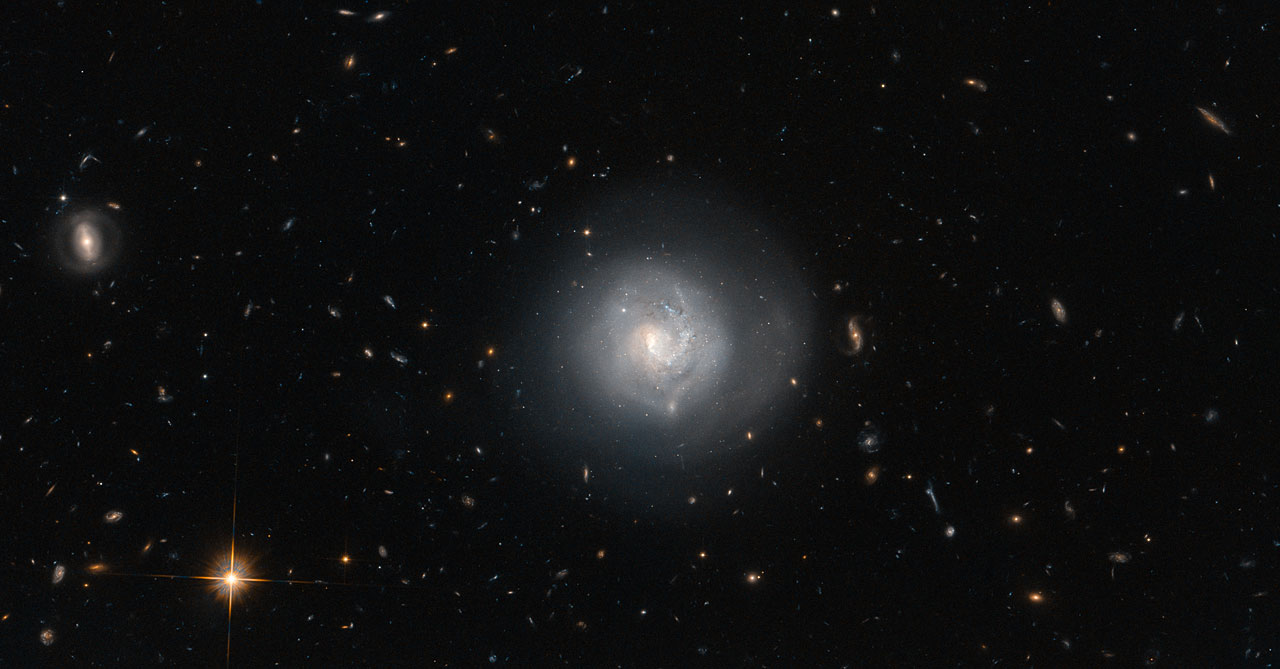
Mrk 820 is a lenticular galaxy classified as type S0 on the Hubble Tuning Fork.

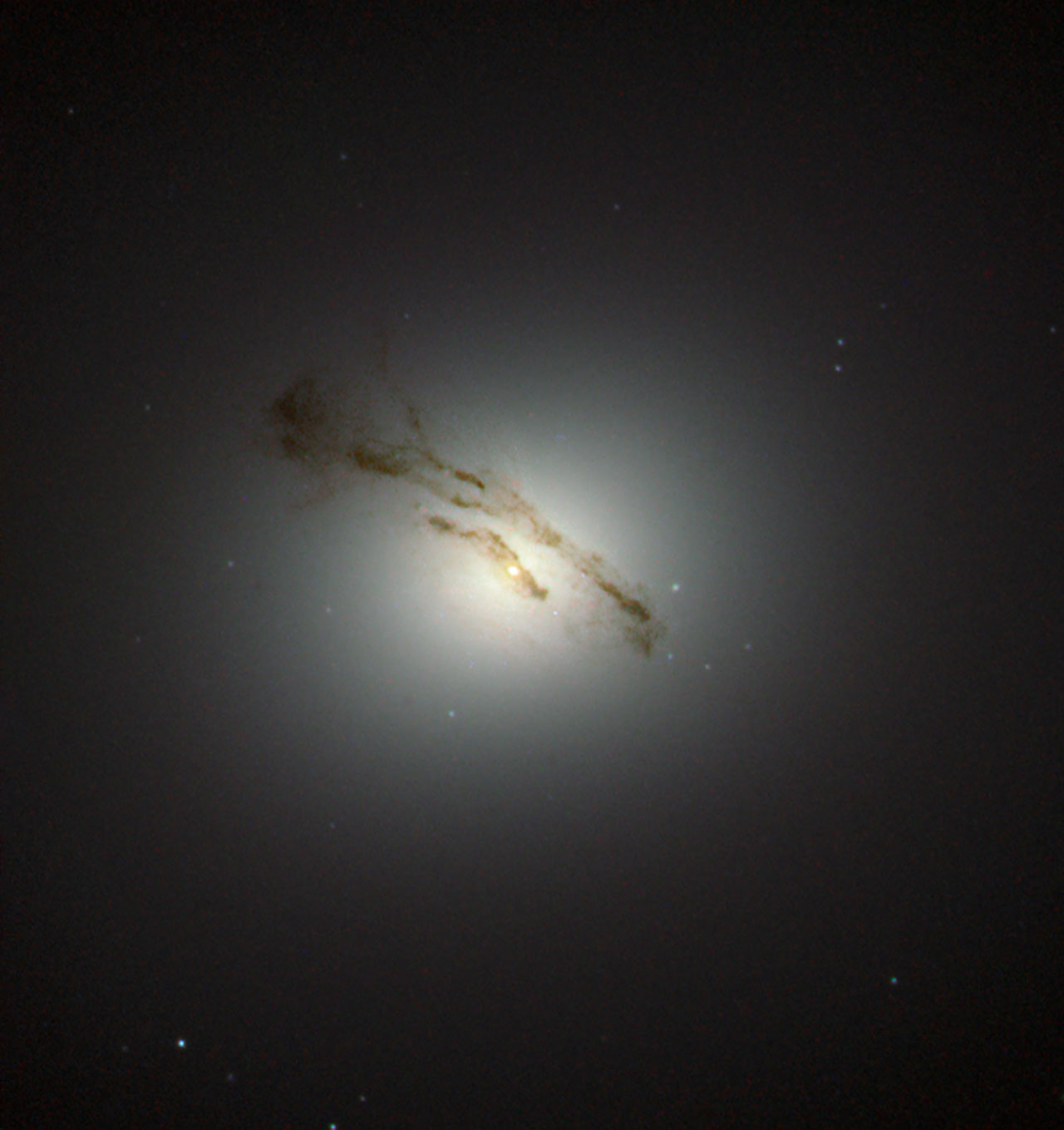
Messier 84 is a lenticular galaxy also known for its supernovae.

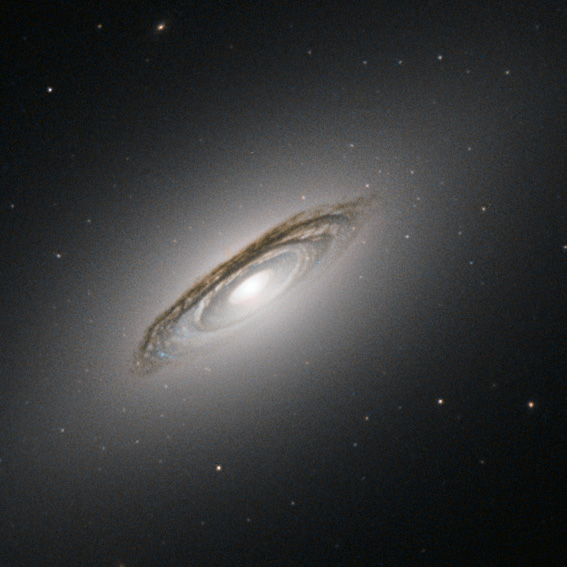
NGC 6861 is a lenticular galaxy discovered in 1826 by the Scottish astronomer James Dunlop.

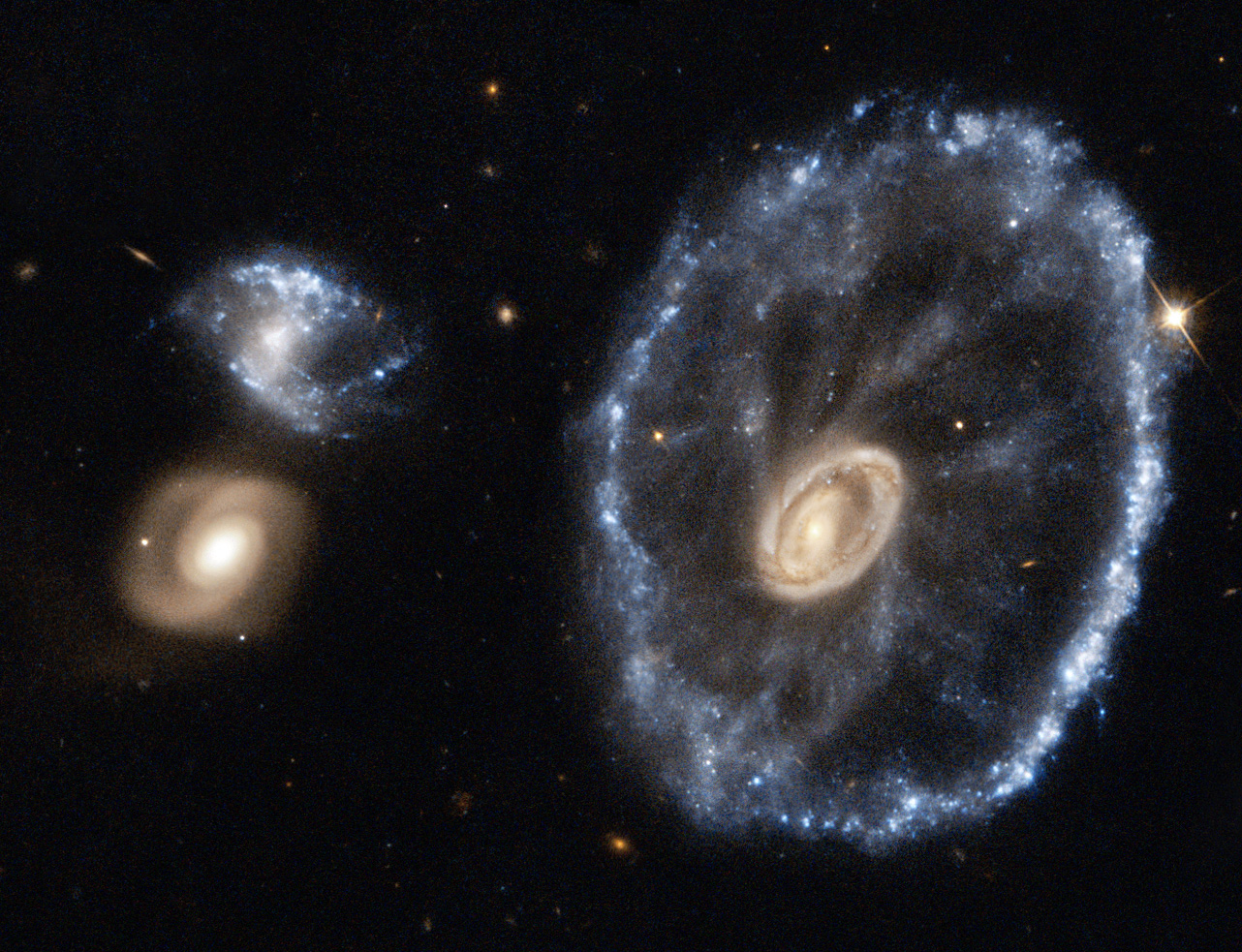
Cartwheel Galaxy

== See also ==
- Spindle galaxy – Class of galaxy that is cigar shaped and rotates around its long axis
