= List of stars in Fornax =

This is the list of notable stars in the constellation Fornax, sorted by decreasing brightness.

Name	B	Var	HD	HIP	RA	Dec	vis. mag.	abs. mag.	Dist. (ly)	Sp. class	Notes
α For	α		20010	14879	03^{h} 12^{m} 04.28^{s}	−28° 59′ 20.8″	3.85	3.05	46	F8V	12 Eri, Dalim, Fornacis; binary star; component B is a suspected variable, V_{max} = 6^{m}, V_{min} = 8^{m}
β For	β		17652	13147	02^{h} 49^{m} 05.36^{s}	−32° 24′ 22.6″	4.45	0.88	169	G8III	double star
ν For	ν		12767	9677	02^{h} 04^{m} 29.43^{s}	−29° 17′ 48.6″	4.68	−0.54	361	B9.5p (Si)	α^{2} CVn variable, V_{max} = 4.68^{m}, V_{min} = 4.73^{m}, P = 1.89 d
ω For	ω		16046	11918	02^{h} 33^{m} 50.71^{s}	−28° 13′ 56.4″	4.96	−0.76	453	B9V	double star
δ For	δ		23227	17304	03^{h} 42^{m} 14.90^{s}	−31° 56′ 18.2″	4.99	−1.77	733	B5III	
φ For	φ		15427	11477	02^{h} 28^{m} 01.69^{s}	−33° 48′ 39.8″	5.13	1.78	153	A2/A3V	
κ For	κ		14802	11072	02^{h} 22^{m} 32.42^{s}	−23° 48′ 58.7″	5.19	3.48	71	G2V	spectroscopic binary
μ For	μ		13709	10320	02^{h} 12^{m} 54.46^{s}	−30° 43′ 25.8″	5.27	0.23	332	A0V	
π For	π		12438	9440	02^{h} 01^{m} 14.80^{s}	−30° 00′ 05.6″	5.34	0.68	278	G8III	
γ^{2} For	γ^{2}		17729	13202	02^{h} 49^{m} 54.15^{s}	−27° 56′ 31.3″	5.39	−0.76	554	A1V	
η^{3} For	η^{3}		17829	13265	02^{h} 50^{m} 40.40^{s}	−35° 40′ 32.6″	5.48	−0.58	531	K2III	
ρ For	ρ		23940	17738	03^{h} 47^{m} 56.02^{s}	−30° 10′ 02.4″	5.52	0.83	282	G6III	suspected variable, V_{max} = 5.45^{m}, V_{min} = 5.55^{m}
AI For		AI	20729	15479	03^{h} 19^{m} 34.90^{s}	−24° 07′ 22.2″	5.63	−2.15	1173	M1III	semiregular variable
ζ For	ζ		18692	13942	02^{h} 59^{m} 36.07^{s}	−25° 16′ 27.6″	5.69	3.14	105	F3V	binary star
χ^{2} For	χ^{2}		21574	16112	03^{h} 27^{m} 33.37^{s}	−35° 40′ 52.8″	5.71	−0.06	464	K2III	suspected variable
ι^{1} For	ι^{1}		16307	12122	02^{h} 36^{m} 09.28^{s}	−30° 02′ 41.9″	5.74	−0.76	649	G8/K0III	
λ^{2} For	λ^{2}		16417	12186	02^{h} 36^{m} 58.62^{s}	−34° 34′ 38.4″	5.78	3.74	83	G1V	has a planet (b)
ι^{2} For	ι^{2}		16538	12288	02^{h} 38^{m} 18.60^{s}	−30° 11′ 38.0″	5.84	3.08	116	F5V	
ε For	ε		18907	14086	03^{h} 01^{m} 37.45^{s}	−28° 05′ 25.7″	5.88	3.47	99	G8/K0V	
λ^{1} For	λ^{1}		15975	11867	02^{h} 33^{m} 07.04^{s}	−34° 38′ 59.7″	5.91	0.58	380	K0/K1III	
σ For	σ		23738	17618	03^{h} 46^{m} 27.42^{s}	−29° 20′ 17.4″	5.91	0.89	329	A2V	
η^{2} For	η^{2}		17793	13225	02^{h} 50^{m} 14.75^{s}	−35° 50′ 37.3″	5.92	−0.01	500	K0III	double star
ψ For	ψ (Note: Designated K^{1} Eridani by Bode in his Uranographia)		18149	13473	02^{h} 53^{m} 34.35^{s}	−38° 26′ 13.5″	5.93	2.06	194	F5V	
HD 20606			20606	15357	03^{h} 18^{m} 02.49^{s}	−28° 47′ 49.3″	5.93	1.97	202	F3V+...	
HD 21430			21430	16029	03^{h} 26^{m} 22.52^{s}	−27° 19′ 03.4″	5.93	0.31	434	K0III	
HD 16975			16975	12608	02^{h} 42^{m} 06.59^{s}	−38° 23′ 01.4″	5.99	0.66	380	G8III	
τ For	τ		22789	17007	03^{h} 38^{m} 47.66^{s}	−27° 56′ 35.2″	6.01	0.47	417	A0V	
HD 11643			11643	8820	01^{h} 53^{m} 23.08^{s}	−38° 35′ 40.9″	6.09	0.77	378	K1/K2III	
HD 15471			15471	11524	02^{h} 28^{m} 35.46^{s}	−31° 06′ 08.6″	6.11	0.83	370	K2IIICN...	
γ^{1} For	γ^{1}		17713	13197	02^{h} 49^{m} 50.99^{s}	−24° 33′ 36.0″	6.14	0.91	363	K0III	multiple star
HD 18650			18650	13907	02^{h} 59^{m} 06.49^{s}	−28° 54′ 25.5″	6.14	1.05	339	K1III	
HD 20176			20176	15024	03^{h} 13^{m} 37.94^{s}	−29° 48′ 14.8″	6.17	0.46	452	K1IICN...	
HD 19545	ο (Note: In Bode’s Uranographia) (Note: This designation was dropped by Francis Baily)		19545	14551	03^{h} 07^{m} 50.80^{s}	−27° 49′ 52.0″	6.18	2.38	188	A3V	
HD 22262			22262	16628	03^{h} 33^{m} 56.81^{s}	−31° 04′ 49.1″	6.20	3.06	138	F5V	double star
HD 17168	θ (Note: This designation was dropped by Benjamin Gould)		17168	12786	02^{h} 44^{m} 20.52^{s}	−32° 31′ 28.8″	6.21	1.06	349	A1V	
HD 20293			20293	15125	03^{h} 15^{m} 00.28^{s}	−26° 06′ 01.5″	6.25	0.12	548	A1V	
HD 15889			15889	11802	02^{h} 32^{m} 14.72^{s}	−36° 25′ 38.4″	6.28	0.73	421	K0III	
HD 18466			18466	13768	02^{h} 57^{m} 12.91^{s}	−29° 51′ 19.0″	6.29	0.49	471	A2/A3V:+...	
HD 20144	ψ^{1} (Note: Designated ψ^{1} Fornacis by Bode in his Uranographia)		20144	14972	03^{h} 13^{m} 01.49^{s}	−35° 56′ 37.3″	6.29	0.45	479	B9IV/V	suspected variable
HD 12596			12596	9562	02^{h} 02^{m} 51.76^{s}	−23° 53′ 11.6″	6.30	−1.04	959	K2III	
HD 18735			18735	13947	02^{h} 59^{m} 38.30^{s}	−32° 30′ 26.0″	6.32	0.81	413	A0V	
HD 11050			11050	8369	01^{h} 47^{m} 47.77^{s}	−37° 09′ 34.3″	6.33	0.17	557	K0III	
HD 14412			14412	10798	02^{h} 18^{m} 58.65^{s}	−25° 56′ 48.4″	6.33	5.81	41	G8V	
HD 11183			11183	8480	01^{h} 49^{m} 19.36^{s}	−31° 04′ 20.7″	6.35	0.68	444	K2/K3III	suspected variable
HD 20980			20980	15700	03^{h} 22^{m} 16.28^{s}	−25° 35′ 16.1″	6.36	0.66	450	A1V	
HD 11262			11262	8514	01^{h} 49^{m} 48.86^{s}	−38° 24′ 12.5″	6.37	4.20	88	F6V	double star
HD 12135			12135	9207	01^{h} 58^{m} 26.68^{s}	−33° 04′ 00.3″	6.37	1.24	346	K0III	double star
HD 10863			10863	8233	01^{h} 46^{m} 00.99^{s}	−27° 20′ 55.4″	6.38	3.20	141	F2V	
HD 17926			17926	13363	02^{h} 51^{m} 56.16^{s}	−30° 48′ 53.2″	6.38	3.85	105	F6V	has three planets (b, c and d)
HD 21997			21997	16449	03^{h} 31^{m} 53.61^{s}	−25° 36′ 50.8″	6.38	2.04	241	A3IV/V	
χ^{1} For	χ^{1}		21423	15987	03^{h} 25^{m} 55.82^{s}	−35° 55′ 15.1″	6.39	1.39	326	A1IV	variable
HD 22322			22322	16672	03^{h} 34^{m} 33.58^{s}	−31° 52′ 29.3″	6.39	−1.75	1381	K3III	double star; suspected variable
HD 12563			12563	9521	02^{h} 02^{m} 28.27^{s}	−29° 39′ 56.4″	6.40	0.69	452	A3III	
HD 20853			20853	15585	03^{h} 20^{m} 45.18^{s}	−26° 36′ 23.6″	6.40	2.97	158	F7V	
HD 18546	(K^{3}) (Note: Designated K^{3} Eridani by Bode in his Uranographia)		18546	13789	02^{h} 57^{m} 32.63^{s}	−38° 11′ 27.4″	6.41	1.18	362	A0Vn	
HD 14988			14988	11212	02^{h} 24^{m} 20.10^{s}	−25° 50′ 51.0″	6.45	0.37	536	K3III	
HD 14890			14890	11121	02^{h} 23^{m} 06.60^{s}	−37° 34′ 33.8″	6.47	−1.31	1173	K2III	variable star, ΔV = 0.011^{m}, P = 4.12950 d
HD 13305			13305	10069	02^{h} 09^{m} 34.82^{s}	−24° 20′ 44.5″	6.48	2.51	203	F0IV/V	
HD 16589			16589	12300	02^{h} 38^{m} 24.75^{s}	−37° 59′ 25.4″	6.48	2.84	174	F6V	spectroscopic binary
HD 22333			22333	16697	03^{h} 34^{m} 52.37^{s}	−25° 34′ 58.5″	6.48	0.16	599	K0III	
χ^{3} For	χ^{3}		21635	16156	03^{h} 28^{m} 11.50^{s}	−35° 51′ 12.3″	6.49	1.26	362	A1V	double star
TY For		TY	15634	11644	02^{h} 30^{m} 13.67^{s}	−25° 11′ 11.5″	6.50	1.36	347	A9V:n	δ Sct variable; V_{max} = 6.49^{m}, V_{min} = 6.51^{m}, P = 0.05 d
η^{1} For	η^{1}		17528	13040	02^{h} 47^{m} 33.78^{s}	−35° 33′ 01.9″	6.51	0.12	619	K0/K1III	
HD 20423	ξ		20423	15218	03^{h} 16^{m} 11^{s}	30° 49′ 38″	6.62	0.63	183		
TZ For	ψ^{2} (Note: Designated ψ^{2} Fornacis by Bode in his Uranographia)	TZ	20301	15092	03^{h} 14^{m} 40.09^{s}	−35° 33′ 27.6″	6.89		567	F7III+G8III	Algol variable; V_{max} = 6.84^{m}, V_{min} = 7.05^{m}, P = 75.6675 d
HD 17627	υ (Note: This was mentioned in Gould’s Uranometria)		17627	13112	02^{h} 48^{m} 38.06^{s}	37° 24′ 03.59″	6.97		183		
HD 18377	(K^{2}) (Note: Designated K^{2} Eridani by Bode in his Uranographia)		18377	13656	02^{h} 55^{m} 50.71^{s}	−38° 39′ 02.53″	7.04	0.65	619	F2V	
HD 20782			20782	15527	03^{h} 20^{m} 03.58^{s}	−28° 51′ 14.7″	7.38	4.60	117	G3V	has a planet (b)
R For		R		11582	02^{h} 29^{m} 15.31^{s}	−26° 05′ 55.7″	7.50		2250	C...	Mira variable; V_{max} = 7.5^{m}, V_{min} = 13.0^{m}, P = 386 d
UX For		UX	17084	12716	02^{h} 43^{m} 35.57^{s}	−37° 55′ 42.5″	8.10		132.6	G6V+...	RS CVn variable; V_{max} = 7.97^{m}, V_{min} = 8.11^{m}, P = 0.956 d
HD 20707			20707	15432	03^{h} 18^{m} 52.95^{s}	−36° 07′ 37.54″	8.18	3.06	344	F3V	
HD 13167			13167	12716	02^{h} 08^{m} 13.8^{s}	−24° 41′ 43″	8.34		488	G3V	has a planet (b)
HD 20781			20781	15526	03^{h} 20^{m} 03^{s}	−28° 47′ 02″	8.44		115	G9.5V	has four planets (b & c & d & e)
HD 11231			11231	8501	01^{h} 49^{m} 38.0^{s}	−34° 27′ 33″	8.6		437	F5V	has a planet (b)
HD 20706			20706		03^{h} 19^{m} 20.52^{s}	−24° 48′ 09.52″	8.61	-0.79	2480	K4III	
AK For		AK	21703	16247	03^{h} 29^{m} 23^{s}	−24° 06′ 04″	9.14		101.6	K3V	low-mass eclipsing and spectroscopic binary; V_{max} = 9.14^{m}, V_{min} = 9.55^{m}, P = 3.9809913 d
WASP-72					02^{h} 44^{m} 9.6^{s}	−30° 10′ 09″	9.6			F7	Diya; has a planet (b)
HD 20868			20868	15578	03^{h} 20^{m} 42.69^{s}	−33° 43′ 48.4″	9.92	6.47	159	K3/4IV	Intan; has a planet (b)
HIP 13044				13044	02^{h} 47^{m} 37^{s}	−36° 06′ 27″	9.94		2286	F2	thought to have a planet (b), later disproven
UZ For		UZ			03^{h} 35^{m} 28.64^{s}	−25° 44′ 21.8″	18.2			M4.5	AM Her variable and eclipsing binary; V_{max} = 17.0^{m}, V_{min} = 20.9^{m}, P = 0.0878654325 d
LP 944-20					03^{h} 39^{m} 35.22^{s}	−35° 25′ 44.09″	18.69		20.9	M9	brown dwarf
UDF 2457					03^{h} 32^{m} 38.79^{s}	−27° 48′ 10.0″	25		59000	MV	one of the most distant stars known in the Milky Way
Table legend: • Name = Proper name • B = Bayer designation • F or/and G. = Flamsteed designation or Gould designation • Var = Variable-star designation • HD = Henry Draper Catalogue designation number • HIP = Hipparcos Catalogue designation number • RA = Right ascension for the Epoch/Equinox J2000.0 • Dec = Declination for the Epoch/Equinox J2000.0 • vis. mag. = visual magnitude (m or m_{v}), also known as apparent magnitude • abs. mag. = absolute magnitude (M_{v}) • Dist. (ly) = Distance in light-years from Earth • Sp. class = Spectral class of the star in the stellar classification system • Notes = Common name(s) or alternate name(s); comments; notable properties [for example: multiple star status, range of variability if it is a variable star, exoplanets, etc.]

== See also ==
- Lists of stars by constellation
- List of UDF objects (1–500)
