= Eta Fornacis =

Eta Fornacis may refer to three stars in the constellation of Fornax.

- Eta^{1} Fornacis
- Eta^{2} Fornacis
- Eta^{3} Fornacis
