= Lambda Fornacis =

The Bayer designation Lambda Fornacis (λ For / λ Fornacis) is shared by two faint naked-eye stars about a degree apart, in the constellation Fornax:

- λ^{1} Fornacis, HR 744
- λ^{2} Fornacis, HR 772, has a planet (b)
