= Iota Fornacis =

The Bayer designation ι Fornacis (Iota Fornacis, ι For) is shared by two stars in the constellation Fornax:

- ι^{1} Fornacis
- ι^{2} Fornacis
