= CoRoT-3b =

Brown dwarf or exoplanet orbiting CoRoT-3

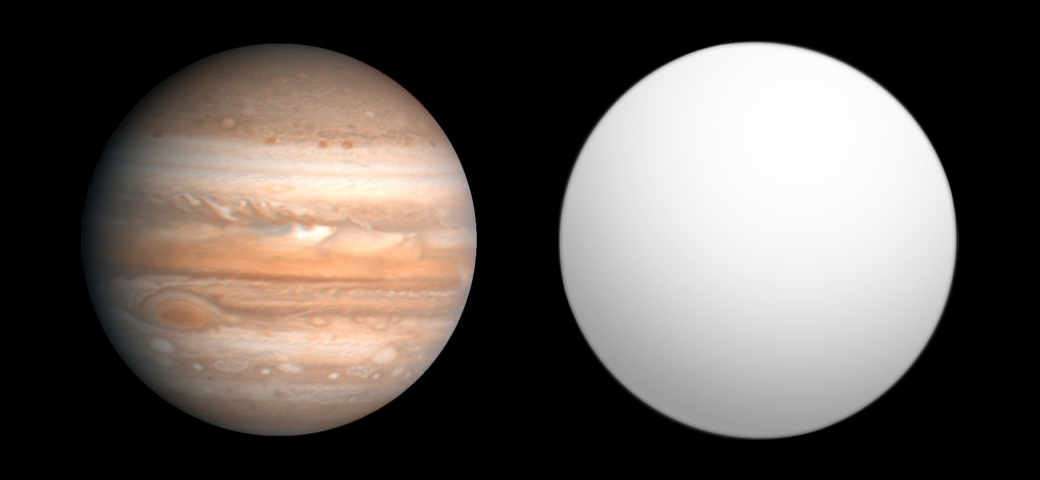
- Size comparison of CoRoT-3b with Jupiter

Observation data Epoch J2000.0 Equinox ICRS
- Constellation: Aquila
- Right ascension: 19^{h} 28^{m} 13.2642^{s}
- Declination: +00° 07′ 18.6143″

Characteristics
- Evolutionary stage: brown dwarf/Super-Jupiter (depending on definition)

Astrometry

Orbit
Primary	CoRoT-3
Period (P)	4.25680±0.000005 d
Semi-major axis (a)	0.057 ± 0.003 AU (8.53 ± 0.45 million km)
Eccentricity (e)	0
Inclination (i)	85.9±0.8°

Details
Mass	21.66 ± 1.0 M_{Jup}
Radius	1.01 ± 0.07 R_{Jup}

Other designations
- CoRoT-Exo-3b, CoRoT-3 Ab

Database references
SIMBAD	data

CoRoT-3b (formerly known as CoRoT-Exo-3b) is a brown dwarf or massive extrasolar planet with a mass 21.66 times that of Jupiter. The object orbits the F-type star CoRoT-3 in the constellation of Aquila. The orbit is circular and takes 4.2568 days to complete. It was discovered by the French-led CoRoT mission which detected the dimming of the parent star's light as CoRoT-3b passes in front of it (a situation called a transit).

== Physical properties ==
The mass of CoRoT-3b was determined by the radial velocity method, which involves detecting the Doppler shift of the parent star's spectrum as it moves towards and away from Earth as a result of the orbiting companion. This method usually gives only a lower limit on the object's true mass: the measured quantity is the true mass multiplied by the sine of the inclination angle between the normal vector to the orbital plane of the companion and the line of sight between Earth and the star, an angle which in general is unknown. However, in the case of CoRoT-3b, the transits reveal the inclination angle and thus the true mass can be determined. In the case of CoRoT-3b, the mass is 21.66 times the mass of the planet Jupiter.

As CoRoT-3b is a transiting object, its radius can be calculated from the amount of light blocked when it passes in front of the star and an estimate of the stellar radius. When CoRoT-3b was originally discovered, it was believed to have a radius significantly smaller than that of Jupiter. This would have implied it had properties intermediate between those of planets and brown dwarfs. Later more detailed analysis revealed that the object's radius is similar to that of Jupiter, which fits with the expected properties of a brown dwarf with the mass of CoRoT-3b.

The mean density of CoRoT-3b is 26,400 kg/m^{3}, greater than that of osmium under standard conditions. This high density is reached because of the extreme compression of matter in the object's interior: in fact, the radius of CoRoT-3b is in agreement with predictions for an object composed mainly of hydrogen. The surface gravity is correspondingly high, over 50 times the gravity felt at the surface of the Earth.

A later study called this density into question using data from Gaia data release 2, arriving at a lower density of 17,300±2,900 kg/m^{3}, but finding the exoplanet KELT-1b to be denser at 23,700±4,000 kg/m^{3}.

A study in 2012, utilizing a Rossiter–McLaughlin effect, determined that the planetary orbit is mildly misaligned with the rotational axis of the star, with the misalignment equal to 37.6^{+10}_{−22.3}°.

== Classification ==
The issue of whether CoRoT-3b is a planet or a brown dwarf depends on the definition chosen for these terms. According to one definition, a brown dwarf is an object capable of fusing deuterium, a process which occurs in objects more massive than 13 times Jupiter's mass. According to this definition, which is the one adopted by the International Astronomical Union's Working Group on Extrasolar Planets, CoRoT-3b is a brown dwarf. However, some models of planet formation predict that planets with masses up to 25–30 Jupiter masses can form via core accretion. If this formation-based distinction between brown dwarfs and planets is used, the status of CoRoT-3b becomes less clear as the method of formation for this object is not known. The issue is clouded further by the orbital properties of the object: brown dwarfs located close to their stars are rare (a phenomenon known as the brown-dwarf desert), while the majority of the known massive close-in planets (for example XO-3b, HAT-P-2b and WASP-14b) are in highly eccentric orbits, in contrast to the circular orbit of CoRoT-3b.
