= Gamma Fornacis =

The Bayer designation Gamma Fornacis (γ For / γ Fornacis) is shared by two stars, in the constellation Fornax:

- γ¹ Fornacis
- γ² Fornacis
