= Rho Fornacis =

Star in the constellation Fornax

ρ Fornacis
- Location of ρ Fornacis (bottom star inside circle)

Observation data Epoch J2000.0 Equinox ICRS
- Constellation: Fornax
- Right ascension: 03^{h} 47^{m} 56.04033^{s}
- Declination: −30° 10′ 4.3781″
- Apparent magnitude (V): +5.452

Characteristics
- Evolutionary stage: red giant branch
- Spectral type: G6III
- U−B color index: +0.66
- B−V color index: +0.98

Astrometry
Radial velocity (R_{v})	51.03±0.12 km/s
Proper motion (μ)	RA: +25.932 mas/yr Dec.: −231.4 mas/yr
Parallax (π)	11.5326±0.0512 mas
Distance	283 ± 1 ly (86.7 ± 0.4 pc)

Details
Mass	1.16±0.10 – 1.24±0.11 M_{☉}
Radius	10.192±0.201 R_{☉}
Luminosity	50.28±1.10 L_{☉}
Surface gravity (log g)	2.43±0.06 cgs
Temperature	4,815±52 K
Metallicity [Fe/H]	−0.34±0.02 dex
Age	3.9±1.0 – 4.67±1.03 Gyr

Other designations
- ρ For, CD−30°1497, FK5 2272, HD 23940, HIP 17738, HR 1184, SAO 194535

Database references
SIMBAD	data

Rho Fornacis (ρ For) is a star of apparent magnitude +5.45 in the constellation of Fornax, the furnace. Its distance from Earth, according to stellar parallax measurements taken by the Gaia spacecraft, is 283 light-years.

Rho Fornacis is a yellow-orange giant of spectral type G6III with an effective temperature of 4,815±4,815 K - similar, though somewhat hotter, than β Fornacis and π Fornacis, stars also in Fornax. The radius of Rho Fornacis is over 10 larger than the solar radius but its mass is only a few percent greater than that of the Sun. Its age is estimated at between three and five billion years.

Rho Fornacis is a thick disk star, unlike most stars in our environment. Arcturus (α Boötis) and ε Fornacis, the latter in this same constellation, are examples of thick disk stars. The eccentricity of its orbit around the Galactic Center (e = 0.56) is considerably greater than that of the Sun (e = 0.16), star of the thin disk. Consequently, it shows a low metallicity—relative abundance of elements heavier than helium—, less than half that of the solar ([Fe/H] = -0.34). Elements such as aluminum, calcium and sodium are equally deficient. As in other similar stars, the oxygen/iron ratio is higher than in the Sun ([O/H] = 0.33).
