= XO-1 =

Star in the constellation Corona Borealis

XO-1 / Moldoveanu
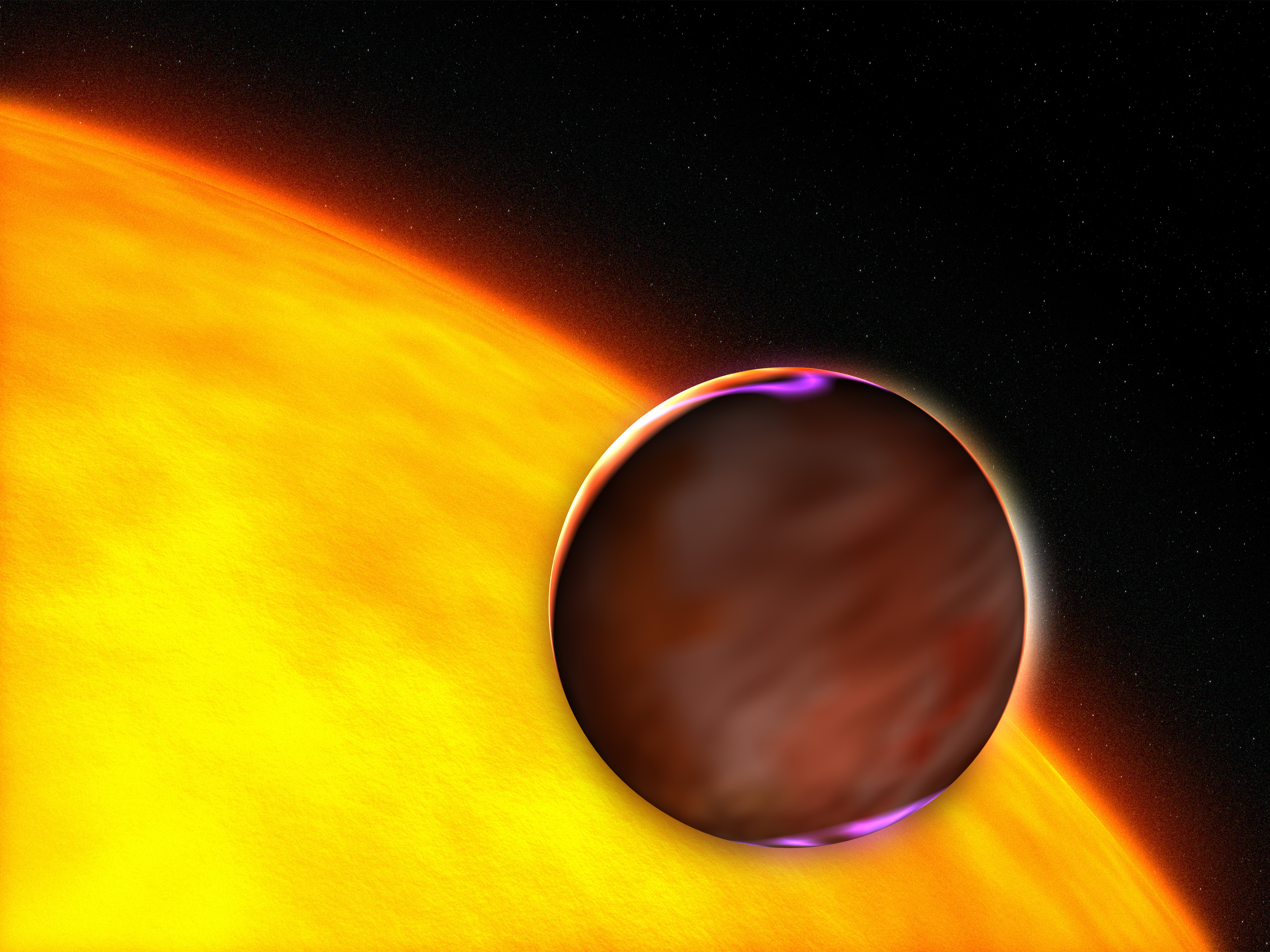
- This artist's impression shows a dramatic close-up of the extrasolar planet XO-1b passing in front of a Sun-like star 600 light-years from Earth. The Jupiter-sized planet is in a tight four-day orbit around the star. Credit: NASA, ESA and G. Bacon (STScI)

Observation data Epoch J2000.0 Equinox ICRS
- Constellation: Corona Borealis
- Right ascension: 16^{h} 02^{m} 11.8462^{s}
- Declination: +28° 10′ 10.420″
- Apparent magnitude (V): 11.19 ± 0.03

Characteristics
- Evolutionary stage: main sequence
- Spectral type: G1V
- Apparent magnitude (B): 11.85 ± 0.04
- Apparent magnitude (V): 11.19 ± 0.03
- Apparent magnitude (J): 9.939 ± 0.022
- Apparent magnitude (H): 9.601 ± 0.017
- Apparent magnitude (K): 9.527 ± 0.015
- Variable type: Planetary transit variable

Astrometry
Radial velocity (R_{v})	2.49±0.32 km/s
Proper motion (μ)	RA: −17.349(12) mas/yr Dec.: 14.780(15) mas/yr
Parallax (π)	6.1489±0.0136 mas
Distance	530 ± 1 ly (162.6 ± 0.4 pc)
Absolute magnitude (M_{V})	5.02^{+0.14}_{−0.16}

Details
Mass	1.027^{+0.057}_{−0.061} M_{☉}
Radius	0.94 ± 0.02 R_{☉}
Luminosity	0.86^{+0.12}_{−0.10} L_{☉}
Surface gravity (log g)	4.50 ± 0.01 cgs
Temperature	5,738 ± 65 K
Metallicity [Fe/H]	−0.06 ± 0.07 dex
Rotational velocity (v sin i)	1.1 ± 1.0 km/s
Age	1.0^{+3.1}_{−0.9} Gyr

Other designations
- Moldoveanu, BD+28 2507, TOI-2021, TIC 236312126, TYC 2041-1657-1, GSC 02041-01657, 2MASS J16021184+2810105

Database references
SIMBAD	data
Exoplanet Archive	data

XO-1 is a magnitude 11 G-type main-sequence star located approximately 530 light-years away in the constellation Corona Borealis. XO-1 has a mass and radius similar to the Sun. In 2006 the extrasolar planet XO-1b was discovered orbiting XO-1 by the transit method using the XO Telescope.

The star XO-1 is named Moldoveanu. The name was selected in the NameExoWorlds campaign by Romania, during the 100th anniversary of the IAU. Moldoveanu is the highest peak in Romania.

== Planetary system ==
The XO Project is an international team of professional and amateur astronomers which discovered the Jupiter-sized planet orbiting around XO-1. The team, led by Peter R. McCullough of the Space Telescope Science Institute in Baltimore, includes four amateur astronomers from North America and Europe. The planet was confirmed using the Harlan J. Smith Telescope and Hobby–Eberly Telescope at McDonald Observatory of the University of Texas. An independent confirmation of the planet was made by the Wide Angle Search for Planets project. In 2019, the planet was named Negoiu, after Negoiu Peak in Romania.

Further observations with the NICMOS instrument on board the Hubble Space Telescope detected the presence of water vapor, methane and carbon dioxide in the atmosphere of XO-1b. However, an independent reinvestigation of the same data was unable to reproduce these results.

The XO-1 planetary system
Companion (in order from star)	Mass	Semimajor axis (AU)	Orbital period (days)	Eccentricity	Inclination (°)	Radius
b / Negoiu	0.907±0.022 M_{J}	0.04914±0.00045	3.94150514(20)	<0.019	88.84±0.22	1.199±0.017 R_{J}

== See also ==
- List of transiting extrasolar planets
