= XO-5b =

Exoplanet in the constellation Lynx

XO-5b / Makropulos
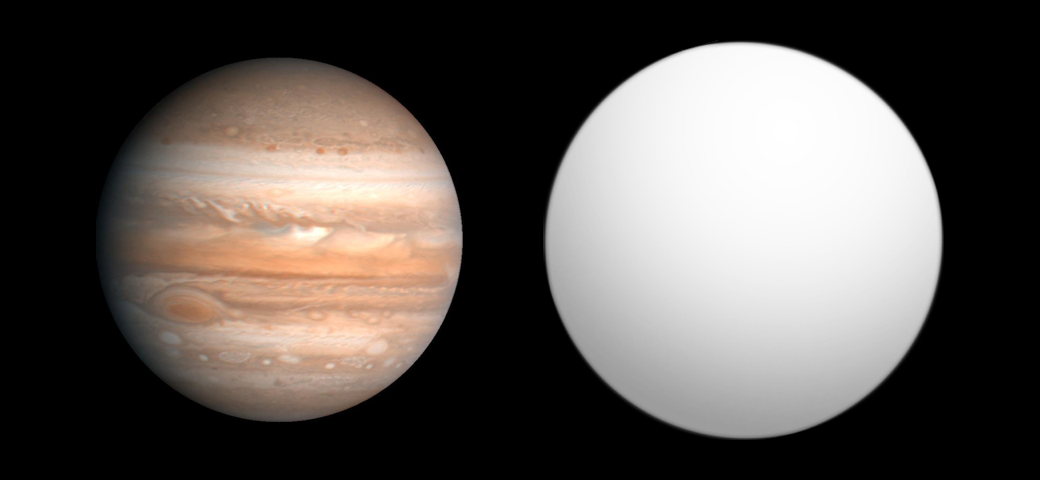
- Size comparison of Jupiter (left) with XO-5b (right).

Discovery
- Discovered by: XO Project
- Discovery site: XO Telescope at Maui, Hawaii
- Discovery date: 2008
- Detection method: Transit

Orbital characteristics
- Semi-major axis: 0.0488 ± 0.0006 AU (7,300,000 ± 90,000 km)
- Eccentricity: 0 (Note: eccentricity is insignificant compared to its uncertainties)
- Orbital period (sidereal): 4.1877545 ± 0.0000016 d
- Inclination: 86.7 ± 0.4
- Semi-amplitude: 144.9 ± 2.0
- Star: XO-5

Physical characteristics
- Mean radius: 1.109 ± 0.050 R_{J}
- Mass: 1.059 ± 0.028 M_{J}
- Mean density: 0.96^{+0.14}_{−0.11} g cm^{−3}
- Surface gravity: 22 ± 5 m/s^{2} (72 ± 16 ft/s^{2})
- Temperature: 1221 ± 27 K

XO-5b, formally named Makropulos, is an extrasolar planet approximately 910 light years away in the constellation of Lynx. This planet was found by the transit method using the XO Telescope and announced in May 2008. It was also independently discovered by the HATNet Project. The planet has a mass and radius just slightly larger than that of Jupiter. This planet orbits very close to the G-type parent star, as it is typical for transiting planets, classing this as Hot Jupiter. It takes only 4.188 days (or 100.5 hours) to orbit at an orbital distance of 0.0488 AU).

The planet XO-5b is named Makropulos. The name was selected in the NameExoWorlds campaign by the Czech Republic, during the 100th anniversary of the IAU. Makropulos is the name from Karel Čapek's play Věc Makropulos (The Makropulos Affair).

== Discovery ==
XO-5b was the fifth hot Jupiter transiting planet discovered by the XO Project and was identified as a possible candidate extrasolar planet from two seasons of observations, November 2003 to March 2004 and November 2004 to March 2005. Follow-up photometry was provided by the extended team, a collaboration of professional and amateur astronomers. The team obtained better-quality light curves to guide the photometric and spectroscopic follow-up necessary to classify a candidate as an actual planetary companion.

To confirm XO-5b's planetary nature radial velocity observations of XO-5 were made with the high-resolution spectrograph on the 11-meter Hobby–Eberly Telescope located at McDonald Observatory, in order to measure the mass of the planet. Commencing on December 7, 2007, a total of ten radial velocity measurements were made which confirmed XO-5b's status as a planet.

== See also ==
- XO Telescope
