= XO-1b =

Extrasolar planet in the constellation Corona Borealis

XO-1b / Negoiu
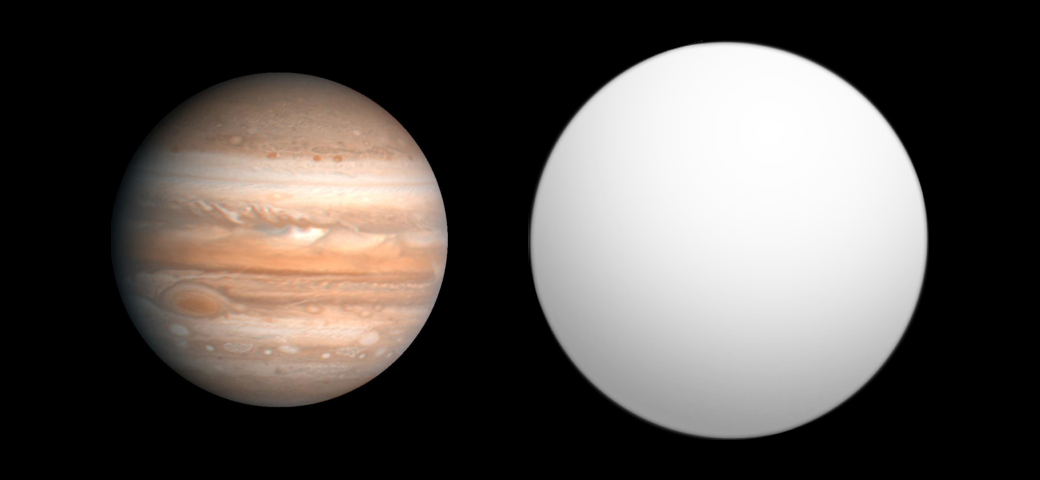
- Size comparison of XO-1b with Jupiter.

Discovery
- Discovered by: Peter R. McCullough et al.
- Discovery site: Haleakala Observatory, Hawaii
- Discovery date: 18 May 2006
- Detection method: Transit and Radial velocity

Orbital characteristics
- Semi-major axis: 0.04914 ^{+0.00045}_{−0.00054} AU
- Eccentricity: <0.019
- Orbital period (sidereal): 3.94150468 ± 0.00000020 d
- Inclination: 88.8°^{+0.07}_{−0.03}
- Time of periastron: 2,455,787.553228±0.000077
- Semi-amplitude: 115.3+1.9 −1.7 m/s
- Star: XO-1

Physical characteristics
- Mean radius: 1.199+0.017 −0.013 R_{J}
- Mass: 0.907+0.022 −0.020 M_{J}
- Mean density: 0.64 ± 0.05 g/cm^{3} (0.0231 ± 0.0018 lb/cu in)
- Surface gravity: 15.8 ± 1.5 m/s^{2} (51.8 ± 4.9 ft/s^{2})

XO-1b is an extrasolar planet approximately 536 light-years away from Earth.

The planet XO-1b is named Negoiu. The name was selected in the NameExoWorlds campaign by Romania, during the 100th anniversary of the IAU. Negoiu is the second highest peak in Romania.

In 2006, the XO Project, an international team of professional and amateur astronomers, discovered a Jupiter-sized planet, later named XO-1b, orbiting a Sun-like star. The team, led by Peter R. McCullough of the Space Telescope Science Institute in Baltimore, had four amateur astronomers hailing from North America and Europe. An independent confirmation of the planet was made by the Wide Angle Search for Planets project later that same year.

The XO Project team employed the relatively inexpensive XO Telescope, made from commercial equipment, to search for extrasolar planets. This telescope is on the Hawaiian Island of Maui.

From September 2003 to September 2005, the XO Telescope detected tens of thousands of bright stars. In that time, McCullough's team of amateur astronomers studied a few dozen stars they had previously identified as promising candidates for extrasolar planets. The star XO-1, in particular, was marked as a promising candidate in June 2005. The amateur astronomers observed it from June to July 2005, eventually confirming that a planet-sized object was eclipsing it. McCullough's team then turned to the McDonald Observatory in Texas for information on the object's mass and to confirm it was a planet.

== Transit ==
McCullough's team found the planet by detecting slight reductions in the star's intensity as the planet moved into transit of the star. The light from the star reduces by approximately two percent when XO-1b is in transit. Their observation revealed that XO-1b is in a tight, four-day orbit around its parent star.

While astronomers had detected more than 180 extrasolar planets, XO-1b is only the tenth planet discovered using the transit method. It is only the second planet found using telephoto lenses. The first, TrES-1, in the constellation Lyra, was reported in 2004. The transit method allows astronomers to determine a planet's size.

Secondary transits and phase curve of this planet have been observed.

== Radial velocity ==
The team confirmed the planet's existence by using the Harlan J. Smith Telescope and the Hobby-Eberly Telescope at the University of Texas's McDonald Observatory to measure slight perturbations induced by the planet on its parent star. The radial velocity method allowed the team to calculate a precise mass of the planet, which is slightly less than Jupiter's. This planet is much larger than its mass would suggest. McCullough has said, "Of the planets that pass in front of their stars, XO-1b is the most similar to Jupiter yet known, and the star XO-1 is the most similar to the Sun, but XO-1b is much, much closer to its star than Jupiter is to the Sun."

The technique used by the team to find XO-1b is an innovative method in that it uses a relatively inexpensive telescope to hunt for extrasolar planets. It, however, is limited primarily to planets orbiting close to their parent stars, and it only finds planets large enough to cause a measurable depression in starlight.

== Physical characteristics ==
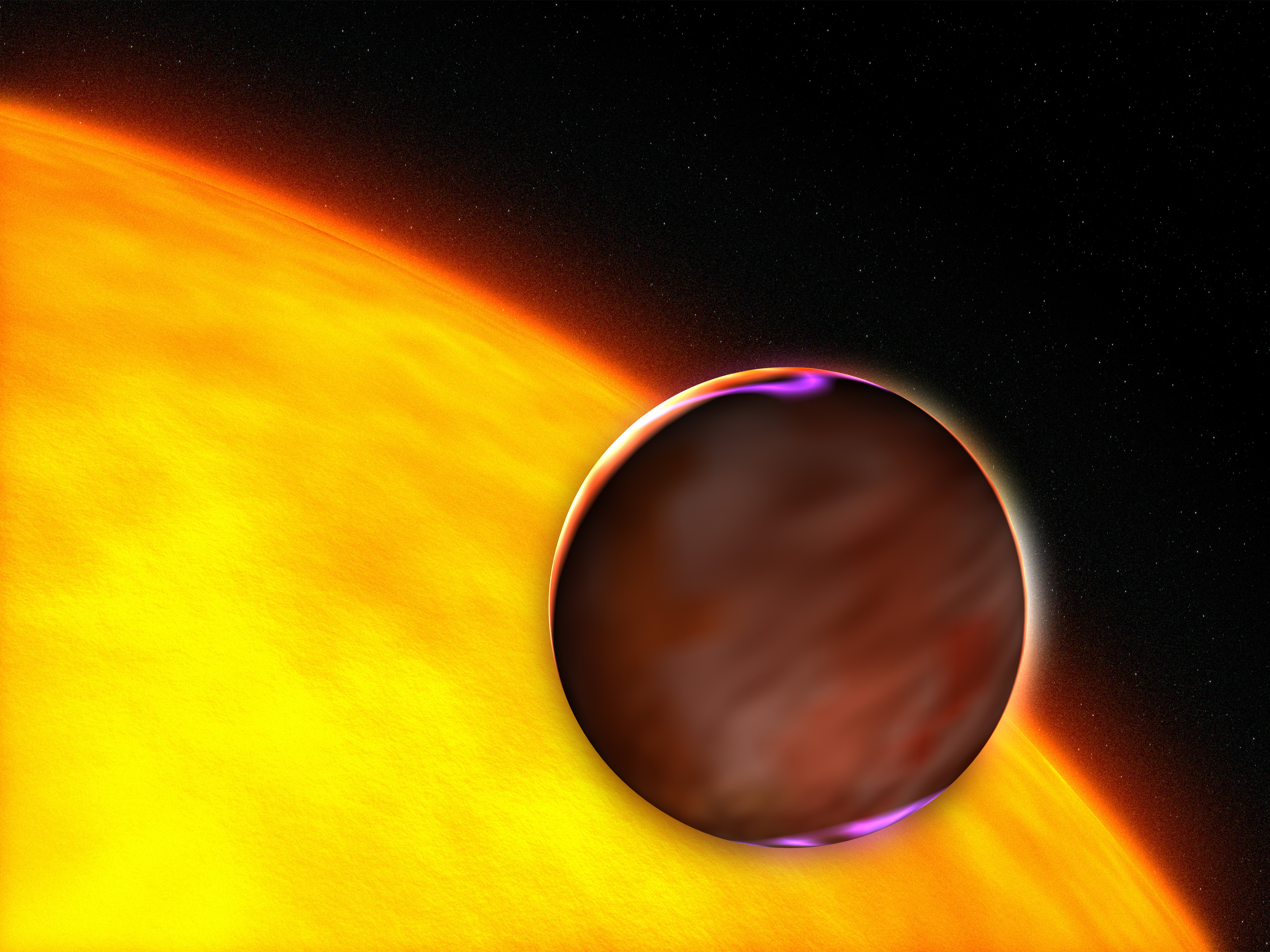
This artist's impression shows a dramatic close-up of the extrasolar planet XO-1b passing in front of a Sun-like star 600 light-years from Earth. The Jupiter-sized planet is in a tight four-day orbit around the star.

As a planet with a mass comparable to that of Jupiter in a close-orbit around its star, this planet falls into the category of hot Jupiters. Like other known transiting hot Jupiters such as HD 209458 b and TrES-1b, the low density of XO-1b indicates that this planet is a gas giant composed mainly of hydrogen and helium.

Observations with the NICMOS instrument on board the Hubble Space Telescope detected the presence of water vapor, methane, carbon dioxide, and possibly carbon monoxide in the atmosphere of XO-1b. However, an independent reinvestigation of the same data was unable to reproduce these results. Later studies by the Hubble Space Telescope detected water in the atmosphere of the exoplanet.

== See also ==
- 51 Pegasi b
- HD 209458 b
- Hot Jupiter
- TrES-1b
