= XO-5 =

Binary star in the constellation Lynx

XO-5/Absolutno
Observation data Epoch J2000 Equinox ICRS
- Constellation: Lynx
- Right ascension: 07^{h} 46^{m} 51.9615^{s}
- Declination: +39° 05′ 40.461″
- Apparent magnitude (V): 12.13±0.03

Characteristics
- Spectral type: G8V + M
- Apparent magnitude (V): 12.13±0.03
- Apparent magnitude (R): 11.844
- Apparent magnitude (J): 10.774±0.019
- Apparent magnitude (H): 10.443±0.021
- Apparent magnitude (K): 10.345±0.018

Astrometry
Radial velocity (R_{v})	−9.47±0.65 km/s
Proper motion (μ)	RA: −21.509(18) mas/yr Dec.: −23.910(13) mas/yr
Parallax (π)	3.6517±0.0173 mas
Distance	893 ± 4 ly (274 ± 1 pc)
Absolute magnitude (M_{V})	5.06±0.12

Details
Mass	1.04±0.03 M_{☉}
Radius	1.13±0.03 R_{☉}
Luminosity	0.88±0.09 L_{☉}
Surface gravity (log g)	4.35±0.02 cgs
Temperature	5430±70 K
Metallicity [Fe/H]	+0.05±0.06 dex
Rotational velocity (v sin i)	0.7±0.5 km/s

Other designations
- Absolutno, TOI-5373, TIC 9155187, GSC 02959-00729, 2MASS J07465196+3905404, UCAC2 45499774

Database references
SIMBAD	data
Exoplanet Archive	data

XO-5, formally named Absolutno, is a likely binary star system, made up of a G-type dwarf and a red dwarf companion, located approximately 893 light-years away from Earth in the constellation Lynx. It has a magnitude of about 12 and cannot be seen with the naked eye but is visible through a small telescope.

XO-5 has a suspected red dwarf companion with a temperature of 3500^{+250}_{−150} K, on a wide orbit. A 2024 study also identified it as a very likely binary star, with 94% probability.

The name Absolutno was selected in the NameExoWorlds campaign by the Czech Republic, during the 100th anniversary of the IAU. Absolutno is a fictional miraculous substance in the Czech sci-fi novel Továrna na absolutno (The Factory for the Absolute).

== Planetary system ==
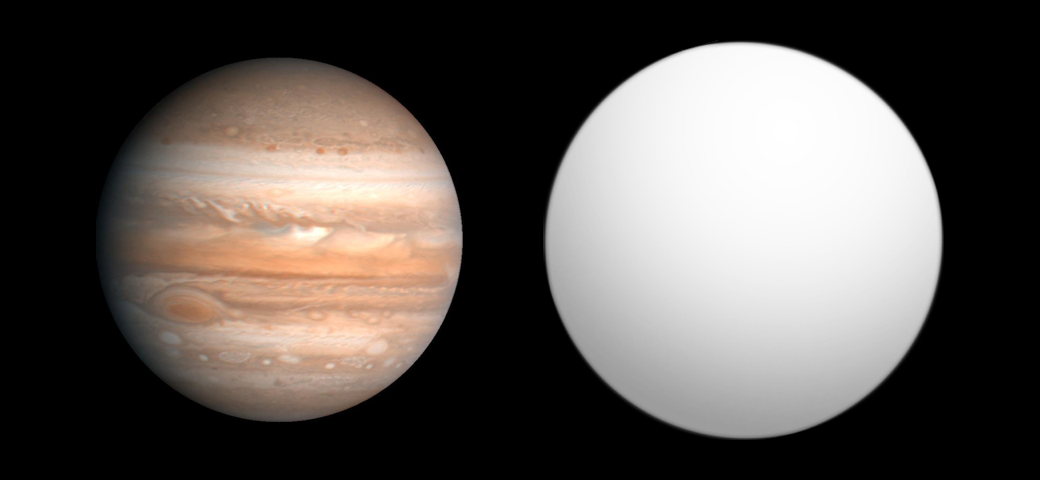
Size comparison of XO-5 b and Jupiter

The exoplanet XO-5b was discovered by the XO Telescope using the transit method in 2008. This planet is classified as a hot Jupiter. A search for transit timing variations caused by additional planets was negative.

The XO-5 planetary system (Note: eccentricity is insignificant compared to its uncertainties)
Companion (in order from star)	Mass	Semimajor axis (AU)	Orbital period (days)	Eccentricity	Inclination (°)	Radius
b / Makropulos	1.19±0.03 M_{J}	0.0515±0.0005	4.1877558(6)	0	86.8±0.2	1.14±0.03 R_{J}
