= HD 20781 d =

Extrasolar planet orbiting HD 20781 in the constellation Fornax

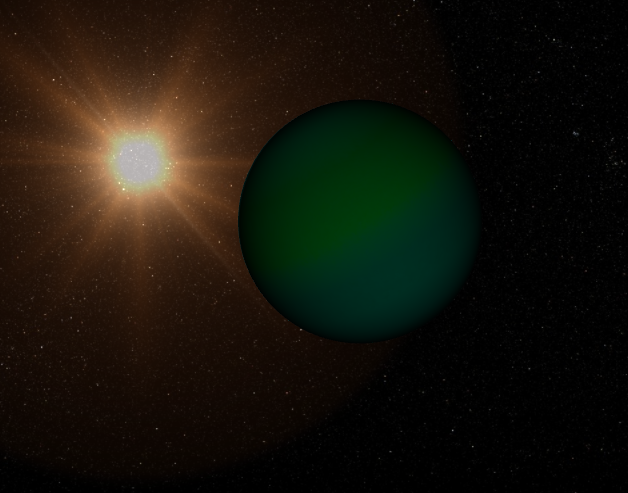
- An artist's impression of HD 20781 d orbiting its host star.

Discovery
- Discovered by: Mayor et al.
- Discovery site: La Silla Observatory
- Discovery date: 2011
- Detection method: Doppler spectroscopy (HARPS)

Orbital characteristics
- Periastron: 0.15 AU
- Apoastron: 0.18 AU
- Semi-major axis: 0.1647+0.0076 −0.0083 AU
- Eccentricity: 0.11+0.05 −0.06
- Orbital period (sidereal): 29.1580+0.0102 −0.0100 d
- Time of periastron: 2,455,511.3258+2.4394 −2.4382 JD
- Argument of periastron: 60.99°+30.79° −30.03°
- Semi-amplitude: 2.82+0.17 −0.16 m/s

Physical characteristics
- Mean radius: ~3.18 R_{🜨} (estimate)
- Mass: ≥10.61+1.20 −1.19 M_{🜨}

HD 20781 d is an extrasolar planet orbiting the K-type main-sequence star HD 20781 117 light years away in the southern constellation Fornax. It was discovered in 2011 during a survey for southern exoplanets conducted with HARPS using doppler spectroscopy, the radial velocity variations caused by the gravitational pull of the planet. Its existence was confirmed in another survey during 2017.

== Naming ==
This planet was initially reported in a 2011 preprint, which referred to it as HD 20781 b. However, the 2017 paper (published in a journal in 2019) that confirmed the planet designated it HD 20781 d, using the b designation for a different, shorter-period planet.

== Properties ==
=== Orbit ===
HD 20781 d takes only 29 days to orbit its host star, classifying it as a hot Neptune. However, its orbit is slightly eccentric, carrying it as close as 0.15 AU and as far as 0.18 AU. HD 20781 d is the second outermost planet in its system after HD 20781 e.

=== Characteristics ===
With a minimum mass 10.6 times that of Earth, it is probably a sub-Neptune, a planet that is larger than Earth but smaller than Neptune. Due to indirect detection, most of its properties can't be studied such as inclination, density, and temperature. Due to HD 20781 d's mass, it is estimated to be about 3 times larger than Earth.
