= XO-4 =

Star in the constellation Lynx

XO-4 / Koit
Observation data Epoch J2000 Equinox ICRS
- Constellation: Lynx
- Right ascension: 07^{h} 21^{m} 33.1602^{s}
- Declination: +58° 16′ 05.110″
- Apparent magnitude (V): 10.674 ± 0.019

Characteristics
- Evolutionary stage: main sequence
- Spectral type: F5V
- Apparent magnitude (B): 11.240 ± 0.029
- Apparent magnitude (V): 10.674 ± 0.019
- Apparent magnitude (J): 9.667 ± 0.021
- Apparent magnitude (H): 9.476 ± 0.022
- Apparent magnitude (K): 9.406 ± 0.023

Astrometry
Radial velocity (R_{v})	1.74±0.33 km/s
Proper motion (μ)	RA: −17.008(12) mas/yr Dec.: 5.463(12) mas/yr
Parallax (π)	3.7812±0.0156 mas
Distance	863 ± 4 ly (264 ± 1 pc)

Details
Mass	1.32±0.02 M_{☉}
Radius	1.56±0.05 R_{☉}
Surface gravity (log g)	4.18±0.07 cgs
Temperature	6397±70 K
Metallicity [Fe/H]	−0.04±0.03 dex
Rotational velocity (v sin i)	8.8±0.5 km/s
Age	2.1±0.6 Gyr

Other designations
- Koit, TOI-1721, TIC 51234631, TYC 3793-1994-1, GSC 03793-01994, 2MASS J07213317+5816051

Database references
SIMBAD	data
Exoplanet Archive	data

XO-4 is a star located approximately 863 light-years away from Earth in the constellation Lynx. It has a magnitude of about 11 and cannot be seen with the naked eye but is visible through a small telescope. A search for a binary companion star using adaptive optics at MMT Observatory was negative.

The star XO-4 is named Koit. The name was selected in the NameExoWorlds campaign by Estonia, during the 100th anniversary of the IAU. Koit is Estonian for dawn, and was named for a character in a folk tale written by Friedrich Robert Faehlmann.

== Planetary system ==
One known exoplanet, XO-4b, which is classified as a hot Jupiter, orbits XO-4. This exoplanet was discovered in 2008 by the XO Project using the transit method. It has been named Hämarik, meaning dusk, and referring to a character from the same Faehlmann story featuring Koit. The planetary orbit is misaligned with the stellar rotation.

The XO-4 planetary system (Note: eccentricity approximately equal to zero is expected theoretically and is consistent with the radial velocities and secondary eclipse timing)
Companion (in order from star)	Mass	Semimajor axis (AU)	Orbital period (days)	Eccentricity	Inclination (°)	Radius
b / Hämarik	1.612+0.027 −0.028 M_{J}	0.05524+0.00027 −0.00028	4.1250823(39)	<0.0039	88.7±1.1	1.34±0.05 R_{J}
