= CoRoT-3 =

Star in the constellation of Aquila

Observation data Epoch J2000.0 Equinox ICRS
- Constellation: Aquila
- Right ascension: 19^{h} 28^{m} 13.2642^{s}
- Declination: +00° 07′ 18.614″
- Apparent magnitude (V): 13.3

Characteristics
- Evolutionary stage: main sequence
- Spectral type: F3V
- Apparent magnitude (B): 13.85 ±0.44
- Apparent magnitude (I): 12.54 ±0.04
- Apparent magnitude (J): 11.94 ±0.03
- Apparent magnitude (H): 11.71 ±0.04
- Apparent magnitude (K): 11.62 ±0.03

Astrometry
Proper motion (μ)	RA: +3.528±0018 mas/yr Dec.: −0.308±0.014 mas/yr
Parallax (π)	1.3118±0.0177 mas
Distance	2,490 ± 30 ly (760 ± 10 pc)

Other designations
- GSC 00465-01645, DENIS-P J192813.2+000718, 2MASS J19281326+0007185, USNO-A2.0 0900-15209129, CoRoT-Exo-3, GSC2.3 N1MO000645, UCAC2 31931545, USNO-B1.0 0901-00488457

Database references
SIMBAD	data

CoRoT-3 is a white-yellow dwarf main sequence star hotter than the Sun. This star is located approximately 2560 light-years away in the constellation of Aquila. The apparent magnitude of this star is 13, which means it is not visible to the naked eye but can be seen with a medium-sized amateur telescope on a clear dark night.

== Planetary system ==
This star is home to object designated CoRoT-3b. This object was discovered by the CoRoT Mission spacecraft using the transit method. Measurements made using the radial velocity method show that this object is probably a brown dwarf.

The CoRoT-3 planetary system
Companion (in order from star)	Mass	Semimajor axis (AU)	Orbital period (days)	Eccentricity	Inclination (°)	Radius
b	21.66 ±1 M_{J}	0.057 ±0.003	4.2568 ±5e-06	0	85.9 ± 0.8	1.01 ± 0.07 R_{J}

== See also ==
- List of extrasolar planets
