= XO-2 =

Binary star system in the constellation Lynx

Observation data Epoch J2000 Equinox ICRS
- Constellation: Lynx
- XO-2S
- Right ascension: 07^{h} 48^{m} 07.4814^{s}
- Declination: +50° 13′ 03.255″
- Apparent magnitude (V): 11.12±0.03
- XO-2N
- Right ascension: 07^{h} 48^{m} 06.4723^{s}
- Declination: +50° 13′ 32.921″
- Apparent magnitude (V): 11.18±0.03

Characteristics
- Spectral type: K0V + K0V

Astrometry

XO-2S
Radial velocity (R_{v})	46.94±0.27 km/s
Proper motion (μ)	RA: −29.308(15) mas/yr Dec.: −154.233(13) mas/yr
Parallax (π)	6.6721±0.0151 mas
Distance	489 ± 1 ly (149.9 ± 0.3 pc)
Absolute magnitude (M_{V})	5.74

XO-2N
Radial velocity (R_{v})	47.45±0.44 km/s
Proper motion (μ)	RA: −29.552(15) mas/yr Dec.: −154.227(11) mas/yr
Parallax (π)	6.6588±0.0158 mas
Distance	490 ± 1 ly (150.2 ± 0.4 pc)
Absolute magnitude (M_{V})	5.74

Details

XO-2S
Mass	0.9624±0.0073 M_{☉}
Radius	1.011±0.019 R_{☉}
Luminosity	0.79±0.14 L_{☉}
Surface gravity (log g)	4.420±0.094 cgs
Temperature	5,325±37 K
Metallicity [Fe/H]	0.32±0.08 dex
Rotation	26.0±0.6 d
Rotational velocity (v sin i)	1.5±0.3 km/s
Age	7.1+2.5 −2.9 Gyr

XO-2N
Mass	0.96±0.05 M_{☉}
Radius	0.998+0.033 −0.032 R_{☉}
Luminosity	0.70±0.04 L_{☉}
Surface gravity (log g)	4.43±0.10 cgs
Temperature	5,290±18 K
Metallicity [Fe/H]	0.37±0.07 dex
Rotation	41.6±1.1 d
Rotational velocity (v sin i)	1.07±0.09 km/s
Age	7.8+1.2 −1.3 Gyr

Other designations
- XO-2S: LSPM J0748+5013S, TYC 3413-210-1, GSC 03413-00210, 2MASS J07480748+5013032
- XO-2N: BD+50 1471, LSPM J0748+5013N, TOI-1720, TIC 356473034, TYC 3413-5-1, GSC 03413-00005, 2MASS J07480647+5013328

Database references
SIMBAD	XO-2S
- XO-2N
Exoplanet Archive	data

XO-2 is a binary star system about 490 light-years (150 parsecs) away in the constellation Lynx. It consists of two components, XO-2N and XO-2S, both of which host planetary systems.

== Star system ==
This system is unusual in that the stars are not typically referred to as components A & B, but are designated based on their positions in the sky: XO-2N is the northern star and XO-2S is the southern star.

Both of the stars are slightly cooler than the Sun and are nearly identical to each other. The system has a magnitude of 11 and cannot be seen with the naked eye but is visible through a small telescope. These stars are also notable for their large proper motions.

XO-2N and XO-2S have a separation of approximately 4,600 AU.

== Planetary systems ==
Two planets were reported to orbit around XO-2S in 2014 using the radial velocity method. One of them is Jupiter-mass and another has a mass comparable to Saturn. A 2024 study found evidence for a third, super-Jupiter mass planet around XO-2S.

The XO-2S planetary system
Companion (in order from star)	Mass	Semimajor axis (AU)	Orbital period (days)	Eccentricity	Inclination (°)	Radius
b	≥0.26±0.01 M_{J}	0.1347±0.0025	18.220±0.001	0.15±0.02	—	—
c	≥1.38±0.05 M_{J}	0.4737+0.0085 −0.0088	120.059±0.013	0.149±0.006	—	—
d	≥3.71+1.2 −0.51 M_{J}	5.46+0.85 −0.40	4,696+1,133 −489	0.091+0.028 −0.018	—	—

There is one confirmed exoplanet orbiting XO-2N. XO-2Nb, which is classified as a hot Jupiter, was discovered by the XO Telescope using the transit method around XO-2N in 2007. It was initially the only known planet in the system and was referred to as XO-2b. A long-period variation in the radial velocity of XO-2N was detected in 2015, which could be explained by either a second planet or a stellar activity cycle. The stellar activity explanation is considered more likely, and is further supported by a 2024 study.

The XO-2N planetary system (Note: Mass and eccentricity: Damasso et al. 2015 Other properties: Wang et al. (2025))
Companion (in order from star)	Mass	Semimajor axis (AU)	Orbital period (days)	Eccentricity	Inclination (°)	Radius
b	0.597±0.021 M_{J}	0.03668(9)	2.615859719(54)	<0.006	87.47±0.37	1.033±0.023 R_{J}

== See also ==
Other systems with multiple planet-hosting stars:

- 55 Cancri
- HD 20781 & HD 20782
- HD 133131
- WASP-94
- Struve 2398
