= XO-3 =

Star in the constellation Camelopardalis

Observation data Epoch J2000 Equinox ICRS
- Constellation: Camelopardalis
- Right ascension: 04^{h} 21^{m} 52.7048^{s}
- Declination: +57° 49′ 01.889″
- Apparent magnitude (V): 9.80 ± 0.03

Characteristics
- Evolutionary stage: main sequence
- Spectral type: F5V
- Apparent magnitude (B): 10.25 ± 0.03
- Apparent magnitude (V): 9.80 ± 0.03
- Apparent magnitude (J): 9.013 ± 0.029
- Apparent magnitude (H): 8.845 ± 0.018
- Apparent magnitude (K): 8.791 ± 0.019

Astrometry
Radial velocity (R_{v})	−11.14±0.47 km/s
Proper motion (μ)	RA: −2.721(27) mas/yr Dec.: 4.186(23) mas/yr
Parallax (π)	4.8687±0.0261 mas
Distance	670 ± 4 ly (205 ± 1 pc)

Details
Mass	1.449+0.056 −0.058 M_{☉}
Radius	1.523±0.027 R_{☉}
Luminosity	4.92+0.40 −0.34 L_{☉}
Surface gravity (log g)	4.234+0.013 −0.014 cgs
Temperature	6970+110 −100 K
Metallicity [Fe/H]	−0.159+0.058 −0.069 dex
Rotational velocity (v sin i)	18.63±0.24 km/s
Age	0.97+0.36 −0.29 Gyr

Other designations
- XO-3, BD+57 793, TOI-1676, TIC 8400842, TYC 3727-1064-1, GSC 03727-01064, 2MASS J04215269+5749018

Database references
SIMBAD	data
Exoplanet Archive	data

XO-3 is a star 670 light-years (210 parsecs) away in the constellation Camelopardalis. The star has a magnitude of 10 and is not visible to the naked eye but is visible through a small telescope. A search for a binary companion star using adaptive optics at the MMT Observatory was negative.

== Planetary system ==
In 2007, the gas giant exoplanet XO-3b was discovered by the XO Telescope using the transit method. This object may be classified as a brown dwarf because of its high mass, near the ~13 M_{J} limit for deuterium fusion. The planetary orbit is misaligned with the stellar rotation, which is unusual for such a massive planet. The misalignment may be due to an undetected companion star.

The XO-3 planetary system
Companion (in order from star)	Mass	Semimajor axis (AU)	Orbital period (days)	Eccentricity	Inclination (°)	Radius
b	13.27+0.35 −0.36 M_{J}	0.04815+0.00061 −0.00065	3.19152309(14)	0.2791+0.0024 −0.0022	83.66±0.17	1.320±0.025 R_{J}
