= XO-2Nb =

Hot Jupiter

XO-2Nb (XO-2Bb)
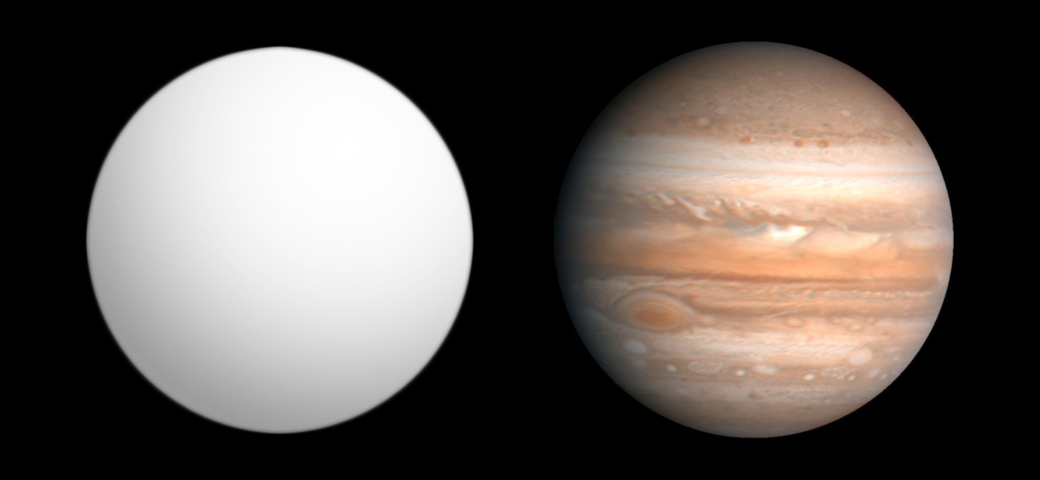
- Size comparison of XO-2 b (gray) with Jupiter.

Discovery
- Discovered by: Burke et al.
- Discovery date: 2007
- Detection method: Transit (including secondary eclipse)

Orbital characteristics
- Semi-major axis: 0.0369 ± 0.002 AU (5,520,000 ± 300,000 km)
- Eccentricity: 0
- Orbital period (sidereal): 2.61586178 ± 0.00000075 d
- Inclination: 87.62 ± 0.51
- Time of periastron: 2454147.74902 ± 0.00002
- Argument of periastron: ?
- Semi-amplitude: 80.2
- Star: XO-2N (XO-2B)

Physical characteristics
- Mean radius: 0.973 ± 0.03 R_{J}
- Mass: 0.57 ± 0.06 M_{J}
- Mean density: 0.82 g/cm^{3}
- Surface gravity: 1.42 m/s^{2} (0.145 g_{0})
- Temperature: 1,208 K (935 °C)

XO-2Nb (or rarely XO-2Bb) is an extrasolar planet orbiting the star XO-2N, the fainter component of XO-2 wide binary star in the constellation Lynx. This planet was found by the transit method in 2007 by Burke et al. This was the second such planet found by the XO telescope.

The radial velocity of XO-2 over time, caused by the presence of XO-2 b.

Like most planets found by the transit method, it is a roughly Jupiter sized planet that orbits very close to its host star; in this case, it has a surface temperature of about 1200 K, so it belongs to a group of exoplanets known as hot Jupiters. The planet takes 2.6 days to orbit the star at the average distance of 0.0369 AU. The planet has mass of 57% of Jupiter and radius of 97% of Jupiter. The radius is relatively large for its mass, probably due to its intense heating from its nearby star that bloats the planet's atmosphere. The large radius for its mass gives a low density of 820 kg/m^{3}.

== See also ==
- XO Telescope
