= OGLE-2015-BLG-1319 =

Brown dwarf

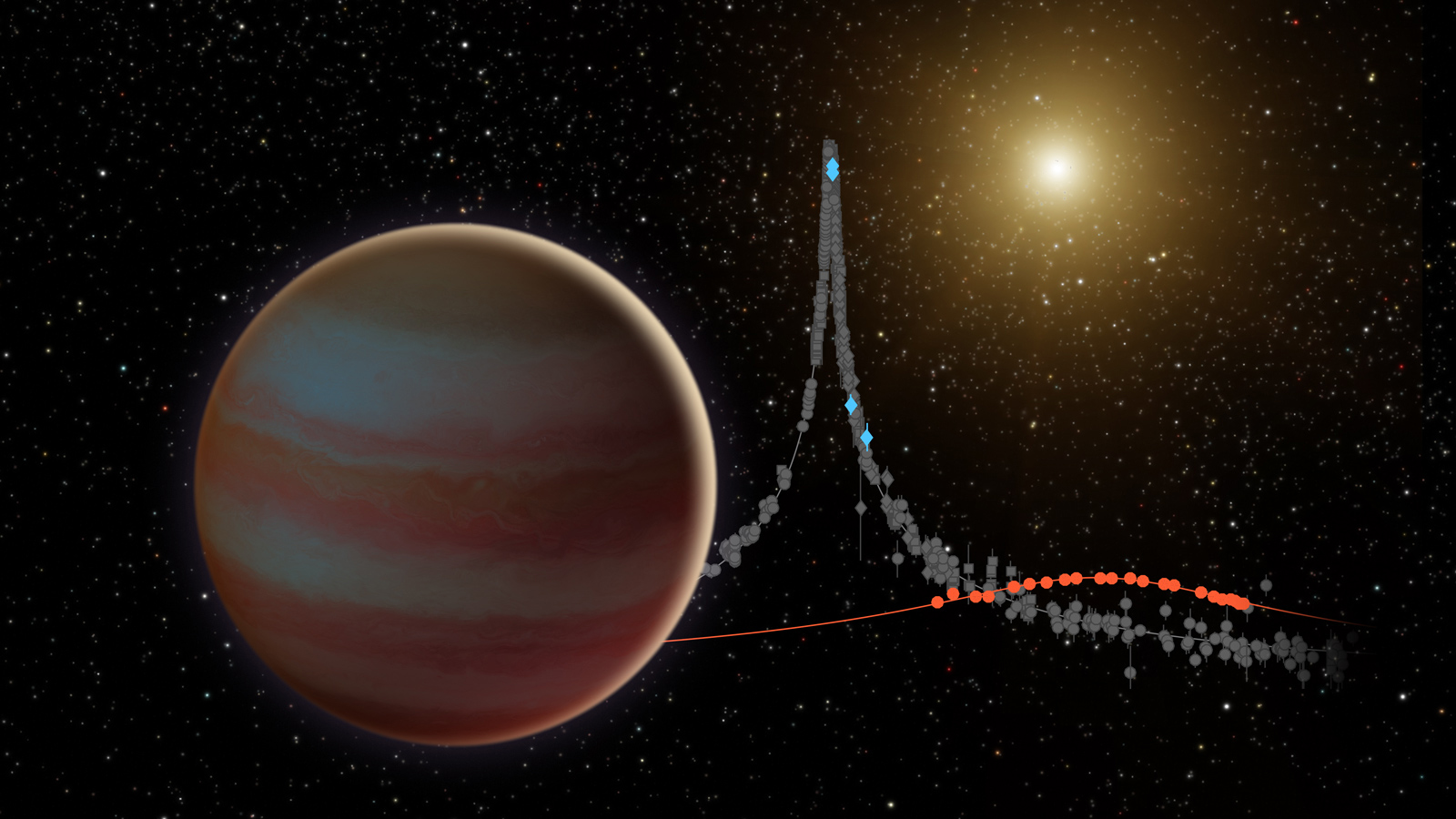
- Artist’s impression of OGLE-2015-BLG-1319

Discovery
- Discovered by: Spitzer Space Telescope, Swift, Optical Gravitational Lensing Experiment
- Discovery date: June/July, 2015
- Detection method: Microlensing

Orbital characteristics
- Semi-major axis: ~0.25 or ~45 AU
- Star: OGLE-2015-BLG-1319L

OGLE-2015-BLG-1319 is a binary system comprising a brown dwarf that orbits a K-type star, located 16,307 light years away from the Solar System.

== Discovery ==
It was discovered during June–July 2015 using the gravitational microlensing detection method through the joint effort between Swift, Spitzer Space Telescope, and the ground-based Optical Gravitational Lensing Experiment, the first time two space telescopes have observed the same microlensing event. This method was possible because of the large separation between the two spacecraft: Swift is in low Earth orbit while Spitzer is more than one AU distant in an Earth-trailing heliocentric orbit. This separation provided significantly different perspectives of the brown dwarf, allowing for constraints to be placed on some of the object's physical characteristics.

== Orbit ==
The brown dwarf, OGLE-2015-BLG-1319Lb, may be unusually close to its host star. It orbits at a distance of either 0.25 AU or 45 AU. If the former is correct, it would sit within the brown dwarf desert; only around 1% of all Sun-like stars have brown dwarfs closer than 3 AU.

== Host star ==
The host star, OGLE-2015-BLG-1319L, is a K-type star. With an apparent magnitude of 22.0, it is only visible though strong telescopes, and is only 0.58 M☉.
