= XO-4b =

Exoplanet in the constellation of Lynx

XO-4b Hämarik
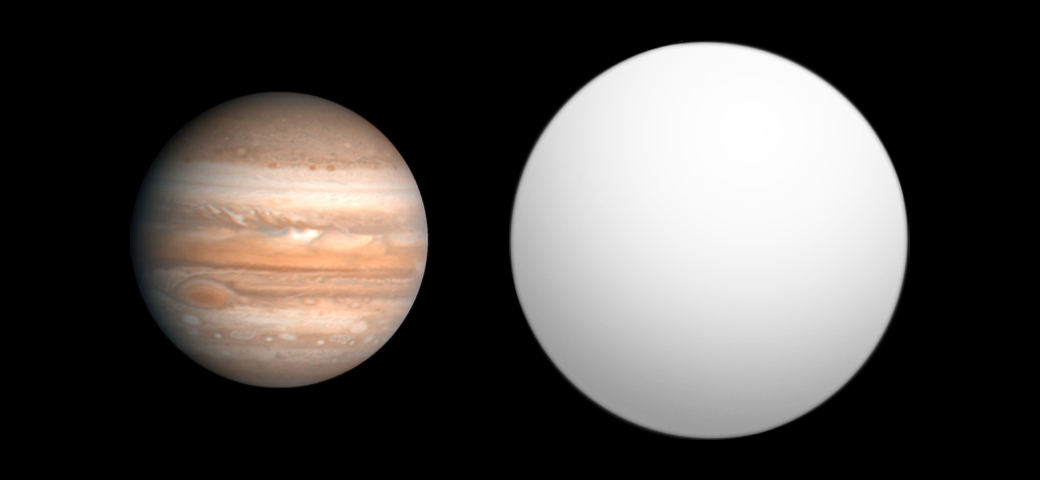
- Size comparison of XO-4b with Jupiter.

Discovery
- Discovered by: McCullough et al.
- Discovery site: Maui, Hawaii
- Discovery date: May 19, 2008
- Detection method: Transit

Orbital characteristics
- Semi-major axis: 0.0555 ± 0.00011 AU (8,303,000 ± 16,000 km)
- Eccentricity: 0.0024
- Orbital period (sidereal): 4.12502 ± 2e-5 d 0.011293 y
- Inclination: 88.7 ± 1.1
- Star: XO-4

Physical characteristics
- Mean radius: 1.34 ± 0.048 R_{J}
- Mass: 1.72 ± 0.2 M_{J}
- Mean density: 0.948 g/cm^{3}
- Surface gravity: 24.8 m/s^{2} (2.53 g_{0})
- Temperature: ~1333

XO-4b is an extrasolar planet approximately 956 light years away in the constellation of Lynx. This planet was found by the transit method by McCullough in May 2008. The planet has mass 1.72 M_{J} and radius 1.34 R_{J}. This planet orbits very close to the F-type parent star, as it is typical for transiting planets, classing this planet as Hot Jupiter.

== Orbit ==
It takes only 4.125 days (or 99 hours) to orbit at a distance of 8.3 gigameters (0.0555 AU) away from the star.

The study in 2012, utilizing a Rossiter–McLaughlin effect, have determined the planetary orbit is strongly misaligned with the equatorial plane of the star, misalignment equal to -46.7±8.1°.

== Naming ==
The planet XO-4b is named Hämarik. The name was selected in the NameExoWorlds campaign by Estonia, during the 100th anniversary of the IAU. Hämarik is Estonian for dusk, and was named for a character in a folk tale written by Friedrich Robert Faehlmann, alongside its host star XO-4, named Koit (dawn).

== See also ==
- XO Telescope
