= XO Project =

International team of astronomers

The XO Project is an international team of amateur and professional astronomers tasked with identifying extrasolar planets. They are led by Peter R. McCullough of the Space Telescope Science Institute. It is primarily funded by NASA's Origins Program and the Director's Discretionary Fund of the Space Telescope Science Institute.

== Duties ==
Preliminary identification of possible star candidates starts at the Haleakala telescope in Hawaii by a team of professional astronomers. Once they identify a star that dims slightly from time to time (the transit method), the information is forwarded to a team of amateur astronomers who then investigate for additional evidence suggesting this dimming is caused by a transiting planet. Once enough data is collected, it is forwarded to the University of Texas McDonald Observatory to confirm the presence of a transiting planet by a second team of professional astronomers.

== Equipment ==
McCullough and his team employed a relatively inexpensive telescope called the XO Telescope, made from commercial equipment, to search for extrasolar planets. The construction of the one-of-a-kind telescope cost $60,000 for the hardware, and much more than that for the associated software. The telescope consists of two 200-millimeter telephoto camera lenses, and resembles binoculars in shape. It is similar to the TrES survey telescope. It stands on the summit of the Haleakalā volcano and 3,054 m (10,000 foot) in Hawaii. Their first discovery of a Jupiter-sized planet orbiting a Sun-like star 600 light-years from Earth in the constellation Corona Borealis—XO-1b—was reported May 16, 2006 on Newswise.

In 2016 three similar double telescopes were operating, two in Spain and one in Utah.

== Discoveries ==
The XO telescope has discovered six objects so far, five are hot Jupiter planets and one, XO-3b, may be a brown dwarf.

Star	Constellation	Right ascension	Declination	App. mag.	Distance (ly)	Spectral type	Planet	Mass (M_{J})	Radius (R_{J})	Orbital period (d)	Semimajor axis (AU)	Orbital eccentricity	Inclination (°)	Discovery year
Moldoveanu	Corona Borealis	16^{h} 02^{m} 12^{s}	+28° 10′ 11″	11.319	600	G1V	Negoiu	0.9	1.3	3.941534	0.0488	0	87.7	2006
XO-2N	Lynx	07^{h} 48^{m} 07^{s}	+50° 13′ 33″	11.25	486	K0V	XO-2Nb	0.57	0.973	2.615838	0.0369	0	88.58	2007
XO-3	Camelopardalis	04^{h} 21^{m} 53^{s}	+57° 49′ 01″	9.91	850	F5V	XO-3b	11.79	1.217	3.1915239	0.0454	0.26	84.2	2007
Koit	Lynx	07^{h} 21^{m} 33.1657^{s}	+58° 16′ 05.005″	10.78	956	F5V	Hämarik	1.72	1.34	4.12502	0.0555	0.0024	88.7	2008
Absolutno	Lynx	07^{h} 46^{m} 51.959^{s}	+39° 05′ 40.47″	12.1	881	G8V	Makropulos	1.15	1.15	4.187732	0.0508	0.0029	86.8	2008
XO-6	Camelopardalis	6^{h} 19^{m} 10.31^{s}	+73° 49′ 39.24″	10.28	760	F5V	XO-6b	4.4	2.07	3.76	0.082	0	86.0	2016
XO-7	Draco	18^{h} 29^{m} 52.30^{s}	85° 13′ 59.58″	10.52	763	G0V	XO-7b	0.71	1.373	2.8641424	0.04421	0.038	83.45	2019

== See also ==
- List of extrasolar planets

A subset of XO light curves are available at the NASA Exoplanet Archive.

=== Other Ground-Based Transit Surveys ===
- Next-Generation Transit Survey
- Trans-Atlantic Exoplanet Survey or TrES
- HATNet Project or HAT
- Kilodegree Extremely Little Telescope or KELT
- SuperWASP or WASP
