= Zeta Fornacis =

Star in the constellation Fornax

Observation data Epoch J2000.0 Equinox J2000.0 (ICRS)
- Constellation: Fornax
- Right ascension: 02^{h} 59^{m} 36.18299^{s}
- Declination: −25° 16′ 26.8853″
- Apparent magnitude (V): 5.67

Characteristics
- Spectral type: F4 V
- U−B color index: +0.01
- B−V color index: +0.39

Astrometry
Radial velocity (R_{v})	+29.09±0.63 km/s
Proper motion (μ)	RA: +181.005 mas/yr Dec.: +84.641 mas/yr
Parallax (π)	29.8975±0.0856 mas
Distance	109.1 ± 0.3 ly (33.45 ± 0.10 pc)
Absolute magnitude (M_{V})	+3.14

Details
Mass	1.8 M_{☉}
Radius	1.62+0.02 −0.03 R_{☉}
Luminosity	4.77±0.02 L_{☉}
Surface gravity (log g)	4.16±0.14 cgs
Temperature	6,699+65 −39 K
Metallicity [Fe/H]	+0.02 dex
Rotational velocity (v sin i)	84.9±4.2 km/s
Age	1.5 Gyr

Other designations
- ζ For, CD−25°1191, HD 18692, HIP 13942, HR 901, SAO 168209

Database references
SIMBAD	data

ζ Fornacis (often Latinised as Zeta Fornacis) is the Bayer designation for a star in the southern constellation of Fornax. It is faintly visible to the naked eye with an apparent visual magnitude of 5.67. Based upon a measured annual parallax shift of 29.9 mas, it is located at a distance of about 109 light-years from the Sun. The star is drifting further away with a radial velocity of +29 km/s. Positioned about 1.3° to the southeast of Zeta Fornacis is the galaxy NGC 1232.

This is an F-type main-sequence star with a stellar classification of F4 V. With an estimated age of 1.5 billion years, it has 1.8 times the mass of the Sun and 1.6 times the Sun's radius. The star is radiating 4.77 times the luminosity of the Sun from its photosphere at an effective temperature of 6,699 K. It is spinning with a projected rotational velocity of 84.9 km/s, and has a near-solar metallicity—what astronomers term the abundance of elements other than hydrogen and helium. This star is a probable member of the Hyades Stream—a group of stars that share a common motion through space with the Hyades cluster.

Zeta Fornacis has a common proper motion companion, NLTT 9563, a magnitude 13.50 star with a classification of M 2.5. As of 2004, this companion was positioned at an angular separation of 176.1 arcseconds along a position angle of 288.1°.
