= TZ Fornacis =

Binary star in the constellation Fornax

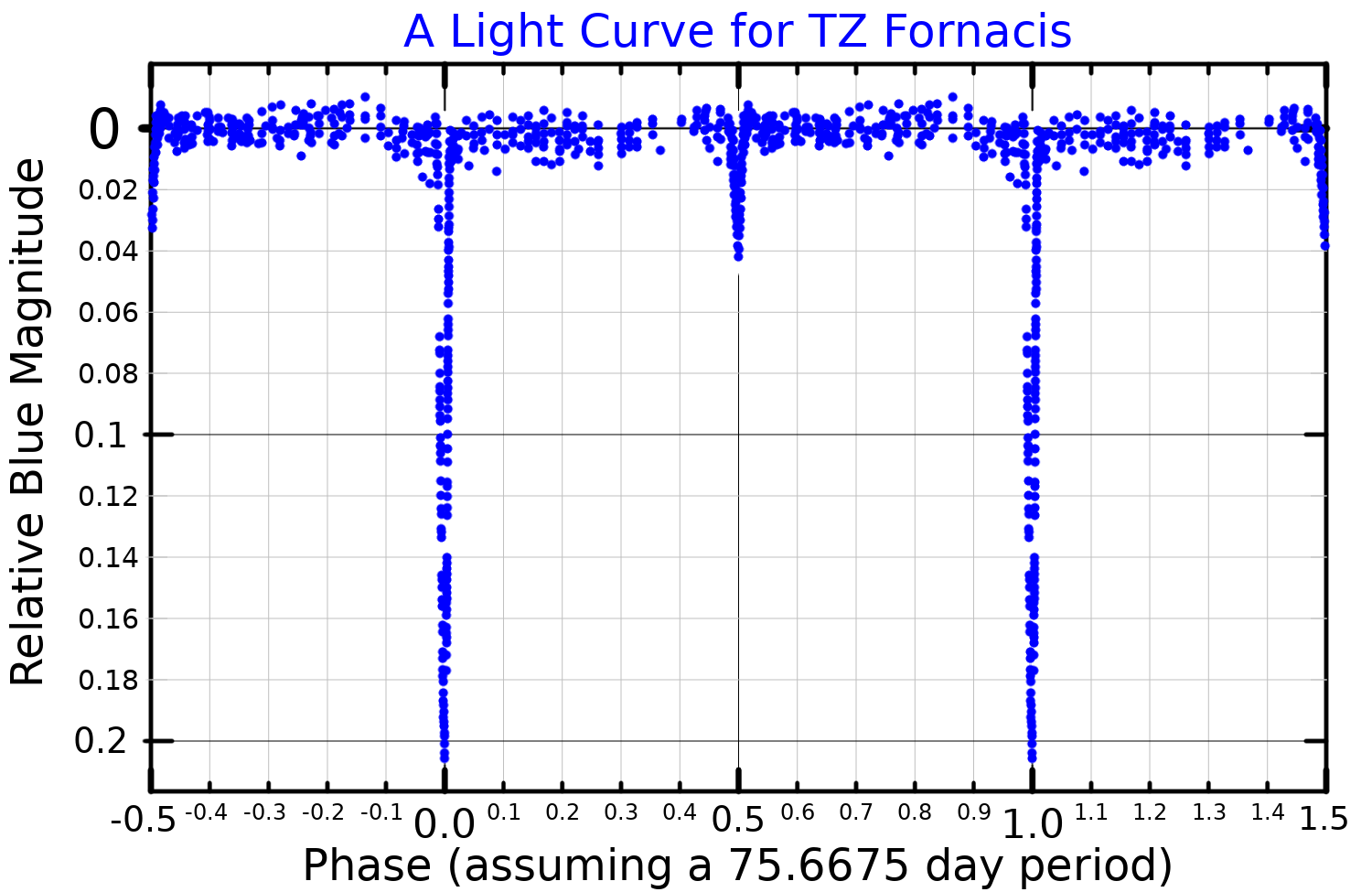
- A blue band light curve for TZ Fornacis, adapted from Andersen et al. (1991)

Observation data Epoch J2000.0 Equinox ICRS
- Constellation: Fornax
- Right ascension: 03^{h} 14^{m} 40.093^{s}
- Declination: −35° 33′ 27.59″
- Apparent magnitude (V): 6.88 (7.51 + 7.76)

Characteristics
- Evolutionary stage: Giant + subgiant
- Spectral type: G8 III + F7 III
- B−V color index: 0.740±0.006
- Variable type: Algol

Astrometry
Radial velocity (R_{v})	18.0±2.4 km/s
Proper motion (μ)	RA: 34.598 mas/yr Dec.: 17.389 mas/yr
Parallax (π)	5.4708±0.0193 mas
Distance	596 ± 2 ly (182.8 ± 0.6 pc)
Absolute magnitude (M_{V})	0.70

Orbit
Primary	A
Name	B
Period (P)	75.66647±0.00006 d
Semi-major axis (a)	2.993±0.030 mas 0.5564±0.0001 AU
Eccentricity (e)	0.00002±0.00003
Inclination (i)	85.68±0.05°
Longitude of the node (Ω)	65.99±0.03°
Argument of periastron (ω) (secondary)	269.93±0.04°
Semi-amplitude (K_{1}) (primary)	38.90±0.01 km/s
Semi-amplitude (K_{2}) (secondary)	40.87±0.02 km/s

Details

A
Mass	2.057±0.001 M_{☉}
Radius	8.28±0.22 R_{☉}
Luminosity	37.2^{+1.8}_{−1.7} L_{☉}
Surface gravity (log g)	2.91±0.02 cgs
Temperature	4,930±30 K
Metallicity [Fe/H]	0.02±0.05 dex
Rotational velocity (v sin i)	6.1±0.3 km/s
Age	1.20±0.10 Gyr

B
Mass	1.958±0.001 M_{☉}
Radius	3.94±0.17 R_{☉}
Luminosity	22.9^{+1.5}_{−1.6} L_{☉}
Surface gravity (log g)	3.35±0.02 cgs
Temperature	6,650±200 K
Metallicity [Fe/H]	−0.05±0.10 dex
Rotational velocity (v sin i)	45.7±1.0 km/s

Other designations
- CD−36° 1218, FK5 1090, GC 3886, HD 20301, HIP 15092, SAO 194176, PPM 278845

Database references
SIMBAD	data

TZ Fornacis is an eclipsing binary star system in the southern constellation of Fornax. It has the designation HD 20301 from the Henry Draper Catalogue; TZ Fornacis is the variable star designation, abbreviated TZ For. This target is a challenge to view with the naked eye, having a peak apparent visual magnitude of 6.88. During an eclipse, the magnitude drops to 7.05. This system is located at a distance of approximately 596 light years from the Sun based on parallax measurements, and is drifting further away with a radial velocity of roughly 18 km/s.

== Observations ==
In 1977, J. Andersen and B. Nordström identified HD 20301 as a double-lined spectroscopic binary star system. The same year, E. H. Olsen determined this to be an eclipsing binary system that included an aging giant star. This made it of interest to astronomers because the orbital elements could be used to more precisely determine the mass and radius of an evolved star. The two stars are of similar mass and both have evolved away from the main sequence, giving them an enlarged radius.

The orbital plane for this system is nearly aligned with the line of sight to the Earth, so with each orbit the components are seen to eclipse each other over an orbital period of 75.67 days. However, these eclipses are shallow so there is not a complete occultation. The orbit has been circularized by tidal forces between the stars, but only the more massive component has had its rotation tidally synchronized with the orbit. The system is fully detached with neither component overrunning its Roche lobe.

The primary component, designated TZ Fornacis A, has a spectrum that matches an aging G-type giant star with a stellar classification of G8 III. It is estimated to be 1.2 billion years old and is spinning in synchronicity with the orbital rotation. Based on the abundance of iron, the metallicity of this star is essentially the same as in the Sun. It has double the mass of the Sun and has expanded to over 8 times the Sun's radius. The star is radiating 37 times the luminosity of the Sun from its enlarged photosphere at an effective temperature of 4,930 K.

The secondary star, designated TZ Fornacis B, is an F-type subgiant star with a class of F7 III. Models suggest it has just left the main sequence. The star is still small enough that its rotation rate hasn't been significantly impacted by tidal interaction. It has a relatively high projected rotational velocity of 46 km/s. The star has nearly double the mass of the Sun and four times the Sun's radius. It is radiating 23 times the luminosity of the Sun at an effective temperature of 6,650 K, making it the hotter star in this system.
