= Eta2 Fornacis =

Star in the constellation Fornax

η^{2} Fornacis
- Location of η^{2} Fornacis (bottom star inside circle)

Observation data Epoch J2000.0 Equinox J2000.0 (ICRS)
- Constellation: Fornax
- Right ascension: 02^{h} 50^{m} 14.7837^{s}
- Declination: −35° 50′ 37.023″
- Apparent magnitude (V): 5.47

Characteristics
- Evolutionary stage: red giant branch
- Spectral type: K0III
- B−V color index: 0.9

Astrometry
Radial velocity (R_{v})	17.30±0.76 km/s
Proper motion (μ)	RA: +51.003 mas/yr Dec.: +18.217 mas/yr
Parallax (π)	7.6745±0.1512 mas
Distance	425 ± 8 ly (130 ± 3 pc)

Details
Mass	2.9 M_{☉}
Radius	9.4 R_{☉}
Luminosity	72 L_{☉}
Surface gravity (log g)	2.76 cgs
Temperature	5,061 K
Age	414 Myr

Other designations
- η^{2} For, CD−36°1067, HD 17793, HIP 13225, HR 851, SAO 193940

Database references
SIMBAD	data

Eta^{2} Fornacis (η^{2} Fornacis) is an orange giant in the constellation of Fornax. The star has a spectral type of K0III and an apparent magnitude of 6.02. The star is visually close to, but unrelated with the similar stars η^{1} Fornacis and η^{3} Fornacis. The star is located at approximately 425 light years away, and forms a visual binary system with a 10th magnitude companion.
