= HD 20781 =

Star in a binary star system in the constellation Fornax

Observation data Epoch J2000.0 Equinox ICRS
- Constellation: Fornax
- Right ascension: 03^{h} 20^{m} 02.94286^{s}
- Declination: −28° 47′ 01.7905″
- Apparent magnitude (V): 8.48

Characteristics
- Spectral type: K0V
- B−V color index: 0.82

Astrometry
Radial velocity (R_{v})	40.27±0.12 km/s
Proper motion (μ)	RA: 348.869±0.015 mas/yr Dec.: −66.614±0.019 mas/yr
Parallax (π)	27.8123±0.0239 mas
Distance	117.3 ± 0.1 ly (35.96 ± 0.03 pc)
Absolute magnitude (M_{V})	5.70

Details
Mass	0.7 M_{☉}
Luminosity	0.49±0.04 L_{☉}
Surface gravity (log g)	4.37±0.05 cgs
Temperature	5256±29 K
Metallicity [Fe/H]	−0.11±0.02 dex
Rotation	46.8±4.4 d
Rotational velocity (v sin i)	1.1 km/s

Other designations
- CD–29° 1229, HIP 15526, LTT 1581, SAO 168468, 2MASS J03200291-2847016, Gaia DR1 5060105892897388288

Database references
SIMBAD	data
Exoplanet Archive	data

HD 20781 is a star which is part of a wide binary system with HD 20782. The companion star has a very large angular separation of 252 arcsec, corresponding to 9080 AU at the distance of HD 20782. Both stars possess their own planetary systems in S type orbits, with a total of five known planets around both stars. This is the first known example of planets being found orbiting both components of a wide binary system. HD 20781 has no noticeable starspot activity.

== Planetary system ==
In 2011, a pair of Neptune-mass gas giants were detected with the radial velocity method. In 2017, these planets were confirmed and an additional two inner super-Earths were detected, with periods of 5.3 and 13.9 days respectively.

The HD 20781 planetary system
Companion (in order from star)	Mass	Semimajor axis (AU)	Orbital period (days)	Eccentricity	Inclination (°)	Radius
b	≥1.93+0.39 −0.36 M_{🜨}	0.0529+0.0024 −0.0027	5.3135±0.0010	0.10+0.11 −0.07	—	—
c	≥5.33+0.70 −0.67 M_{🜨}	0.1004+0.0046 −0.0051	13.8905+0.0033 −0.0034	0.09+0.09 −0.06	—	—
d	≥10.61+1.20 −1.19 M_{🜨}	0.1647+0.0076 −0.0083	29.1580+0.0102 −0.0100	0.11+0.05 −0.06	—	—
e	≥14.03±1.56 M_{🜨}	0.3374+0.0155 −0.0170	85.5073+0.0983 −0.0947	0.06+0.06 −0.04	—	—

== See also ==
Other systems with multiple planet-hosting stars:

- 55 Cancri
- HD 133131
- WASP-94
- XO-2
- Struve 2398
