= XO-3b =

Extrasolar planet in the constellation Camelopardalis

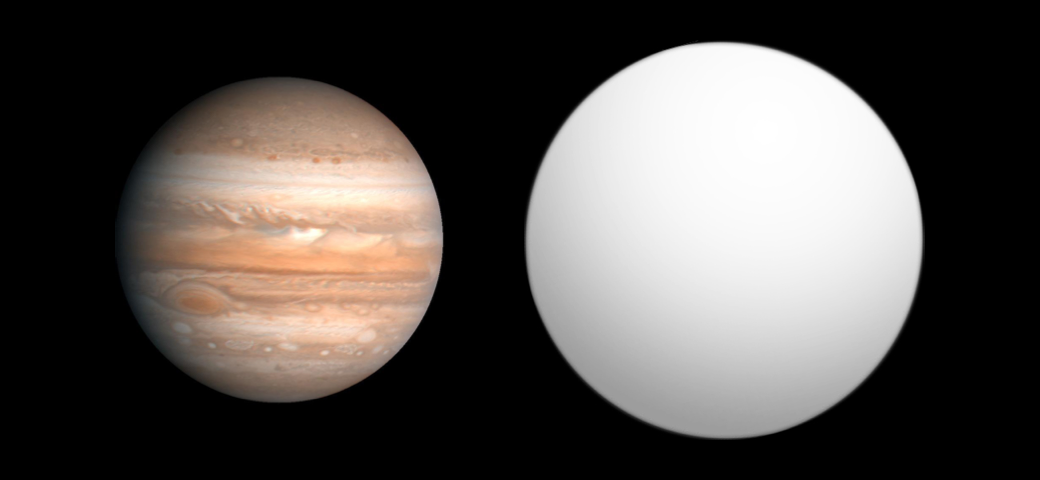
- Size comparison of XO-3b with Jupiter.

Discovery
- Discovered by: XO Project
- Discovery site: XO telescope Maui, Hawaii
- Discovery date: May 30, 2007
- Detection method: Transit, Radial velocity

Orbital characteristics
- Semi-major axis: 0.0454 ± 0.00082 AU (6,792,000 ± 123,000 km)
- Eccentricity: 0.2883 ± 0.0025
- Orbital period (sidereal): 3.1915289 ± 0.0000032 d
- Inclination: 84.20 ± 0.54
- Argument of periastron: 346.1^{+1.2}_{−1.1}
- Semi-amplitude: 1494.0 ± 9.5
- Star: XO-3

Physical characteristics
- Mean radius: 1.217 ± 0.073 R_{J}
- Mass: 11.79 ± 0.59 M_{J}
- Albedo: 0.106^{+0.008}_{−0.106}
- Temperature: 1400-2000 K

XO-3b is an exoplanet with about 11.79 times the mass of Jupiter, and it orbits its parent star XO-3 in about 3.2 days. The radius of this object is 1.217 times that of Jupiter. Astronomers announced their discovery on May 30, 2007, at the American Astronomical Society in Honolulu, Hawaii. Its discovery is attributed to the combined effort of amateur and professional astronomers working together on the XO Project using a telescope located on the Haleakala summit in Hawaii.

Dubbed an "oddball" planet, at the time of its discovery the planet was the most massive planet found in close proximity to a star, yet the orbit is significantly elliptical instead of circular, as would be expected. It is also considered a transiting planet, passing in front of its parent star during each orbit. It is the third such planet to be found by the XO Project which was specifically created to locate them.

== Planetary orbit ==
Measurements of the Rossiter–McLaughlin effect allow a determination of the angle between the planet's orbital plane and the equator of the parent star. Initial reports suggested this angle was very large, at 70 ± 15 degrees, which is significantly larger than that of the other transiting planets for which this measurement has been made. The authors cautioned that systematic effects may have affected the measurements, and a later determination by an independent group of astronomers determined a reduced value of 37.3±3.0°. This value is, however, still larger than the misalignment between the Sun's equator and the orbital plane of Jupiter, which is only 6°.

The misalignment may indicate that in the past an encounter with another planet altered its orbit, kicking it out of the plane of the planetary system. Its orbital eccentricity is very large (e = 0.2883). Since tidal forces should have reduced the orbital eccentricity of this planet it is possible that there is another massive planet outside the orbit of XO-3 that is in orbital resonance with XO-3b. Another planetary system that may have also undergone such planet–planet interactions is Upsilon Andromedae.

Due to tidal dissipation, the planetary orbital period is decaying at a rate of (6.2±0.29)×10^{−9}, or about 1.7 ms per orbit. At this rate, the planet will be engulfed by its star in about 1.4 million years. However, unlike the similar planet WASP-12b, it is unlikely to be experiencing significant mass loss.

== Atmosphere ==
Observations of several transits in the near ultraviolet by the Neil Gehrels Swift Observatory results in a measured planetary radius, in the near ultraviolet, of 2.54 times that of Jupiter.

== Debate ==
There is currently a debate over the classification of this object as either a planet or a brown dwarf. One of the leading astronomers in this discussion is Christopher Johns-Krull, who indicated that the debate is still quite lively. This is not particularly unusual or strange, as it would not be the first of many brown dwarfs orbiting mother stars.

The light curve that best matches the steepness of ingress and egress implies a planetary radius of 1.32 ± 0.15 R_{J} and a mass of 11.71 ± 0.46 M_{J}.

== See also ==
- XO Telescope
