= Phi Fornacis =

Star in the constellation Fornax

Observation data Epoch J2000 Equinox J2000
- Constellation: Fornax
- Right ascension: 02^{h} 28^{m} 01.70348^{s}
- Declination: −33° 48′ 39.7382″
- Apparent magnitude (V): 5.13

Characteristics
- Spectral type: A2.5V
- B−V color index: +0.089±0.003

Astrometry
Radial velocity (R_{v})	+19.0±4.2 km/s
Proper motion (μ)	RA: +18.526 mas/yr Dec.: +5.163 mas/yr
Parallax (π)	21.1604±0.1410 mas
Distance	154 ± 1 ly (47.3 ± 0.3 pc)
Absolute magnitude (M_{V})	1.79

Details
Mass	2.11 M_{☉}
Radius	1.74 R_{☉}
Luminosity	16.66 L_{☉}
Surface gravity (log g)	4.27 cgs
Temperature	9,449±321 K
Rotational velocity (v sin i)	116.8±0.8 km/s
Age	238 Myr

Other designations
- φ For, CD−34°905, FK5 2168, GC 2967, HD 15427, HIP 11477, HR 724, SAO 193723

Database references
SIMBAD	data

Phi Fornacis is a single star in the southern constellation of Fornax. It has a white hue and is faintly visible to the naked eye with an apparent visual magnitude of 5.13. The distance to this object is approximately 154 light-years based on parallax, and it is drifting further away with a radial velocity of +19 km/s.

This is an A-type main-sequence star with a stellar classification of A2.5V. Phi Fornacis is 238 million years old and is spinning with a projected rotational velocity of 117 km/s. It has 2.1 times the mass of the Sun and 1.7 times the Sun's radius. The star is radiating 17 times the luminosity of the Sun from its photosphere at an effective temperature of 9,449 km/s. It displays an infrared excess, suggesting a circumstellar disk of dust is orbiting the star at a distance of 30.2 AU with a mean temperature of 100 K.
