= Delta Fornacis =

Star in the constellation Fornax

δ Fornacis
Observation data Epoch J2000.0 Equinox J2000.0 (ICRS)
- Constellation: Fornax
- Right ascension: 03^{h} 42^{m} 14.90238^{s}
- Declination: −31° 56′ 18.0961″
- Apparent magnitude (V): 5.00

Characteristics
- Spectral type: B5 III
- U−B color index: −0.60
- B−V color index: −0.16

Astrometry
Radial velocity (R_{v})	+26.00 km/s
Proper motion (μ)	RA: +4.942 mas/yr Dec.: +13.326 mas/yr
Parallax (π)	4.1125±0.2114 mas
Distance	790 ± 40 ly (240 ± 10 pc)
Absolute magnitude (M_{V})	−2.07

Details
Mass	5.9±0.2 M_{☉}
Radius	6.0 R_{☉}
Luminosity	1,291 L_{☉}
Temperature	16,230±930 K
Rotational velocity (v sin i)	185 km/s
Age	63.1±16.1 Myr

Other designations
- δ For, CD−32°1430, FK5 133, HD 23227, HIP 17304, HR 1134, SAO 194467

Database references
SIMBAD	data

Delta Fornacis, Latinized from δ Fornacis, is a solitary, blue-white hued star near the middle of the southern constellation of Fornax. With an apparent visual magnitude of 5.00, it is faintly visible to the naked eye at night. The star has an annual parallax shift of 4.1 mas, indicating it lies at a distance of approximately 790 light years from the Sun. It is drifting further away with a radial velocity of +26 km/s.

The stellar classification of Delta Fornacis is B5 III, matching an evolved B-type giant star. It has an angular diameter of 0.215±0.015 mas, which, at the estimated distance of the star, yields a physical size of around 6 times the radius of the Sun. Around 63 million years old, the star is spinning rapidly with a projected rotational velocity of 185 km/s. It has an estimated 5.9 times the Sun's mass and radiates 1,291 times the solar luminosity from its outer atmosphere at an effective temperature of 16,230 K.
