= Eta3 Fornacis =

Star in the constellation Fornax

η^{3} Fornacis
- Location of η^{3} Fornacis (top star inside circle)

Observation data Epoch J2000.0 Equinox J2000.0 (ICRS)
- Constellation: Fornax
- Right ascension: 02^{h} 50^{m} 40.407^{s}
- Declination: −35° 40′ 33.06″
- Apparent magnitude (V): 5.47

Characteristics
- Evolutionary stage: red giant branch
- Spectral type: K2III
- U−B color index: +1.31
- B−V color index: +1.25

Astrometry
Radial velocity (R_{v})	13.10±0.12 km/s
Proper motion (μ)	RA: +4.093 mas/yr Dec.: −54.551 mas/yr
Parallax (π)	6.6631±0.0580 mas
Distance	489 ± 4 ly (150 ± 1 pc)
Absolute magnitude (M_{V})	−0.26

Details
Mass	3.7 M_{☉}
Radius	21.9 R_{☉}
Luminosity	249 L_{☉}
Surface gravity (log g)	2.27 cgs
Temperature	4,717 K
Metallicity [Fe/H]	0.156 dex
Rotational velocity (v sin i)	<1 km/s
Age	217 Myr

Other designations
- η^{3} For, CD−36°1070, HD 17829, HIP 13265, HR 848, SAO 193944

Database references
SIMBAD	data

Eta^{3} Fornacis (η^{3} Fornacis) is an orange giant in the constellation of Fornax. The star has a spectral type of K2III and an apparent magnitude of 5.47. The star is visually close to, but unrelated with the similar stars η^{2} Fornacis and η^{1} Fornacis. The star is located at approximately 489 light years away with a luminosity of about 249 L_{☉}, and is a suspected binary system with the primary being the orange giant.
