= Brown dwarf desert =

Concept in astronomy

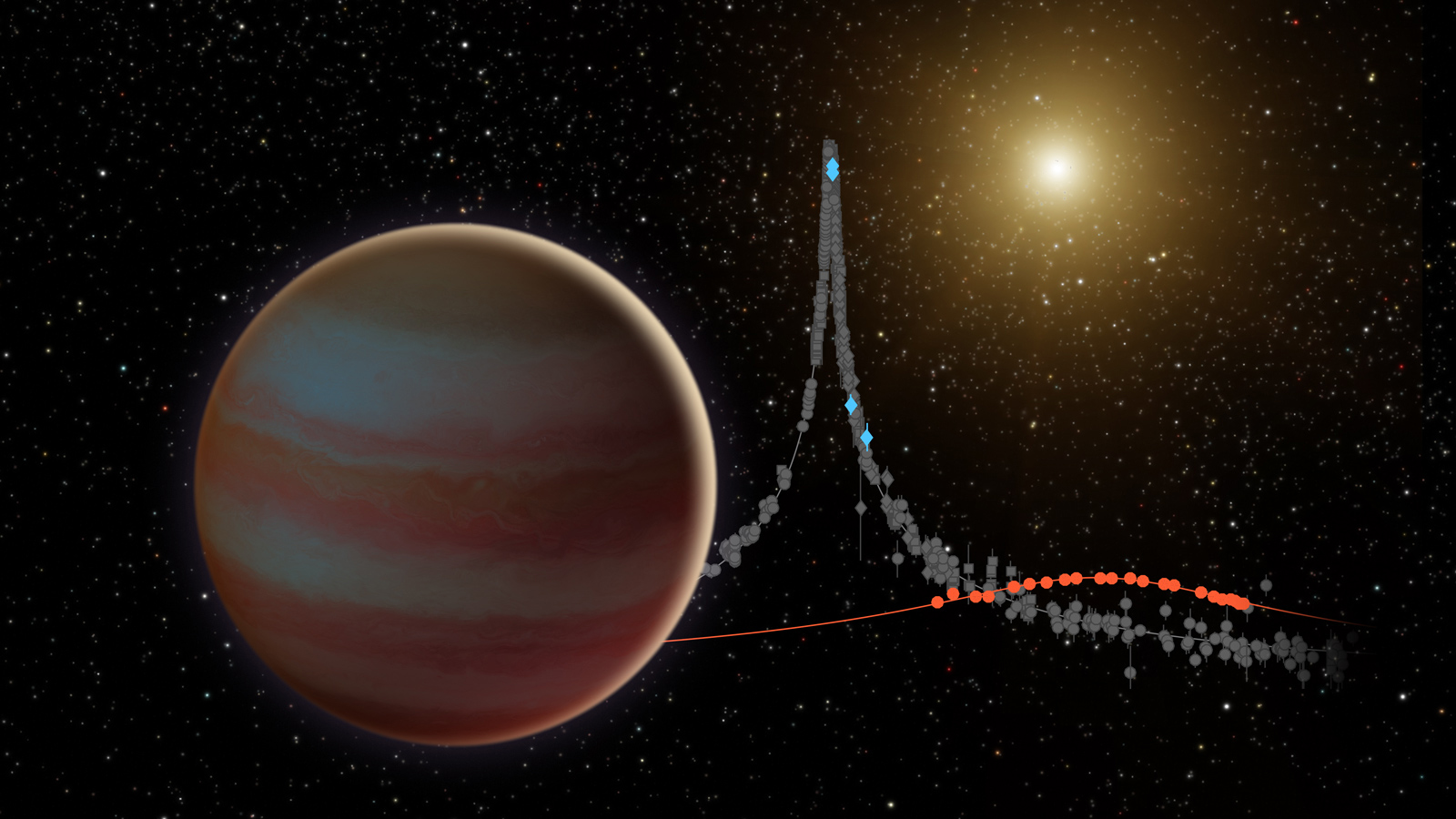
The brown dwarf OGLE-2015-BLG-1319, discovered in 2016, possibly does fall in the desert range.

The brown-dwarf desert is a theorized range of orbits around a star within which brown dwarfs are unlikely to be found as companion objects. This is usually up to 5 AU around solar mass stars. The paucity of brown dwarfs in close orbits was first noted between 1998 and 2000 when a sufficient number of extrasolar planets had been found to perform statistical studies. Astronomers discovered there is a distinct shortage of brown dwarfs within 5 AU of the stars with companions, while an abundance of free-floating brown dwarfs were discovered. Subsequent studies have shown that brown dwarfs orbiting their stars within 3–5 AU are found around fewer than 1% of stars with a mass similar to that of the Sun (M_{☉}). Of the brown dwarfs that were found in the brown-dwarf desert, most were found in multiple stellar systems, suggesting that binarity was a key factor in the creation of brown-dwarf desert inhabitants.

One of the many possible reasons for the existence of the desert relates to planetary (and brown dwarf) migration. If a brown dwarf were to form within 5 AU of its companion star, the two objects' strong mutual gravitational attraction could plausibly cause the dwarf to migrate inwards towards the central star and eventually fall into it. That being said, the exact details of migration within a protoplanetary disk are not completely understood, and it is equally plausible that brown dwarf companions to main-sequence stars of classes F, G, and K, whose masses are moderately low, would not undergo appreciable migration after their formation. A second possible reason is, depending on which formation paradigm is invoked, that a formation by core accretion should make the formation of higher mass brown dwarfs unlikely, as the gas accretion rate during runaway accretion onto high mass forming objects is reduced due to gap formation in the disk. The limited disk life time then truncates the mass range, limiting the maximum masses to approximately 10 Jupiter masses (M_{J}). This effect might be somewhat mitigated by the fact that objects of 3–5 M_{J} and above might excite eccentric perturbations in the disk, allowing for non-negligible mass accretion even in the presence of a gap. Objects that form further outside (a>80 AU), where the disk is prone to gravitational instabilities, might be able to reach the masses required to cross the planet–brown dwarf threshold. These objects seem unlikely to migrate into the inner regions of the disk, however, because of the long type-II migration timescale for objects in the brown-dwarf mass regime.

== See also ==
- Neptunian desert
