= Peter R. McCullough =

American astronomer (born 1964)

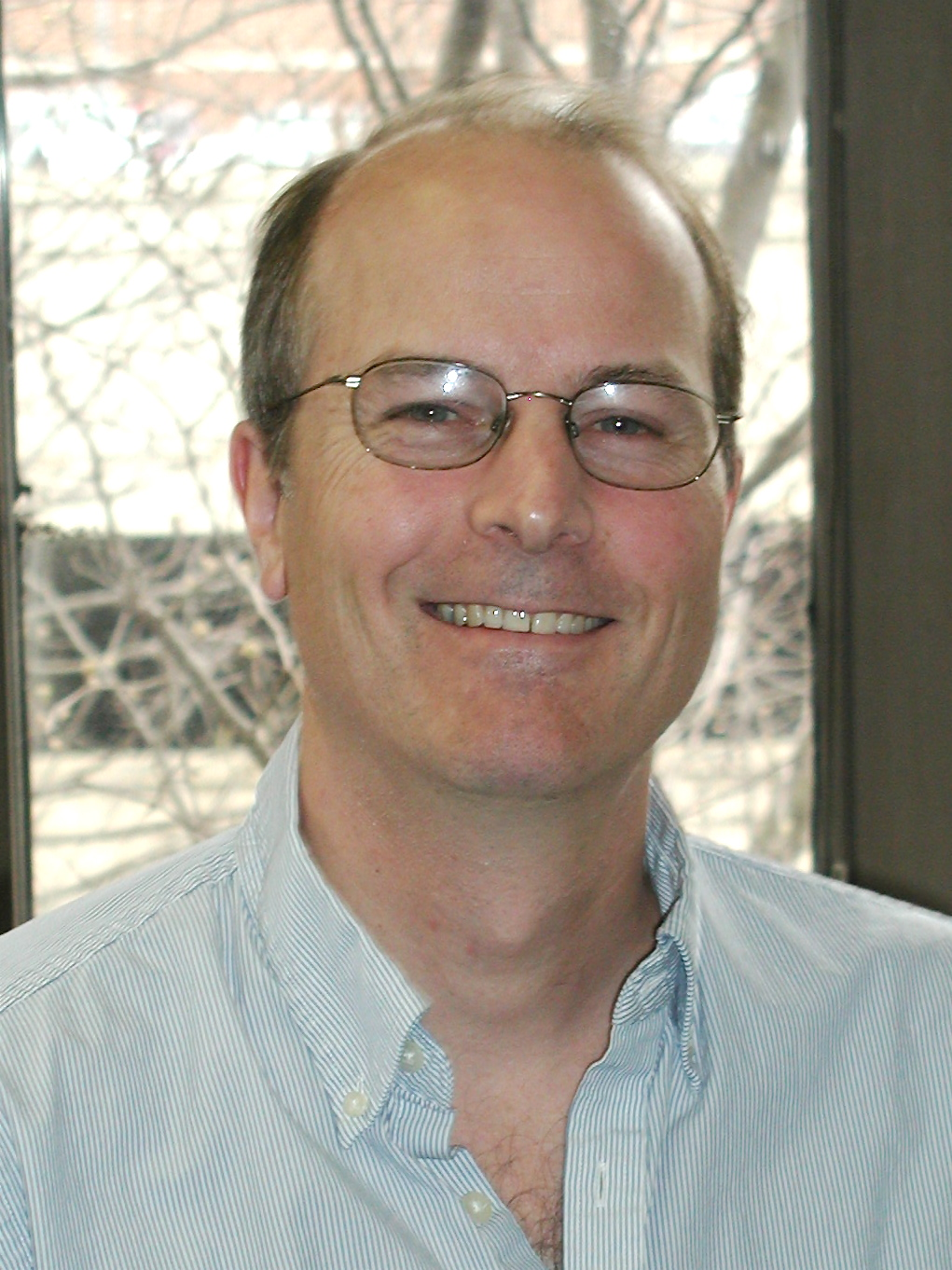
- McCullough c. 2008
- Born: August 20, 1964 (age 62); Providence, Rhode Island, U.S.
- Education: University of North Carolina at Chapel Hill, University of California, Berkeley
- Known for: Discovering transiting extrasolar planets
- Relatives: David McCullough
- Scientific career
- Fields: Astronomy
- Workplaces: Johns Hopkins University, Space Telescope Science Institute
- Doctoral advisor: Carl Heiles

Peter R. McCullough (/məˈkʌlə/; born August 20, 1964) is an American astronomer, founder of the XO Project and discoverer of extrasolar transiting planets, such as XO-1b. Soon after the U.S. declassification of the laser beacon adaptive optics technique in 1991, he identified dusty disks around newborn stars, later referred to as proplyds, in observations of the Orion Nebula made with the Starfire Optical Range. Astronomers John Gaustad, McCullough, and David Van Buren with engineer Wayne Rosing mapped the entire southern sky in the hydrogen alpha transition with sufficient sensitivity for decontamination of the Milky Way from the cosmic microwave background. McCullough's modification to the Stromgren sphere model often produces more realistic results than the original.

== Biography ==
=== Education ===
McCullough attended public primary school in Massachusetts and Athens Drive High School in North Carolina. In summers between his undergraduate years, he interned at the Wind River National Outdoor Leadership School, the Palo Alto CA police department, Weyerhauser, and the National Radio Astronomy Observatory's Very Large Array. McCullough received a Bachelor of Science in physics in 1986 from the University of North Carolina at Chapel Hill. At the University of California, Berkeley, he earned a PhD in astrophysics in 1993.

=== Employment ===
McCullough was a Hubble postdoctoral fellow, and then an assistant professor in the Astronomy Department of the University of Illinois Urbana-Champaign. Since 2002 he has been employed by the Space Telescope Science Institute. He also works on the science team of the Transiting Exoplanet Survey Satellite. In 2009-2010 he was a visiting scientist at the Smithsonian Astrophysical Observatory and the Institut d'astrophysique de Paris.

== Awards and fellowships ==
McCullough has received numerous awards throughout his career. His undergraduate education was supported entirely by merit scholarships. NASA granted him a graduate student researcher award and a Hubble postdoctoral fellowship in 1993. He was a recipient of the Sloan Fellowship. In recognition of his university teaching and research, the U.S. National Science Foundation granted him a CAREER award and the Research Corporation selected him as a Cottrell Scholar.

== See also ==
- List of stars with confirmed planets
