= Lambda1 Fornacis =

Star in the constellation Fornax

Lambda^{1} Fornacis
- Location of Lambda^{1} Fornacis (circled)

Observation data Epoch J2000.0 Equinox J2000.0
- Constellation: Fornax
- Right ascension: 02^{h} 33^{m} 07.0259^{s}
- Declination: −34° 38′ 59.882″
- Apparent magnitude (V): 5.91

Characteristics
- Evolutionary stage: Horizontal branch
- Spectral type: K0/1III
- U−B color index: +2.14
- B−V color index: +1.06

Astrometry
Radial velocity (R_{v})	+10.29±0.14 km/s
Proper motion (μ)	RA: −18.216±0.017 mas/yr Dec.: −18.058±0.026 mas/yr
Parallax (π)	8.5123±0.0286 mas
Distance	383 ± 1 ly (117.5 ± 0.4 pc)
Absolute magnitude (M_{V})	0.67

Details
Mass	2.32 M_{☉}
Radius	12.38 R_{☉}
Luminosity	66 L_{☉}
Surface gravity (log g)	2.32 cgs
Temperature	4,770 K
Metallicity [Fe/H]	0.18±0.14 dex
Rotational velocity (v sin i)	2.00 km/s

Other designations
- λ^{1} For, CD−35°877, GC 3067, HD 15975, HIP 11867, HR 744, SAO 193763, PPM 278055, GCRV 53183

Database references
SIMBAD	data

λ^{1} Fornacis, Latinized as Lambda^{1} Fornacis, is a red giant star in the southern constellation of Fornax. It is just visible to the naked eye as a dim, yellow-hued point of light with an apparent visual magnitude of 5.91. The star is located 383 light years from the Sun, based on stellar parallax, and is drifting further away with a radial velocity of +10 km/s.

λ^{1} Fornacis is a K-type giant star with a stellar classification of K0/1III, showing it has exhausted its core hydrogen and evolved away from the main sequence. It is currently on the horizontal branch, fusing helium in its core. The star has 2.3 times the mass of the Sun and 12 times its radius. It is radiating 66 times the luminosity of the Sun from its photosphere at an effective temperature of 4,770 K. The abundance of elements with mass higher than helium is similar to the Sun.
