= HD 16417 b =

Extrasolar planet in the constellation Fornax

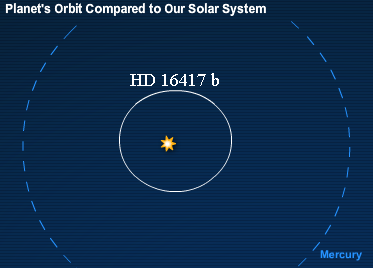
- HD 16417 b's orbit compared to Mercury's orbit (0.38AU) in the Solar System.

Discovery
- Discovered by: O’Toole et al.
- Discovery site: Anglo-Australian Observatory
- Discovery date: February 23, 2009
- Detection method: radial velocity

Orbital characteristics
- Apastron: 0.17 AU (25,000,000 km)
- Periastron: 0.11 AU (16,000,000 km)
- Semi-major axis: 0.14 ± 0.01 AU (20,900,000 ± 1,500,000 km)
- Eccentricity: 0.20 ± 0.09
- Orbital period (sidereal): 17.24 ± 0.01 d 0.04720 ± 0.00003 y
- Time of periastron: 2450099.74 ± 3.3
- Argument of periastron: 77 ± 26
- Star: HD 16417

HD 16417 b (also called λ^{2} Fornacis b) is an extrasolar planet located approximately 83 light years away in the constellation of Fornax, orbiting the 6th magnitude G-type main sequence star HD 16417. This planet has a minimum mass only 7% that of Jupiter, making it a Neptune-mass planet. In addition to this, it orbits relatively close to the host star and suffers high temperature. It is the third planet discovered in the Fornax constellation on February 23, 2009. This planet was discovered by a method called the radial velocity method.
