= Gamma1 Fornacis =

Star in the constellation Fornax

γ^{1} Fornacis
- Location of γ^{1} Fornacis (circled)

Observation data Epoch J2000.0 Equinox J2000.0 (ICRS)
- Constellation: Fornax
- Right ascension: 02^{h} 49^{m} 50.96219^{s}
- Declination: −24° 33′ 37.1290″
- Apparent magnitude (V): 6.154

Characteristics
- Spectral type: G9 III
- B−V color index: 1.081

Astrometry
Radial velocity (R_{v})	−6.58±0.64 km/s
Proper motion (μ)	RA: −51.603 mas/yr Dec.: −127.797 mas/yr
Parallax (π)	8.8835±0.0576 mas
Distance	367 ± 2 ly (112.6 ± 0.7 pc)
Absolute magnitude (M_{V})	+0.52±0.21

Details
Mass	1.65 M_{☉}
Radius	10.44+0.73 −0.49 R_{☉}
Luminosity	50.814±0.439 L_{☉}
Surface gravity (log g)	2.60 cgs
Temperature	4,657±56 K
Metallicity [Fe/H]	−0.02 dex
Age	3.36 Gyr

Other designations
- γ^{1} For, CD−25°1120, GC 3404, HD 17713, HIP 13197, HR 844, SAO 168081, WDS J02498-2434A

Database references
SIMBAD	data

Gamma^{1} Fornacis, which is Latinized from γ^{1} Fornacis, is a star in the constellation Fornax, positioned less than a degree south of the border with Eridanus. The star has a golden hue and can be a challenge to view with the naked eye even in good seeing conditions, having an apparent visual magnitude of 6.15. It is located at a distance of approximately 367 light years from the Sun based on parallax, but is drifting closer with a radial velocity of −7 km/s. The star has an absolute magnitude of +0.5.

The stellar classification of γ^{1} Fornacis is G9 III, which indicates this is an aging giant star that has exhausted the supply of hydrogen at its core, then cooled and expanded away from the main sequence. It is an estimated 3.4 billion years old with a metallicity that is close to solar, indicating the abundances of heavy elements are similar to those in the Sun. It has 1.65 times the mass of the Sun and has expanded to ten times the Sun's radius. The star is radiating 51 times the Sun's luminosity from its enlarged photosphere at an effective temperature of 4,657 K.

γ^{1} Fornacis has three visual companions listed in the Washington Double Star Catalog. These are faint 11th - 13th magnitude stars at 11' - 56' distance from γ^{1}. Gamma^{2} Fornacis is a 5th magnitude star located four degrees to the south.
