= Lambda2 Fornacis =

Binary star system in the constellation Fornax

Lambda^{2} Fornacis
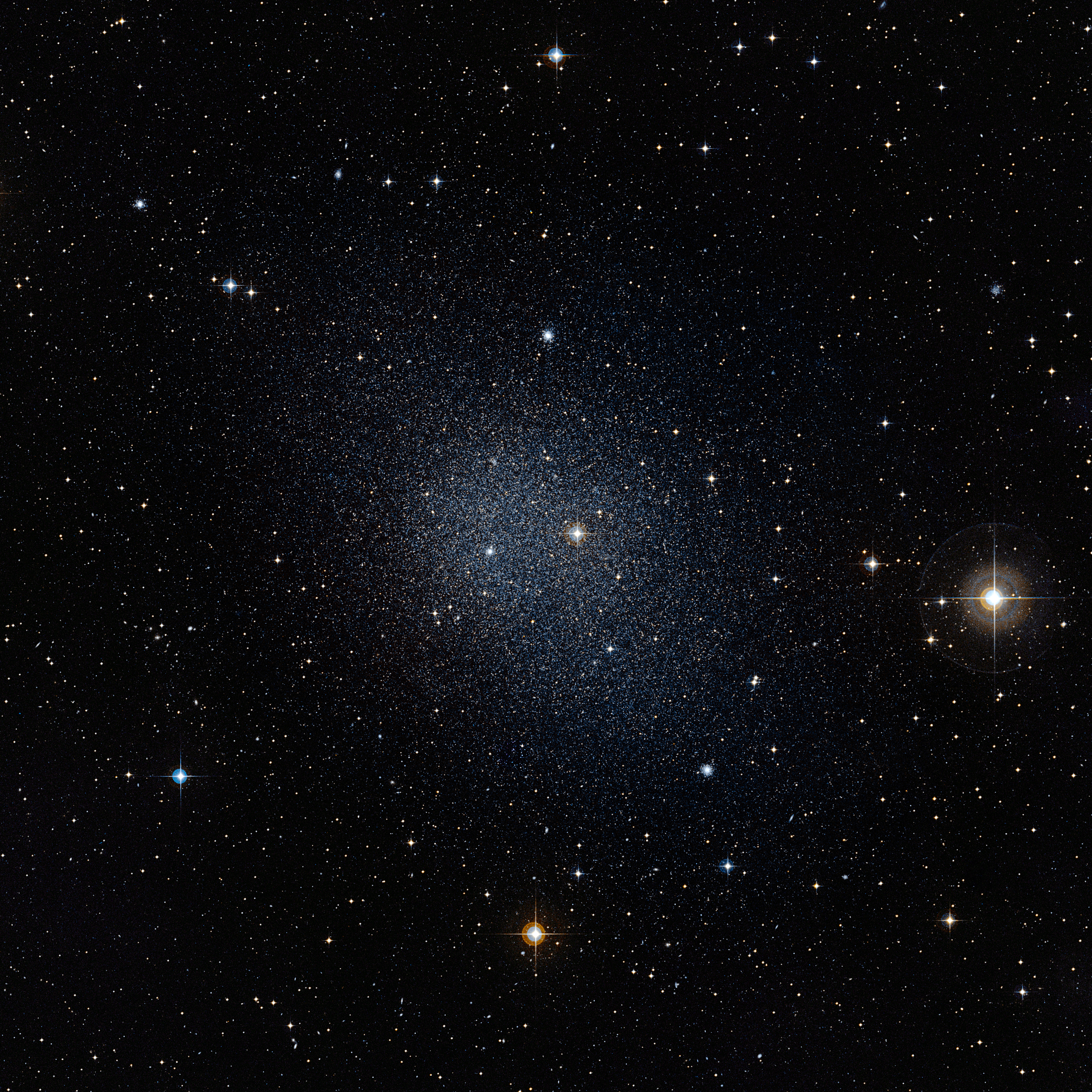
- λ^{2} Fornacis on the right of the Fornax Dwarf Galaxy; Credit: ESO/Digitized Sky Survey 2

Observation data Epoch J2000.0 Equinox ICRS
- Constellation: Fornax
- Right ascension: 02^{h} 36^{m} 58.60775^{s}
- Declination: −34° 34′ 40.7113″
- Apparent magnitude (V): 5.78

Characteristics
- Spectral type: G1V
- B−V color index: +0.653±0.005

Astrometry
Radial velocity (R_{v})	+11.16±0.12 km/s
Proper motion (μ)	RA: −18.363 mas/yr Dec.: −259.002 mas/yr
Parallax (π)	39.2946±0.0305 mas
Distance	83.00 ± 0.06 ly (25.45 ± 0.02 pc)
Absolute magnitude (M_{V})	3.74±0.04

Details

A
Mass	1.16±0.03 M_{☉}
Radius	1.63±0.04 R_{☉}
Luminosity	3.03 L_{☉}
Surface gravity (log g)	4.12±0.03 cgs
Temperature	5,829±80 K
Metallicity [Fe/H]	0.10±0.08 dex
Rotational velocity (v sin i)	1.4 or 3.2 km/s
Age	6.3±0.9 Gyr

B
Mass	0.11 M_{☉}

Other designations
- λ^{2} For, CD−5°903, GC 3153, GJ 105.1, HD 16417, HIP 12186, HR 772, SAO 193811, PPM 278138, LTT 1280, NLTT 8516, GCRV 1481, 2MASS J02365859-3434404, Gaia DR2 5062172841616745856

Database references
SIMBAD	data
Exoplanet Archive	data
ARICNS	data

λ^{2} Fornacis, Latinized as Lambda^{2} Fornacis, is the primary of a binary star system in the southern constellation of Fornax. It is just visible to the naked eye as a dim, yellow-hued point of light with an apparent visual magnitude of 5.78. It is located 83 light years distant from the Sun, based on stellar parallax, and is drifting further away with a radial velocity of +11.1 km/s.

This object is a G-type main-sequence star with a stellar classification of G1V. It is considered a solar analog, being photometrically-similar to the Sun. The star is an estimated 6.3 billion years old with 1.16 times the mass of the Sun and 1.63 times the Sun's radius. It is radiating three times the luminosity of the Sun from its photosphere at an effective temperature of 5,829 K. The abundance of elements with more mass than helium is 55% higher than in the Sun.

There is a faint co-moving companion star located to the east of the main star at an angular separation of 45″. This is most likely an M5–M6 class red dwarf with 0.11 times the Sun's mass. The projected separation between the pair is about 1,000 AU.

== Planetary system ==
Precision Doppler spectroscopy from an intensive 48 night observing campaign on the Anglo-Australian Telescope has revealed the presence of a low-mass extrasolar planet orbiting the star. This object has an orbital period of 17.25 days and an eccentricity of 0.14. It has a minimum (baseline) mass of 16.8 M_{🜨}.

The Lambda^{2} Fornacis planetary system
Companion (in order from star)	Mass	Semimajor axis (AU)	Orbital period (days)	Eccentricity	Inclination (°)	Radius
b	≥16.8+1.2 −1.3 M_{🜨}	0.14±0.01	17.251+0.002 −0.003	0.35±0.05	—	—
