= Gamma2 Fornacis =

Star in the constellation Fornax

γ^{2} Fornacis
- Location of γ^{2} Fornacis (circled)

Observation data Epoch J2000.0 Equinox J2000.0 (ICRS)
- Constellation: Fornax
- Right ascension: 02^{h} 49^{m} 54.1822^{s}
- Declination: −27° 56′ 31.123″
- Apparent magnitude (V): 5.389

Characteristics
- Evolutionary stage: Main sequence
- Spectral type: A1 V
- B−V color index: 0.013±0.004

Astrometry
Radial velocity (R_{v})	24.0±4.2 km/s
Proper motion (μ)	RA: −47.053 mas/yr Dec.: 20.932 mas/yr
Parallax (π)	6.3134±0.1330 mas
Distance	520 ± 10 ly (158 ± 3 pc)
Absolute magnitude (M_{V})	−0.35

Details
Mass	2.40+0.44 −0.38 M_{☉}
Radius	4.488 R_{☉}
Luminosity	117.073±0.111 L_{☉}
Surface gravity (log g)	3.50±0.25 cgs
Temperature	9,000±500 K
Metallicity [Fe/H]	−0.02 dex
Rotational velocity (v sin i)	149 km/s
Age	401+138 −170 Myr

Other designations
- γ^{2} For, CD−28°903, HD 17729, HIP 13202, HR 845, SAO 168082

Database references
SIMBAD	data

Gamma^{2} Fornacis, a name Latinized from γ^{2} Fornacis, is a single star in the southern constellation Fornax. It has a white hue and is faintly visible to the naked eye at night with an apparent visual magnitude of 5.4. The distance to Gamma^{2} Fornacis is approximately 520 light years based on parallax. It is drifting further away with a radial velocity of 24 km/s. Gamma^{1} Fornacis is a 6th magnitude star about four degrees to the north.

The stellar classification of Gamma^{2} Fornacis is A1 V, which is notation for an A-type main-sequence star that, like the Sun, is generating energy through core hydrogen fusion. Comparison of its properties to theoretical models suggest an age of about 400 million years old. It has a high rate of spin, showing a projected rotational velocity of 149 km/s. The star has 2.4 times the mass of the Sun and 4.5 times the Sun's radius. It is radiating 117 times the luminosity of the Sun from its photosphere at an effective temperature of roughly 9,000 K.
