= Epsilon Fornacis =

Star in the constellation Fornax

Observation data Epoch J2000.0 Equinox J2000.0 (ICRS)
- Constellation: Fornax
- Right ascension: 03^{h} 42^{m} 14.90248^{s}
- Declination: −31° 56′ 18.1055″
- Apparent magnitude (V): 5.89

Characteristics
- Spectral type: K2 V Fe-1.3 CH-0.8
- B−V color index: +0.79

Astrometry
| Radial velocity (R_{v}) | 42.71±0.10 km/s |
| Proper motion (μ) | RA: 271.744 ± 0.111 mas/yr Dec.: -442.885 ± 0.121 mas/yr |
| Parallax (π) | 31.2461±0.0919 mas |
| Distance | 104.4 ± 0.3 ly (32.00 ± 0.09 pc) |
| Absolute magnitude (M_{V}) | +3.34 |

Orbit
| Period (P) | 13,770±3,528 d |
| Semi-major axis (a) | 13±4 au |
| Eccentricity (e) | 0.28±0.07 |
| Periastron epoch (T) | 2450865±9 JD |
| Argument of periastron (ω) (secondary) | 314±34° |
| Semi-amplitude (K_{1}) (primary) | 3,112±1,903 km/s |

Details

ε For A
| Mass | 0.91±0.02 M_{☉} |
| Radius | 2.53±0.07 R_{☉} |
| Luminosity | 4.5 L_{☉} |
| Surface gravity (log g) | 3.65±0.09 cgs |
| Temperature | 5,068±39 K |
| Metallicity [Fe/H] | −0.61±0.04 dex |
| Rotational velocity (v sin i) | 1.12±0.23 km/s |
| Age | > 12 Gyr |

ε For B
| Mass | > 0.42±0.10 M_{☉} |

Other designations
- ε For, FK5 2215, HD 18907, HIP 14086, HR 914, SAO 168238

Database references
| SIMBAD | data |

ε Fornacis (Latinised as Epsilon Fornacis) is the Bayer designation for a high proper motion binary star in the southern constellation of Fornax. It is faintly visible to the naked eye with an apparent visual magnitude of 5.89. Based upon an annual parallax shift of 31.06 mas, the system is located roughly 105 light years from the Sun. At that distance, its visual magnitude is reduced by an interstellar absorption factor of 0.09 due to dust.

This is an astrometric binary star system. The best fit to the radial velocity data yields an orbital period of roughly 13,770 days (37.7 years) with an eccentricity of around 0.28. The semimajor axis of their computed orbit is about 13 au, or 13 times the distance of the Earth from the Sun. The primary, component A, is an evolved K-type subgiant star with a stellar classification of K2 V Fe-1.3 CH-0.8, where the suffix notation indicates the absorption lines of iron and the carbon-hydrogen bond are abnormally weak. However, classifications earlier than Gray et al. (2006) consistently showed it as type G5 IV, matching the subgiant categorization.

The primary has an estimated 91% of the Sun's mass, but has expanded to 253% times the Sun's radius. It has a quiet (inactive) chromosphere and is most likely an old star with an age over 12 billion years. The star is spinning slowly with a projected rotational velocity of 1.1 km/s. Since leaving the main sequence, it has increased in luminosity to 4.5 times that of the Sun, which is being radiated from its outer atmosphere at an effective temperature of 5,068 K.

Based upon its estimated orbit, the secondary, component B, has at least 42%±10% times of the Sun's mass.
