= HD 20781 e =

Extrasolar planet in the constellation Fornax

Discovery
- Discovered by: Mayor et al.
- Discovery date: 2011, published in 2019
- Detection method: Radial velocity

Orbital characteristics
- Semi-major axis: 0.3374+0.0155 −0.0170 AU
- Eccentricity: 0.06+0.06 −0.04
- Orbital period (sidereal): 85.5073+0.0983 −0.0947 d
- Time of periastron: 2,455,513.3912+14.3623 −16.0090 JD
- Argument of periastron: 70.59°+61.40° −67.58°
- Semi-amplitude: 2.60±0.14 m/s
- Star: HD 20781

Physical characteristics
- Mean radius: ~2.17 R_{🜨} (estimate)
- Mass: ≥14.03±1.56 M_{🜨}

HD 20781 e is a hot Neptune around the star HD 20781. The planet has a minimum mass of 14.03 Earth masses and it orbits with a semi-major axis of 0.3374 astronomical units and an orbital eccentricity of approximately 0.06. With the same composition as Neptune, it would have a radius of 3.79 times that of the Earth. With the same composition as Earth, it would have a radius of 2.08 times that of the Earth. It orbits near the inner edge of the habitable zone of HD 20781.

This planet was initially reported in a 2011 preprint, which referred to it as HD 20781 c. However, the 2017 paper (published in a journal in 2019) that confirmed the planet designated it HD 20781 e, using the c designation for a different, shorter-period planet.
