= Pi Fornacis =

Star in the constellation Fornax

Observation data Epoch J2000.0 Equinox J2000.0 (ICRS)
- Constellation: Fornax
- Right ascension: 02^{h} 01^{m} 14.72287^{s}
- Declination: −30° 00′ 06.5893″
- Apparent magnitude (V): 5.360

Characteristics
- Spectral type: G8 III
- U−B color index: +0.471
- B−V color index: +0.882

Astrometry
Radial velocity (R_{v})	24.40±0.10 km/s
Proper motion (μ)	RA: −109.489 mas/yr Dec.: −108.749 mas/yr
Parallax (π)	11.2737±0.0653 mas
Distance	289 ± 2 ly (88.7 ± 0.5 pc)
Absolute magnitude (M_{V})	+0.68

Details

π For A
Mass	1.32±0.04 M_{☉}
Radius	10.408±0.166 R_{☉}
Luminosity	58.7±1.2 L_{☉}
Surface gravity (log g)	2.75±0.05 cgs
Temperature	5,048±26 K
Metallicity [Fe/H]	−0.56±0.03 dex
Rotational velocity (v sin i)	0.92±0.44 km/s
Age	2.97±0.36 Gyr

π For B
Mass	0.5 M_{☉}

Other designations
- π For, CD−30°703, HD 12438, HIP 9440, HR 594, SAO 193455

Database references
SIMBAD	data

π Fornacis (Latinised as Pi Fornacis) is a binary star system in the southern constellation of Fornax. It has an apparent visual magnitude of 5.360, which is bright enough to be seen with the naked eye on a dark night. With an annual parallax shift of 11.27 mas, it is estimated to lie around 289 light years from the Sun. At that distance, the visual magnitude is diminished by an interstellar absorption factor of 0.10 due to dust.

This system is a member of the thin disk population of the Milky Way galaxy. The primary, component A, is an evolved G-type giant star with a stellar classification of G8 III. It has an estimated mass slightly higher than the Sun, but has expanded to more than nine times the Sun's radius. The star is roughly three billion years old and is spinning slowly with a projected rotational velocity of 0.9 km/s. Pi Fornacis A radiates 59 times the solar luminosity from its outer atmosphere at an effective temperature of 5,048 K.

A companion, component B, was discovered in 2008 using the AMBER instrument of the Very Large Telescope facility. At the time of discovery, this star lay at an estimated angular separation of 12.0±4.0 mas from the primary along a position angle of 120°±20°. The preliminary orbital period for the pair is 11.4 years, and the semimajor axis is at least 70 mas. The orbit is highly inclined to the line of sight from the Earth.
