= Iota1 Fornacis =

Yellow/orange giant; Fornax

Iota^{1} Fornacis
Observation data Epoch J2000 Equinox J2000
- Constellation: Fornax
- Right ascension: 02^{h} 36^{m} 09.26479^{s}
- Declination: −30° 02′ 41.9220″
- Apparent magnitude (V): 5.729

Characteristics
- Evolutionary stage: giant
- Spectral type: G8/K0III
- Variable type: microvariable

Astrometry
Radial velocity (R_{v})	3.44±0.12 km/s
Proper motion (μ)	RA: −17.457 mas/yr Dec.: −6.236 mas/yr
Parallax (π)	5.0717±0.0459 mas
Distance	643 ± 6 ly (197 ± 2 pc)

Details
Mass	3.73±0.14 M_{☉}
Radius	18.95±0.48 R_{☉}
Luminosity	193±6 L_{☉}
Surface gravity (log g)	2.46±0.11 cgs
Temperature	4,942±50 K
Metallicity [Fe/H]	0.096±0.043 dex

Other designations
- Iota1 For, CD−30 958, HD 16307, HIP 12122, HR 767, SAO 193795, PPM 278116, TIC 122541607, TYC 7011-475-1, IRAS 02340-3015, 2MASS J02360927-3002418

Database references
SIMBAD	data

Iota^{1} Fornacis is a single sixth-magnitude star in the constellation Fornax. It has a spectrum of G8/K0III, matching a G/K-type giant. Parallax measurements imply a distance of 197 parsecs (640 ly), and it is drifting further away at a speed of 3.44 km/s.

This star is microvariable, varying by 0.0006 magnitudes at Hipparcos wavelengths.
