= Iota2 Fornacis =

Star in the constellation Fornax

Iota^{2} Fornacis
Observation data Epoch J2000.0 Equinox J2000.0 (ICRS)
- Constellation: Fornax
- Right ascension: 02^{h} 38^{m} 18.66152^{s}
- Declination: −30° 11′ 38.6284″
- Apparent magnitude (V): 5.83 + 13.74

Characteristics
- Spectral type: F6 V Fe-0.7 CH-0.4
- B−V color index: +0.48

Astrometry
Radial velocity (R_{v})	29.0±2.9 km/s
Proper motion (μ)	RA: +97.59 mas/yr Dec.: −74.25 mas/yr
Parallax (π)	29.46±0.40 mas
Distance	111 ± 2 ly (33.9 ± 0.5 pc)
Absolute magnitude (M_{V})	3.08

Details

ι For A
Mass	1.42 M_{☉}
Radius	1.4 R_{☉}
Surface gravity (log g)	3.47 cgs
Temperature	6,366 K
Metallicity [Fe/H]	−0.41 dex
Rotational velocity (v sin i)	4.7±0.2 km/s
Age	3.67 Gyr

ι For B
Mass	0.35 M_{☉}

Other designations
- ι For, CD−30°973, HD 16538, HIP 12288, HR 777, SAO 193829

Database references
SIMBAD	data

Iota^{2} Fornacis is the Bayer designation for a star in the southern constellation of Fornax. It is faintly visible to the naked eye on a dark night, having an apparent visual magnitude of 5.83. The distance to this star, based upon an annual parallax shift of 29.46 mas, is around 111 light-years. It is a member of the thin disk population of the Milky Way galaxy.

This is an F-type main-sequence star with a stellar classification of F6 V Fe-0.7 CH-0.4. The suffix notation indicates that absorption lines of iron and the carbon–hydrogen G-band are abnormally weak. It has an estimated 1.42 times the mass of the Sun and 1.4 times the Sun's radius. The star is around 3.67 billion years old, and is spinning with a leisurely projected rotational velocity of 4.7 km/s.

Iota^{2} Fornacis has a common proper motion companion, a magnitude 13.74 star at a position angle of 81.80 arcseconds along a position angle of 6°. This object has about 35% of the Sun's mass.
