= Fornax in Chinese astronomy =

According to traditional Chinese uranography, the modern constellation Fornax is located within the western quadrant of the sky, The White Tiger of the West (西方白虎, Xī Fāng Bái Hǔ).

The name of the western constellation in modern Chinese is 天爐座 (tiān lú zuò), meaning "the heaven furnace constellation".

== Stars ==
The map of Chinese constellation in constellation Fornax area consists of :

Four Symbols	Mansion (Chinese name)	Romanization	Translation	Asterisms (Chinese name)	Romanization	Translation	Western star name	Proper Name	Chinese star name	Romanization	Translation
The White Tiger of the West (西方白虎)	婁	Lóu	Bond	天庾	Tiānyǔ	Ricks of Grain					
The White Tiger of the West (西方白虎)	婁	Lóu	Bond	天庾	Tiānyǔ	Ricks of Grain	ν For		天庾一	Tiānyǔyī	1st star
The White Tiger of the West (西方白虎)	婁	Lóu	Bond	天庾	Tiānyǔ	Ricks of Grain	ω For		天庾二	Tiānyǔèr	2nd star
The White Tiger of the West (西方白虎)	婁	Lóu	Bond	天庾	Tiānyǔ	Ricks of Grain	β For		天庾三	Tiānyǔsān	3rd star
The White Tiger of the West (西方白虎)	昴	Mǎo	Hairy Head	天苑	Tiānyuàn	Celestial Meadows	α For	Dalim (for component A)	天苑增三	Tiānyǔzēngsān	3rd additional star

== See also ==
- Traditional Chinese star names
- Chinese constellations
