= NGC 1375 =

Galaxy in the constellation Fornax

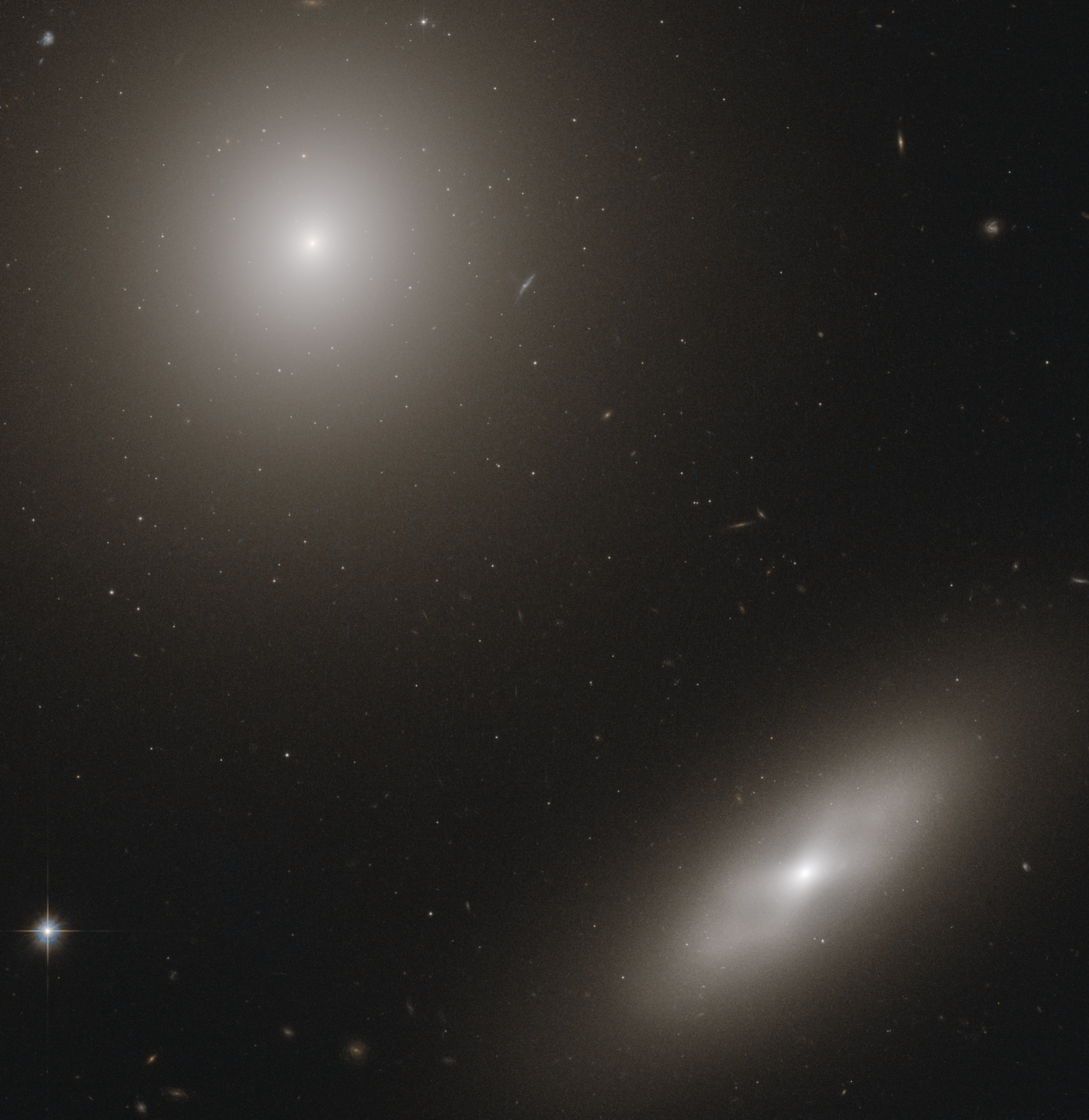
- Hubble Space Telescope image of NGC 1375 (down) and NGC 1374 (up)

Observation data (J2000 epoch)
- Constellation: Fornax
- Right ascension: 03^{h} 35.16^{m}
- Declination: −35° 13′
- Redshift: 643 km/s
- Distance: 8.5 megaparsecs (28 Mly)
- Apparent magnitude (V): 12.2

Characteristics
- Type: SB0 pec
- Apparent size (V): 2.3′ × 0.9′ (23 000 light-years in diameter)
- Notable features: Boxy-shaped bulge

Other designations
- MCG -06-08-030, PGC 13266

NGC 1375 is a barred lenticular galaxy in the constellation Fornax discovered by John Herschel on November 29, 1837.

== Distance and diameter estimates ==
It is at an estimated distance of 28 million light years. This distance is calculated from its estimated recession velocity, the lowest one in the entire Fornax Cluster, about 643 km/s. This led to uncertainties about its membership in the Fornax Cluster and also means that it is uncertain whether it forms a pair with another nearby galaxy in the night sky, NGC 1374. NGC 1375 may be a foreground galaxy that has nothing to do with the Fornax Cluster.

NGC 1375 is a member of the NGC 1386 Group, which also includes NGC 1386, NGC 1389 and NGC 1396, galaxies with similar uncertainties in distance. Its position in the night sky is near the center of the cluster and central galaxy NGC 1399, while the closest galaxy after NGC 1374, outside the pair, is NGC 1373. NGC 1375's size in the night sky is 2.3′ x 0.9′ which, with the galaxy's distance, gives a diameter of 23,000 light-years.

== Classification ==
NGC 1375 is an early-type galaxy with a Hubble classification of SB0 pec, indicating it is a barred lenticular galaxy.

Despite their name, early-type galaxies are much older than spiral galaxies, and mostly comprise old, red-colored stars. Very little star formation occurs in these galaxies; the lack of star formation in elliptical galaxies appears to start at the center and then slowly propagates outward. This is an early-type lenticular galaxy, with a similar nature to early-type ellipticals.

== Boxy bulge ==
This galaxy contains a boxy bulge. It is one of the few lenticular galaxies containing such a bulge; another is NGC 1175. Boxy bulges have been found in mostly edge-on galaxies to date. The origin of this bulge is unknown. However, recent studies show they are not possible only for edge-on galaxies but for galaxies with an inclination of less than 70°, of type S0 and Sb, like NGC 1532, also in the Fornax Cluster. Boxy bulges found in other galaxies with much less inclination include those of barred spiral galaxies NGC 3049 and IC 676.
