= NGC 1036 =

Magellanic spiral Galaxy in the constellation Aries

- NGC 1036 seen by DESI Legacy Surveys

Observation data (J2000 epoch)
- Constellation: Aries
- Right ascension: 02^{h} 40^{m} 29.0010^{s}
- Declination: +19° 17′ 49.585″
- Redshift: 0.002521
- Heliocentric radial velocity: 790 km/s
- Distance: 9.635 ± 1.565 Megaparsec
- Apparent magnitude (B): 13.5
- Absolute magnitude (V): -17.67
- Absolute magnitude (B): -17.23
- Surface brightness: 23.07 mag/arcsec^{2}
- Magnitude (J): 11.481
- Magnitude (H): 10.883
- Magnitude (K): 10.663

Characteristics
- Type: Sm D pec?
- Size: 4.78 kiloparsec
- Apparent size (V): 90″ × 66″
- Half-light radius (physical): 1.22-1.26 kiloparsec

Other designations
- IC 1828, UGC 02160, Mrk 0370, CGCG 462-041, GC 583, JH 247, WH III 475, PGC 10127

NGC 1036 is a diffuse, magellanic spiral galaxy in the constellation of Aries. It was discovered by William Herschel on November 29, 1785 as NGC 1036 and was rediscovered by Stéphane Javelle on January 18, 1898 as IC 1828. John Louis Emil Dreyer noted it as faint, small, round, a little brighter middle. NGC 1036 is also known as Markarian 370.

== Properties ==
NGC 1036 has a stellar mass of 0.83 × 10^{9} M⊙ and a neutral hydrogen (H I) mass of 0.29 × 10^{9} M⊙. It has a star formation rate (SFR) 1.454 × 10^{-2} M_{⊙} yr^{-1}, and a foreground Galactic reddening (E(B-V)) of 0.0794. Another survey using Wide-field Infrared Survey Explorer (WISE) band 4 found that NGC 1036 has a logSFR of -1.39 ± 0.20 M_{⊙} yr^{-1}, a (J−H) of 0.61 ± 0.04 and a (H−K) of 0.26 ± 0.06.

NGC 1036 has a 1.4 GHz radio continuum flux of 6.1 mJy and its overall energy source classification is consistent with a star-forming galaxy with a H II nucleus. NGC 1036 has an integrated H I flux density of 8.66 ± 0.08 Jy km/s and an Hβ emission of 1 and a O/H of 1.5 ×10^{-4}. Detections revealed that NGC 1036 has a far-infrared emission (S_{60u}) of 1.12 Jy and an upper limit was placed for its 1.4 GHz radio continuum emission (S_{1410}).

NGC 1036 has a total B-band apparent magnitude ($B^E_{LSB, \infin}$) of 13.93 ± 0.05 mag, a total R-band apparent magnitude ($R^E_{LSB, \infin}$) of 12.61 ± 0.13 mag, an extinction-corrected B−R color index (derived from sersic curve) ($(B-R)^{S, c}_{LSB}$) of 1.30 ± 0.13 mag and an extinction-corrected B−R color index (derived from exponential) ($(B-R)^{E, c}_{LSB}$) of 1.31 ± 0.13 mag. NGC 1036 has an ellipticity of 0.26, an inclination of 44° and a velocity-integrated CO(1-0) line intensity of 0.87 ± 0.17 K km s⁻¹ and a maximum rotational velocity of 83.8 km s⁻¹.

== Characteristics ==
NGC 1036 is classified as a blue compact dwarf and irregular bright core with a smooth elliptical outer low surface brightness envelope (iE). NGC 1036 has a confirmed Low Surface Brightness Underlying Component (LBUC). NGC 1036 has a stellar mass-to-light ratio of 1.12 (M_{⊙}/L_{⊙}). NGC 1036 is found not to host an active galactic nucleus. Evolutionary modeling of NGC 1036 host and starburst colors indicates that the galaxy evolved through star formation over 13 billion years, separated by quiet periods of 0.1 to 1.3 Gyr.

The Spectrophotometric Population Synthesis Library for Old Stellar Systems by Vazdekis et al. (1996) suggested NGC 1036's host disk has a stellar population with ages between 4–7 Gyr, while the active starburst knots have ages between 3 to 6 million years. Long-slit spectroscopy by Isaac Newton Telescope identified a total of 16 star-forming knots throughout the galaxy NGC 1036. Some of the star-forming knots have luminosities similar to Giant H II regions in Triangulum Galaxy and Large Magellanic Cloud.

NGC 1036 is found to have double nuclei. The "double nuclei" were found to be two luminous starburst regions, Mrk 370a located at the optical center of Mrk 370, while Mrk 370b is found southeast of the central source at an almost 90° angle to the major axis Mrk 370b. Mrk 370a has an Hα flux of 2.11 × 10⁻¹³ erg s⁻¹ cm⁻², while Mrk 370b has an Hα flux of 3.66 × 10⁻¹⁴ erg s⁻¹ cm⁻²). Mrk 370a and Mrk 370b have a projected separation (rp) of 0.2 kiloparsec and a relative velocity difference of 40 ± 28 km/s.

== Environment ==
NGC 1036 is located near the Tau Void at 18.8 Mpc (not to be confused with the more distant Taurus Void) and has no nearby neighboring galaxies. NGC 1036 is located in the same field as NGC 1023 Group.

== Supernova ==
- MASTER OT J024034.26+191700.1 is an unconfirmed supernova candidate with an optical transient (m_{OT}) of 16.9, discovered by MASTER-IAC.

== See also ==
- NGC 1029
- NGC 1024
- NGC 990
