= IC 1816 =

Galaxy in the constellation Fornax

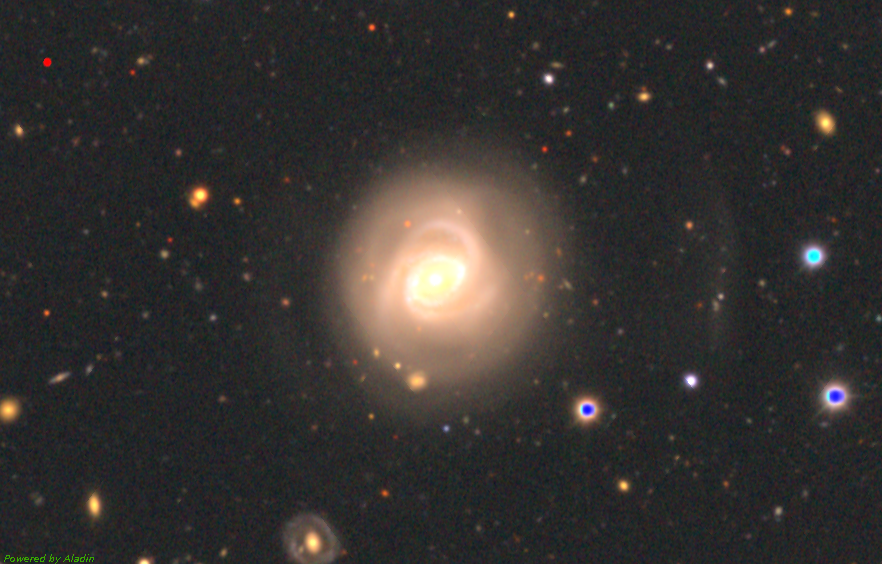
- IC 1816 imaged by Dark Energy Survey.

Observation data (J2000 epoch)
- Constellation: Fornax
- Right ascension: 02^{h} 31^{m} 50.97^{s}
- Declination: −36° 40′ 19.64″
- Redshift: 0.016945 ± 0.000020
- Heliocentric radial velocity: 5,080 km/s
- Distance: 245 Mly
- Apparent magnitude (V): 13.1

Characteristics
- Type: SB(r)ab pec?
- Size: ~136,000 ly (41.7 kpc) (estimated)

Other designations
- ESO 355-G025, MCG -06-06-011, AM 0229-365, IRAS 02297-3653, 6dF J0231510-364019, PGC 9634

IC 1816 is a barred spiral galaxy located in the constellation of Fornax. The galaxy is located 245 million light-years from Earth and has a diameter of approximately 136,000 light-years across. It was first discovered by Lewis Swift on 12 October 1896, who classified it as a small faint round object.

== Description ==
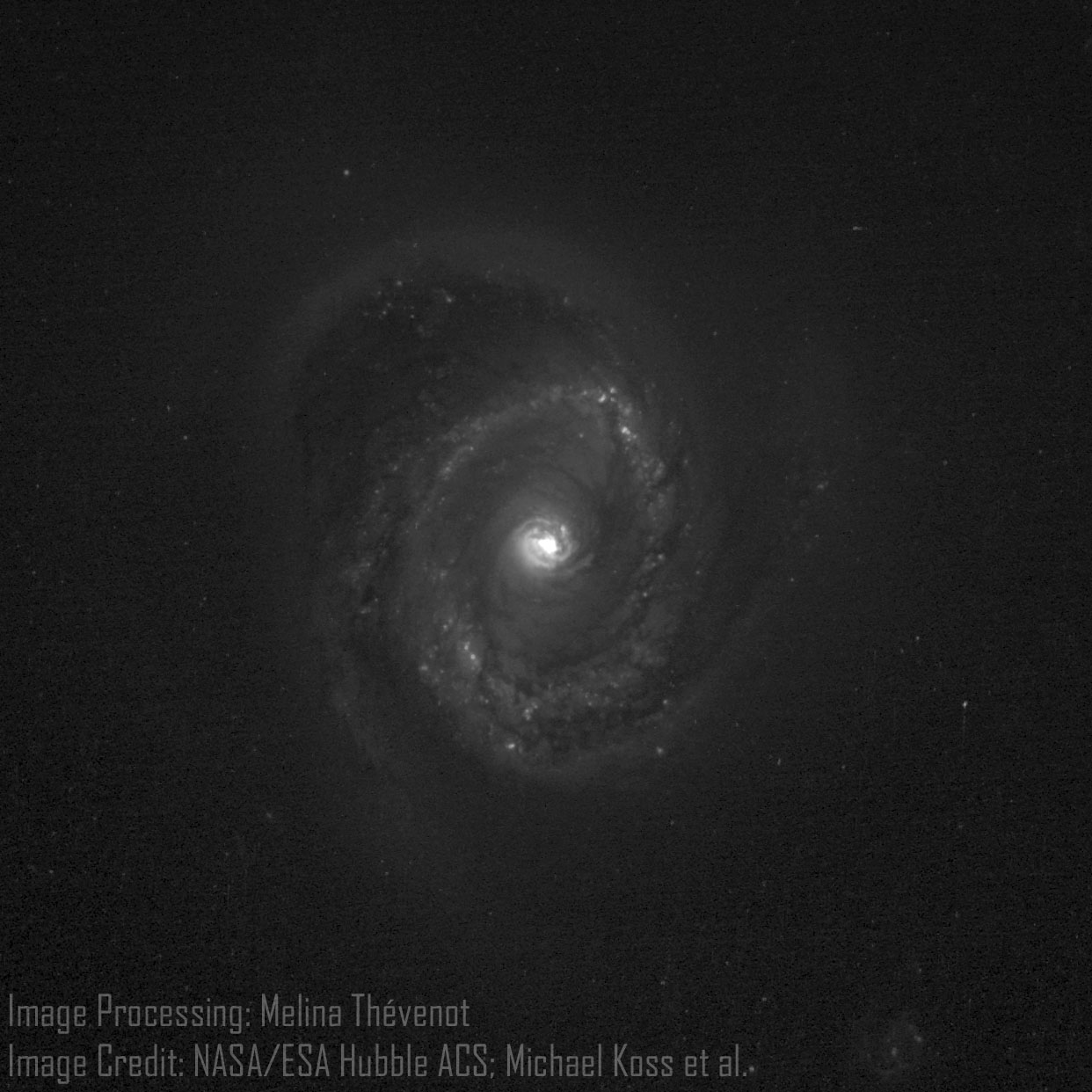
Hubble image of IC 1816

IC 1816 is an isolated face-on spiral galaxy. It has three spiral arms with the northwest arm, the brightest and most detached. Two of the arms are distinctive and seem to open up as its spiral structure travels inwards. The galaxy also shows a prominent curved dust lane. There is a clearly resolved ring and a smaller elongated structure interpreted as a nuclear bar. An inner bar might be present given the observation of a small counter-rotation located from its nucleus although a nuclear disk is suggested. The star formation rate for IC 1816 is estimated to be 0.74 M_{☉} per year.

The nucleus of IC 1816 is active. It was originally classified as a type 1 Seyfert galaxy but later reclassified as a type 2 Seyfert galaxy due to it lacking broad emission lines. The Seyfert spectrum of the galaxy is found extending as far as 3.4 arcseconds east from the nucleus. A hydrogen alpha component is seen broadening, likely caused by the blending of nitrogen lines.

IC 1816 has an extended narrow line region showing highly ionized gas, indicated by the presence of coronal line emission, with the region mainly centering in its star-forming ring. The gas located in its nuclear region is mainly blueshifted with a peak velocity dispersion of 320 kilometers per second, suggesting the active galactic nucleus of the galaxy is powered through outflows.
