= NGC 986 =

Barred spiral galaxy in the constellation Fornax

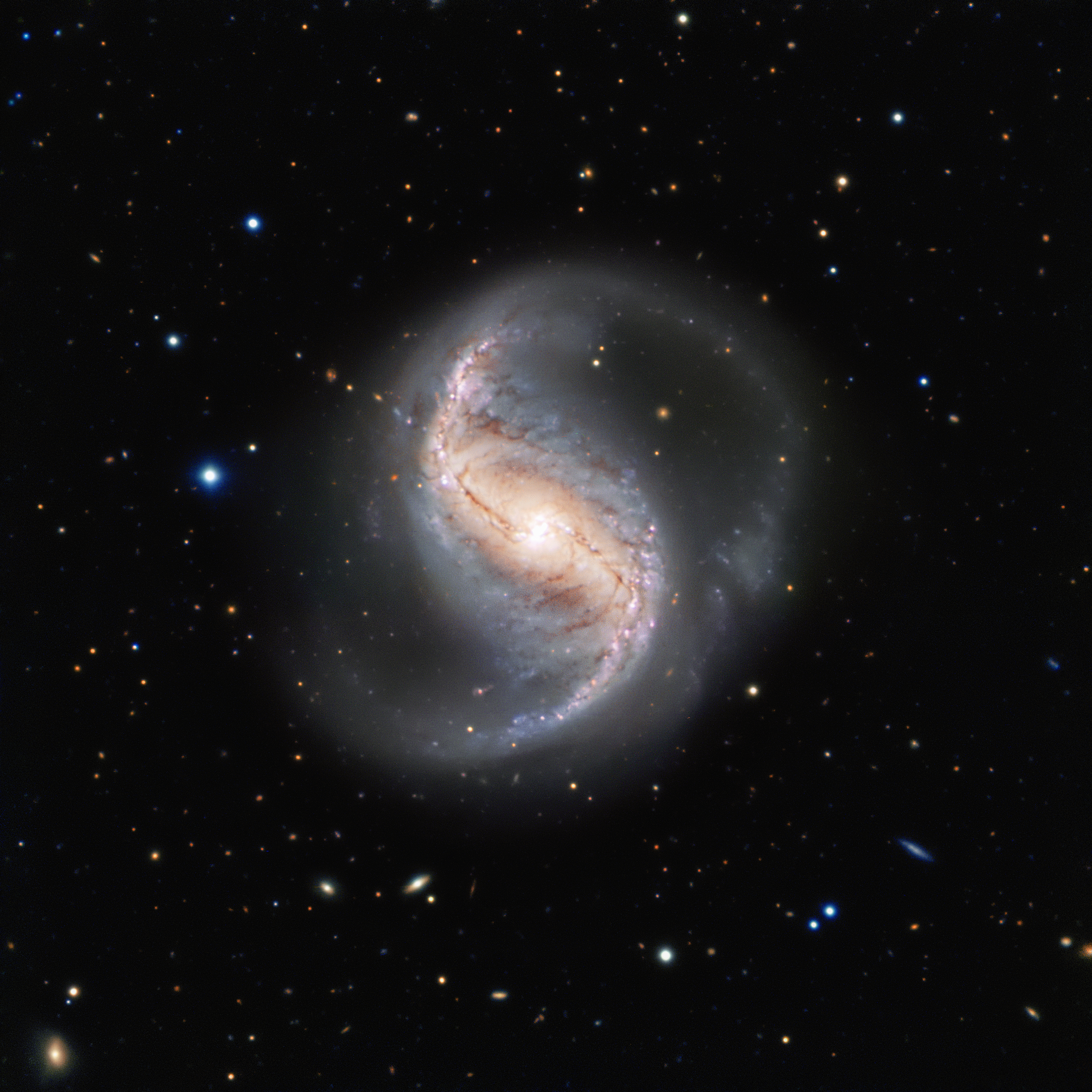
- NGC 986 taken by the FORS instrument on ESO’s VLT.

Observation data (J2000 epoch)
- Constellation: Fornax
- Right ascension: 02^{h} 33^{m} 34.349^{s}
- Declination: −39° 02′ 42.21″
- Redshift: 0.006606
- Heliocentric radial velocity: 1,942±10 km/s
- Distance: 76 Mly (23.2 Mpc); 56 million ly
- Group or cluster: Fornax Cluster
- Apparent magnitude (V): 10.9
- Apparent magnitude (B): 11.74

Characteristics
- Type: (R′_{1})SB(rs)b
- Apparent size (V): 3′.8 × 1′.9

Other designations
- ESO 299-7, HIPASS J0233-39, NVSS J023334-390237, IRAS 02315-3915, 2MASX J02333434-3902422, NGC 986, LEDA 9747, MCG -07-06-015

NGC 986 is a barred spiral galaxy in the southern constellation of Fornax, located about 76 million light-years away. It was discovered on August 5, 1826, by the Scottish astronomer James Dunlop, who described it as a "faint nebula, of an irregular round figure". The galaxy has an angular size of 3′.8 × 1′.9 with a visual magnitude of 10.9. It belongs to the Fornax Cluster of galaxies. This galaxy has a nearby companion, NGC 986A, at an angular separation of 17′, corresponding to a projected separation of 110 kpc. The two appear unconnected.

The morphological class of NGC 986 is (R′_{1})SB(rs)b, indicating this is a barred spiral (SB) with an outer pseudo-ring (R′_{1}), an incomplete inner ring (rs), and moderately wound spiral arms (b). The galactic plane is inclined at an angle of 37° to the line of sight from the Earth. The resulting ellipsoidal profile has its major axis aligned along a position angle of 127°.

The nucleus of NGC 986 is undergoing intense star formation and there is an H II region at the core. The large central bar extends ~14 kpc and is rich in dense gas. The galaxy contains two large, extended and slightly warped arms that begin at each end of the central bar, forming an S-shape. There may be a tidally-disrupted dwarf galaxy at the end of its northern arm.

== Supernova ==
One supernova has been observed in NGC 986: SN 2018lei (Type Ic, mag. 16.8) was discovered by ASAS-SN on 31 December 2018.
