= NGC 824 =

Galaxy in the constellation Fornax

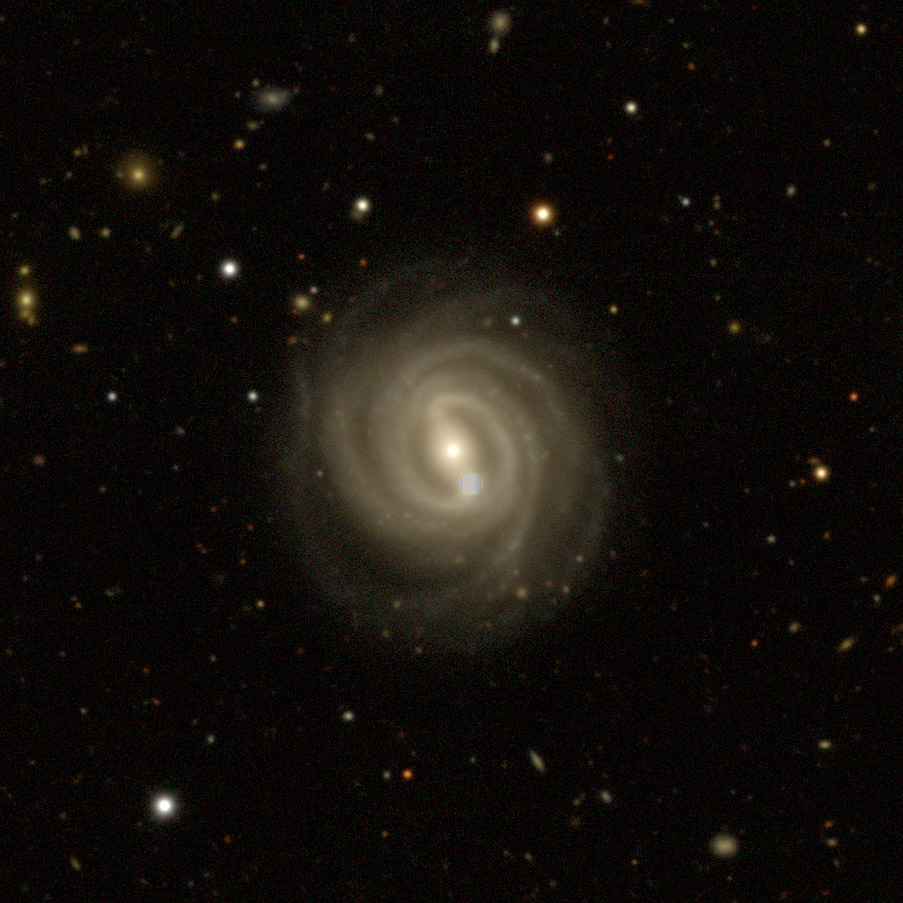
- DECam image of NGC 824

Observation data (J2000 epoch)
- Constellation: Fornax
- Right ascension: 02^{h} 06^{m} 53.25064^{s}
- Declination: −36° 27′ 11.4880″
- Redshift: 0.01931
- Heliocentric radial velocity: 5733 km/s
- Distance: 257.5 Mly (78.94 Mpc)
- Apparent magnitude (B): 14.14

Characteristics
- Type: SB(r)bc

Other designations
- MCG -06-05-028, PGC 8068

NGC 824 is a barred spiral galaxy located in the constellation Fornax about 260 million light-years from the Milky Way. It was discovered by British astronomer John Herschel in 1837.

== See also ==
- List of NGC objects (1–1000)
