= NGC 1387 =

Galaxy in the constellation Fornax

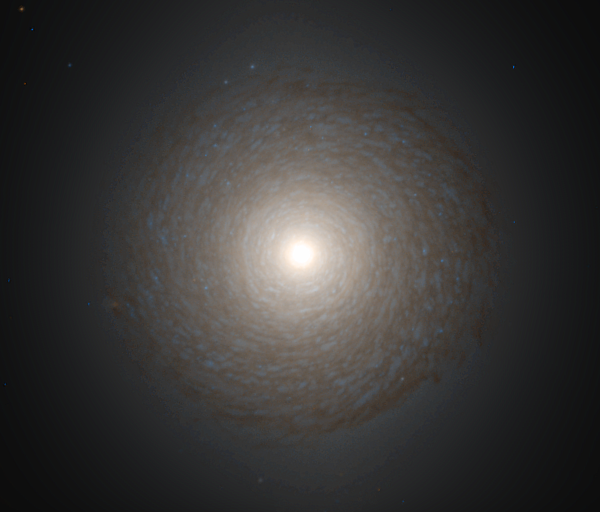
- Hubble Space Telescope image of NGC 1387

Observation data (J2000 epoch)
- Constellation: Fornax
- Right ascension: 03^{h} 36.57^{m}
- Declination: −35° 30′
- Redshift: 0.004343
- Heliocentric radial velocity: 1296 km/s
- Distance: 53 ± 4 megalight-years (16.2 ± 1.2 Mpc)
- Apparent magnitude (V): 10.8

Characteristics
- Type: (R')SAB(s)0
- Apparent size (V): 2.80′ × 2.6′ (45 000 light-years)

Other designations
- 2MASX J03365707-3530240, ESO 358-036, GC 744, h 2564, IRAS 03350-3540, MCG -6-9-7, PGC 13344, SGC 33502-3540.2, FCC 184

NGC 1387 is a lenticular galaxy in the constellation Fornax, in the Fornax Cluster. It was discovered by William Herschel on December 25, 1835.

At a distance of 53 million light-years, it is one of the closer members of the Fornax Cluster. It has a magnitude of 10.8, which makes NGC 1387 one of the brighter galaxies in the Fornax Cluster and it is 60 000 light-years across. It is only 12 arcminutes from the central galaxy NGC 1399, which makes it one of the closest galaxies to NGC 1399.

NGC 1387 is an early-type galaxy with a Hubble classification of (R')SAB(s)0. It has a clear, normal-looking non-ansae type bar embedded in a very extensive envelope, which is structureless except for the bar. Observations in 2006 discovered a large nuclear ring around NGC 1387, in a bulge-subtracted 2.2 micron image. Despite their name, early-type galaxies are much older than spiral galaxies, and mostly comprise old, red-colored stars. Very little star formation occurs in these galaxies; the lack of star formation in elliptical galaxies appears to start at the center and then slowly propagates outward. This is an early-type lenticular galaxy, with similar nature to early-type elliptical galaxies.

NGC 1387 is rich with globular clusters, with an estimated number of clusters of 390 ± 27. However, unlike similar galaxies NGC 1374 and NGC 1379, which have an almost equal number of blue and red globular clusters, NGC 1387's globular cluster system is mostly composed of red globular clusters, with only a small fraction of blue globular clusters. This may be caused by gravitational interactions with the massive central galaxy NGC 1399, which probably stripped off most of the globular clusters from NGC 1387. The globular clusters of NGC 1387, like globulars in NGC 1379 and NGC 1374, did not show any evidence of multiple populations.
