= GS-NDG-9422 =

Galaxy

Observation data
- Constellation: Fornax
- Right ascension: 03^{h} 32^{m} 36.89^{s}
- Declination: −27° 46′ 49.33″
- Redshift: 5.943

GS-NDG-9422 is a nebular dominated galaxy in the constellation Fornax that was discovered by NASA’s James Webb Space Telescope. Scientists assume that the galaxy's light comes mostly from superheated gas (more than 80 000 degrees Celsius).
