= NGC 1379 =

Galaxy in the constellation Fornax

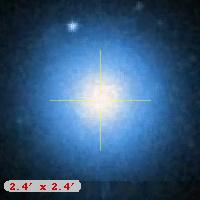
- Optical image of NGC 1379

Observation data (J2000 epoch)
- Constellation: Fornax
- Right ascension: 03^{h} 36.38^{m}
- Declination: −35° 26′
- Redshift: 1324 ± 2 km/s
- Distance: 18.4 megaparsecs (60 Mly)
- Apparent magnitude (V): 10.9

Characteristics
- Type: E0
- Apparent size (V): 2.6′ × 2.5′ (50 000 light-years in diameter)
- Notable features: low-luminosity elliptical galaxy

Other designations
- ESO 358-27, MCG -6-9-1, PGC 13299

NGC 1379 is a low-luminosity elliptical galaxy in the southern constellation Fornax. It was discovered by William Herschel on December 25, 1835.

At a distance of 60 million light-years, it is one of the closer members of the Fornax Cluster. It is located about 24' from the central galaxy, NGC 1399. NGC 1387 is the closest galaxy, and it is in the foreground of NGC 1379. Both are located in central part of the Fornax Cluster.

NGC 1379 has a Hubble classification of E0. It is also an early-type galaxy, like most other elliptical galaxies in the Fornax Cluster. Its size on the night sky is 2.6' x 2.5' which is, combined with the estimated distance, proportional to its real size of 50,000 light-years.

Despite their name, early-type galaxies are much older than spiral galaxies, and mostly comprise old, red-colored stars. Very little star formation occurs in these galaxies; the lack of star formation in elliptical galaxies appears to start at the center and then slowly propagates outward.

It has a modest cluster population for a galaxy of its size, with the number of clusters estimated at 225 ± 23. There are blue and red globular clusters, although red globulars are more populous than blue ones. This trend is also seen in NGC 1374, and in NGC 1387, which have only a small fraction of blue globular clusters. This galaxy has an almost equal number of red and blue. These globular clusters, like globulars in NGC 1374 and NGC 1387, do not show any evidence of multiple populations.
