= NGC 1029 =

Lenticular galaxy in the constellation Aries

- NGC 1029 seen by Pan-STARRS

Observation data (J2000 epoch)
- Constellation: Aries
- Right ascension: 02^{h} 39^{m} 36.5522^{s}
- Declination: +10° 47′ 35.698″
- Redshift: 0.012125
- Heliocentric radial velocity: 3620 km/s
- Distance: 37.3 Megaparsec
- Group or cluster: LGG 69
- Apparent magnitude (V): 13.11
- Apparent magnitude (B): 14.20
- Absolute magnitude (V): −21.55
- Absolute magnitude (B): −20.75
- Magnitude (J): 10.624
- Magnitude (H): 9.934
- Magnitude (K): 9.628

Characteristics
- Type: S0/a
- Size: 21.77 kiloparsec
- Half-light radius (apparent): 2 arcseconds

Other designations
- UGC 02149, CGCG 439-024, CGCG 0236.9+1035, MCG +02-07-024, LEDA 10078, GC 5270, Marth 73

NGC 1029 is a lenticular galaxy in the constellation Aries. NGC 1029 was discovered by Albert Marth on October 1, 1864. John Louis Emil Dreyer described it as "faint, small and much extended". It is 37.3 megaparsecs away from Earth. NGC 1029 is located in an isolated triplet of galaxies.

== Properties ==
NGC 1029 does not host an active galactic nucleus. A survey conducted by the Green Bank Telescope found a total neutral hydrogen (H I) mass (M_{HI}) of (5.19 ± 0.09) × 10^{9} M_{☉} and an integrated H I flux of 8.32 ± 0.15 Jy km s^{-1}. It has an estimated total log_{10}(M_{*}/M_{☉}) of 10.63 ± 0.10 M_{☉}, a stellar mass-to-light ratio of 0.50 M_{☉}/L_{☉} and a log_{10}star formation rate (SFR) of −1.36 ± 0.23.

NGC 1029 has a photometric inclination angle (i_{phot}) of 90°, indicating it is an edge-on galaxy. It has a luminosity weighed mean stellar age (T (Gyr)) of 10 ± 2 and a metallicity [Z/H] of +0.4, indicating that NGC 1029 has an old stellar population and a super-solar disc.

== Galaxy Group ==
NGC 1029 is part of the galaxy group known as LGG 69. It consists of three members, namely NGC 1024 and NGC 990. In R. Brent Tully's 2MASS Group catalog, NGC 1029 is part of Group 201288, which consist of 3 members, has a group mass of 0.112 × 10^{14} M_{☉} and an observed velocity dispersion (σ_{v}) of 70 km/s.

In the Catalog of Isolated Triplets of Galaxies by Valentina Karachentseva, Igor Karachentsev, and A. L. Shcherbanovsky, NGC 1029 is KTG 9b and has tidal arms, clumpy structure around the disk and additional structure in the outskirts. NGC 1029 is considered to be a pair of galaxies with NGC 1024, known as Mahtessian 43.

In the book by Fritz Zwicky Catalog of Galaxies and of Clusters of Galaxies, NGC 1029 is part of an extended region known as Zwicky 3154, which consists of 144 members. Zwicky 3154 is considered very distant and open. A 1952 photometric study mistakenly listed NGC 1029 as the star cluster NGC 1049 in the Fornax Dwarf. In the WBL catalog, NGC 1029 is part of WBL 82, which consists of 3 members, including NGC 1028 and NGC 1024.
