= IC 1919 =

Elliptical galaxy in the Fornax Cluster

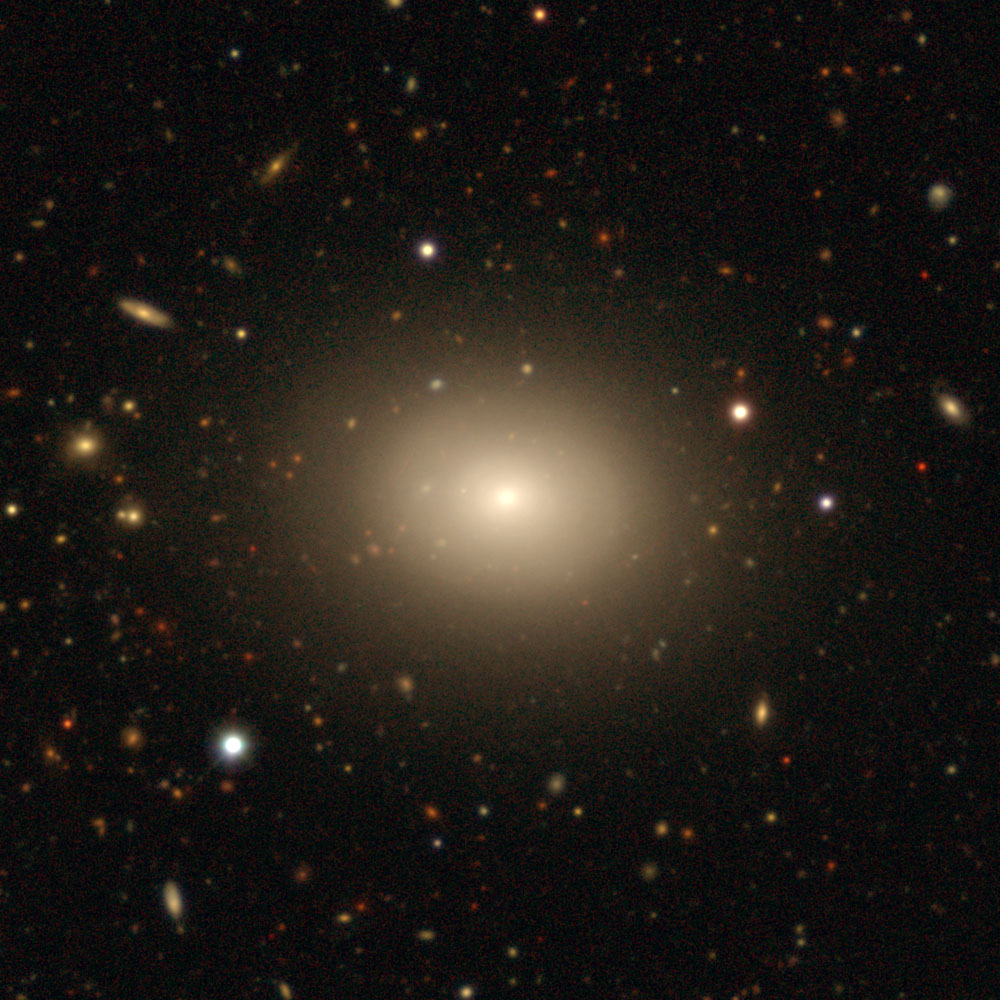
- IC 1919 (Legacy Surveys)

Observation data (J2000 epoch)
- Constellation: Fornax
- Right ascension: 03^{h} 26.2^{m}
- Declination: −32° 53′
- Distance: 18.6 Mpc (60.7 Mly)
- Apparent magnitude (V)

Characteristics
- Type: E
- Apparent size (V): 1.3′ × 1.0′

Other designations
- ESO 358-1, MCG -6-8-15, PGC 12825

IC 1919 is an elliptical galaxy in the constellation of Fornax. It is 61 million light years distant from Earth and it is a member of Fornax Cluster, a cluster of approximately 200 galaxies.

It was discovered by Lewis Swift on November 25, 1897. Its diameter, based on distance and size on night sky, is 23 000 light years, which is only a one quarter or probably less the diameter of Milky Way Galaxy.

== See also ==
- IC 1913
- NGC 1399, central galaxy of Fornax Cluster
- NGC 1427A
