= NGC 1217 =

Galaxy in the constellation Fornax

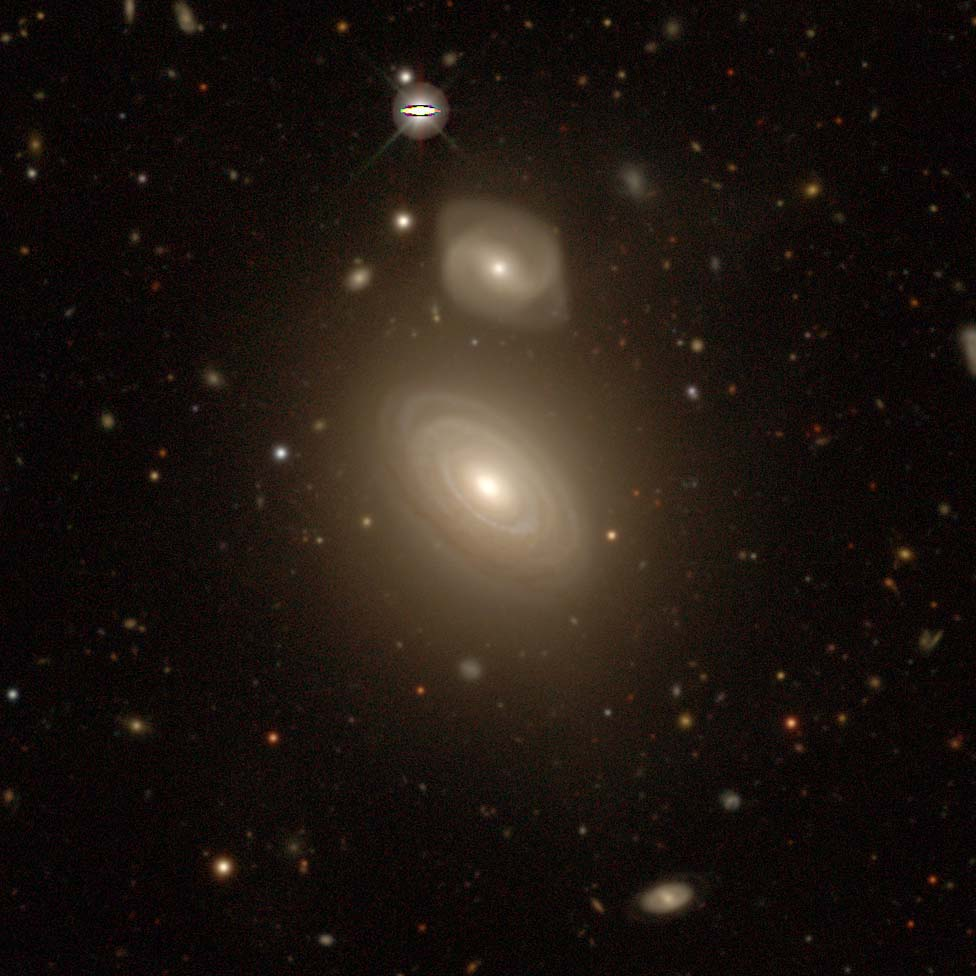
- NGC 1217 (center) imaged by Legacy Surveys. The galaxy above is MCG -07-07-004.

Observation data (J2000 epoch)
- Constellation: Fornax
- Right ascension: 03^{h} 06^{m} 06.0421^{s}
- Declination: −39° 02′ 10.833″
- Redshift: 0.021358±0.0000400
- Heliocentric radial velocity: 6,403±12 km/s
- Distance: 199.93 Mly (61.300 Mpc)
- Apparent magnitude (V): 13.64

Characteristics
- Type: (R)SA(r)a
- Apparent size (V): 1.8′ × 1.3′

Other designations
- ESO 300- G 010, IRAS 03041-3913, 2MASX J03060599-3902111, MCG -07-07-003, PGC 11641

NGC 1217 is a spiral galaxy in the constellation of Fornax. Its velocity with respect to the cosmic microwave background is 6,282±15 km/s, which corresponds to a Hubble distance of 302.2 ± 21.2 Mly (92.66 ± 6.49 Mpc). Additionally, one non-redshift measurement provides a much closer distance estimate of 199.93 Mly (61.300 Mpc). It was discovered by British astronomer John Herschel on 23 October 1835.

NGC 1217 has an active galactic nucleus, i.e. it has a compact region at the center of a galaxy that emits a significant amount of energy across the electromagnetic spectrum, with characteristics indicating that this luminosity is not produced by the stars.

NGC 1217 is also a Seyfert II galaxy, i.e. it has a quasar-like nucleus with very high surface brightnesses whose spectra reveal strong, high-ionisation emission lines, but unlike quasars, the host galaxy is clearly detectable. It is also a LINER galaxy, i.e. a galaxy whose nucleus has an emission spectrum characterized by broad lines of weakly ionized atoms.

== Supernova ==
One supernova has been observed in NGC 1217:

- SN 2025ygq (Type Ia, mag. 18.483) was discovered by ATLAS on 22 September 2025.

== See also ==
- List of NGC objects (1001–2000)
