= NGC 1374 =

Galaxy in the constellation Fornax

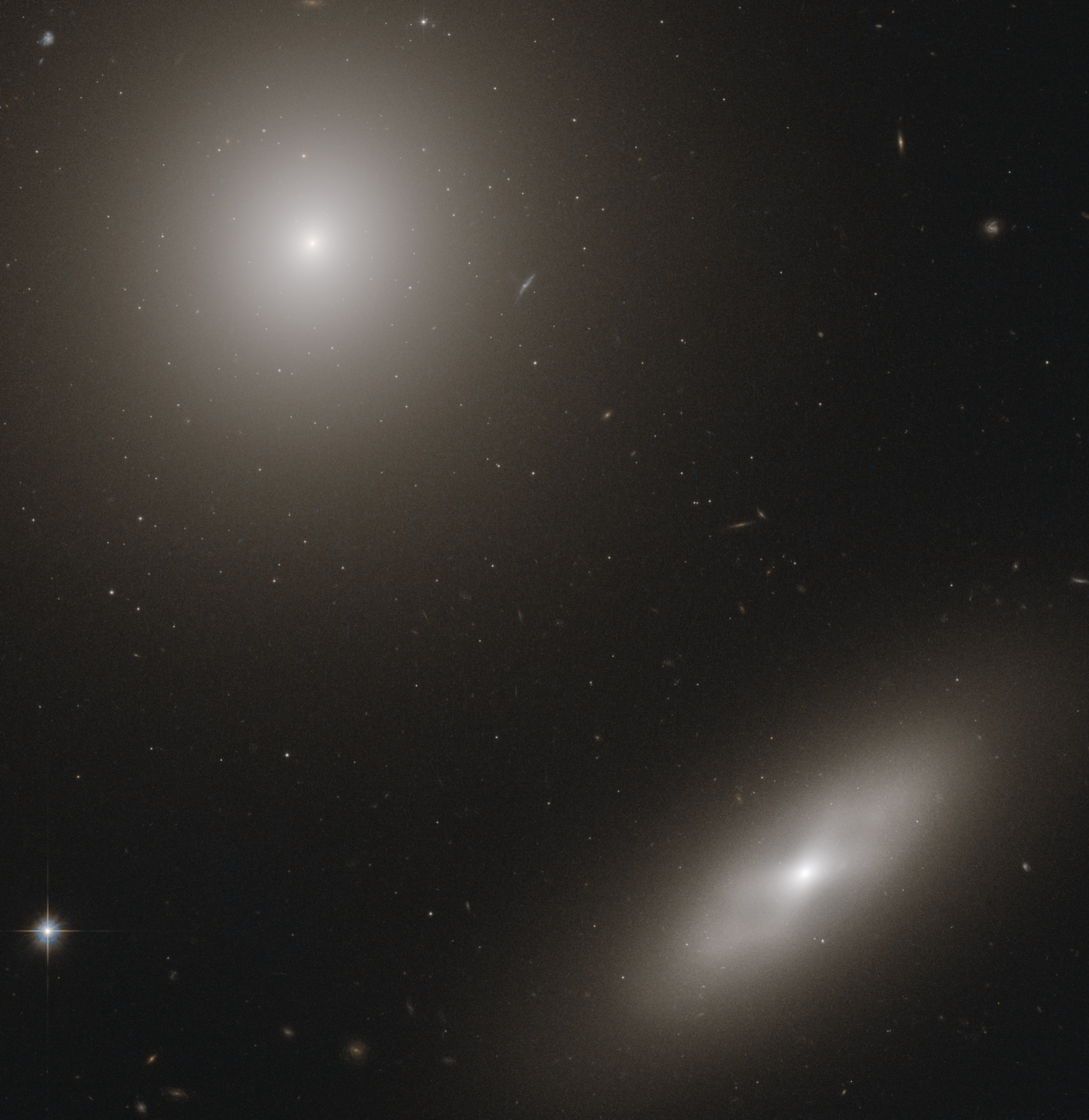
- Hubble Space Telescope image of NGC 1374 (up) and NGC 1375 (down)

Observation data (J2000 epoch)
- Constellation: Fornax
- Right ascension: 03^{h} 35.16^{m}
- Declination: −35° 13′
- Distance: 18.1 Mpc (59 Mly)
- Apparent magnitude (V): 11.0

Characteristics
- Type: E1
- Apparent size (V): 2.7′ × 2.4′ (50 000 light-years in diameter)
- Notable features: low-luminosity elliptical galaxy

Other designations
- MCG -06-08-029, PGC 13267

NGC 1374 is a low-luminosity elliptical galaxy in the southern constellation Fornax. It was discovered by John Herschel on November 29, 1837.

== Location ==
It is at a distance of 59 million light years. The galaxy may form a pair with another nearby galaxy, NGC 1375, but this is uncertain based on the estimated distance of NGC 1375. It is a member of the Fornax Cluster, a cluster of 200 galaxies, and it is positioned near the center of the cluster and central galaxy NGC 1399, while the closest galaxy after NGC 1375, outside the pair, is NGC 1373. NGC 1374's size on the night sky is 2.7′ × 2.4′ which, with the galaxy's distance, gives a diameter of 50,000 light-years.

== Classification ==
NGC 1374 is an early-type galaxy with a Hubble classification of E1, indicating a flattening of 10%, but also it shows a subtle differentiation of light about halfway out of radius, which is indicating transition to S0 classification. It has a bright core surrounded by a soft hazy halo.

Despite their name, early-type galaxies are much older than spiral galaxies, and mostly comprise old, red-colored stars. Very little star formation occurs in these galaxies; the lack of star formation in elliptical galaxies appears to start at the center and then slowly propagates outward.

== Globular clusters ==
NGC 1374 has an estimated globular cluster population of 360 ± 17. There are blue and red globular clusters, although red globulars are more populous than blue ones. A similar trend is present in NGC 1379 and NGC 1387. These globular clusters, like globulars in NGC 1379 and NGC 1387, did not show any evidences of multiple populations.
