= NGC 1360 =

Planetary nebula in the constellation Fornax

Emission nebula
- Planetary nebula
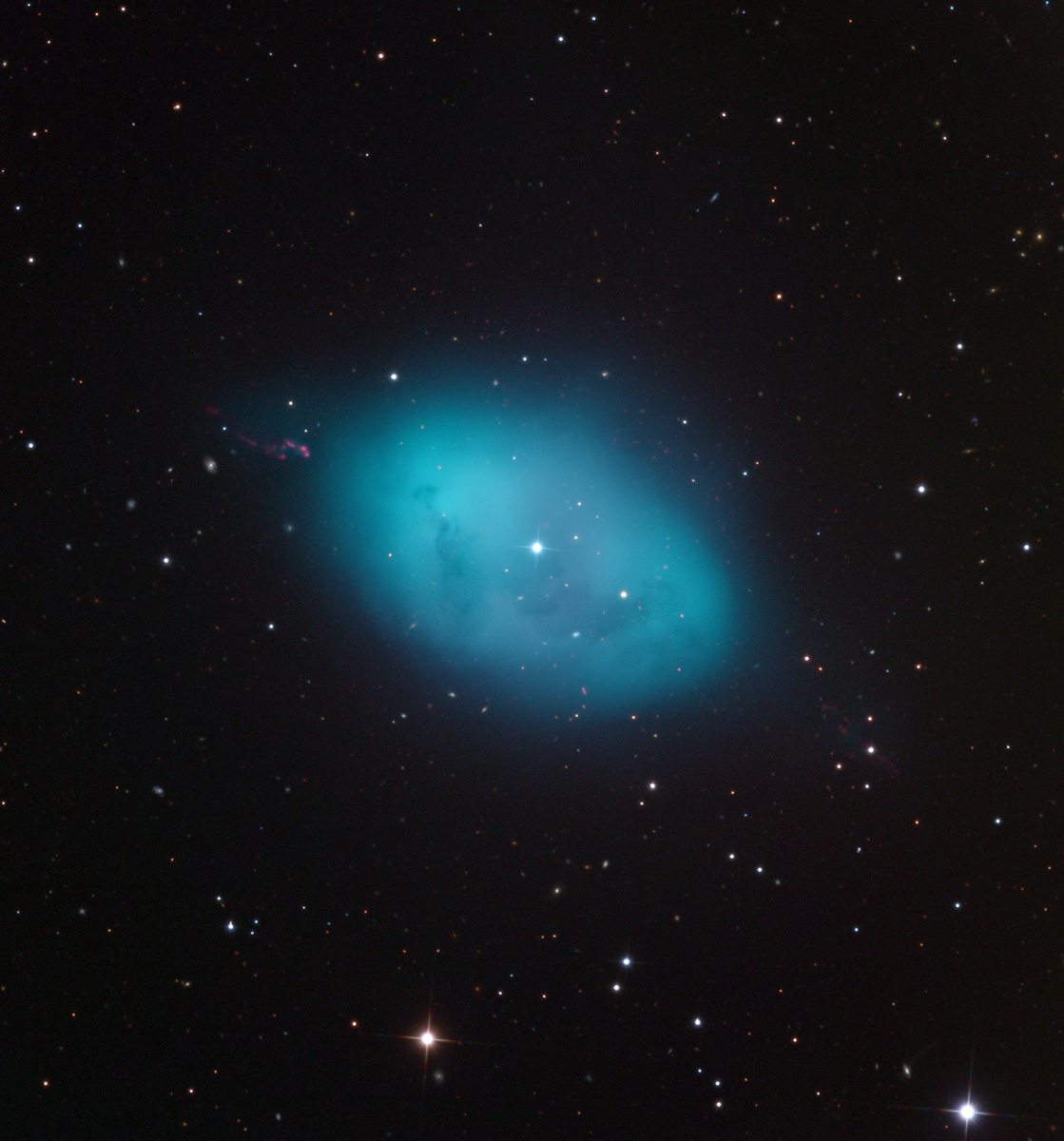
- NGC 1360 as taken by the Mount Lemmon SkyCenter

Observation data: J2000 epoch
- Right ascension: 03^{h} 33^{m} 14.646^{s}
- Declination: −25° 52′ 18.214″
- Distance: 1,145 ly (351 pc); 1,794 ly (550 pc) ly
- Apparent magnitude (V): 9.4
- Apparent dimensions (V): 11.0 × 7.5 arcmin
- Constellation: Fornax
- Notable features: 11.4v magnitude central star
- Designations: PK220-53.1, ESO 482-PN007, AM 0331-260, GC 5315, PN G220.3-53.9, CD-26 1339

NGC 1360, also known as the Comet Planetary Nebula or Robin's Egg Nebula, is a planetary nebula in the constellation of Fornax. It was identified as a planetary nebula due to its strong radiation in the OIII (oxygen) bands. Reddish matter, believed to have been ejected from the original star before its final collapse, is visible in images. It is slightly fainter than IC 2003.

The central star of the system was suspected to be binary since 1977, but was only confirmed in 2017. The central source consists of a low-mass O-type star and a white dwarf, with masses of 0.555 M_{☉} and 0.679 M_{☉} respectively.

NGC 1360 was discovered in January 1868 by the German astronomer Friedrich August Theodor Winnecke.
