= NGC 1373 =

Galaxy in the constellation Fornax

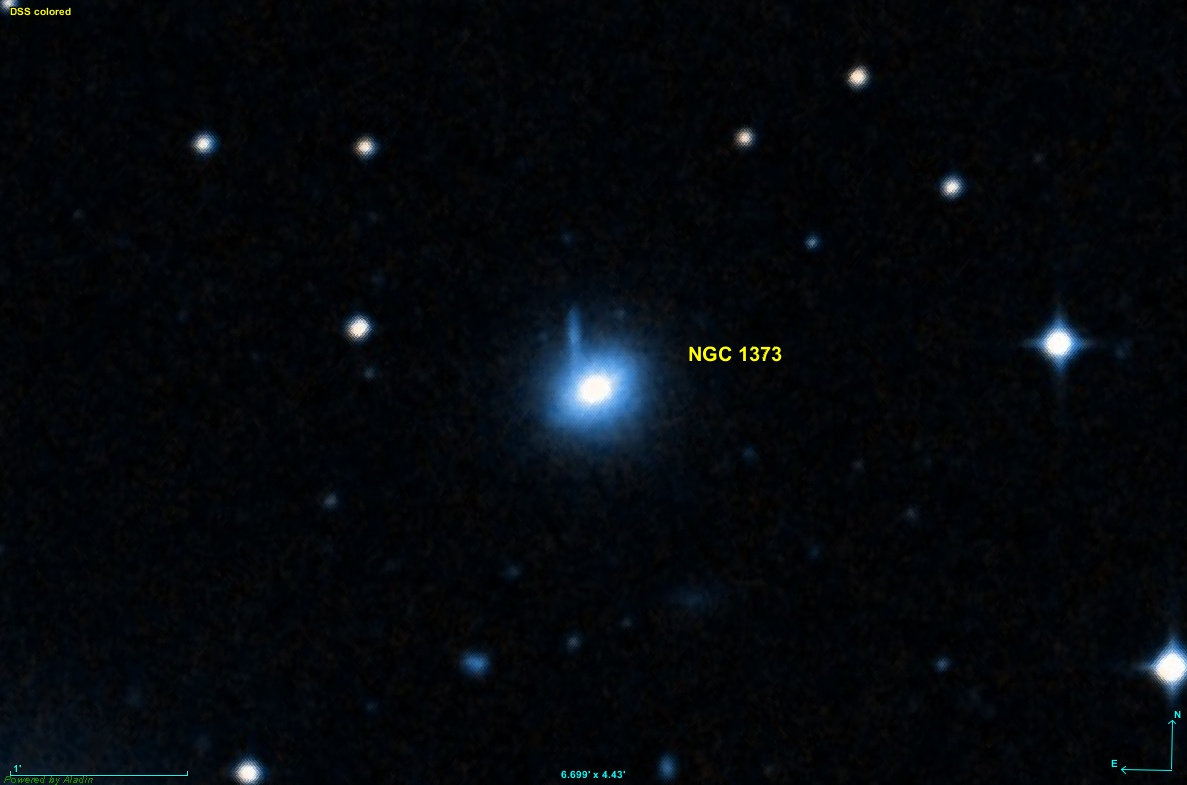
- DSS image of NGC 1373.

Observation data (J2000 epoch)
- Constellation: Fornax (constellation)
- Right ascension: 03^{h} 34^{m} 59.2^{s}
- Declination: −35° 10′ 16″
- Redshift: 0.004450
- Heliocentric radial velocity: 1334 km/s
- Distance: 61.13 Mly (18.744 Mpc)
- Group or cluster: Fornax Cluster
- Apparent magnitude (V): 14.1
- Absolute magnitude (V): −18.77

Characteristics
- Type: E+
- Mass: 1.3×10^{9} (Stellar mass)/6×10^{10} (Total Mass) M_{☉}
- Size: ~18,800 ly (5.76 kpc) (estimated)
- Apparent size (V): 1.1 x 0.9

Other designations
- ESO 358- G 021, MCG -06-08-028, FCC 143, PGC 013252

NGC 1373 is a dwarf elliptical galaxy located 61 million light years away in constellation of Fornax. The galaxy was discovered by astronomer John Herschel on November 29, 1837, and is a member of the Fornax Cluster. NGC 1373 is a host to a supermassive black hole with an estimated mass of 4.6 million solar masses.

63 known globular clusters have been observed surrounding NGC 1373, along with 13 observed planetary nebulae.

== Physical characteristics ==
NGC 1373 is one of the most compact and faint elliptical galaxies in the Fornax Cluster. As NGC 1373 is a compact elliptical galaxy, in the Fornax Cluster, it is expected to have older and more metal-rich populations of stars than similar compact elliptical galaxies of lower masses. It is thought that NGC 1373 originated as a more extended galaxy that transformed into a compact dwarf as it fell falling through the cluster.

NGC 1373 appears to be interacting with the galaxy NGC 1374 and is separated from the galaxy by a distance of around 980,000 ly (0.3 Mpc). This is evident as observations using the VLT Survey Telescope reveal the presence of a faint filament of matter connecting the two galaxies.

== See also ==
- List of NGC objects (1001–2000)
- Messier 32
- Messier 110
