= NGC 1396 =

Dwarf elliptical galaxy in the constellation of Fornax

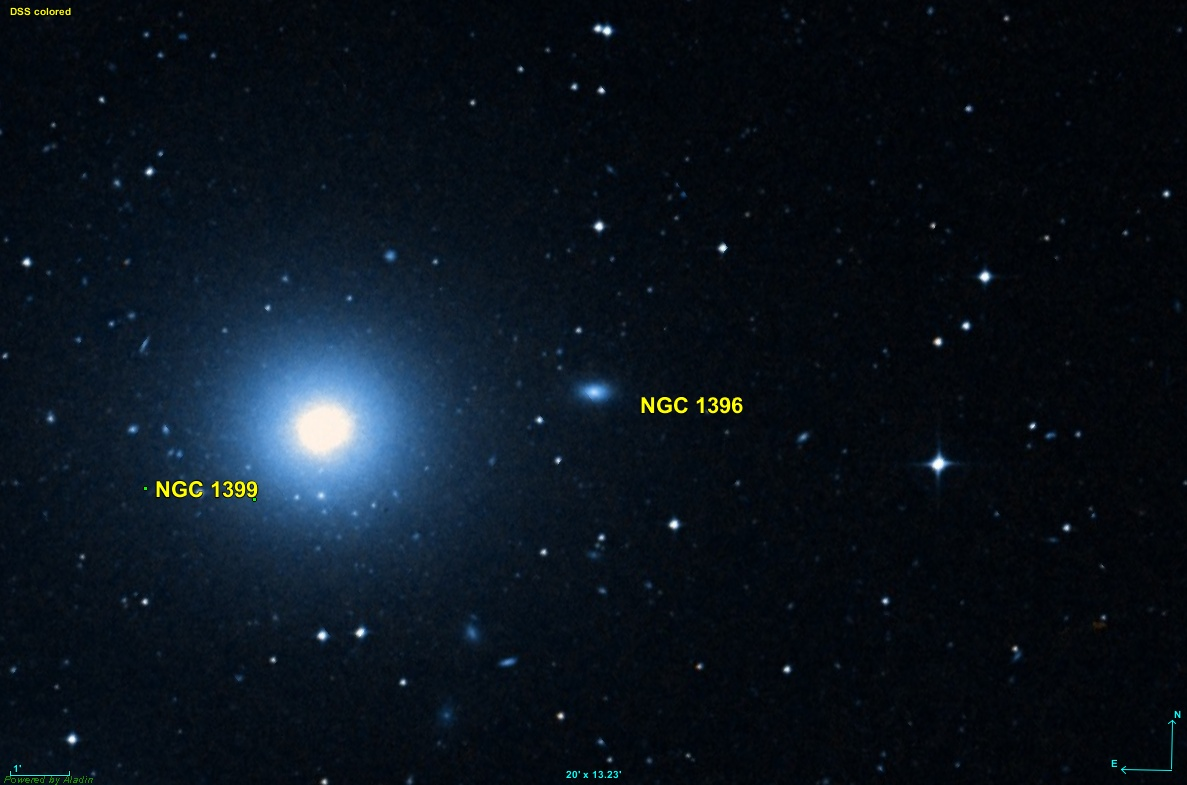
- DSS image of NGC 1396. NGC 1399 can be seen to the left of NGC 1396

Observation data (J2000 epoch)
- Constellation: Fornax (constellation)
- Right ascension: 03^{h} 38^{m} 06.5^{s}
- Declination: −35° 26′ 24″
- Redshift: 0.002695
- Heliocentric radial velocity: 808 km/s
- Distance: 62.05 Mly (19.025 Mpc)
- Group or cluster: Fornax Cluster
- Apparent magnitude (V): 14.82
- Absolute magnitude (V): −16.3

Characteristics
- Type: d:E6,N
- Mass: 5.6×10^{8} (Stellar mass)/1×10^{9} (Total Mass) M_{☉}
- Size: ~23,900 ly (7.33 kpc) (estimated)
- Apparent size (V): 1.0 x 0.9

Other designations
- ESO 358- ? 041, FCC 202, PGC 013398

NGC 1396 is a dwarf elliptical galaxy located 61 million light years away in the constellation of Fornax. The galaxy was discovered by astronomer Julius Schmidt on January 19, 1865, and is a member of the Fornax Cluster. Despite the fact that the galaxy PGC 13398 is most commonly identified as NGC 1396, there is uncertainty in its identification.

NGC 1396 is a satellite galaxy of NGC 1399.

232 known globular clusters have been observed surrounding NGC 1396, along with a central nuclear star cluster with an estimated mass of 9.6 million M_{☉}.

NGC 1396 has a metallicity of [Fe/H]~ -0.4, with unusually overabundant values of [Ca/Fe] ~+ 0.1, and underabundant sodium, with [Na/Fe] values around -0.1, while [Mg/Fe] is overabundant throughout the galaxy, increasing at a greater distance from the center of the galaxy. These abundance ratios compared with galaxies in the Local Group, show that the chemical enrichment history of the interstellar medium of NGC 1396 is similar to the galactic disc of the Milky Way. This implies that NGC 1396 originated as a progenitor galaxy the size of the Large Magellanic Cloud that lost its gas as it fell though the Fornax Cluster.

== See also ==
- List of NGC objects (1001–2000)
- Messier 32
- Messier 110
