= Beta Fornacis =

Star in the constellation Fornax

β Fornacis
- Location of β Fornacis (circled in red)

Observation data Epoch J2000.0 Equinox J2000.0 (ICRS)
- Constellation: Fornax
- Right ascension: 02^{h} 49^{m} 05.41890^{s}
- Declination: −32° 24′ 21.2320″
- Apparent magnitude (V): 4.46

Characteristics
- Evolutionary stage: red clump
- Spectral type: G8 III
- U−B color index: +0.69
- B−V color index: +0.99
- R−I color index: +0.54

Astrometry
Radial velocity (R_{v})	+17.56±0.12 km/s
Proper motion (μ)	RA: +86.023 mas/yr Dec.: +159.404 mas/yr
Parallax (π)	18.4596±0.1024 mas
Distance	176.7 ± 1.0 ly (54.2 ± 0.3 pc)
Absolute magnitude (M_{V})	0.894

Details
Mass	1.33±0.01 M_{☉}
Radius	10.45±0.07 R_{☉}
Luminosity	51.3±0.7 L_{☉}
Surface gravity (log g)	2.67±0.10 cgs
Temperature	4,790±50 K
Metallicity [Fe/H]	−0.34±0.10 dex
Rotational velocity (v sin i)	2.19 km/s
Age	3.27±0.02 Gyr

Other designations
- β For, CD−32°1025, FK5 101, HD 17652, HIP 13147, HR 841, NLTT 9066, SAO 193931, WDS 02491-3224A

Database references
SIMBAD	data

Beta Fornacis (Beta For, β Fornacis, β For) is solitary star in the southern constellation of Fornax. It is visible to the naked eye with an apparent visual magnitude of 4.46. Based upon an annual parallax shift of 18.46 mas, it is located around 177 light years away from the Sun. At that distance, the visual magnitude is reduced by an interstellar extinction factor of 0.1.

This is an evolved, G-type giant star with a stellar classification of G8 III. It is a red clump giant, which means it has undergone helium flash and is currently generating energy through the fusion of helium at its core. Beta Fornacis has 1.33 times the mass of the Sun and, at an age of 3.3 billion years, has expanded to 10.5 times the Sun's radius. It is radiating 51 times the solar luminosity from its outer atmosphere at an effective temperature of 4,790 K.

Beta Fornacis has a visual companion, CCDM J02491-3224B, which has an apparent visual magnitude of approximately 14.0. As of 1928, it lay at an angular separation of 4.80 arc seconds along a position angle of 67°. Located around three degrees to the southwest is the globular cluster NGC 1049.
