= Kappa Fornacis =

Star system in the constellation Fornax

- Location of κ Fornacis (circled)

Observation data Epoch J2000.0 Equinox ICRS
- Constellation: Fornax
- Right ascension: 02^{h} 22^{m} 32.60343^{s}
- Declination: −23° 48′ 00.4878″
- Apparent magnitude (V): 5.3187±0.0005

Characteristics

κ For A
- Spectral type: G1V-IV (Note: Though the star is referenced as G1V, even when correcting for the secondary it is over-luminous for a dwarf: on the Hertzsprung-Russell diagram (see image) the star lies approximately halfway between the dwarf and subgiant band. The log g of the star indicates that it is a subgiant and the solar metallicity excludes cooling, so it must be evolved.)
- B−V color index: 0.608±0.017 (system total)

Kappa Fornacis Bab
- Spectral type: ~M0V / ~M0V

Astrometry

κ For A
Radial velocity (R_{v})	16.67±0.06 km/s
Proper motion (μ)	RA: 150.725 mas/yr Dec.: 5.364 mas/yr
Parallax (π)	44.0905±0.2799 mas
Distance	74.0 ± 0.5 ly (22.7 ± 0.1 pc)
Absolute magnitude (M_{V})	+3.48

κ For Bab

Orbit
Primary	κ For A
Secondary	κ For Bab
Period (P)	25.81±0.15 years
Semi-major axis (a)	0.521 ± 0.004" (11.8 AU (Note: Semi-major axis in AU = $\frac{semimajor\ axis\ in\ seconds}{parallax\ in\ seconds}\ {{=}}\ \frac{0.521}{0.0440905}$ = 11.8 AU; as the eccentricity is 0.34, the distance fluctuates between 66% and 134% of that, roughly from 7.81 AU to 15.8 AU.))
Eccentricity (e)	0.339±0.013
Inclination (i)	50.4±0.5°
Longitude of the node (Ω)	139.8±1.4°
Periastron epoch (T)	1988.89±0.17
Argument of periastron (ω) (secondary)	266.3±1.0°
Semi-amplitude (K_{1}) (primary)	5.23±0.13 km/s

Orbit
Primary	κ For Ba
Secondary	κ For Bb
Period (P)	approx. 3.666 days
Eccentricity (e)	0 (assumed)
Semi-amplitude (K_{1}) (primary)	approx. 83 km/s
Semi-amplitude (K_{2}) (secondary)	approx. 83 km/s

Details

κ For A
Mass	1.20±0.05 M_{☉}
Surface gravity (log g)	3.99±0.15 cgs
Temperature	5,853±49 K
Metallicity [Fe/H]	−0.06±0.05 dex
Age	5.7±0.6 Gyr

κ For Bab
Mass	1.05±0.18 (subsystem total)M_{☉} approx. 0.53±0.09 / 0.53±0.09 M_{☉}

Other designations
- CD−24°1038, GJ 97, HD 14802, HIP 11072, HR 695, SAO 167736

Database references
SIMBAD	data

Kappa Fornacis (κ For) is a star system that lies approximately 72 light-years away. The system consists of a somewhat evolved primary orbited by a pair of red dwarfs, making a hierarchal triple system.

== Multiplicity ==
Kappa Fornacis was found to be 0.23 arcseconds north of an X-ray and Radio source in 1995, a distance so close that it is most likely associated with the star. While this would indicate that the star is active and therefore young, private communication indicated that Kappa Fornacis was a spectroscopic binary, leaving the possibility that a companion star was the source of the excess emission.

The Hipparcos mission detected a large 19.4 mas/year acceleration in the proper motion of Kappa Fornacis, suggesting that part of an orbit was being observed. Combining this with other proper motion data spanning approximately half a century indicated a periodic variation of 26.5 ± 2 years, confirming that the star is an astrometric binary. The amplitude of the variation indicated a mass sum of 2.3 ± 0.1 M_{☉}; with a primary of approximately 1.2 M_{☉}, it was evident that the two components must have approximately equal masses. However, as the companion's light or spectrum was not observed, it was clear that it was fainter than a main sequence star. This was interpreted as the companion being a white dwarf.

Apparently unaware of the indication of binarity, Kappa Fornacis was included in several radial velocity-based planet searches that began towards the end of the century. A long-period variability was obvious; a linear trend of -1.73 ± 0.02 m/s/d was found by the CCPS, while the longer time series of the ESO-CES survey, non-linearity in the trend was apparent and a preliminary orbit was presented, considerably shorter than the astrometric one. Abt et al. 2006 expanded upon this with new and historical data to find a more precise orbit, again shorter than the astrometric one. More recently, a continuation of the ESO-CES survey to the HARPS spectrograph indicates that the companion's orbital period is somewhat longer, more consistent with the astrometric period.

Kappa Fornacis B was first resolved independently by Lafrenière et al. (2007) and Tokovinin and Cantarutti (2008), both finding a separation of about 0.5 arcseconds that is consistent with the astrometric orbit. The difference in brightness between the two components confirmed that the secondary is overly faint for its mass; The latter paper ascribes this to it being a massive white dwarf or a close M-dwarf binary, but could not discriminate between the two possibilities. The companion has been resolved several times since, allowing for a preliminary visual orbit to be made by 2012.

Tokovinin (2013) combined spectroscopic and visual data on the system to find the most accurate determination of the binary orbit thus far. While the photometric colours of the secondary are consistent with an early M-dwarf (~0.48 M_{☉}), it lies above the main sequence, meaning that its luminosity is too high to be a single star. This means that the secondary must actually be two close stars of similar spectral type, themselves orbiting the more massive primary. Two faint absorption lines were weakly detected in the Hα line, varying by about 80 km/s over a period of a few days; these are consistent with two M-dwarfs orbiting each other, confirming that the secondary is a close binary. The subsystem consists of two approximately equal-mass red dwarfs orbiting each other every ~3.7 days. Binaries with such close orbits typically maintain high levels of activity for their lifetimes due to their rotational periods being synchronised to their orbital period, so the components of the secondary are the source of the excess energy in the system.

== Properties ==
In terms of an object on the celestial sphere, Kappa Fornacis is a fifth magnitude star that lies close to the border between the northerly border of Fornax with Cetus. At magnitude 5.2, it is approximately the seventh-brightest star in the constellation.

Kappa Fornacis A's colours and temperature indicate that it has a spectral type of G1 V, meaning that it is about 100 kelvins hotter than the Sun. On the Hertzsprung-Russell diagram (left) the star lies somewhat above the main sequence, indicating that it is in the process of evolving between the dwarf and subgiant stage; this is supported by its surface gravity being lower than a typical G-dwarf and its low level of chromospheric activity (log R'_{HK} ≈ -5.0). The star has a mass that is about a fifth larger than solar, a value that would be typical of a late F-dwarf (~F7V) when it was on the main sequence. Different methods to estimate the age of the star generally agree that Kappa Fornacis A is 5 to 6 billion years old, making it perhaps 1 billion years older than the Sun. This age corresponds to both the oldest members of the thin disk and the youngest members of the thick disk, though the system falls into the former population based on its kinematics (UVW = -19.5, -16.2, -9.6 km/s) and its close-to-solar metallicity.

The two components of Kappa Fornacis B are both early M-dwarfs. Assuming that they are identical, they both have masses approximately half that of the Sun. Because they are in such a short-period orbit, tidal effects will maintain a high level of activity on both stars (in analogue with CM Draconis), meaning that they likely experience flares and rotational variation (BY Draconis variability).
