= Fornax Dwarf =

Dwarf galaxy in the constellation Fornax

Fornax Dwarf Spheroidal
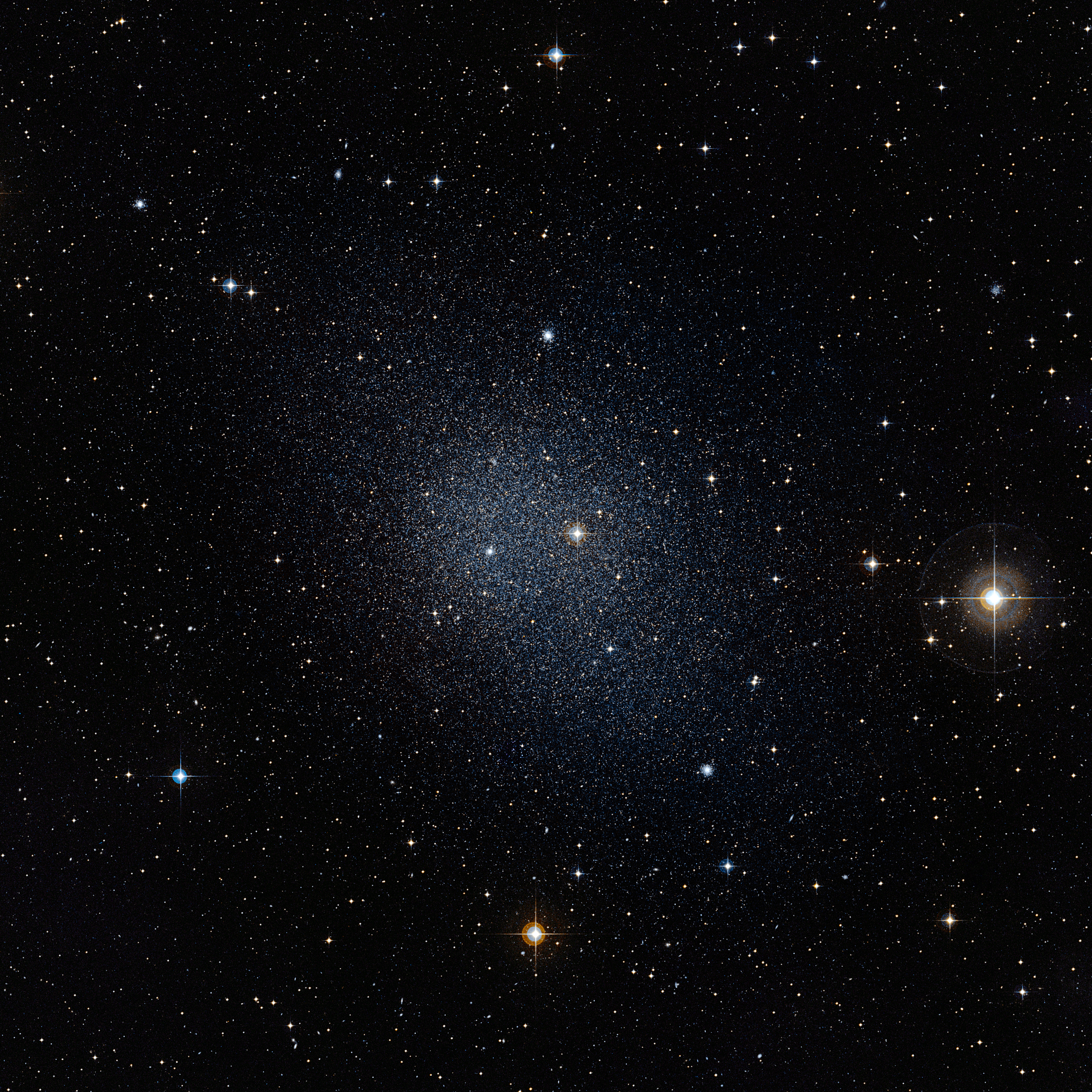
- The Fornax dwarf galaxy

Observation data (J2000 epoch)
- Constellation: Fornax
- Right ascension: 02^{h} 39^{m} 59.3^{s}
- Declination: −34° 26′ 57″
- Redshift: 53 ± 9 km/s
- Distance: 466 ± 10 kilolight-years (142.9 ± 3.1 kpc)
- Apparent magnitude (V): 9.3

Characteristics
- Type: dE0
- Size: 2.85 kiloparsecs (9,295 ly)
- Apparent size (V): 17.0′ × 12.6′
- Notable features: has 6 globular clusters

Other designations
- Fornax dSph, Fornax Dwarf Elliptical, Fornax Dwarf Galaxy, Fornax dE, PGC 10074 / 10093, ESO 356-4

The Fornax Dwarf Spheroidal (formerly known as the Fornax System) is a dwarf elliptical galaxy in the constellation Fornax that was discovered in 1938 by Harlow Shapley. He discovered it while he was in South Africa on photographic plates taken by the 24 inch (61 cm) Bruce refractor at Boyden Observatory, shortly after he discovered the Sculptor Dwarf Galaxy.

The galaxy is a satellite of the Milky Way and contains six globular clusters, an unusually high number for its size; the largest, NGC 1049, was discovered before the galaxy itself. The galaxy is also receding from the Milky Way at 53 km/s. It mostly contains population II stars, but also has populations of young and intermediate age.

== Globular clusters ==
Using the Hubble Space Telescope, scientists derived a color-magnitude diagram for Fornax 4, a globular cluster within this galaxy. Unlike the globular clusters Fornax 1, 2, 3, and 5, which have horizontal branches across a wide range of colors and include RR Lyrae variables, Fornax 4 is found to have only red in its horizontal branch. Fornax 4 is also ~3 Gyr younger than the other globular clusters. The color-magnitude diagram of Fornax 4 has a strong similarity to "young" galactic globular Ruprecht 106.

It has been debated for some time whether the globular cluster Fornax 6 is a true member of the Fornax Dwarf, or merely a chance alignment of stars and/or galaxies. A 2021 study found it to be a true cluster and a member, but it is notably more metal-rich and therefore likely younger than the other clusters. It is estimated to be about 2 billion years old.

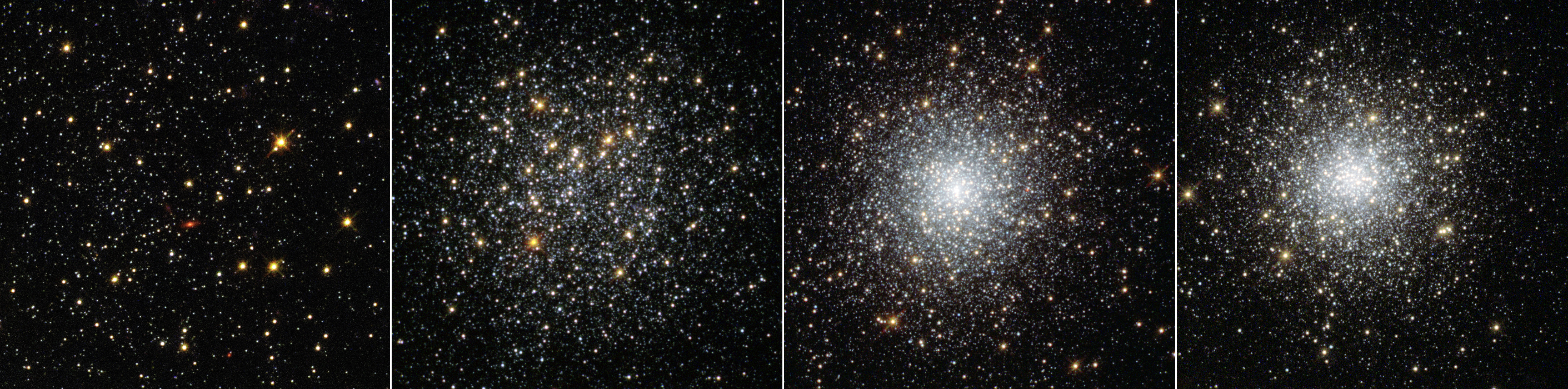
Hubble Space Telescope image of four of the globular clusters in Fornax Dwarf

It is not known why spheroidals allow the formation of globular clusters like Fornax 4 and Terzan 7 (of Sagittarius dwarf) long after globular clusters ceased to form in the main body of the Galactic halo. Another possibility is that "young" globular clusters of the outer halo like Ruprecht 106 were originally formed in now defunct dwarf spheroidals.
