= Nu Fornacis =

Bluish variable star in the constellation Fornax

- Location of ν Fornacis (circled in red)

Observation data Epoch J2000 Equinox ICRS
- Constellation: Fornax
- Right ascension: 02^{h} 04^{m} 29.43861^{s}
- Declination: −29° 17′ 48.5477″
- Apparent magnitude (V): 4.68 to 4.73

Characteristics
- Spectral type: B9.5IIIspSi
- U−B color index: −0.51
- B−V color index: −0.17
- Variable type: α^{2} CVn

Astrometry
Radial velocity (R_{v})	+18.50 km/s
Proper motion (μ)	RA: +12.79 mas/yr Dec.: +8.48 mas/yr
Parallax (π)	8.79±0.26 mas
Distance	370 ± 10 ly (114 ± 3 pc)
Absolute magnitude (M_{V})	−0.60

Details
Mass	3.65±0.18 M_{☉}
Radius	3.44 R_{☉}
Luminosity	245 L_{☉}
Temperature	13,400 K
Rotation	1.89 d
Rotational velocity (v sin i)	50±5 km/s

Other designations
- ν For, CD−29°706, FK5 1055, GC 2506, HD 12767, HIP 9677, HR 612, SAO 167532

Database references
SIMBAD	data

Nu Fornacis, Latinized from ν Fornacis, is a single, variable star in the southern constellation of Fornax. It is blue-white in hue and faintly visible to the naked eye with an apparent visual magnitude that fluctuates around 4.7. This body is located approximately 370 light years distant from the Sun based on parallax, and is drifting further away with a radial velocity of +18.5 km/s. It is a candidate member of the Pisces-Eridanus stellar stream, which suggests an age of 120 million years or less.

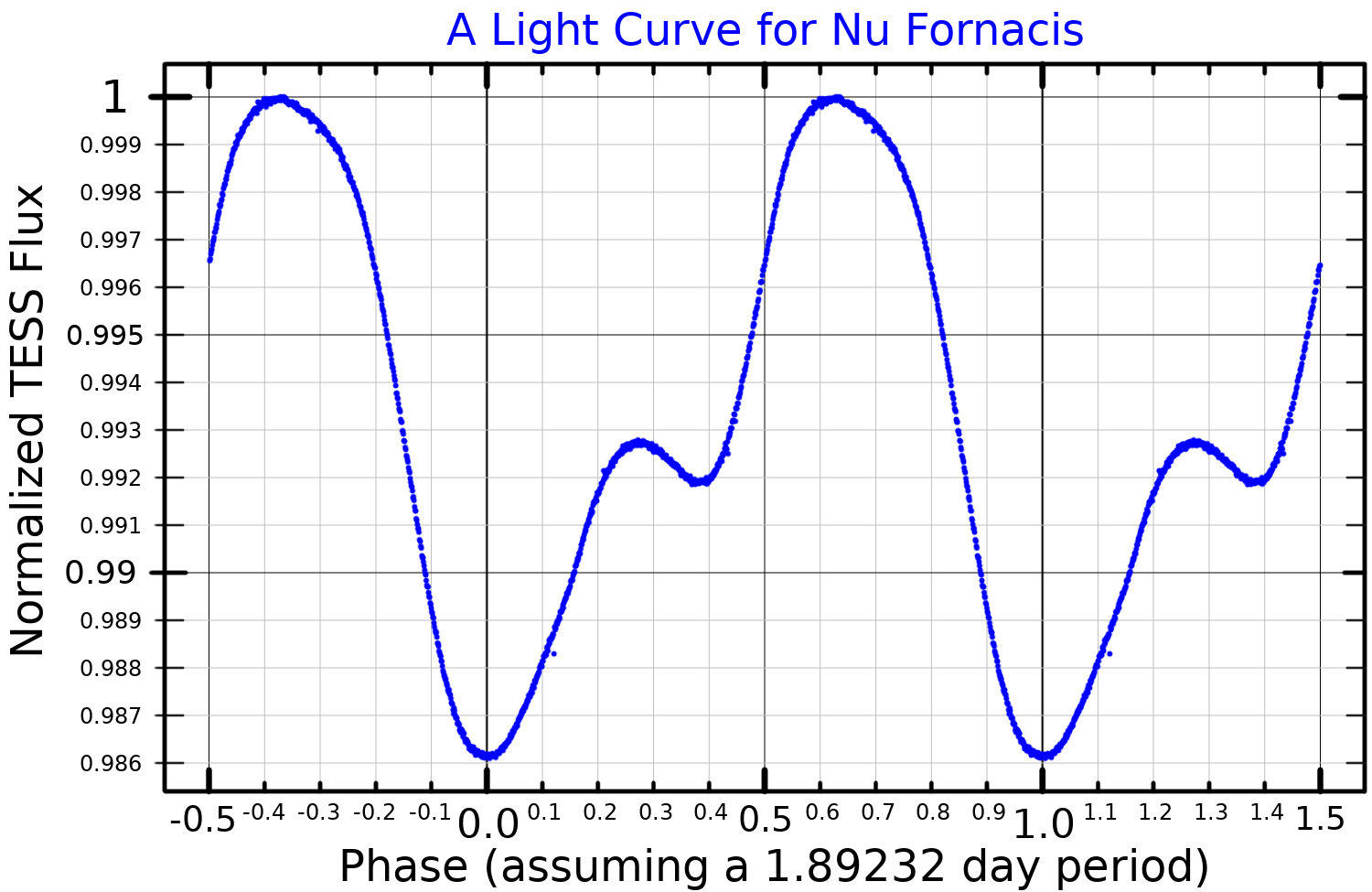
A light curve for Nu Fornacis plotted from TESS data

This object is an Ap star with a stellar classification of B9.5IIIspSi matching a late B-type giant star. The 'Si' suffix indicates an abundance anomaly of silicon. It is an Alpha^{2} Canum Venaticorum variable that ranges from magnitude 4.68 down to 4.73 with a period of 1.89 days – the same as its rotational period. It is 3.65 times as massive and 245 times as luminous as the Sun, with 3.44 times the Sun's diameter.
