= NGC 990 =

Galaxy located in the constellation Aries

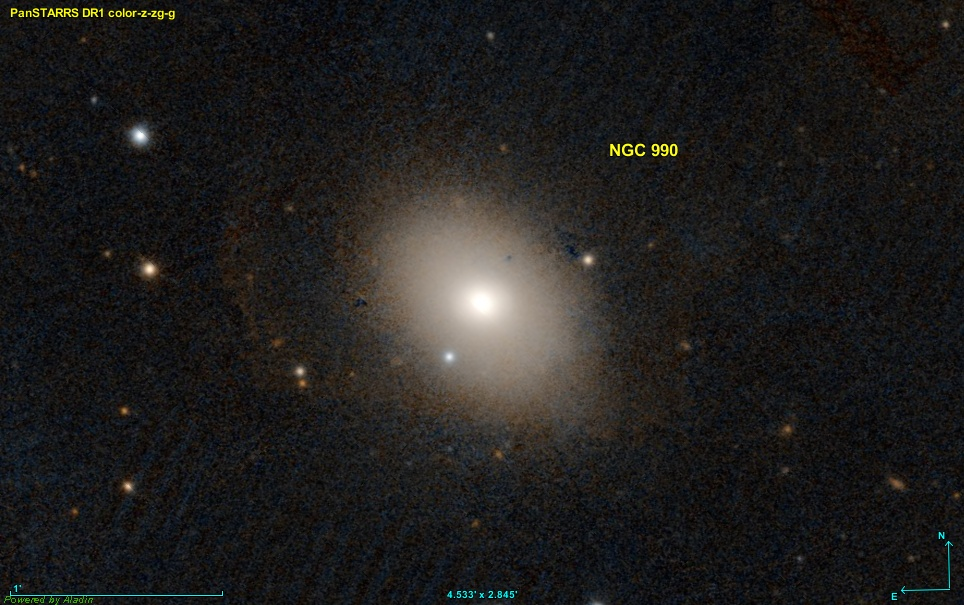
- Pan-STARRS image of NGC 990

Observation data (J2000 epoch)
- Constellation: Aries
- Right ascension: 02^{h} 36^{m} 18.206^{s}
- Declination: +11° 38′ 31.57″
- Redshift: 0.011701
- Heliocentric radial velocity: 3487 km/s
- Distance: 153.0 Mly (46.90 Mpc)
- Apparent magnitude (V): 12.46
- Apparent magnitude (B): 13.49

Characteristics
- Type: E

Other designations
- UGC 2089, MCG +02-07-018, PGC 9890

NGC 990 is an elliptical galaxy located in the constellation Aries about 153 million light-years from the Milky Way. It was discovered by the German - British astronomer William Herschel in 1786.

NGC 990 is part of a galaxy group known as LGG 69. It has at least 3 members, which are NGC 990, NGC 1024 and NGC 1029.

== See also ==
- List of NGC objects (1–1000)
