= Omega Fornacis =

Binary star system in the constellation Fornax

- Location of ω Fornacis (circled in red)

Observation data Epoch J2000.0 Equinox ICRS
- Constellation: Fornax
- Right ascension: 02^{h} 33^{m} 50.70081^{s}
- Declination: −28° 13′ 56.3890″
- Apparent magnitude (V): 4.95 + 7.71

Characteristics

A
- Evolutionary stage: main sequence
- Spectral type: B9V
- U−B color index: −0.13
- B−V color index: −0.050±0.007
- R−I color index: −0.07

B
- Spectral type: A3V
- U−B color index: +0.09
- B−V color index: +0.17

Astrometry
Radial velocity (R_{v})	+9.7±2.8 km/s
Proper motion (μ)	RA: −13.290±0.243 mas/yr Dec.: −5.532±0.305 mas/yr
Parallax (π)	7.0025±0.1527 mas
Distance	470 ± 10 ly (143 ± 3 pc)
Absolute magnitude (M_{V})	−0.87

Details

A
Mass	3.42±0.11 M_{☉}
Radius	2.81 R_{☉}
Luminosity	268+72 −57 L_{☉}
Temperature	10,910±420 K
Rotational velocity (v sin i)	85±13 km/s

B
Radius	2.2 R_{☉}
Rotational velocity (v sin i)	180±29 km/s

Other designations
- ω For, CD−28°819, HD 16046, HIP 11918, HR 749, SAO 167882, CCDM J02338-2814AB, WDS J02338-2814

Database references
SIMBAD	data

Omega Fornacis, which is Latinized from ω Fornacis, is a wide binary star system in the southern constellation of Fornax. It has a blue-white hue and is faintly visible to the naked eye as a fifth-magnitude star. The system lies at a distance of approximately 470 light years from the Sun based on parallax, and is drifting further away with a radial velocity of +10 km/s.

The dual nature of this system was discovered in 1836 by John Herschel. As of 2013, the two components had an angular separation of 11.0″ along a position angle of 246°. This corresponds to a projected separation of 1,520 AU.

The magnitude 4.95 primary, designated component A, is a chemically peculiar B-type main-sequence star with a stellar classification of B9V It has 3.4 times the Sun's mass and is radiating around 268 times the luminosity of the Sun from its photosphere at an effective temperature of 10,910 K. Component B, the magnitude 7.71 secondary, is an A-type main-sequence star with a class of A3V. It is smaller than the primary, but has a higher projected rotational velocity.
