= NGC 3049 =

Spiral Galaxy in the constellation Leo

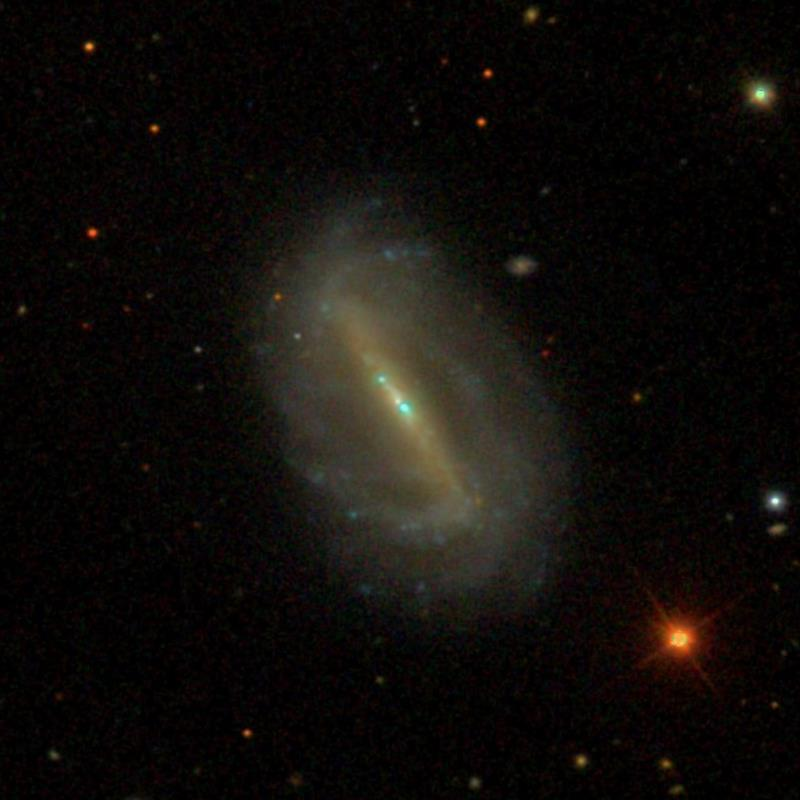
- NGC 3049, as seen during the Sloan Digital Sky Survey

Observation data (J2000 epoch)
- Constellation: Leo
- Right ascension: 09^{h} 54^{m} 49.5648^{s}
- Declination: +09° 16′ 15.940″
- Redshift: 0.004965
- Heliocentric radial velocity: 1488 ± 1 km/s
- Distance: 75.46 ± 6.67 Mly (23.136 ± 2.045 Mpc)
- Apparent magnitude (V): 12.1
- Apparent magnitude (B): 12.9
- Surface brightness: 13.4 mag/am^{2}

Characteristics
- Type: SB(rs)ab

Other designations
- UGC 5325, MCG +02-25-055, PGC 28590

NGC 3049 is a barred spiral galaxy located in the constellation Leo. Its velocity relative to the cosmic microwave background is 1793 ± 24 km/s, which corresponds to a Hubble distance of 26.4 ± 1.9 Mpc (~86.1 million ly). NGC 3049 was discovered by French astronomer Édouard Stephan in 1882.

The luminosity class of NGC 3049 is I-II and it has a broad HI line. It also contains regions of ionized hydrogen and is a starburst galaxy. NGC 3049 is also a field galaxy, that is to say it does not belong to a cluster or group and is therefore gravitationally isolated. NGC 3049 is a galaxy whose core shines in the field of ultraviolet. It is listed in the Markarian catalog under the reference Mrk 710 (MK 710).

To date, 11 non-redshift measurements yield a distance of 23.136 ± 6.782 Mpc (~75.5 million ly), which is within the Hubble distance. Note, however, that it is with the average value of independent measurements, when they exist, that the NASA/IPAC database calculates the diameter of a galaxy and that consequently the diameter of NGC 3049 could be approximately 19 .2 kpc (~62,600 ly) if Hubble distance was used to calculate it.

== See also ==
- List of NGC objects (3001–4000)
