= NGC 1024 =

Spiral galaxy in the constellation Aries

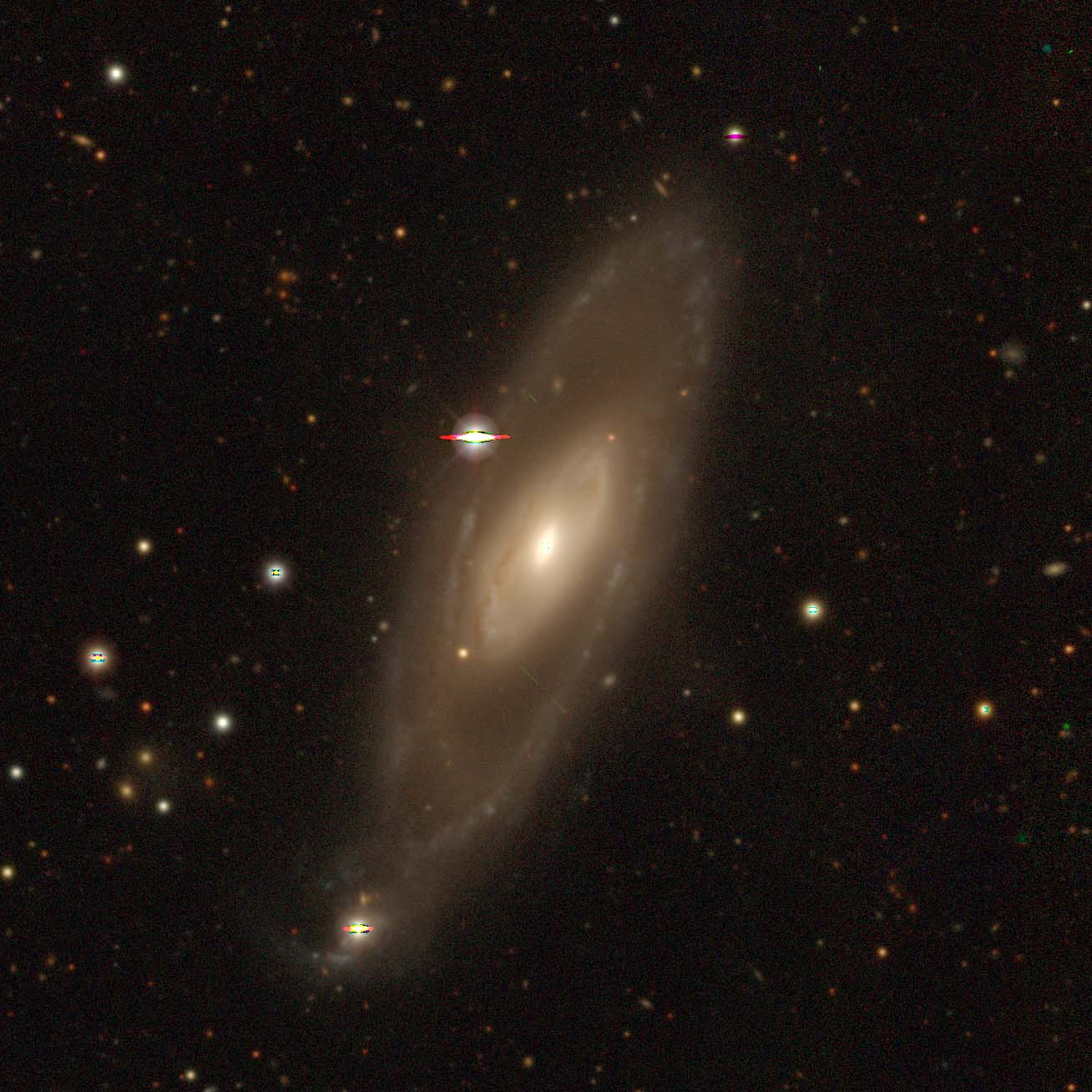
- Legacy Surveys image of NGC 1024

Observation data (J2000 epoch)
- Constellation: Aries
- Right ascension: 02h 39m 11s
- Declination: +10° 50′ 48″
- Redshift: 0.011801
- Heliocentric radial velocity: 3,538 km/s
- Distance: 159 Mly (48.7 Mpc)
- Surface brightness: 23.61 mag/arcsec^2

Other designations
- ARP 333, PGC 10048, MCG 2-7-20, UGC 2142, CGCG 439-22, IRAS 02365+1037

NGC 1024 is a large spiral galaxy of type Sab located in the constellation Aries. Its speed relative to the cosmic microwave background is 3,306 ± 16 km/s, which corresponds to a Hubble distance of 48.8 ± 3.4 Mpc (~159 million light-years). NGC 1024 was discovered by German-British astronomer William Herschel in 1786.

NGC 1024 was used in the Atlas of Peculiar Galaxies as an example of a motley galaxy.

The luminosity class of NGC 1024 is I-II and it has a broad HI line. With a surface brightness equal to 14.02 mag/am^2, we can qualify NGC 1024 as a low surface brightness (LSB) galaxy. LSB galaxies are diffuse (D) galaxies with a surface brightness less than one magnitude lower than that of the ambient night sky.

To date, five non-redshift measurements yield a distance of 46.260 ± 3.155 Mpc (~151 million ly), which is within the Hubble distance range.

== NGC 1024 Group ==
NGC 1024 is the largest and brightest of a small group of three galaxies named after it. The other two galaxies in the NGC 1024 group are NGC 990 and NGC 1029. On the other hand, NGC 1024 and NGC 1029 form a pair of galaxies.

== See also ==
- List of NGC objects (1001–2000)
- New General Catalogue
