= Alpha Fornacis =

Star in the constellation Fornax

- Location of α Fornacis (circled in red)

Observation data Epoch J2000 Equinox ICRS
- Constellation: Fornax
- Right ascension: 03^{h} 12^{m} 04.5298^{s}
- Declination: −28° 59′ 15.439″
- Apparent magnitude (V): 3.92 (3.98/7.19)

Characteristics
- Spectral type: F6V + G7V + WD?
- U−B color index: +0.082
- B−V color index: +0.581

Astrometry
Radial velocity (R_{v})	−20.5 km/s
Proper motion (μ)	RA: +359.565 mas/yr Dec.: +619.186 mas/yr
Parallax (π)	71.4337±0.1320 mas
Distance	45.66 ± 0.08 ly (14.00 ± 0.03 pc)
Absolute magnitude (M_{V})	3.08

Orbit
Period (P)	278±6 yr
Semi-major axis (a)	4.03±0.05″
Eccentricity (e)	0.749±0.008
Inclination (i)	81.6±0.4°
Longitude of the node (Ω)	117.1±0.2°
Periastron epoch (T)	1,947.8±0.4
Argument of periastron (ω) (secondary)	44.7±1.0°

Details

α For A
Mass	1.33±0.01 M_{☉}
Radius	2.04±0.06 R_{☉}
Luminosity	4.87±0.16 L_{☉}
Surface gravity (log g)	4.27 cgs
Temperature	6,240 K
Metallicity [Fe/H]	−0.20 dex
Rotational velocity (v sin i)	3.9 km/s
Age	2.9 Gyr

α For Ba
Mass	0.78 M_{☉}
Temperature	5,040 K

Other designations
- α For, 12 Eridani, CD−29°1177, GJ 127, HD 20010, HIP 14879, HR 963, SAO 168373, LTT 1512, 2MASS J03120443-2859156

Database references
SIMBAD	data

Alpha Fornacis (α Fornacis, abbreviated Alpha For, α For) is a triple star system in the southern constellation of Fornax. At a combined apparent magnitude of 3.92, it is the brightest star in the constellation and the only one brighter than magnitude 4.0. Based on parallax measurements obtained during the Gaia mission, it is 45.66 light-years distant.

Its three components are designated Alpha Fornacis A (officially named Dalim /ˈdeɪlɪm/), Alpha Fornacis Ba and Alpha Fornacis Bb.

== Nomenclature ==
α Fornacis (Latinised to Alpha Fornacis) is the system's Bayer designation. The designations of the three components as Alpha Fornacis A, Ba and Bb derive from the convention used by the Washington Multiplicity Catalog (WMC) for multiple star systems, and adopted by the International Astronomical Union (IAU). Formerly it was designated as the 12th of Eridanus (12 Eri) by Flamsteed.

Indigenous Arabs had named both Alpha Eridani and Fomalhaut ظَلِيم al-ẓalīm, a local word for 'ostrich'. Later, Arabian astronomer would transfer the appellation to Theta Eridani, as they could not see those other stars from their location. In recent times, Italian astronomer Giuseppe Piazzi applied it with the spelling Dalim to his "III 13" (= α For) in his Palermo Catalogue, and Elijah Burritt labeled it Fornacis in his Atlas.

In 2016, the IAU organized a Working Group on Star Names (WGSN) to catalog and standardize proper names for stars. The WGSN decided to attribute proper names to individual stars rather than entire multiple systems. It approved the name Dalim for the component Alpha Fornacis A on 5 September 2017 and it is now so included in the List of IAU-approved Star Names.

== Properties ==
Alpha Fornacis has a high proper motion and the system displays an excess of infrared emission, which may indicate the presence of circumstellar material such as a debris disk. The space velocity components of this star are (U, V, W) = (−35, +20, +30) km/s. Approximately 350,000 years ago, Alpha Fornacis experienced a close encounter with the A-type main-sequence star Nu Horologii. The two came within an estimated 0.265 ly (0.081 pc) of each other, and both stars have debris disks.

Alpha Fornacis A has a stellar classification of F6V, where the luminosity class V suggests this is a main sequence star. It is a fairly old star which has sometimes been considered to be a subgiant, although evolutionary models place it towards the end of its main sequence life. It has 33% more mass than the Sun and is an estimated 2.9 billion years old.

The secondary, Alpha Fornacis B, has been identified as a blue straggler, and has likely accumulated material from a third star in the past. It is a strong source of X-rays and is 78% as massive as the Sun. Such a third star, designated Alpha Fornacis Bb, was detected in 2016. Alpha Fornacis Ba is enriched in barium relative to star A, suggesting that its companion is likely a white dwarf.
