= NGC 1049 =

Globular cluster in the constellation Fornax

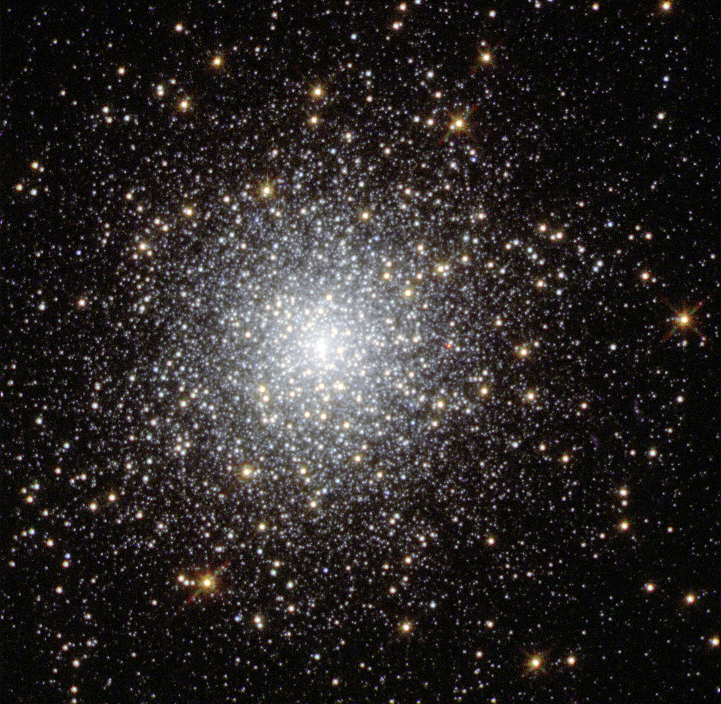
- NGC 1049 by Hubble Space Telescope

Observation data (J2000 epoch)
- Class: V
- Constellation: Fornax
- Right ascension: 02^{h} 39^{m} 52.5^{s}
- Declination: −34° 16′ 08″
- Distance: 143±3 kpc
- Apparent magnitude (V): +12.9
- Apparent dimensions (V): 24″

Physical characteristics
- Other designations: Hodge 3

NGC 1049 is a globular cluster located in the Local Group galaxy of the Fornax Dwarf, visible in the constellation of Fornax. At a distance of 460,000 light years, it is visible in moderate sized telescopes, while the parent galaxy is nearly invisible. This globular cluster was discovered by John Herschel on October 19, 1835, while the parent galaxy was discovered in 1938 by Harlow Shapley.
