= Fornax =

Constellation in the southern celestial hemisphere

- Constellation
- List of stars in Fornax
- Abbreviation: For
- Genitive: Fornacis
- Pronunciation: /ˈfɔːrnæks/, genitive /fɔːrˈneɪsɪs/
- Symbolism: the brazier
- Right ascension: 3^{h}
- Declination: −30°
- Quadrant: SQ1
- Area: 398 sq. deg. (41st)
- Main stars: 2
- Bayer/Flamsteed stars: 27
- Stars brighter than 3.00^{m}: 0
- Stars within 10.00 pc (32.62 ly): 2
- Brightest star: α For (3.80^{m})
- Nearest star: LP 944-20
- Messier objects: 0
- Meteor showers: 0
- Bordering constellations: Cetus; Sculptor; Phoenix; Eridanus
- Visible at latitudes between +50° and −90°. Best visible at 21:00 (9 p.m.) during the month of December.

Fornax (/ˈfɔːrnæks/) is a constellation in the southern celestial hemisphere, partly ringed by the celestial river Eridanus. Its name is Latin for furnace. It was named by French astronomer Nicolas Louis de Lacaille in 1756. Fornax is one of the 88 modern constellations.

The three brightest stars—Alpha, Beta and Nu Fornacis—form a flattened triangle facing south. With an apparent magnitude of 3.91, Alpha Fornacis is the brightest star in Fornax. Six star systems have been found to have exoplanets. The Fornax Dwarf galaxy is a small faint satellite galaxy of the Milky Way. NGC 1316 is a relatively close radio galaxy.

The Hubble Space Telescope's Ultra-Deep Field is located within Fornax.

It is the 41st largest constellation in the night-sky, occupying an area of 398 square degrees. It is located in the first quadrant of the southern hemisphere (SQ1) and can be seen at latitudes between +50° and -90° during the month of December.

== History ==
The French astronomer Nicolas Louis de Lacaille first described the constellation in French as le Fourneau Chymique (the Chemical Furnace) with an alembic and receiver in his early catalogue, before abbreviating it to le Fourneau on his planisphere in 1752, after he had observed and catalogued almost 10,000 southern stars during a two-year stay at the Cape of Good Hope. He devised fourteen new constellations in uncharted regions of the Southern Celestial Hemisphere not visible from Europe. All but one honoured instruments that symbolised the Age of Enlightenment. (Note: The exception is Mensa, named for the Table Mountain. The other thirteen (alongside Fornax) are Antlia, Caelum, Circinus, Horologium, Microscopium, Norma, Octans, Pictor, Pyxis, Reticulum, Sculptor and Telescopium.) Lacaille Latinised the name to Fornax Chimiae on his 1763 chart.

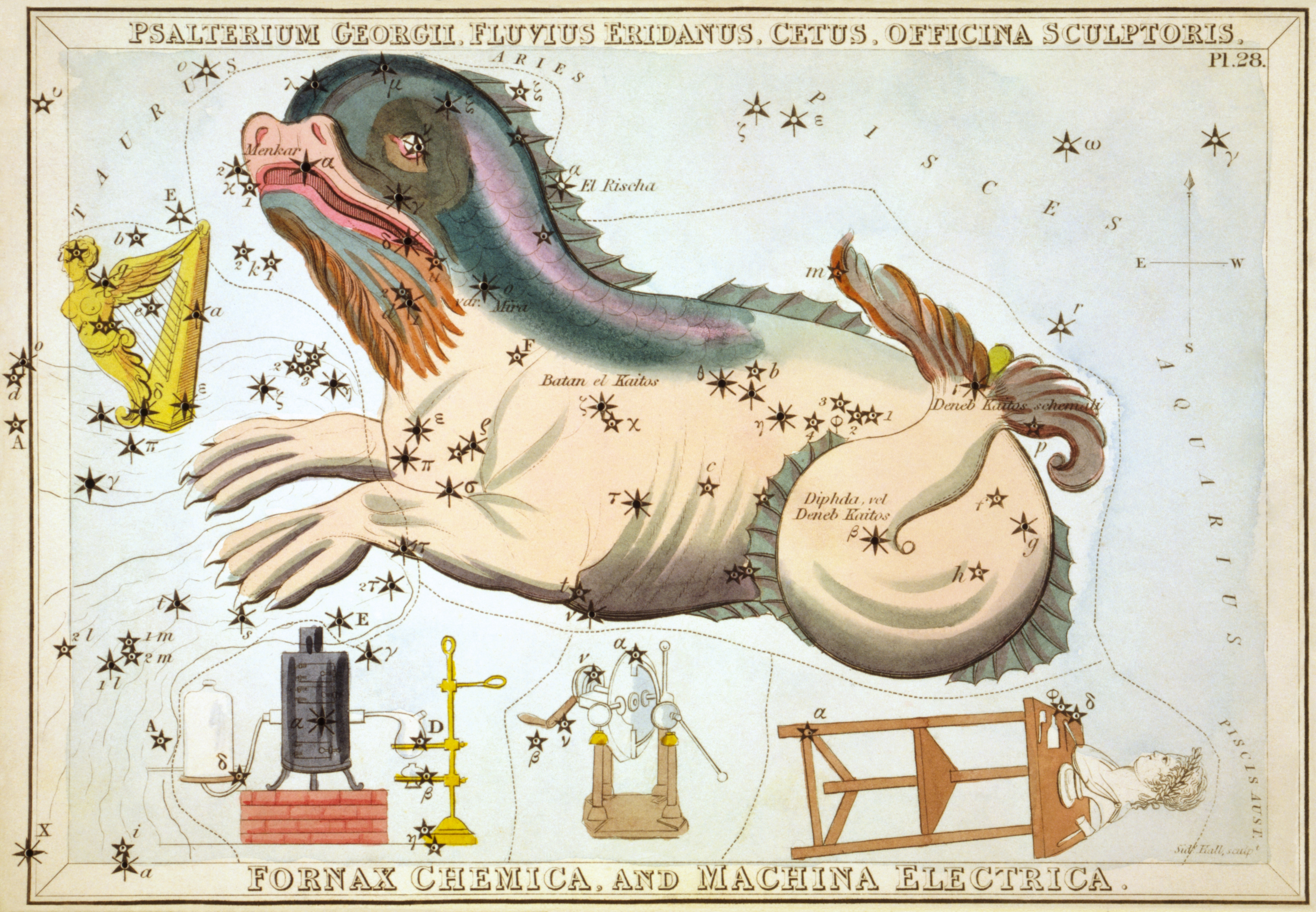
Fornax Chemica can be seen below Cetus in this card from Urania's Mirror (1825).

== Characteristics ==
The constellation Eridanus borders Fornax to the east, north and south, while Cetus, Sculptor and Phoenix gird it to the north, west and south respectively. Covering 397.5 square degrees and 0.964% of the night sky, it ranks 41st of the 88 constellations in size, The three-letter abbreviation for the constellation, as adopted by the International Astronomical Union in 1922, is "For". The official constellation boundaries, as set by Belgian astronomer Eugène Delporte in 1930, are defined by a polygon of eight segments (illustrated in infobox). In the equatorial coordinate system, the right ascension coordinates of these borders lie between 01^{h} 45^{m} 24.18^{s} and 03^{h} 50^{m} 21.34^{s}, while the declination coordinates are between −23.76° and −39.58°. The whole constellation is visible to observers south of latitude 50°N. (Note: While parts of the constellation technically rise above the horizon to observers between 50°N and 66°N, stars within a few degrees of the horizon are for all intents and purposes unobservable.)

== Features ==
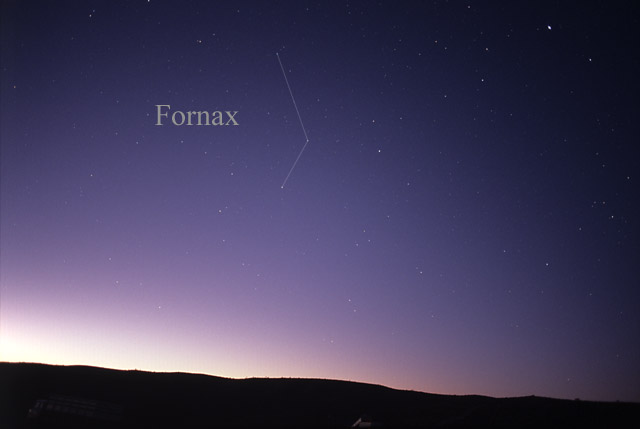
The constellation Fornax as it can be seen by the naked eye.

=== Stars ===
Lacaille gave Bayer designations to 27 stars now named Alpha to Omega Fornacis, labelling two stars 3.5 degrees apart as Gamma, three stars Eta, two stars Iota, two Lambda and three Chi. Phi Fornacis was added by Gould, and Theta and Omicron were dropped by Gould and Baily respectively. Upsilon, too, was later found to be two stars and designated as such. Overall, there are 59 stars within the constellation's borders brighter than or equal to apparent magnitude 6.5. (Note: Objects of magnitude 6.5 are among the faintest visible to the unaided eye in suburban-rural transition night skies.) However, there are no stars brighter than the fourth magnitude.

The three brightest stars form a flattish triangle, with Alpha (also called Dalim) and Nu Fornacis marking its eastern and western points and Beta Fornacis marking the shallow southern apex. Originally designated 12 Eridani by John Flamsteed, Alpha Fornacis was named by Lacaille as the brightest star in the new constellation. It is a binary star that can be resolved by small amateur telescopes. With an apparent magnitude of 3.91, the primary is a yellow-white subgiant 1.21 times as massive as the Sun that has begun to cool and expand after exhausting its core hydrogen, having swollen to 1.9 times the Sun's radius. Of magnitude 6.5, the secondary star is 0.78 times as massive as the Sun. It has been identified as a blue straggler, and has either accumulated material from, or merged with, a third star in the past. It is a strong source of X-rays. The pair is 46.4 ± 0.3 light-years distant from Earth.

Beta Fornacis is a yellow-hued giant star of spectral type G8IIIb of magnitude 4.5 that has cooled and swelled to 11 times the Sun's diameter, 178 ± 2 light-years from Earth. It is a red clump giant, which means it has undergone helium flash and is currently generating energy through the fusion of helium at its core.

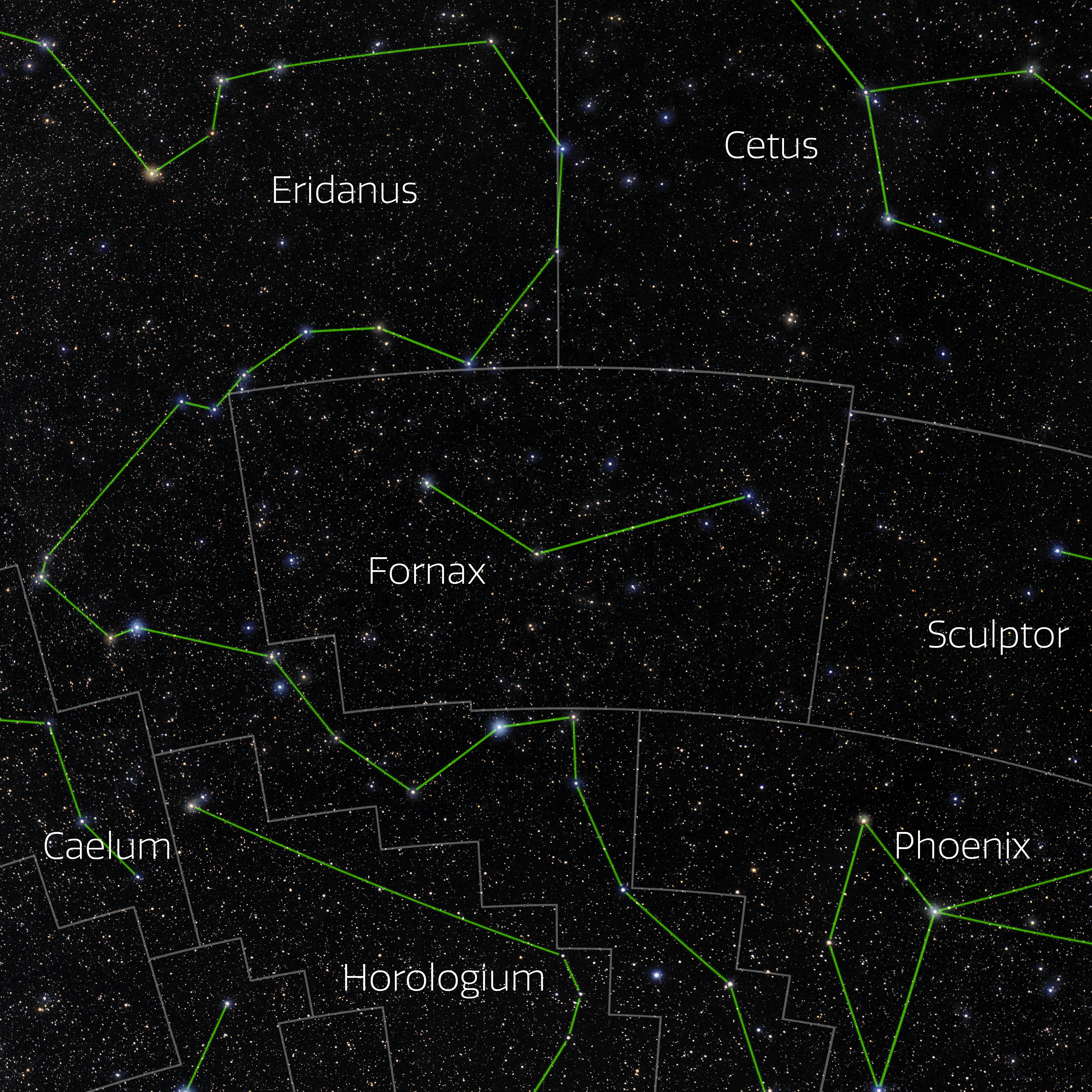
The constellation Fornax showing the IAU boundaries, the constellation stick figure, and labels for its brightest stars. Astrophotograph by Eckhard Slawik, from NOIRLab's 88 Constellations project.

Nu Fornacis is 370 ± 10 light-years distant from Earth. It is a blue giant star of spectral type B9.5IIIspSi that is 3.65 ± 0.18 times as massive and around 245 times as luminous as the Sun, with 3.2 ± 0.4 times its diameter. It varies in luminosity over a period of 1.89 days—the same as its rotational period. This is because of differences in abundances of metals in its atmosphere; it belongs to a class of star known as an Alpha^{2} Canum Venaticorum variable.

Shining with an apparent magnitude of 5.89, Epsilon Fornacis is a binary star system located 104.4 ± 0.3 light-years distant from Earth. Its component stars orbit each other every 37 years. The primary star is around 12 billion years old and has cooled and expanded to 2.53 times the diameter of the Sun, while having only 91% of its mass. Omega Fornacis is a binary star system composed of a blue main-sequence star of spectral type B9.5V and magnitude 4.96, and a white main sequence star of spectral type A7V and magnitude 7.88. The system is 470 ± 10 light-years distant from Earth.

Kappa Fornacis is a triple star system composed of a yellow giant and a pair of red dwarfs.

R Fornacis is a long-period variable and carbon star.

LP 944-20 is a brown dwarf of spectral type M9 that has around 7% the mass of the Sun. Approximately 21 light-years distant from Earth, it is a faint object with an apparent magnitude of 18.69. Observations published in 2007 showed that the atmosphere of LP 944-20 contains much lithium and that it has dusty clouds. Smaller and less luminous still is 2MASS 0243-2453, a T-type brown dwarf of spectral type T6. With a surface temperature of 1040–1100 K, it has 2.4–4.1% the mass of the Sun, a diameter 9.2 to 10.6% of that of the Sun, and an age of 0.4–1.7 billion years.

Six star systems in Fornax have been found to have planets:

- Lambda^{2} Fornacis is a star about 1.2 times as massive as the Sun with a planet about as massive as Neptune, discovered by doppler spectroscopy in 2009. The planet has an orbit of around 17.24 days.
- HD 20868 is an orange dwarf with a mass around 78% that of the Sun, 151 ± 10 light-years away from Earth. It was found to have an orbiting planet approximately double the mass of Jupiter with a period of 380 days.
- WASP-72 is a star around 1.4 times as massive that has begun to cool and expand off the main sequence, reaching double the Sun's diameter. It has a planet around as massive as Jupiter orbiting it every 2.2 days.
- HD 20781 and HD 20782 are a pair of sunlike yellow main sequence stars that orbit each other. Each has been found to have planets.
- HR 858 is a near naked eye visible star in Fornax, 31.3 parsecs away. In May 2019, it was announced to have at least 3 exoplanets as observed by transit method of the Transiting Exoplanet Survey Satellite.

=== Deep-sky objects ===
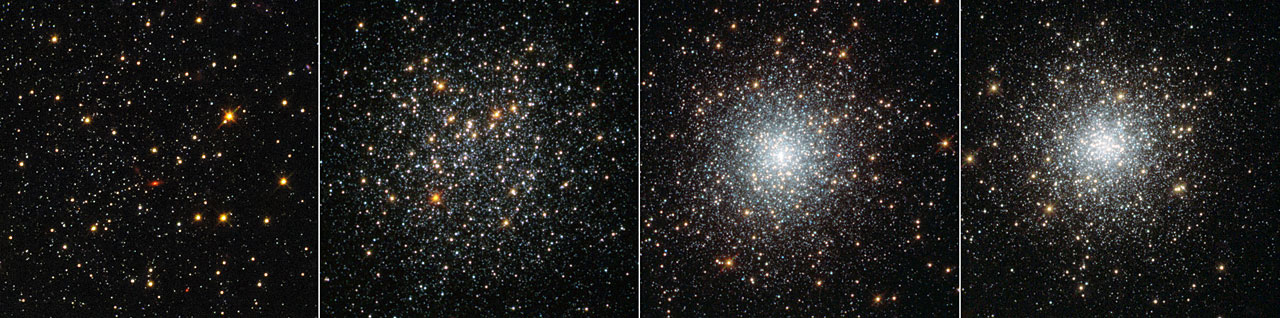
Four globular clusters in Fornax.

Local Group

NGC 1049 is a globular cluster 500,000 light-years from Earth. It is in the Fornax Dwarf Galaxy. NGC 1360 is a planetary nebula in Fornax with a magnitude of approximately 9.0, 1,280 light-years from Earth. Its central star is of magnitude 11.4, an unusually bright specimen. It is five times the size of the famed Ring Nebula in Lyra at 6.5 arcminutes. Unlike the Ring Nebula, NGC 1360 is clearly elliptical.

The Fornax Dwarf galaxy is a dwarf galaxy that is part of the Local Group of galaxies. It is not visible in amateur telescopes, despite its relatively small distance of 500,000 light-years.

Helmi stream is a small galactic stream in Fornax. This small galaxy was destroyed by the Milky Way 6 billion years ago. There was candidate for extragalactic planet, HIP 13044 b.

Outside

NGC 1097 is a barred spiral galaxy in Fornax, about 45 million light-years from Earth. At magnitude 9, it is visible in medium amateur telescopes. It is notable as a Seyfert galaxy with strong spectral emissions indicating ionized gases and a central supermassive black hole.

Fornax Cluster

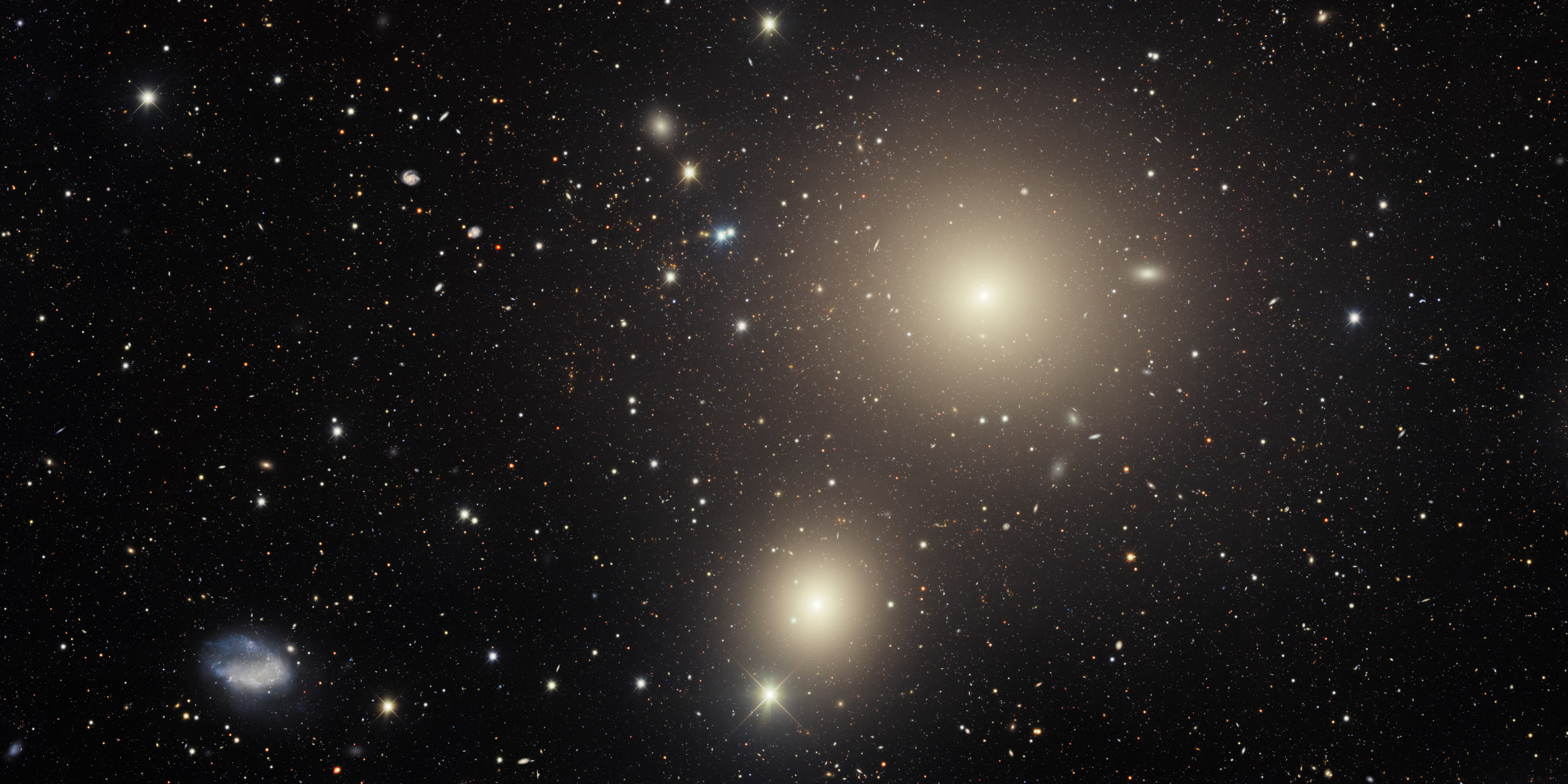
Galaxies in the Fornax Cluster

The Fornax Cluster is a cluster of galaxies lying at a distance of 19 megaparsecs (62 million light-years). It is the second richest galaxy cluster within 100 million light-years, after the considerably larger Virgo Cluster, and may be associated with the nearby Eridanus Group. It lies primarily in the constellation Fornax, with its southern boundaries partially crossing into the constellation of Eridanus, and covers an area of sky about 6° across or about 28 sq degrees. The Fornax Cluster is a part of larger Fornax Wall. Down are some famous objects in this cluster:

NGC 1365 is another barred spiral galaxy located at a distance of 56 million light-years from Earth. Like NGC 1097, it is also a Seyfert galaxy. Its bar is a center of star formation and shows extensions of the spiral arms' dust lanes. The bright nucleus indicates the presence of an active galactic nucleus – a galaxy with a supermassive black hole at the center, accreting matter from the bar. It is a 10th magnitude galaxy associated with the Fornax Cluster.

Fornax A is a radio galaxy with extensive radio lobes that corresponds to the optical galaxy NGC 1316, a 9th-magnitude galaxy. One of the closer active galaxies to Earth at a distance of 62 million light-years, Fornax A appears in the optical spectrum as a large elliptical galaxy with dust lanes near its core. These dust lanes have caused astronomers to discern that it recently merged with a small spiral galaxy. Because it has a high rate of type Ia supernovae, NGC 1316 has been used to determine the size of the universe. The jets producing the radio lobes are not particularly powerful, giving the lobes a more diffuse, knotted structure due to interactions with the intergalactic medium. Associated with this peculiar galaxy is an entire cluster of galaxies.

NGC 1399 is a large elliptical galaxy in the Southern constellation Fornax, the central galaxy in the Fornax Cluster. The galaxy is 66 million light-years away from Earth. With a diameter of 130 000 light-years, it is one of the largest galaxies in the Fornax Cluster and slightly larger than Milky Way. William Herschel discovered this galaxy on October 22, 1835.

NGC 1386 is a spiral galaxy located in the constellation Eridanus. It is located at a distance of circa 53 million light years from Earth and has apparent dimensions of 3.89' x 1.349'. It is a Seyfert galaxy, the only one in Fornax Cluster.

NGC 1427A is an irregular galaxy in the constellation Eridanus. Its distance modulus has been estimated using the globular cluster luminosity function to be 31.01 ± 0.21 which is about 52 Mly. It is the brightest dwarf irregular member of the Fornax Cluster and is in the foreground of the cluster's central galaxy NGC 1399.

NGC 1460 is a barred lenticular galaxy in the constellation Eridanus. It was discovered by John Herschel on November 28, 1837. It is moving away from the Milky Way 1341 km/s. NGC 1460 has a Hubble classification of SB0, which indicates it is a barred lenticular galaxy. But, this one contains a huge bar at its core. The bar is spreading from center to the edge of the galaxy, as seen on Hubble image in the box. This bar is one of the largest seen in barred lenticular galaxies.

There are also first ultracompact dwarf galaxies discovered.

Distant universe

Fornax has been the target of investigations into the furthest reaches of the universe. The Hubble Ultra Deep Field is located within Fornax, and the Fornax Cluster, a small cluster of galaxies, lies primarily within Fornax. At a meeting of the Royal Astronomical Society in Britain, a team from University of Queensland described 40 unknown "dwarf" galaxies in this constellation; follow-up observations with the Hubble Space Telescope and the European Southern Observatory's Very Large Telescope revealed that ultra compact dwarfs are much smaller than previously known dwarf galaxies, about 120 light-years (37 pc) across.

UDFj-39546284 is a candidate protogalaxy located in Fornax, although recent analyses have suggested it is likely to be a lower redshift source.

GRB 190114C was a notable gamma ray burst explosion from a galaxy 4.5 billion light years away near the Fornax constellation, that was initially detected in January 2019. According to astronomers, "the brightest light ever seen from Earth [to date] ... [the] biggest explosion in the Universe since the Big Bang".

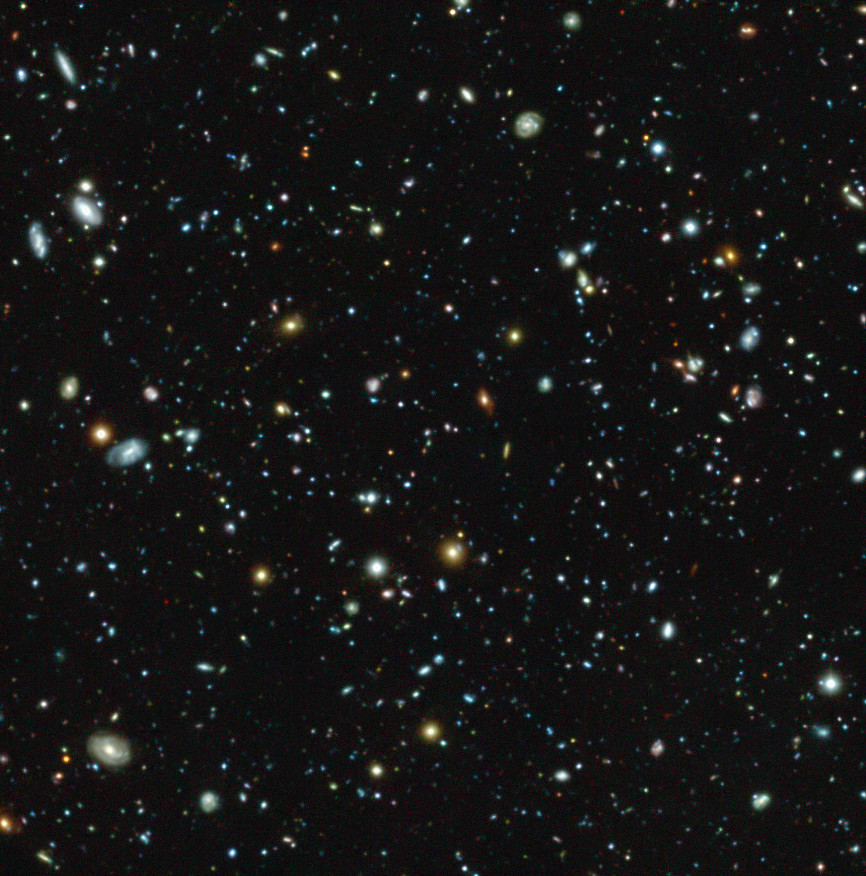
The Hubble Ultra Deep Field seen with MUSE.

A video introduce the Hubble Ultra Deep Field and its location near Fornax

== Equivalents ==
In Chinese astronomy, the stars that correspond to Fornax are within the White Tiger of the West (西方白虎, Xī Fāng Bái Hǔ).

== See also ==
- Fornax (Chinese astronomy)
