= List of minor planets: 547001–548000 =

The following is a partial list of minor planets, running from minor-planet number 547001 through 548000, inclusive. The primary data for this and other partial lists is based on JPL's "Small-Body Orbital Elements" and data available from the Minor Planet Center. Critical list information is also provided by the MPC, unless otherwise specified from Lowell Observatory. A detailed description of the table's columns and additional sources are given on the main page including a complete list of every page in this series, and a statistical break-up on the dynamical classification of minor planets.

Also see the summary list of all named bodies in numerical and alphabetical order, and the corresponding naming citations for the number range of this particular list. New namings may only be added to this list after official publication, as the preannouncement of names is condemned by the Working Group for Small Bodies Nomenclature of the International Astronomical Union.

Near-Earth obj.	MBA (inner)	MBA (outer)	Centaur
Mars-crosser	MBA (middle)	Jupiter trojan	Trans-Neptunian obj.
Unclassified

== 547001–547100 ==
Designation			Discovery			Properties		Ref
Permanent	Provisional	Named after	Date	Site	Discoverer(s)	Category	Diam.	Ref
547001	2010 CT_{38}	—	February 13, 2010	Mount Lemmon	Mount Lemmon Survey	NYS	1.2 km	MPC · JPL
547002	2010 CA_{39}	—	March 24, 2003	Kitt Peak	Spacewatch	V	760 m	MPC · JPL
547003	2010 CE_{40}	—	February 13, 2010	Mount Lemmon	Mount Lemmon Survey	·	1.9 km	MPC · JPL
547004	2010 CV_{43}	—	January 11, 2010	Kitt Peak	Spacewatch	·	3.1 km	MPC · JPL
547005	2010 CL_{56}	—	February 12, 2010	Socorro	LINEAR	·	3.5 km	MPC · JPL
547006	2010 CN_{58}	—	January 11, 2010	Kitt Peak	Spacewatch	H	580 m	MPC · JPL
547007	2010 CH_{62}	—	January 6, 2006	Mount Lemmon	Mount Lemmon Survey	·	1.2 km	MPC · JPL
547008	2010 CC_{66}	—	April 4, 2005	Mount Lemmon	Mount Lemmon Survey	·	2.2 km	MPC · JPL
547009	2010 CG_{67}	—	February 10, 2010	Kitt Peak	Spacewatch	·	2.7 km	MPC · JPL
547010	2010 CT_{68}	—	January 11, 2010	Kitt Peak	Spacewatch	·	3.4 km	MPC · JPL
547011	2010 CG_{70}	—	February 2, 2005	Kitt Peak	Spacewatch	·	3.9 km	MPC · JPL
547012	2010 CP_{70}	—	August 18, 2002	Palomar	NEAT	·	3.2 km	MPC · JPL
547013	2010 CY_{70}	—	February 13, 2010	Mount Lemmon	Mount Lemmon Survey	·	2.6 km	MPC · JPL
547014	2010 CN_{71}	—	November 3, 2005	Mount Lemmon	Mount Lemmon Survey	V	530 m	MPC · JPL
547015	2010 CK_{72}	—	February 13, 2010	Mount Lemmon	Mount Lemmon Survey	·	2.3 km	MPC · JPL
547016	2010 CV_{72}	—	February 13, 2010	Mount Lemmon	Mount Lemmon Survey	·	3.5 km	MPC · JPL
547017	2010 CL_{73}	—	September 21, 2008	Kitt Peak	Spacewatch	·	2.2 km	MPC · JPL
547018	2010 CY_{75}	—	February 13, 2010	Catalina	CSS	·	1.3 km	MPC · JPL
547019	2010 CG_{77}	—	February 13, 2010	Mount Lemmon	Mount Lemmon Survey	THB	2.0 km	MPC · JPL
547020	2010 CN_{77}	—	February 13, 2010	Mount Lemmon	Mount Lemmon Survey	·	1.4 km	MPC · JPL
547021	2010 CR_{77}	—	January 8, 2010	Mount Lemmon	Mount Lemmon Survey	·	3.2 km	MPC · JPL
547022	2010 CS_{80}	—	February 13, 2010	Mount Lemmon	Mount Lemmon Survey	·	2.5 km	MPC · JPL
547023	2010 CT_{83}	—	September 6, 2008	Kitt Peak	Spacewatch	·	1.1 km	MPC · JPL
547024	2010 CD_{86}	—	January 11, 2010	Mount Lemmon	Mount Lemmon Survey	VER	3.3 km	MPC · JPL
547025	2010 CG_{86}	—	February 14, 2010	Mount Lemmon	Mount Lemmon Survey	THM	1.8 km	MPC · JPL
547026	2010 CL_{87}	—	January 17, 2010	Kitt Peak	Spacewatch	·	2.4 km	MPC · JPL
547027	2010 CP_{87}	—	February 14, 2010	Mount Lemmon	Mount Lemmon Survey	·	2.5 km	MPC · JPL
547028	2010 CA_{89}	—	February 14, 2010	Mount Lemmon	Mount Lemmon Survey	EOS	1.8 km	MPC · JPL
547029	2010 CO_{89}	—	October 31, 2008	Kitt Peak	Spacewatch	·	2.8 km	MPC · JPL
547030	2010 CE_{91}	—	February 14, 2010	Mount Lemmon	Mount Lemmon Survey	·	2.3 km	MPC · JPL
547031	2010 CQ_{95}	—	September 27, 2008	Mount Lemmon	Mount Lemmon Survey	·	2.3 km	MPC · JPL
547032	2010 CB_{96}	—	February 14, 2010	Mount Lemmon	Mount Lemmon Survey	·	3.2 km	MPC · JPL
547033	2010 CK_{96}	—	February 14, 2010	Mount Lemmon	Mount Lemmon Survey	·	2.9 km	MPC · JPL
547034	2010 CG_{97}	—	January 11, 2010	Kitt Peak	Spacewatch	·	3.2 km	MPC · JPL
547035	2010 CP_{98}	—	October 10, 2008	Kitt Peak	Spacewatch	THM	1.5 km	MPC · JPL
547036	2010 CS_{98}	—	January 11, 2010	Kitt Peak	Spacewatch	EOS	1.6 km	MPC · JPL
547037	2010 CN_{100}	—	February 14, 2010	Mount Lemmon	Mount Lemmon Survey	NYS	990 m	MPC · JPL
547038	2010 CT_{102}	—	February 14, 2010	Mount Lemmon	Mount Lemmon Survey	·	2.3 km	MPC · JPL
547039	2010 CW_{104}	—	February 14, 2010	Mount Lemmon	Mount Lemmon Survey	·	2.5 km	MPC · JPL
547040	2010 CW_{106}	—	April 30, 2006	Kitt Peak	Spacewatch	·	2.5 km	MPC · JPL
547041	2010 CJ_{107}	—	February 14, 2010	Mount Lemmon	Mount Lemmon Survey	VER	2.0 km	MPC · JPL
547042	2010 CQ_{107}	—	February 14, 2010	Kitt Peak	Spacewatch	·	960 m	MPC · JPL
547043	2010 CV_{107}	—	February 14, 2010	Catalina	CSS	·	3.4 km	MPC · JPL
547044	2010 CF_{110}	—	September 12, 2007	Mount Lemmon	Mount Lemmon Survey	·	2.7 km	MPC · JPL
547045	2010 CT_{110}	—	November 1, 2008	Kitt Peak	Spacewatch	·	2.0 km	MPC · JPL
547046	2010 CZ_{110}	—	December 20, 2009	Mount Lemmon	Mount Lemmon Survey	·	2.2 km	MPC · JPL
547047	2010 CM_{111}	—	February 14, 2010	Mount Lemmon	Mount Lemmon Survey	·	990 m	MPC · JPL
547048	2010 CE_{112}	—	September 14, 2007	Mount Lemmon	Mount Lemmon Survey	·	2.4 km	MPC · JPL
547049	2010 CH_{113}	—	September 13, 2007	Mount Lemmon	Mount Lemmon Survey	·	2.9 km	MPC · JPL
547050	2010 CJ_{113}	—	September 12, 2007	Mount Lemmon	Mount Lemmon Survey	·	2.2 km	MPC · JPL
547051	2010 CF_{115}	—	February 14, 2010	Mount Lemmon	Mount Lemmon Survey	·	2.2 km	MPC · JPL
547052	2010 CT_{115}	—	February 14, 2010	Mount Lemmon	Mount Lemmon Survey	MAS	660 m	MPC · JPL
547053	2010 CF_{116}	—	September 13, 2007	Mount Lemmon	Mount Lemmon Survey	·	3.1 km	MPC · JPL
547054	2010 CK_{116}	—	January 21, 2002	Kitt Peak	Spacewatch	·	980 m	MPC · JPL
547055	2010 CA_{122}	—	February 15, 2010	Mount Lemmon	Mount Lemmon Survey	·	2.9 km	MPC · JPL
547056	2010 CV_{123}	—	February 15, 2010	Mount Lemmon	Mount Lemmon Survey	·	2.2 km	MPC · JPL
547057	2010 CC_{124}	—	February 15, 2010	Kitt Peak	Spacewatch	·	3.3 km	MPC · JPL
547058	2010 CS_{127}	—	February 15, 2010	Mount Lemmon	Mount Lemmon Survey	URS	2.8 km	MPC · JPL
547059	2010 CB_{128}	—	February 7, 2010	La Sagra	OAM	H	490 m	MPC · JPL
547060	2010 CG_{128}	—	October 23, 2003	Apache Point	SDSS	·	4.1 km	MPC · JPL
547061	2010 CR_{137}	—	February 6, 2010	Mount Lemmon	Mount Lemmon Survey	MAS	710 m	MPC · JPL
547062	2010 CW_{137}	—	February 9, 2010	Kitt Peak	Spacewatch	·	910 m	MPC · JPL
547063	2010 CN_{138}	—	February 13, 2010	Mount Lemmon	Mount Lemmon Survey	T_{j} (2.94)	3.5 km	MPC · JPL
547064	2010 CU_{138}	—	September 21, 2008	Mount Lemmon	Mount Lemmon Survey	·	2.6 km	MPC · JPL
547065	2010 CX_{146}	—	February 13, 2010	Kitt Peak	Spacewatch	·	1.3 km	MPC · JPL
547066	2010 CF_{147}	—	February 13, 2010	Mount Lemmon	Mount Lemmon Survey	EOS	2.2 km	MPC · JPL
547067	2010 CK_{148}	—	March 8, 2005	Anderson Mesa	LONEOS	·	3.5 km	MPC · JPL
547068	2010 CM_{148}	—	October 19, 2008	Kitt Peak	Spacewatch	·	1.0 km	MPC · JPL
547069	2010 CO_{148}	—	January 11, 2010	Mount Lemmon	Mount Lemmon Survey	·	2.9 km	MPC · JPL
547070	2010 CV_{151}	—	February 14, 2010	Kitt Peak	Spacewatch	·	2.2 km	MPC · JPL
547071	2010 CZ_{151}	—	September 19, 2008	Kitt Peak	Spacewatch	V	580 m	MPC · JPL
547072	2010 CS_{152}	—	February 14, 2010	Mount Lemmon	Mount Lemmon Survey	·	2.8 km	MPC · JPL
547073	2010 CB_{155}	—	September 12, 2001	Kitt Peak	Deep Ecliptic Survey	NYS	830 m	MPC · JPL
547074	2010 CJ_{155}	—	February 15, 2010	Kitt Peak	Spacewatch	·	2.7 km	MPC · JPL
547075	2010 CR_{156}	—	October 20, 2008	Mount Lemmon	Mount Lemmon Survey	·	1.0 km	MPC · JPL
547076	2010 CT_{156}	—	February 15, 2010	Mount Lemmon	Mount Lemmon Survey	·	1.0 km	MPC · JPL
547077	2010 CQ_{157}	—	January 9, 2006	Kitt Peak	Spacewatch	·	900 m	MPC · JPL
547078	2010 CC_{158}	—	November 1, 2005	Mount Lemmon	Mount Lemmon Survey	·	770 m	MPC · JPL
547079	2010 CO_{158}	—	February 15, 2010	Mount Lemmon	Mount Lemmon Survey	·	1.2 km	MPC · JPL
547080	2010 CV_{159}	—	September 8, 2000	Kitt Peak	Spacewatch	·	1.3 km	MPC · JPL
547081	2010 CW_{159}	—	March 4, 2006	Kitt Peak	Spacewatch	·	1.4 km	MPC · JPL
547082	2010 CV_{160}	—	February 13, 2010	Mount Lemmon	Mount Lemmon Survey	·	2.6 km	MPC · JPL
547083	2010 CK_{161}	—	February 5, 2010	Kitt Peak	Spacewatch	·	2.7 km	MPC · JPL
547084	2010 CF_{163}	—	January 5, 2010	Kitt Peak	Spacewatch	·	3.5 km	MPC · JPL
547085	2010 CJ_{163}	—	January 2, 2006	Mount Lemmon	Mount Lemmon Survey	·	1.3 km	MPC · JPL
547086	2010 CC_{164}	—	February 10, 2010	Kitt Peak	Spacewatch	EOS	1.7 km	MPC · JPL
547087	2010 CS_{164}	—	February 10, 2010	Kitt Peak	Spacewatch	·	2.7 km	MPC · JPL
547088	2010 CP_{169}	—	February 9, 2010	Kitt Peak	Spacewatch	·	2.9 km	MPC · JPL
547089	2010 CA_{170}	—	January 11, 2010	Kitt Peak	Spacewatch	·	3.0 km	MPC · JPL
547090	2010 CO_{170}	—	February 13, 2010	Mount Lemmon	Mount Lemmon Survey	·	2.3 km	MPC · JPL
547091	2010 CT_{171}	—	November 3, 2008	Mount Lemmon	Mount Lemmon Survey	·	1.1 km	MPC · JPL
547092	2010 CU_{172}	—	October 23, 2005	Kitt Peak	Spacewatch	MAS	700 m	MPC · JPL
547093	2010 CB_{174}	—	May 13, 1996	Kitt Peak	Spacewatch	MAS	530 m	MPC · JPL
547094	2010 CN_{175}	—	January 11, 2010	Kitt Peak	Spacewatch	T_{j} (2.98)	2.6 km	MPC · JPL
547095	2010 CJ_{176}	—	February 10, 2010	Kitt Peak	Spacewatch	·	2.0 km	MPC · JPL
547096	2010 CK_{176}	—	January 12, 2010	Kitt Peak	Spacewatch	VER	3.0 km	MPC · JPL
547097	2010 CO_{177}	—	February 10, 2010	Kitt Peak	Spacewatch	·	2.5 km	MPC · JPL
547098	2010 CN_{249}	—	February 13, 2010	Palomar	Palomar Transient Factory	EOS	1.8 km	MPC · JPL
547099	2010 CX_{250}	—	October 27, 2008	Kitt Peak	Spacewatch	EOS	1.9 km	MPC · JPL
547100	2010 CB_{251}	—	April 28, 2011	Haleakala	Pan-STARRS 1	·	2.8 km	MPC · JPL

== 547101–547200 ==
back to top

Designation			Discovery			Properties		Ref
Permanent	Provisional	Named after	Date	Site	Discoverer(s)	Category	Diam.	Ref
547101	2010 CE_{259}	—	January 27, 2017	Haleakala	Pan-STARRS 1	·	2.6 km	MPC · JPL
547102	2010 CX_{270}	—	December 13, 2015	Haleakala	Pan-STARRS 1	LIX	3.6 km	MPC · JPL
547103	2010 CL_{271}	—	December 12, 2014	Haleakala	Pan-STARRS 1	·	3.1 km	MPC · JPL
547104	2010 CQ_{271}	—	August 17, 1995	Kitt Peak	Spacewatch	EUN	1.2 km	MPC · JPL
547105	2010 CS_{271}	—	March 7, 2016	Haleakala	Pan-STARRS 1	ELF	3.4 km	MPC · JPL
547106	2010 CD_{272}	—	October 24, 2013	Haleakala	Pan-STARRS 1	·	2.6 km	MPC · JPL
547107	2010 CF_{272}	—	August 15, 2013	Haleakala	Pan-STARRS 1	·	2.1 km	MPC · JPL
547108	2010 CM_{272}	—	February 16, 2016	Mount Lemmon	Mount Lemmon Survey	T_{j} (2.99) · EUP	2.9 km	MPC · JPL
547109	2010 CQ_{272}	—	October 2, 2013	Mount Lemmon	Mount Lemmon Survey	·	2.8 km	MPC · JPL
547110	2010 CR_{272}	—	November 26, 2014	Haleakala	Pan-STARRS 1	ARM	2.4 km	MPC · JPL
547111	2010 CT_{272}	—	February 13, 2010	Mount Lemmon	Mount Lemmon Survey	·	2.3 km	MPC · JPL
547112	2010 CA_{274}	—	August 15, 2013	Haleakala	Pan-STARRS 1	·	2.4 km	MPC · JPL
547113	2010 CJ_{274}	—	October 4, 2007	Mount Lemmon	Mount Lemmon Survey	·	2.8 km	MPC · JPL
547114	2010 CE_{275}	—	February 15, 2010	Mount Lemmon	Mount Lemmon Survey	AGN	930 m	MPC · JPL
547115	2010 DU_{2}	—	July 17, 2007	La Sagra	OAM	·	3.7 km	MPC · JPL
547116	2010 DA_{4}	—	February 5, 2010	Catalina	CSS	·	2.5 km	MPC · JPL
547117	2010 DM_{4}	—	February 16, 2010	Mount Lemmon	Mount Lemmon Survey	·	1.3 km	MPC · JPL
547118	2010 DJ_{5}	—	February 16, 2010	Mount Lemmon	Mount Lemmon Survey	·	3.3 km	MPC · JPL
547119	2010 DM_{5}	—	September 15, 2007	Mount Lemmon	Mount Lemmon Survey	·	2.8 km	MPC · JPL
547120	2010 DP_{5}	—	December 30, 2005	Kitt Peak	Spacewatch	PHO	790 m	MPC · JPL
547121	2010 DW_{5}	—	April 25, 2003	Kitt Peak	Spacewatch	MAS	940 m	MPC · JPL
547122	2010 DC_{6}	—	February 16, 2010	Mount Lemmon	Mount Lemmon Survey	·	2.1 km	MPC · JPL
547123	2010 DM_{6}	—	February 16, 2010	Kitt Peak	Spacewatch	TIR	2.2 km	MPC · JPL
547124	2010 DE_{9}	—	February 16, 2010	Mount Lemmon	Mount Lemmon Survey	·	1.9 km	MPC · JPL
547125	2010 DA_{10}	—	January 15, 2010	Kitt Peak	Spacewatch	H	560 m	MPC · JPL
547126	2010 DK_{10}	—	December 20, 2009	Mount Lemmon	Mount Lemmon Survey	·	2.5 km	MPC · JPL
547127	2010 DM_{10}	—	September 25, 2008	Mount Lemmon	Mount Lemmon Survey	·	3.3 km	MPC · JPL
547128	2010 DN_{11}	—	October 6, 2008	Mount Lemmon	Mount Lemmon Survey	V	710 m	MPC · JPL
547129	2010 DA_{12}	—	December 22, 2008	Kitt Peak	Spacewatch	·	3.1 km	MPC · JPL
547130	2010 DO_{21}	—	February 5, 2010	Catalina	CSS	·	2.7 km	MPC · JPL
547131	2010 DR_{34}	—	February 17, 2010	Kitt Peak	Spacewatch	·	1.3 km	MPC · JPL
547132	2010 DC_{35}	—	December 7, 2005	Kitt Peak	Spacewatch	·	950 m	MPC · JPL
547133	2010 DP_{35}	—	November 12, 2001	Apache Point	SDSS Collaboration	·	1.0 km	MPC · JPL
547134	2010 DQ_{35}	—	September 23, 2004	Kitt Peak	Spacewatch	MAS	770 m	MPC · JPL
547135	2010 DU_{37}	—	February 16, 2010	Kitt Peak	Spacewatch	·	2.4 km	MPC · JPL
547136	2010 DV_{41}	—	February 17, 2010	Mount Lemmon	Mount Lemmon Survey	·	2.1 km	MPC · JPL
547137	2010 DG_{45}	—	February 17, 2010	Kitt Peak	Spacewatch	·	2.0 km	MPC · JPL
547138	2010 DS_{45}	—	February 17, 2010	Kitt Peak	Spacewatch	·	2.9 km	MPC · JPL
547139	2010 DJ_{46}	—	February 17, 2010	Kitt Peak	Spacewatch	·	790 m	MPC · JPL
547140	2010 DD_{47}	—	February 17, 2010	Mount Lemmon	Mount Lemmon Survey	·	1.5 km	MPC · JPL
547141	2010 DG_{47}	—	February 17, 2010	Mount Lemmon	Mount Lemmon Survey	·	1.1 km	MPC · JPL
547142	2010 DV_{75}	—	February 18, 2010	Mount Lemmon	Mount Lemmon Survey	MAS	600 m	MPC · JPL
547143	2010 DH_{76}	—	February 19, 2010	Kitt Peak	Spacewatch	·	3.2 km	MPC · JPL
547144	2010 DA_{77}	—	December 7, 2005	Kitt Peak	Spacewatch	·	1.4 km	MPC · JPL
547145	2010 DZ_{91}	—	February 16, 2010	Palomar	Palomar Transient Factory	·	1.2 km	MPC · JPL
547146	2010 DE_{92}	—	January 5, 2010	Kitt Peak	Spacewatch	·	3.5 km	MPC · JPL
547147	2010 DM_{95}	—	February 14, 2005	Kitt Peak	Spacewatch	·	2.2 km	MPC · JPL
547148	2010 DR_{103}	—	January 1, 2008	Kitt Peak	Spacewatch	3:2	6.6 km	MPC · JPL
547149	2010 DR_{105}	—	October 11, 2007	Mount Lemmon	Mount Lemmon Survey	KON	2.4 km	MPC · JPL
547150	2010 DV_{106}	—	February 17, 2010	Mount Lemmon	Mount Lemmon Survey	MAR	1.3 km	MPC · JPL
547151	2010 DW_{106}	—	October 24, 2013	Mount Lemmon	Mount Lemmon Survey	PHO	1 km	MPC · JPL
547152	2010 DB_{107}	—	March 18, 2016	Mount Lemmon	Mount Lemmon Survey	·	2.5 km	MPC · JPL
547153	2010 DL_{107}	—	February 3, 2016	Haleakala	Pan-STARRS 1	·	2.6 km	MPC · JPL
547154	2010 DR_{108}	—	February 14, 2016	Haleakala	Pan-STARRS 1	·	3.2 km	MPC · JPL
547155	2010 DT_{108}	—	April 28, 2011	Kitt Peak	Spacewatch	·	3.3 km	MPC · JPL
547156	2010 DU_{108}	—	February 16, 2010	Kitt Peak	Spacewatch	VER	2.6 km	MPC · JPL
547157	2010 DV_{108}	—	August 9, 2013	Haleakala	Pan-STARRS 1	·	2.6 km	MPC · JPL
547158	2010 DB_{109}	—	January 16, 2010	Kitt Peak	Spacewatch	·	2.4 km	MPC · JPL
547159	2010 DS_{109}	—	February 17, 2010	Kitt Peak	Spacewatch	·	2.5 km	MPC · JPL
547160	2010 DU_{109}	—	September 13, 2013	Mount Lemmon	Mount Lemmon Survey	EOS	1.5 km	MPC · JPL
547161	2010 DT_{110}	—	August 14, 2013	Haleakala	Pan-STARRS 1	EOS	1.6 km	MPC · JPL
547162	2010 DV_{111}	—	September 14, 2013	Kitt Peak	Spacewatch	·	2.4 km	MPC · JPL
547163	2010 DX_{111}	—	February 18, 2010	Kitt Peak	Spacewatch	·	1.0 km	MPC · JPL
547164	2010 EO_{12}	—	March 8, 2010	Taunus	Karge, S., E. Schwab	·	1.1 km	MPC · JPL
547165	2010 EZ_{20}	—	March 6, 2010	Plana	Fratev, F.	EOS	2.2 km	MPC · JPL
547166	2010 EL_{29}	—	November 7, 2008	Mount Lemmon	Mount Lemmon Survey	·	3.3 km	MPC · JPL
547167	2010 EG_{30}	—	February 14, 2010	Mount Lemmon	Mount Lemmon Survey	·	2.1 km	MPC · JPL
547168	2010 ES_{31}	—	February 9, 2010	Kitt Peak	Spacewatch	·	2.7 km	MPC · JPL
547169	2010 EM_{42}	—	March 14, 2010	Pla D'Arguines	R. Ferrando, Ferrando, M.	·	4.2 km	MPC · JPL
547170	2010 EL_{44}	—	February 14, 2010	Catalina	CSS	·	1.3 km	MPC · JPL
547171	2010 EB_{66}	—	March 13, 2010	Dauban	C. Rinner, Kugel, F.	URS	3.0 km	MPC · JPL
547172	2010 EQ_{66}	—	February 17, 2010	Kitt Peak	Spacewatch	·	3.1 km	MPC · JPL
547173	2010 EP_{68}	—	October 21, 1995	Kitt Peak	Spacewatch	·	3.0 km	MPC · JPL
547174	2010 EN_{74}	—	May 25, 2006	Mount Lemmon	Mount Lemmon Survey	·	3.0 km	MPC · JPL
547175	2010 EW_{74}	—	March 12, 2010	Kitt Peak	Spacewatch	·	1.1 km	MPC · JPL
547176	2010 EH_{76}	—	March 12, 2010	Catalina	CSS	·	2.4 km	MPC · JPL
547177	2010 EF_{78}	—	March 12, 2010	Mount Lemmon	Mount Lemmon Survey	·	1.2 km	MPC · JPL
547178	2010 EA_{79}	—	October 6, 2008	Mount Lemmon	Mount Lemmon Survey	·	1.1 km	MPC · JPL
547179	2010 EK_{79}	—	October 15, 2007	Mount Lemmon	Mount Lemmon Survey	·	1.2 km	MPC · JPL
547180	2010 EE_{80}	—	January 7, 2006	Kitt Peak	Spacewatch	MAS	600 m	MPC · JPL
547181	2010 EX_{87}	—	October 7, 2004	Kitt Peak	Spacewatch	PHO	1.0 km	MPC · JPL
547182	2010 ET_{91}	—	March 14, 2010	Kitt Peak	Spacewatch	·	1.0 km	MPC · JPL
547183	2010 ER_{92}	—	March 4, 2010	Kitt Peak	Spacewatch	·	1.5 km	MPC · JPL
547184	2010 EM_{97}	—	February 18, 2010	Mount Lemmon	Mount Lemmon Survey	·	3.6 km	MPC · JPL
547185	2010 EO_{98}	—	March 14, 2010	Kitt Peak	Spacewatch	·	1.3 km	MPC · JPL
547186	2010 EO_{99}	—	March 14, 2010	Kitt Peak	Spacewatch	·	1.0 km	MPC · JPL
547187	2010 EG_{102}	—	February 22, 2004	Kitt Peak	Spacewatch	VER	2.7 km	MPC · JPL
547188	2010 EB_{108}	—	October 2, 2008	Kitt Peak	Spacewatch	NYS	1.2 km	MPC · JPL
547189	2010 EX_{121}	—	March 15, 2010	Kitt Peak	Spacewatch	H	480 m	MPC · JPL
547190	2010 EN_{123}	—	December 8, 2005	Kitt Peak	Spacewatch	MAS	800 m	MPC · JPL
547191	2010 ER_{129}	—	March 13, 2010	Kitt Peak	Spacewatch	·	870 m	MPC · JPL
547192	2010 EY_{135}	—	March 14, 2010	Kitt Peak	Spacewatch	·	1.6 km	MPC · JPL
547193	2010 EQ_{136}	—	January 24, 2015	Haleakala	Pan-STARRS 1	EUP	3.5 km	MPC · JPL
547194	2010 ED_{143}	—	May 3, 2005	Kitt Peak	Spacewatch	HYG	2.9 km	MPC · JPL
547195	2010 EP_{171}	—	June 12, 2007	Kitt Peak	Spacewatch	·	1.6 km	MPC · JPL
547196	2010 EO_{174}	—	August 22, 2014	Haleakala	Pan-STARRS 1	·	2.9 km	MPC · JPL
547197	2010 EP_{176}	—	September 20, 2003	Kitt Peak	Spacewatch	·	1.8 km	MPC · JPL
547198	2010 ER_{177}	—	September 24, 2008	Catalina	CSS	URS	3.3 km	MPC · JPL
547199	2010 EH_{188}	—	December 29, 2014	Haleakala	Pan-STARRS 1	·	2.4 km	MPC · JPL
547200	2010 EL_{188}	—	March 15, 2010	Kitt Peak	Spacewatch	ERI	1.2 km	MPC · JPL

== 547201–547300 ==
back to top

Designation			Discovery			Properties		Ref
Permanent	Provisional	Named after	Date	Site	Discoverer(s)	Category	Diam.	Ref
547201	2010 EO_{188}	—	February 18, 2010	Kitt Peak	Spacewatch	VER	2.0 km	MPC · JPL
547202	2010 EP_{188}	—	March 12, 2010	Kitt Peak	Spacewatch	·	1.4 km	MPC · JPL
547203	2010 FY_{1}	—	February 12, 2004	Kitt Peak	Spacewatch	HYG	2.7 km	MPC · JPL
547204	2010 FV_{2}	—	May 3, 2005	Kitt Peak	Spacewatch	·	3.0 km	MPC · JPL
547205	2010 FH_{4}	—	October 7, 2007	Mount Lemmon	Mount Lemmon Survey	·	2.8 km	MPC · JPL
547206	2010 FV_{6}	—	March 17, 2010	Dauban	C. Rinner, Kugel, F.	·	1.9 km	MPC · JPL
547207	2010 FM_{10}	—	January 17, 2004	Palomar	NEAT	·	3.3 km	MPC · JPL
547208	2010 FT_{13}	—	December 2, 2005	Mauna Kea	A. Boattini	·	1.4 km	MPC · JPL
547209	2010 FK_{19}	—	October 1, 2008	Kitt Peak	Spacewatch	·	1.0 km	MPC · JPL
547210	2010 FR_{24}	—	March 18, 2010	Kitt Peak	Spacewatch	·	1.5 km	MPC · JPL
547211	2010 FA_{27}	—	March 20, 2010	Kitt Peak	Spacewatch	·	2.1 km	MPC · JPL
547212	2010 FG_{27}	—	March 20, 2010	Mount Lemmon	Mount Lemmon Survey	·	1.1 km	MPC · JPL
547213	2010 FF_{29}	—	March 20, 2010	Mount Lemmon	Mount Lemmon Survey	THB	2.2 km	MPC · JPL
547214	2010 FN_{30}	—	May 20, 2006	Kitt Peak	Spacewatch	·	1.3 km	MPC · JPL
547215	2010 FO_{85}	—	February 13, 2004	Kitt Peak	Spacewatch	·	3.4 km	MPC · JPL
547216	2010 FC_{87}	—	August 26, 2001	Palomar	NEAT	·	4.3 km	MPC · JPL
547217	2010 FF_{91}	—	October 11, 2007	Mount Lemmon	Mount Lemmon Survey	·	1.3 km	MPC · JPL
547218	2010 FR_{94}	—	December 3, 2005	Mauna Kea	A. Boattini	·	1.2 km	MPC · JPL
547219	2010 FE_{95}	—	March 22, 2010	ESA OGS	ESA OGS	·	1.5 km	MPC · JPL
547220	2010 FH_{95}	—	May 16, 2005	Mount Lemmon	Mount Lemmon Survey	VER	2.7 km	MPC · JPL
547221	2010 FQ_{95}	—	March 26, 2010	Kitt Peak	Spacewatch	·	3.0 km	MPC · JPL
547222	2010 FR_{98}	—	March 19, 2010	Mount Lemmon	Mount Lemmon Survey	·	1.0 km	MPC · JPL
547223	2010 FJ_{121}	—	September 21, 2012	Catalina	CSS	·	3.7 km	MPC · JPL
547224	2010 FL_{121}	—	March 17, 2010	Palomar	Palomar Transient Factory	·	1.8 km	MPC · JPL
547225	2010 FV_{137}	—	March 20, 2010	Kitt Peak	Spacewatch	HNS	1.1 km	MPC · JPL
547226	2010 FE_{138}	—	August 13, 2012	Haleakala	Pan-STARRS 1	T_{j} (2.95)	3.2 km	MPC · JPL
547227	2010 FP_{139}	—	March 19, 2010	Mount Lemmon	Mount Lemmon Survey	·	2.3 km	MPC · JPL
547228	2010 FW_{139}	—	March 18, 2010	Mount Lemmon	Mount Lemmon Survey	·	1.5 km	MPC · JPL
547229	2010 FL_{140}	—	February 4, 2016	Haleakala	Pan-STARRS 1	·	3.8 km	MPC · JPL
547230	2010 FT_{140}	—	November 12, 2007	Mount Lemmon	Mount Lemmon Survey	·	3.9 km	MPC · JPL
547231	2010 FA_{141}	—	December 3, 2012	Mount Lemmon	Mount Lemmon Survey	·	1.0 km	MPC · JPL
547232	2010 FR_{141}	—	November 26, 2014	Haleakala	Pan-STARRS 1	HYG	2.2 km	MPC · JPL
547233	2010 FD_{142}	—	March 19, 2010	Mount Lemmon	Mount Lemmon Survey	·	2.1 km	MPC · JPL
547234	2010 GQ_{26}	—	April 5, 2010	Mount Lemmon	Mount Lemmon Survey	·	1.1 km	MPC · JPL
547235	2010 GX_{27}	—	April 8, 2006	Kitt Peak	Spacewatch	MAR	1.1 km	MPC · JPL
547236	2010 GN_{31}	—	April 5, 2010	Kitt Peak	Spacewatch	·	1.1 km	MPC · JPL
547237	2010 GH_{34}	—	March 18, 2010	Mount Lemmon	Mount Lemmon Survey	·	1.1 km	MPC · JPL
547238	2010 GV_{62}	—	October 21, 2001	Socorro	LINEAR	H	550 m	MPC · JPL
547239	2010 GY_{66}	—	April 13, 2002	Kitt Peak	Spacewatch	·	1.9 km	MPC · JPL
547240	2010 GB_{77}	—	April 10, 2010	WISE	WISE	ULA	4.5 km	MPC · JPL
547241	2010 GZ_{79}	—	January 16, 2010	Mount Lemmon	Mount Lemmon Survey	·	2.3 km	MPC · JPL
547242	2010 GR_{89}	—	April 13, 2010	WISE	WISE	·	1.2 km	MPC · JPL
547243	2010 GU_{96}	—	April 14, 2010	Kachina	Hobart, J.	·	4.0 km	MPC · JPL
547244	2010 GS_{98}	—	October 1, 2006	Kitt Peak	Spacewatch	·	3.4 km	MPC · JPL
547245	2010 GZ_{98}	—	April 2, 2006	Kitt Peak	Spacewatch	·	980 m	MPC · JPL
547246	2010 GV_{104}	—	September 11, 2007	Kitt Peak	Spacewatch	·	2.5 km	MPC · JPL
547247	2010 GB_{107}	—	June 12, 1999	Kitt Peak	Spacewatch	·	1.1 km	MPC · JPL
547248	2010 GN_{107}	—	April 8, 2010	Kitt Peak	Spacewatch	(5)	1.2 km	MPC · JPL
547249	2010 GZ_{112}	—	March 18, 2010	Kitt Peak	Spacewatch	·	2.2 km	MPC · JPL
547250	2010 GV_{115}	—	April 10, 2010	Mount Lemmon	Mount Lemmon Survey	THM	2.3 km	MPC · JPL
547251	2010 GP_{120}	—	April 11, 2010	Kitt Peak	Spacewatch	·	2.0 km	MPC · JPL
547252	2010 GU_{120}	—	April 11, 2010	Mount Lemmon	Mount Lemmon Survey	H	470 m	MPC · JPL
547253	2010 GU_{128}	—	April 4, 2010	Catalina	CSS	·	3.1 km	MPC · JPL
547254	2010 GO_{131}	—	December 2, 2008	Kitt Peak	Spacewatch	·	1.1 km	MPC · JPL
547255	2010 GB_{137}	—	September 6, 2008	Kitt Peak	Spacewatch	·	1.2 km	MPC · JPL
547256	2010 GK_{143}	—	April 10, 2010	Mount Lemmon	Mount Lemmon Survey	·	3.4 km	MPC · JPL
547257	2010 GO_{145}	—	March 11, 2002	Palomar	NEAT	·	1.5 km	MPC · JPL
547258	2010 GA_{158}	—	October 29, 2008	Mount Lemmon	Mount Lemmon Survey	·	1.3 km	MPC · JPL
547259	2010 GC_{172}	—	November 9, 2004	Mauna Kea	Veillet, C.	NYS	1.4 km	MPC · JPL
547260	2010 GL_{172}	—	April 8, 2010	Palomar	Palomar Transient Factory	·	1.4 km	MPC · JPL
547261	2010 GM_{173}	—	February 10, 2010	Kitt Peak	Spacewatch	·	3.6 km	MPC · JPL
547262	2010 GJ_{184}	—	November 17, 2014	Mount Lemmon	Mount Lemmon Survey	·	3.1 km	MPC · JPL
547263	2010 GM_{193}	—	October 31, 2008	Mount Lemmon	Mount Lemmon Survey	EOS	1.7 km	MPC · JPL
547264	2010 GC_{199}	—	February 11, 2014	Mount Lemmon	Mount Lemmon Survey	·	1.2 km	MPC · JPL
547265	2010 GG_{199}	—	November 24, 2012	Kitt Peak	Spacewatch	·	1.3 km	MPC · JPL
547266	2010 GV_{200}	—	September 2, 2016	Mount Lemmon	Mount Lemmon Survey	EUN	940 m	MPC · JPL
547267	2010 GR_{202}	—	August 20, 2011	Haleakala	Pan-STARRS 1	HNS	890 m	MPC · JPL
547268	2010 GQ_{204}	—	September 2, 2016	Mount Lemmon	Mount Lemmon Survey	·	1.3 km	MPC · JPL
547269	2010 GF_{206}	—	February 25, 2006	Kitt Peak	Spacewatch	·	970 m	MPC · JPL
547270	2010 HL_{20}	—	May 9, 2006	Mount Lemmon	Mount Lemmon Survey	HNS	1.2 km	MPC · JPL
547271	2010 HU_{23}	—	April 25, 2010	Mount Lemmon	Mount Lemmon Survey	·	1.4 km	MPC · JPL
547272	2010 HD_{78}	—	March 26, 2004	Kitt Peak	Spacewatch	T_{j} (2.92)	3.6 km	MPC · JPL
547273	2010 HB_{79}	—	April 26, 2010	Mount Lemmon	Mount Lemmon Survey	HNS	1.3 km	MPC · JPL
547274	2010 HP_{103}	—	February 15, 2010	Mount Lemmon	Mount Lemmon Survey	·	1.1 km	MPC · JPL
547275	2010 HZ_{114}	—	May 16, 2013	Haleakala	Pan-STARRS 1	EUP	4.0 km	MPC · JPL
547276	2010 HL_{115}	—	September 24, 2008	Mount Lemmon	Mount Lemmon Survey	·	1.7 km	MPC · JPL
547277	2010 HJ_{120}	—	June 4, 2011	Mount Lemmon	Mount Lemmon Survey	·	2.8 km	MPC · JPL
547278	2010 HW_{137}	—	December 4, 2015	Mount Lemmon	Mount Lemmon Survey	·	1.3 km	MPC · JPL
547279	2010 JW_{2}	—	May 3, 2006	Mount Lemmon	Mount Lemmon Survey	·	770 m	MPC · JPL
547280	2010 JE_{3}	—	April 24, 2006	Anderson Mesa	LONEOS	·	1.2 km	MPC · JPL
547281	2010 JM_{32}	—	May 6, 2010	Mount Lemmon	Mount Lemmon Survey	·	1.2 km	MPC · JPL
547282	2010 JE_{35}	—	January 13, 2005	Kitt Peak	Spacewatch	·	1.5 km	MPC · JPL
547283	2010 JD_{38}	—	May 4, 2010	Catalina	CSS	·	1.1 km	MPC · JPL
547284	2010 JR_{38}	—	March 19, 2010	Kitt Peak	Spacewatch	PHO	770 m	MPC · JPL
547285	2010 JG_{39}	—	May 9, 2010	Mount Lemmon	Mount Lemmon Survey	MAR	880 m	MPC · JPL
547286	2010 JD_{49}	—	May 7, 2010	Kitt Peak	Spacewatch	·	1.4 km	MPC · JPL
547287	2010 JG_{49}	—	September 24, 2008	Mount Lemmon	Mount Lemmon Survey	TIR	2.2 km	MPC · JPL
547288	2010 JA_{80}	—	May 12, 2010	Mount Lemmon	Mount Lemmon Survey	·	1.7 km	MPC · JPL
547289	2010 JF_{80}	—	May 12, 2010	Nogales	M. Schwartz, P. R. Holvorcem	·	1.3 km	MPC · JPL
547290	2010 JA_{83}	—	July 12, 2002	Palomar	NEAT	·	2.0 km	MPC · JPL
547291	2010 JO_{85}	—	April 21, 2006	Kitt Peak	Spacewatch	·	1.4 km	MPC · JPL
547292	2010 JL_{87}	—	May 12, 2010	Mount Lemmon	Mount Lemmon Survey	·	1.9 km	MPC · JPL
547293	2010 JM_{87}	—	May 12, 2010	Mount Lemmon	Mount Lemmon Survey	BRG	1.3 km	MPC · JPL
547294	2010 JX_{111}	—	March 12, 2002	Palomar	NEAT	MAS	930 m	MPC · JPL
547295	2010 JC_{114}	—	May 11, 2010	Mount Lemmon	Mount Lemmon Survey	·	990 m	MPC · JPL
547296	2010 JN_{115}	—	May 11, 2010	Mount Lemmon	Mount Lemmon Survey	HNS	1.3 km	MPC · JPL
547297	2010 JO_{120}	—	May 12, 2010	Mount Lemmon	Mount Lemmon Survey	·	1.3 km	MPC · JPL
547298	2010 JV_{122}	—	May 13, 2010	Kitt Peak	Spacewatch	·	1.6 km	MPC · JPL
547299	2010 JJ_{154}	—	April 9, 2010	Kitt Peak	Spacewatch	·	1.1 km	MPC · JPL
547300	2010 JN_{155}	—	March 25, 2006	Kitt Peak	Spacewatch	·	1.0 km	MPC · JPL

== 547301–547400 ==
back to top

Designation			Discovery			Properties		Ref
Permanent	Provisional	Named after	Date	Site	Discoverer(s)	Category	Diam.	Ref
547301	2010 JP_{156}	—	May 11, 2010	Kitt Peak	Spacewatch	·	1.2 km	MPC · JPL
547302	2010 JS_{162}	—	March 23, 2006	Mount Lemmon	Mount Lemmon Survey	MAS	630 m	MPC · JPL
547303	2010 JA_{164}	—	April 9, 2010	Kitt Peak	Spacewatch	·	1.6 km	MPC · JPL
547304	2010 JP_{164}	—	April 9, 2010	Kitt Peak	Spacewatch	NYS	1.0 km	MPC · JPL
547305	2010 JD_{166}	—	May 11, 2010	Kitt Peak	Spacewatch	HNS	1.2 km	MPC · JPL
547306	2010 JZ_{166}	—	November 8, 2007	Mount Lemmon	Mount Lemmon Survey	(5)	1.3 km	MPC · JPL
547307	2010 JN_{167}	—	May 11, 2010	Mount Lemmon	Mount Lemmon Survey	·	1.2 km	MPC · JPL
547308	2010 JA_{175}	—	May 11, 2010	Kitt Peak	Spacewatch	ADE	1.6 km	MPC · JPL
547309	2010 JC_{175}	—	May 12, 2010	Nogales	M. Schwartz, P. R. Holvorcem	·	2.3 km	MPC · JPL
547310	2010 JA_{186}	—	October 12, 2013	Mount Lemmon	Mount Lemmon Survey	·	3.4 km	MPC · JPL
547311	2010 JL_{191}	—	November 30, 2008	Mount Lemmon	Mount Lemmon Survey	VER	2.3 km	MPC · JPL
547312	2010 JS_{202}	—	October 5, 2013	Haleakala	Pan-STARRS 1	VER	2.2 km	MPC · JPL
547313	2010 JL_{204}	—	February 1, 2009	Catalina	CSS	·	1.7 km	MPC · JPL
547314	2010 JQ_{210}	—	October 17, 2012	Mount Lemmon	Mount Lemmon Survey	HNS	1.0 km	MPC · JPL
547315	2010 JW_{211}	—	May 11, 2010	Mount Lemmon	Mount Lemmon Survey	HNS	1.1 km	MPC · JPL
547316	2010 JY_{211}	—	May 5, 2010	Mount Lemmon	Mount Lemmon Survey	BAR	1.4 km	MPC · JPL
547317	2010 JZ_{211}	—	May 11, 2010	Mount Lemmon	Mount Lemmon Survey	·	2.1 km	MPC · JPL
547318	2010 JC_{212}	—	May 7, 2010	Mount Lemmon	Mount Lemmon Survey	·	1.7 km	MPC · JPL
547319	2010 KC_{36}	—	July 29, 2002	Palomar	NEAT	EUN	1.3 km	MPC · JPL
547320	2010 KH_{36}	—	May 17, 2010	Nogales	M. Schwartz, P. R. Holvorcem	ADE	2.2 km	MPC · JPL
547321	2010 KV_{37}	—	May 17, 2010	Kitt Peak	Spacewatch	·	850 m	MPC · JPL
547322	2010 KX_{61}	—	June 1, 2010	Catalina	CSS	·	2.3 km	MPC · JPL
547323	2010 KN_{143}	—	September 16, 2006	Catalina	CSS	·	2.1 km	MPC · JPL
547324	2010 KC_{148}	—	March 2, 2016	Haleakala	Pan-STARRS 1	·	2.9 km	MPC · JPL
547325	2010 KR_{148}	—	January 8, 2016	Haleakala	Pan-STARRS 1	·	2.8 km	MPC · JPL
547326	2010 KW_{149}	—	October 5, 2013	Haleakala	Pan-STARRS 1	·	3.0 km	MPC · JPL
547327	2010 KG_{150}	—	September 15, 2013	Haleakala	Pan-STARRS 1	·	2.8 km	MPC · JPL
547328	2010 KV_{156}	—	November 18, 2016	Kitt Peak	Spacewatch	·	1.0 km	MPC · JPL
547329	2010 KD_{157}	—	December 12, 2012	Kitt Peak	Spacewatch	·	1.8 km	MPC · JPL
547330	2010 KY_{157}	—	May 25, 2010	Mount Lemmon	Mount Lemmon Survey	·	1.9 km	MPC · JPL
547331	2010 KY_{158}	—	May 21, 2010	Kitt Peak	Spacewatch	·	1.8 km	MPC · JPL
547332	2010 LN_{1}	—	June 4, 2010	Nogales	M. Schwartz, P. R. Holvorcem	EUN	1.5 km	MPC · JPL
547333	2010 LZ_{60}	—	June 6, 2010	ESA OGS	ESA OGS	·	2.2 km	MPC · JPL
547334	2010 LH_{62}	—	May 11, 2010	Mount Lemmon	Mount Lemmon Survey	·	1.6 km	MPC · JPL
547335	2010 LL_{63}	—	April 14, 2010	Mount Lemmon	Mount Lemmon Survey	·	1.2 km	MPC · JPL
547336	2010 LT_{64}	—	September 19, 2003	Kitt Peak	Spacewatch	EUN	1.4 km	MPC · JPL
547337	2010 LF_{65}	—	December 30, 2007	Kitt Peak	Spacewatch	·	1.9 km	MPC · JPL
547338	2010 LH_{108}	—	September 20, 2007	Kitt Peak	Spacewatch	·	1.3 km	MPC · JPL
547339	2010 LX_{109}	—	October 20, 2003	Kitt Peak	Spacewatch	·	1.5 km	MPC · JPL
547340	2010 LP_{133}	—	November 2, 2007	Mount Lemmon	Mount Lemmon Survey	·	1.4 km	MPC · JPL
547341	2010 LK_{137}	—	September 3, 2010	Mount Lemmon	Mount Lemmon Survey	·	2.8 km	MPC · JPL
547342	2010 LF_{139}	—	June 3, 2010	WISE	WISE	·	1.5 km	MPC · JPL
547343	2010 LU_{147}	—	September 25, 2016	Haleakala	Pan-STARRS 1	·	1.1 km	MPC · JPL
547344	2010 LP_{149}	—	September 30, 2013	Mount Lemmon	Mount Lemmon Survey	·	2.6 km	MPC · JPL
547345 Kennethchambers	2010 LA_{153}	Kennethchambers	July 26, 2015	Haleakala	Pan-STARRS 2	TIN	1.2 km	MPC · JPL
547346	2010 LS_{154}	—	October 10, 2007	Mount Lemmon	Mount Lemmon Survey	EUP	2.8 km	MPC · JPL
547347	2010 LY_{158}	—	September 24, 2011	Haleakala	Pan-STARRS 1	·	1.7 km	MPC · JPL
547348	2010 MW_{111}	—	February 12, 2000	Apache Point	SDSS Collaboration	·	620 m	MPC · JPL
547349	2010 MZ_{111}	—	June 18, 2010	Mount Lemmon	Mount Lemmon Survey	·	1.4 km	MPC · JPL
547350	2010 MU_{125}	—	October 21, 2006	Lulin	LUSS	·	1.4 km	MPC · JPL
547351	2010 MM_{134}	—	March 4, 2008	Mount Lemmon	Mount Lemmon Survey	·	2.1 km	MPC · JPL
547352	2010 MM_{145}	—	June 5, 2014	Haleakala	Pan-STARRS 1	·	1.4 km	MPC · JPL
547353	2010 MP_{147}	—	March 10, 2015	Haleakala	Pan-STARRS 1	T_{j} (2.99)	3.3 km	MPC · JPL
547354	2010 MQ_{147}	—	November 3, 2011	Mount Lemmon	Mount Lemmon Survey	EUN	1.2 km	MPC · JPL
547355	2010 MB_{148}	—	June 21, 2010	Mount Lemmon	Mount Lemmon Survey	HNS	1.0 km	MPC · JPL
547356	2010 MK_{148}	—	October 26, 2016	Haleakala	Pan-STARRS 1	·	1.9 km	MPC · JPL
547357	2010 MO_{148}	—	May 7, 2014	Haleakala	Pan-STARRS 1	·	1.6 km	MPC · JPL
547358	2010 NM_{35}	—	July 8, 2010	WISE	WISE	HOF	2.4 km	MPC · JPL
547359	2010 NZ_{107}	—	September 3, 2005	Palomar	NEAT	·	2.0 km	MPC · JPL
547360	2010 NK_{113}	—	July 13, 2010	WISE	WISE	DOR	1.8 km	MPC · JPL
547361	2010 NP_{119}	—	December 13, 2006	Mount Lemmon	Mount Lemmon Survey	·	1.5 km	MPC · JPL
547362	2010 NB_{139}	—	December 14, 2006	Kitt Peak	Spacewatch	·	2.0 km	MPC · JPL
547363	2010 NB_{147}	—	November 7, 2015	Mount Lemmon	Mount Lemmon Survey	·	1.3 km	MPC · JPL
547364	2010 ND_{147}	—	June 21, 2014	Haleakala	Pan-STARRS 1	·	1.2 km	MPC · JPL
547365	2010 OW_{1}	—	July 16, 2010	WISE	WISE	·	1.7 km	MPC · JPL
547366	2010 OP_{139}	—	April 1, 2003	Apache Point	SDSS Collaboration	ULA	4.4 km	MPC · JPL
547367	2010 OD_{147}	—	May 6, 2014	Haleakala	Pan-STARRS 1	·	1.6 km	MPC · JPL
547368	2010 OD_{149}	—	December 18, 2007	Mount Lemmon	Mount Lemmon Survey	·	4.6 km	MPC · JPL
547369	2010 OM_{153}	—	July 19, 2010	Siding Spring	SSS	PHO	750 m	MPC · JPL
547370	2010 PE_{10}	—	October 19, 2006	Catalina	CSS	·	2.3 km	MPC · JPL
547371	2010 PN_{26}	—	July 5, 2010	Kitt Peak	Spacewatch	·	1.4 km	MPC · JPL
547372	2010 PX_{76}	—	June 20, 2010	Catalina	CSS	·	1.8 km	MPC · JPL
547373	2010 PL_{79}	—	July 22, 2006	Mount Lemmon	Mount Lemmon Survey	·	1.5 km	MPC · JPL
547374	2010 PM_{80}	—	August 6, 2010	Kitt Peak	Spacewatch	·	1.7 km	MPC · JPL
547375	2010 PC_{88}	—	August 4, 2010	Haleakala	Pan-STARRS 1	centaur	156 km	MPC · JPL
547376	2010 PQ_{89}	—	August 13, 2010	Kitt Peak	Spacewatch	GAL	990 m	MPC · JPL
547377	2010 PU_{90}	—	August 13, 2010	Kitt Peak	Spacewatch	·	1.2 km	MPC · JPL
547378	2010 QB	—	August 19, 2010	Kitt Peak	Spacewatch	·	700 m	MPC · JPL
547379	2010 QE_{3}	—	August 30, 2010	La Sagra	OAM	·	590 m	MPC · JPL
547380	2010 QB_{6}	—	June 14, 2010	Mount Lemmon	Mount Lemmon Survey	·	600 m	MPC · JPL
547381	2010 QX_{6}	—	March 16, 2004	Siding Spring	SSS	·	2.8 km	MPC · JPL
547382	2010 QN_{7}	—	December 4, 1996	Kitt Peak	Spacewatch	·	2.2 km	MPC · JPL
547383	2010 QO_{7}	—	February 7, 2003	Desert Eagle	W. K. Y. Yeung	·	2.7 km	MPC · JPL
547384	2010 RA_{4}	—	December 16, 2007	Mount Lemmon	Mount Lemmon Survey	·	1.5 km	MPC · JPL
547385	2010 RQ_{4}	—	September 2, 2010	Mount Lemmon	Mount Lemmon Survey	EUN	1.1 km	MPC · JPL
547386	2010 RY_{4}	—	September 2, 2010	Mount Lemmon	Mount Lemmon Survey	KOR	1.3 km	MPC · JPL
547387	2010 RS_{5}	—	August 30, 2006	Anderson Mesa	LONEOS	·	1.4 km	MPC · JPL
547388	2010 RZ_{5}	—	December 18, 2007	Mount Lemmon	Mount Lemmon Survey	ADE	1.7 km	MPC · JPL
547389	2010 RL_{6}	—	September 2, 2010	Mount Lemmon	Mount Lemmon Survey	KOR	1.1 km	MPC · JPL
547390	2010 RK_{7}	—	September 30, 2006	Mount Lemmon	Mount Lemmon Survey	·	1.6 km	MPC · JPL
547391	2010 RG_{13}	—	September 1, 2010	Mount Lemmon	Mount Lemmon Survey	AGN	1.1 km	MPC · JPL
547392	2010 RF_{14}	—	August 20, 2000	Kitt Peak	Spacewatch	·	770 m	MPC · JPL
547393	2010 RE_{20}	—	February 22, 2003	Palomar	NEAT	JUN	950 m	MPC · JPL
547394	2010 RQ_{24}	—	October 20, 2006	Mount Lemmon	Mount Lemmon Survey	·	1.7 km	MPC · JPL
547395	2010 RQ_{31}	—	May 26, 2009	Kitt Peak	Spacewatch	·	1.6 km	MPC · JPL
547396	2010 RG_{33}	—	September 1, 2010	Mount Lemmon	Mount Lemmon Survey	·	1.5 km	MPC · JPL
547397	2010 RJ_{33}	—	September 1, 2010	Mount Lemmon	Mount Lemmon Survey	TIN	960 m	MPC · JPL
547398 Turánpál	2010 RX_{40}	Turánpál	September 3, 2010	Piszkéstető	K. Sárneczky, Z. Kuli	·	1.9 km	MPC · JPL
547399	2010 RO_{42}	—	September 4, 2010	Sierra Stars	M. Ory	·	3.1 km	MPC · JPL
547400 Szakcsilakatos	2010 RD_{44}	Szakcsilakatos	September 4, 2010	Piszkéstető	K. Sárneczky, Z. Kuli	·	1.8 km	MPC · JPL

== 547401–547500 ==
back to top

Designation			Discovery			Properties		Ref
Permanent	Provisional	Named after	Date	Site	Discoverer(s)	Category	Diam.	Ref
547401	2010 RD_{45}	—	October 21, 2006	Lulin	LUSS	·	2.1 km	MPC · JPL
547402	2010 RJ_{46}	—	September 2, 2010	Mount Lemmon	Mount Lemmon Survey	·	1.7 km	MPC · JPL
547403	2010 RN_{49}	—	September 4, 2010	Kitt Peak	Spacewatch	·	1.4 km	MPC · JPL
547404	2010 RF_{52}	—	August 26, 2005	Palomar	NEAT	·	1.8 km	MPC · JPL
547405	2010 RG_{52}	—	September 4, 2010	Kitt Peak	Spacewatch	·	1.6 km	MPC · JPL
547406	2010 RO_{52}	—	December 29, 2003	Kitt Peak	Spacewatch	·	1.8 km	MPC · JPL
547407	2010 RC_{53}	—	September 6, 2010	SM Montmagastrell	Bosch, J. M.	·	700 m	MPC · JPL
547408	2010 RA_{54}	—	December 31, 2007	Kitt Peak	Spacewatch	·	1.6 km	MPC · JPL
547409	2010 RS_{54}	—	September 4, 2010	Kitt Peak	Spacewatch	·	1.7 km	MPC · JPL
547410	2010 RH_{55}	—	November 11, 2006	Mount Lemmon	Mount Lemmon Survey	·	1.5 km	MPC · JPL
547411	2010 RU_{56}	—	September 5, 2010	Mount Lemmon	Mount Lemmon Survey	·	1.8 km	MPC · JPL
547412	2010 RR_{58}	—	March 1, 2008	Kitt Peak	Spacewatch	·	1.9 km	MPC · JPL
547413	2010 RT_{64}	—	October 31, 2006	Mount Lemmon	Mount Lemmon Survey	·	1.3 km	MPC · JPL
547414	2010 RL_{66}	—	September 4, 2010	Mount Lemmon	Mount Lemmon Survey	·	2.3 km	MPC · JPL
547415	2010 RK_{74}	—	January 8, 2002	Apache Point	SDSS Collaboration	GEF	1.4 km	MPC · JPL
547416	2010 RJ_{75}	—	September 8, 2010	Dauban	C. Rinner, Kugel, F.	·	1.8 km	MPC · JPL
547417	2010 RD_{76}	—	October 12, 2007	Mount Lemmon	Mount Lemmon Survey	·	890 m	MPC · JPL
547418	2010 RJ_{76}	—	July 12, 2005	Mount Lemmon	Mount Lemmon Survey	GEF	1.4 km	MPC · JPL
547419	2010 RL_{87}	—	August 9, 2005	Cerro Tololo	Deep Ecliptic Survey	·	1.8 km	MPC · JPL
547420	2010 RD_{88}	—	September 3, 2010	Mount Lemmon	Mount Lemmon Survey	AEO	860 m	MPC · JPL
547421	2010 RQ_{90}	—	September 6, 2010	La Sagra	OAM	·	580 m	MPC · JPL
547422	2010 RS_{90}	—	May 4, 2005	Palomar	NEAT	·	1.5 km	MPC · JPL
547423	2010 RL_{91}	—	September 10, 2010	Kitt Peak	Spacewatch	·	1.7 km	MPC · JPL
547424	2010 RT_{92}	—	September 16, 2006	Catalina	CSS	·	1.4 km	MPC · JPL
547425	2010 RO_{93}	—	September 11, 2010	Mount Lemmon	Mount Lemmon Survey	·	1.3 km	MPC · JPL
547426	2010 RX_{93}	—	October 2, 2006	Mount Lemmon	Mount Lemmon Survey	·	1.6 km	MPC · JPL
547427	2010 RF_{95}	—	October 20, 2006	Kitt Peak	Spacewatch	·	1.6 km	MPC · JPL
547428	2010 RG_{95}	—	September 12, 2010	Mount Lemmon	Mount Lemmon Survey	·	1.8 km	MPC · JPL
547429	2010 RK_{99}	—	February 9, 2008	Kitt Peak	Spacewatch	·	1.7 km	MPC · JPL
547430	2010 RP_{99}	—	September 10, 2010	Kitt Peak	Spacewatch	WIT	860 m	MPC · JPL
547431	2010 RV_{99}	—	September 10, 2010	Kitt Peak	Spacewatch	·	1.4 km	MPC · JPL
547432	2010 RC_{100}	—	September 10, 2010	Kitt Peak	Spacewatch	·	1.3 km	MPC · JPL
547433	2010 RH_{100}	—	September 10, 2010	Kitt Peak	Spacewatch	·	1.5 km	MPC · JPL
547434	2010 RM_{105}	—	September 10, 2010	Kitt Peak	Spacewatch	·	1.7 km	MPC · JPL
547435	2010 RO_{105}	—	August 30, 2005	Kitt Peak	Spacewatch	·	1.4 km	MPC · JPL
547436	2010 RU_{105}	—	September 10, 2010	Kitt Peak	Spacewatch	AGN	840 m	MPC · JPL
547437	2010 RH_{108}	—	September 10, 2010	Mount Lemmon	Mount Lemmon Survey	·	1.8 km	MPC · JPL
547438	2010 RU_{110}	—	September 11, 2010	Kitt Peak	Spacewatch	BRA	1.4 km	MPC · JPL
547439	2010 RK_{114}	—	September 11, 2010	Kitt Peak	Spacewatch	·	1.4 km	MPC · JPL
547440	2010 RD_{116}	—	September 11, 2010	Kitt Peak	Spacewatch	·	1.7 km	MPC · JPL
547441	2010 RF_{121}	—	September 12, 2010	Mount Lemmon	Mount Lemmon Survey	·	1.6 km	MPC · JPL
547442	2010 RH_{121}	—	September 12, 2010	Mount Lemmon	Mount Lemmon Survey	·	1.6 km	MPC · JPL
547443	2010 RN_{124}	—	November 2, 2007	Mount Lemmon	Mount Lemmon Survey	·	640 m	MPC · JPL
547444	2010 RW_{137}	—	September 10, 2010	Mount Lemmon	Mount Lemmon Survey	·	1.8 km	MPC · JPL
547445	2010 RR_{140}	—	October 26, 2006	Lulin	LUSS	·	1.7 km	MPC · JPL
547446	2010 RG_{142}	—	September 14, 2010	Kitt Peak	Spacewatch	EUN	1.5 km	MPC · JPL
547447	2010 RS_{147}	—	September 14, 2010	Kitt Peak	Spacewatch	·	630 m	MPC · JPL
547448	2010 RN_{150}	—	September 6, 2010	La Sagra	OAM	·	580 m	MPC · JPL
547449	2010 RQ_{152}	—	September 15, 2010	Kitt Peak	Spacewatch	·	1.5 km	MPC · JPL
547450	2010 RQ_{154}	—	September 15, 2010	Kitt Peak	Spacewatch	·	1.3 km	MPC · JPL
547451	2010 RC_{155}	—	September 15, 2010	Kitt Peak	Spacewatch	3:2	5.6 km	MPC · JPL
547452	2010 RQ_{155}	—	September 15, 2010	Kitt Peak	Spacewatch	·	1.7 km	MPC · JPL
547453	2010 RE_{156}	—	March 1, 2008	Kitt Peak	Spacewatch	HNS	1.2 km	MPC · JPL
547454	2010 RH_{156}	—	September 15, 2010	Kitt Peak	Spacewatch	·	1.8 km	MPC · JPL
547455	2010 RR_{157}	—	August 25, 2001	Kitt Peak	Spacewatch	·	2.5 km	MPC · JPL
547456	2010 RB_{161}	—	September 3, 2010	Mount Lemmon	Mount Lemmon Survey	EUN	1.2 km	MPC · JPL
547457	2010 RH_{161}	—	August 10, 2010	Kitt Peak	Spacewatch	·	1.9 km	MPC · JPL
547458	2010 RF_{162}	—	June 20, 2010	Mount Lemmon	Mount Lemmon Survey	·	1.5 km	MPC · JPL
547459	2010 RN_{162}	—	September 4, 2010	Mount Lemmon	Mount Lemmon Survey	·	1.4 km	MPC · JPL
547460	2010 RJ_{165}	—	September 9, 2010	Bisei	BATTeRS	·	2.7 km	MPC · JPL
547461	2010 RJ_{168}	—	September 2, 2010	Mount Lemmon	Mount Lemmon Survey	·	1.3 km	MPC · JPL
547462	2010 RO_{168}	—	October 2, 2006	Mount Lemmon	Mount Lemmon Survey	·	1.3 km	MPC · JPL
547463	2010 RH_{173}	—	September 5, 2010	Mount Lemmon	Mount Lemmon Survey	·	2.0 km	MPC · JPL
547464	2010 RB_{177}	—	September 11, 2010	Kitt Peak	Spacewatch	·	1.4 km	MPC · JPL
547465	2010 RB_{179}	—	September 28, 2001	Palomar	NEAT	·	1.6 km	MPC · JPL
547466	2010 RW_{179}	—	September 1, 2005	Palomar	NEAT	·	2.0 km	MPC · JPL
547467	2010 RL_{180}	—	October 5, 2005	Catalina	CSS	·	2.1 km	MPC · JPL
547468	2010 RB_{181}	—	September 11, 2010	Kitt Peak	Spacewatch	·	1.4 km	MPC · JPL
547469	2010 RK_{181}	—	September 10, 2010	Kitt Peak	Spacewatch	·	1.7 km	MPC · JPL
547470	2010 RY_{181}	—	November 7, 2007	Kitt Peak	Spacewatch	·	570 m	MPC · JPL
547471	2010 RG_{182}	—	October 2, 2010	Nogales	M. Schwartz, P. R. Holvorcem	·	1.8 km	MPC · JPL
547472	2010 RK_{183}	—	July 23, 2003	Palomar	NEAT	·	720 m	MPC · JPL
547473	2010 RM_{183}	—	October 19, 2010	Mount Lemmon	Mount Lemmon Survey	·	2.5 km	MPC · JPL
547474	2010 RS_{183}	—	December 13, 2006	Catalina	CSS	·	3.0 km	MPC · JPL
547475	2010 RT_{183}	—	September 16, 2010	Kitt Peak	Spacewatch	AGN	1.1 km	MPC · JPL
547476	2010 RY_{183}	—	September 16, 2010	Kitt Peak	Spacewatch	AGN	1.1 km	MPC · JPL
547477	2010 RO_{185}	—	March 8, 2003	Kitt Peak	Spacewatch	KOR	1.3 km	MPC · JPL
547478	2010 RS_{188}	—	September 15, 2010	Kitt Peak	Spacewatch	·	1.8 km	MPC · JPL
547479	2010 RQ_{191}	—	January 25, 2009	Kitt Peak	Spacewatch	·	1.1 km	MPC · JPL
547480	2010 RR_{191}	—	September 15, 2010	Mount Lemmon	Mount Lemmon Survey	·	780 m	MPC · JPL
547481	2010 RK_{192}	—	September 3, 2014	Mount Lemmon	Mount Lemmon Survey	·	1.1 km	MPC · JPL
547482	2010 RV_{192}	—	November 14, 2015	Mount Lemmon	Mount Lemmon Survey	·	1.8 km	MPC · JPL
547483	2010 RX_{192}	—	September 3, 2010	Mount Lemmon	Mount Lemmon Survey	·	1.6 km	MPC · JPL
547484	2010 RX_{193}	—	September 5, 2010	Mount Lemmon	Mount Lemmon Survey	BRA	1.7 km	MPC · JPL
547485	2010 RJ_{194}	—	September 15, 2010	Kitt Peak	Spacewatch	·	1.4 km	MPC · JPL
547486	2010 RY_{194}	—	September 3, 2010	Mount Lemmon	Mount Lemmon Survey	·	1.8 km	MPC · JPL
547487	2010 RE_{198}	—	October 13, 2006	Kitt Peak	Spacewatch	·	1.3 km	MPC · JPL
547488	2010 RN_{198}	—	September 14, 2010	Mount Lemmon	Mount Lemmon Survey	PAD	1.2 km	MPC · JPL
547489	2010 RQ_{198}	—	August 13, 2010	Kitt Peak	Spacewatch	·	1.8 km	MPC · JPL
547490	2010 RC_{199}	—	June 21, 2014	Mount Lemmon	Mount Lemmon Survey	MAR	1.2 km	MPC · JPL
547491	2010 RH_{199}	—	February 14, 2013	Haleakala	Pan-STARRS 1	EUN	930 m	MPC · JPL
547492	2010 RT_{199}	—	September 15, 2010	Mount Lemmon	Mount Lemmon Survey	·	1.4 km	MPC · JPL
547493	2010 RS_{201}	—	September 2, 2010	Mount Lemmon	Mount Lemmon Survey	·	1.2 km	MPC · JPL
547494	2010 RX_{206}	—	September 6, 2010	Mount Lemmon	Mount Lemmon Survey	JUN	1.0 km	MPC · JPL
547495	2010 RK_{207}	—	September 4, 2010	Kitt Peak	Spacewatch	·	1.4 km	MPC · JPL
547496	2010 RU_{208}	—	September 15, 2010	Mount Lemmon	Mount Lemmon Survey	·	2.2 km	MPC · JPL
547497	2010 RV_{208}	—	September 3, 2010	Mount Lemmon	Mount Lemmon Survey	·	2.3 km	MPC · JPL
547498	2010 RR_{209}	—	September 9, 2010	Kitt Peak	Spacewatch	·	1.3 km	MPC · JPL
547499	2010 SG	—	August 6, 2005	Palomar	NEAT	·	2.0 km	MPC · JPL
547500	2010 SZ_{2}	—	February 10, 2008	Kitt Peak	Spacewatch	MRX	860 m	MPC · JPL

== 547501–547600 ==
back to top

Designation			Discovery			Properties		Ref
Permanent	Provisional	Named after	Date	Site	Discoverer(s)	Category	Diam.	Ref
547501	2010 SQ_{3}	—	September 17, 2010	Catalina	CSS	·	590 m	MPC · JPL
547502	2010 SA_{5}	—	December 3, 2007	Lulin	LUSS	·	650 m	MPC · JPL
547503	2010 SW_{5}	—	July 31, 2005	Palomar	NEAT	·	1.9 km	MPC · JPL
547504	2010 SV_{7}	—	August 24, 2001	Kitt Peak	Spacewatch	·	1.6 km	MPC · JPL
547505	2010 SS_{8}	—	September 17, 2010	Kitt Peak	Spacewatch	·	510 m	MPC · JPL
547506	2010 SF_{10}	—	September 17, 2010	Mount Lemmon	Mount Lemmon Survey	GEF	1.1 km	MPC · JPL
547507	2010 SF_{12}	—	September 5, 2010	Mount Lemmon	Mount Lemmon Survey	·	1.6 km	MPC · JPL
547508 Perehorts	2010 SF_{13}	Perehorts	September 26, 2010	SM Montmagastrell	Bosch, J. M.	615	1.2 km	MPC · JPL
547509	2010 SE_{23}	—	March 8, 2008	Mount Lemmon	Mount Lemmon Survey	·	2.0 km	MPC · JPL
547510	2010 SD_{31}	—	September 10, 2010	Catalina	CSS	BRA	1.4 km	MPC · JPL
547511	2010 SG_{35}	—	September 30, 2010	Mount Lemmon	Mount Lemmon Survey	·	460 m	MPC · JPL
547512	2010 SE_{36}	—	September 30, 2010	Piszkés-tető	K. Sárneczky, Z. Kuli	·	1.5 km	MPC · JPL
547513	2010 SH_{38}	—	August 25, 2001	Anderson Mesa	LONEOS	·	2.1 km	MPC · JPL
547514	2010 SU_{38}	—	September 9, 2010	Kitt Peak	Spacewatch	·	1.7 km	MPC · JPL
547515	2010 SF_{44}	—	September 16, 2010	Mount Lemmon	Mount Lemmon Survey	·	1.7 km	MPC · JPL
547516	2010 SD_{45}	—	January 12, 2008	Kitt Peak	Spacewatch	·	1.9 km	MPC · JPL
547517	2010 SF_{45}	—	September 18, 2010	Mount Lemmon	Mount Lemmon Survey	·	1.7 km	MPC · JPL
547518	2010 SB_{50}	—	September 16, 2010	Mount Lemmon	Mount Lemmon Survey	·	1.4 km	MPC · JPL
547519	2010 SO_{50}	—	September 30, 2010	Mount Lemmon	Mount Lemmon Survey	PAD	1.2 km	MPC · JPL
547520	2010 SJ_{52}	—	September 29, 2010	Mount Lemmon	Mount Lemmon Survey	·	1.5 km	MPC · JPL
547521	2010 SW_{52}	—	August 10, 2010	Kitt Peak	Spacewatch	·	610 m	MPC · JPL
547522	2010 TU_{4}	—	September 15, 2010	Kitt Peak	Spacewatch	·	1.7 km	MPC · JPL
547523	2010 TY_{5}	—	December 16, 2007	Mount Lemmon	Mount Lemmon Survey	·	820 m	MPC · JPL
547524	2010 TN_{6}	—	July 12, 2005	Mount Lemmon	Mount Lemmon Survey	·	2.0 km	MPC · JPL
547525	2010 TP_{11}	—	October 1, 2010	La Sagra	OAM	·	610 m	MPC · JPL
547526	2010 TA_{12}	—	September 11, 2010	Bisei	BATTeRS	·	2.1 km	MPC · JPL
547527	2010 TT_{13}	—	September 10, 2010	Kitt Peak	Spacewatch	·	480 m	MPC · JPL
547528	2010 TC_{15}	—	October 3, 2010	Kitt Peak	Spacewatch	·	1.2 km	MPC · JPL
547529	2010 TM_{15}	—	September 5, 2010	Bergisch Gladbach	W. Bickel	·	2.0 km	MPC · JPL
547530	2010 TJ_{16}	—	September 16, 2010	Kitt Peak	Spacewatch	·	630 m	MPC · JPL
547531	2010 TK_{20}	—	July 8, 2010	Kitt Peak	Spacewatch	·	2.2 km	MPC · JPL
547532	2010 TD_{26}	—	November 21, 2007	Mount Lemmon	Mount Lemmon Survey	·	2.1 km	MPC · JPL
547533	2010 TB_{27}	—	September 2, 2010	Mount Lemmon	Mount Lemmon Survey	·	1.5 km	MPC · JPL
547534	2010 TF_{27}	—	October 2, 2010	Kitt Peak	Spacewatch	·	1.4 km	MPC · JPL
547535	2010 TX_{30}	—	September 5, 1996	Kitt Peak	Spacewatch	AGN	900 m	MPC · JPL
547536	2010 TG_{31}	—	September 4, 2010	Kitt Peak	Spacewatch	·	1.2 km	MPC · JPL
547537	2010 TX_{34}	—	September 17, 2010	Kitt Peak	Spacewatch	HOF	2.0 km	MPC · JPL
547538	2010 TW_{35}	—	October 9, 2005	Kitt Peak	Spacewatch	KOR	1.2 km	MPC · JPL
547539	2010 TX_{36}	—	October 19, 2006	Catalina	CSS	EUN	1.3 km	MPC · JPL
547540	2010 TH_{37}	—	August 12, 2010	La Sagra	OAM	EUN	1.4 km	MPC · JPL
547541	2010 TJ_{39}	—	October 20, 2001	Palomar	NEAT	·	2.8 km	MPC · JPL
547542	2010 TV_{39}	—	September 19, 2010	Kitt Peak	Spacewatch	·	1.3 km	MPC · JPL
547543	2010 TS_{40}	—	September 10, 2010	Kitt Peak	Spacewatch	·	1.3 km	MPC · JPL
547544	2010 TV_{43}	—	September 14, 2010	Kitt Peak	Spacewatch	·	1.4 km	MPC · JPL
547545	2010 TZ_{43}	—	October 2, 2010	Kitt Peak	Spacewatch	·	1.4 km	MPC · JPL
547546	2010 TB_{45}	—	October 3, 2010	Kitt Peak	Spacewatch	·	1.6 km	MPC · JPL
547547	2010 TM_{46}	—	October 3, 2010	Kitt Peak	Spacewatch	BRA	1.2 km	MPC · JPL
547548	2010 TZ_{50}	—	October 3, 2010	Kitt Peak	Spacewatch	·	1.3 km	MPC · JPL
547549	2010 TT_{52}	—	September 10, 2010	Mount Lemmon	Mount Lemmon Survey	MRX	990 m	MPC · JPL
547550	2010 TH_{53}	—	September 17, 2010	Mount Lemmon	Mount Lemmon Survey	·	1.4 km	MPC · JPL
547551	2010 TG_{55}	—	February 13, 2008	Mount Lemmon	Mount Lemmon Survey	·	1.8 km	MPC · JPL
547552	2010 TP_{56}	—	October 3, 2010	Kitt Peak	Spacewatch	·	1.5 km	MPC · JPL
547553	2010 TT_{56}	—	November 16, 2006	Kitt Peak	Spacewatch	·	1.5 km	MPC · JPL
547554	2010 TD_{60}	—	October 9, 2007	Kitt Peak	Spacewatch	·	490 m	MPC · JPL
547555	2010 TG_{63}	—	August 6, 2005	Palomar	NEAT	·	1.7 km	MPC · JPL
547556	2010 TU_{67}	—	September 18, 2010	Kitt Peak	Spacewatch	ADE	1.9 km	MPC · JPL
547557	2010 TF_{70}	—	March 1, 2008	Mount Lemmon	Mount Lemmon Survey	·	1.7 km	MPC · JPL
547558	2010 TT_{72}	—	September 30, 2010	Catalina	CSS	·	2.2 km	MPC · JPL
547559	2010 TY_{72}	—	September 26, 2005	Catalina	CSS	·	1.7 km	MPC · JPL
547560	2010 TX_{82}	—	October 21, 2006	Kitt Peak	Spacewatch	WIT	850 m	MPC · JPL
547561	2010 TQ_{84}	—	September 19, 2010	Kitt Peak	Spacewatch	·	1.3 km	MPC · JPL
547562	2010 TL_{85}	—	October 23, 2006	Kitt Peak	Spacewatch	·	1.5 km	MPC · JPL
547563	2010 TN_{85}	—	March 30, 2008	Kitt Peak	Spacewatch	·	1.5 km	MPC · JPL
547564	2010 TO_{85}	—	December 1, 2005	Kitt Peak	Wasserman, L. H., Millis, R. L.	KOR	1.2 km	MPC · JPL
547565	2010 TT_{86}	—	September 13, 2005	Kitt Peak	Spacewatch	·	1.7 km	MPC · JPL
547566	2010 TF_{92}	—	September 28, 2001	Palomar	NEAT	·	1.6 km	MPC · JPL
547567	2010 TR_{93}	—	August 9, 2005	Cerro Tololo	Deep Ecliptic Survey	·	1.6 km	MPC · JPL
547568	2010 TJ_{95}	—	October 21, 2001	Kitt Peak	Spacewatch	·	1.2 km	MPC · JPL
547569	2010 TG_{105}	—	October 9, 2010	Kitt Peak	Spacewatch	AGN	910 m	MPC · JPL
547570	2010 TF_{106}	—	September 29, 2010	Kitt Peak	Spacewatch	HOF	1.9 km	MPC · JPL
547571	2010 TC_{112}	—	October 9, 2010	Mount Lemmon	Mount Lemmon Survey	·	1.4 km	MPC · JPL
547572	2010 TV_{117}	—	December 12, 2006	Kitt Peak	Spacewatch	·	1.4 km	MPC · JPL
547573	2010 TY_{120}	—	September 15, 2010	Mount Lemmon	Mount Lemmon Survey	PAD	1.0 km	MPC · JPL
547574	2010 TZ_{121}	—	November 14, 2006	Mount Lemmon	Mount Lemmon Survey	EUN	1.3 km	MPC · JPL
547575	2010 TD_{123}	—	October 10, 2010	Mount Lemmon	Mount Lemmon Survey	·	1.4 km	MPC · JPL
547576	2010 TB_{125}	—	October 10, 2001	Palomar	NEAT	·	1.6 km	MPC · JPL
547577	2010 TU_{128}	—	February 13, 2008	Mount Lemmon	Mount Lemmon Survey	WIT	980 m	MPC · JPL
547578	2010 TG_{129}	—	October 11, 2010	Catalina	CSS	·	1.7 km	MPC · JPL
547579	2010 TJ_{130}	—	September 18, 2010	Kitt Peak	Spacewatch	·	590 m	MPC · JPL
547580	2010 TX_{131}	—	September 14, 2010	Kitt Peak	Spacewatch	·	1.4 km	MPC · JPL
547581	2010 TF_{133}	—	October 11, 2010	Mount Lemmon	Mount Lemmon Survey	·	1.9 km	MPC · JPL
547582	2010 TT_{135}	—	October 11, 2010	Mount Lemmon	Mount Lemmon Survey	·	1.7 km	MPC · JPL
547583	2010 TS_{139}	—	October 11, 2010	Mount Lemmon	Mount Lemmon Survey	·	1.9 km	MPC · JPL
547584	2010 TW_{139}	—	October 11, 2010	Mount Lemmon	Mount Lemmon Survey	H	300 m	MPC · JPL
547585	2010 TY_{141}	—	January 24, 2007	Mount Lemmon	Mount Lemmon Survey	·	1.9 km	MPC · JPL
547586	2010 TJ_{142}	—	August 29, 2005	Kitt Peak	Spacewatch	·	1.5 km	MPC · JPL
547587	2010 TQ_{142}	—	October 11, 2010	Mount Lemmon	Mount Lemmon Survey	·	1.5 km	MPC · JPL
547588	2010 TW_{142}	—	October 11, 2010	Mount Lemmon	Mount Lemmon Survey	·	1.8 km	MPC · JPL
547589	2010 TK_{146}	—	March 27, 2008	Mount Lemmon	Mount Lemmon Survey	·	1.7 km	MPC · JPL
547590	2010 TY_{150}	—	October 18, 2001	Palomar	NEAT	·	1.4 km	MPC · JPL
547591	2010 TH_{151}	—	July 30, 2005	Palomar	NEAT	·	1.8 km	MPC · JPL
547592	2010 TZ_{156}	—	September 19, 2010	Kitt Peak	Spacewatch	·	1.3 km	MPC · JPL
547593	2010 TT_{158}	—	September 17, 2010	Kitt Peak	Spacewatch	·	1.2 km	MPC · JPL
547594	2010 TU_{158}	—	November 22, 2006	Kitt Peak	Spacewatch	·	1.8 km	MPC · JPL
547595	2010 TB_{160}	—	October 10, 2010	Mount Lemmon	Mount Lemmon Survey	AGN	1.0 km	MPC · JPL
547596	2010 TB_{161}	—	September 19, 2010	Kitt Peak	Spacewatch	EUN	990 m	MPC · JPL
547597	2010 TN_{161}	—	November 11, 2001	Apache Point	SDSS Collaboration	·	1.6 km	MPC · JPL
547598	2010 TW_{161}	—	September 17, 2010	Flagstaff	Wasserman, L. H.	·	860 m	MPC · JPL
547599 Virághalmy	2010 TM_{163}	Virághalmy	October 12, 2010	Piszkéstető	K. Sárneczky, J. Kelemen	GEF	910 m	MPC · JPL
547600	2010 TY_{163}	—	September 18, 2010	Mount Lemmon	Mount Lemmon Survey	·	530 m	MPC · JPL

== 547601–547700 ==
back to top

Designation			Discovery			Properties		Ref
Permanent	Provisional	Named after	Date	Site	Discoverer(s)	Category	Diam.	Ref
547601	2010 TR_{165}	—	September 18, 2010	Mount Lemmon	Mount Lemmon Survey	·	1.5 km	MPC · JPL
547602	2010 TT_{165}	—	September 18, 2010	Mount Lemmon	Mount Lemmon Survey	·	1.7 km	MPC · JPL
547603	2010 TR_{167}	—	November 5, 2007	Kitt Peak	Spacewatch	·	520 m	MPC · JPL
547604	2010 TS_{167}	—	April 12, 2005	Kitt Peak	Deep Ecliptic Survey	·	570 m	MPC · JPL
547605	2010 TS_{169}	—	October 11, 2010	Mount Lemmon	Mount Lemmon Survey	·	1.5 km	MPC · JPL
547606	2010 TZ_{171}	—	October 14, 2010	Bergisch Gladbach	W. Bickel	·	1.3 km	MPC · JPL
547607	2010 TY_{172}	—	October 14, 2010	Mount Lemmon	Mount Lemmon Survey	AGN	780 m	MPC · JPL
547608	2010 TJ_{173}	—	October 15, 2010	Mayhill-ISON	L. Elenin	·	790 m	MPC · JPL
547609	2010 TW_{175}	—	October 31, 2005	Mount Lemmon	Mount Lemmon Survey	·	2.0 km	MPC · JPL
547610	2010 TE_{186}	—	October 20, 2001	Palomar	NEAT	·	2.1 km	MPC · JPL
547611	2010 TV_{190}	—	November 11, 2006	Kitt Peak	Spacewatch	·	2.4 km	MPC · JPL
547612 Károligáspár	2010 TA_{193}	Károligáspár	October 11, 2010	Piszkéstető	K. Sárneczky, G. Mező	·	1.9 km	MPC · JPL
547613	2010 TC_{193}	—	October 13, 2010	Mount Lemmon	Mount Lemmon Survey	GEF	820 m	MPC · JPL
547614	2010 TZ_{193}	—	October 2, 2010	Kitt Peak	Spacewatch	·	1.4 km	MPC · JPL
547615	2010 TO_{194}	—	October 12, 2010	Mount Lemmon	Mount Lemmon Survey	·	2.0 km	MPC · JPL
547616	2010 TR_{195}	—	October 6, 2010	Haleakala	Pan-STARRS 1	plutino	140 km	MPC · JPL
547617	2010 TT_{195}	—	October 9, 2010	Haleakala	Pan-STARRS 1	cubewano (hot)	308 km	MPC · JPL
547618	2010 TW_{195}	—	October 12, 2010	Kitt Peak	Spacewatch	·	620 m	MPC · JPL
547619	2010 TZ_{195}	—	October 12, 2010	Mount Lemmon	Mount Lemmon Survey	·	670 m	MPC · JPL
547620	2010 TB_{196}	—	October 12, 2010	Mount Lemmon	Mount Lemmon Survey	·	600 m	MPC · JPL
547621	2010 TD_{197}	—	July 7, 2014	Haleakala	Pan-STARRS 1	·	1.7 km	MPC · JPL
547622	2010 TK_{197}	—	October 10, 2010	Kitt Peak	Spacewatch	·	1.5 km	MPC · JPL
547623	2010 TW_{197}	—	January 19, 2012	Kitt Peak	Spacewatch	·	1.7 km	MPC · JPL
547624	2010 TX_{197}	—	October 3, 2010	Catalina	CSS	·	560 m	MPC · JPL
547625	2010 TN_{198}	—	October 1, 2010	Mount Lemmon	Mount Lemmon Survey	·	1.5 km	MPC · JPL
547626	2010 TY_{198}	—	January 18, 2012	Kitt Peak	Spacewatch	·	1.5 km	MPC · JPL
547627	2010 TK_{199}	—	November 10, 2015	Mount Lemmon	Mount Lemmon Survey	·	2.3 km	MPC · JPL
547628	2010 TS_{199}	—	October 9, 2010	Mount Lemmon	Mount Lemmon Survey	DOR	1.8 km	MPC · JPL
547629	2010 TU_{199}	—	January 30, 2012	Kitt Peak	Spacewatch	AEO	910 m	MPC · JPL
547630	2010 TF_{200}	—	October 14, 2010	Mount Lemmon	Mount Lemmon Survey	·	530 m	MPC · JPL
547631	2010 TE_{207}	—	January 14, 2012	Mount Lemmon	Mount Lemmon Survey	·	1.5 km	MPC · JPL
547632	2010 TS_{209}	—	October 13, 2010	Mount Lemmon	Mount Lemmon Survey	·	1.5 km	MPC · JPL
547633	2010 TG_{212}	—	October 1, 2010	Mount Lemmon	Mount Lemmon Survey	·	1.7 km	MPC · JPL
547634	2010 TL_{212}	—	October 12, 2010	Mount Lemmon	Mount Lemmon Survey	·	1.2 km	MPC · JPL
547635	2010 TV_{213}	—	October 11, 2010	Mount Lemmon	Mount Lemmon Survey	·	1.4 km	MPC · JPL
547636	2010 TK_{214}	—	October 14, 2010	Kitt Peak	Spacewatch	·	450 m	MPC · JPL
547637	2010 TY_{214}	—	October 13, 2010	Mount Lemmon	Mount Lemmon Survey	·	2.3 km	MPC · JPL
547638	2010 TJ_{215}	—	October 2, 2010	Mount Lemmon	Mount Lemmon Survey	·	1.6 km	MPC · JPL
547639	2010 TN_{215}	—	October 3, 2010	Kitt Peak	Spacewatch	·	2.5 km	MPC · JPL
547640	2010 TO_{215}	—	July 19, 2015	Haleakala	Pan-STARRS 1	EOS	1.2 km	MPC · JPL
547641	2010 TG_{217}	—	October 12, 2010	Mount Lemmon	Mount Lemmon Survey	·	680 m	MPC · JPL
547642	2010 TJ_{217}	—	October 13, 2010	Mount Lemmon	Mount Lemmon Survey	·	2.0 km	MPC · JPL
547643	2010 TL_{217}	—	October 14, 2010	Mount Lemmon	Mount Lemmon Survey	·	2.1 km	MPC · JPL
547644	2010 UW_{1}	—	October 17, 2010	Mount Lemmon	Mount Lemmon Survey	PAD	1.3 km	MPC · JPL
547645	2010 UR_{4}	—	September 16, 2010	Mount Lemmon	Mount Lemmon Survey	·	1.2 km	MPC · JPL
547646	2010 UN_{12}	—	October 28, 2010	Catalina	CSS	GEF	1.2 km	MPC · JPL
547647	2010 UB_{13}	—	January 17, 2005	Kitt Peak	Spacewatch	·	640 m	MPC · JPL
547648	2010 UM_{13}	—	March 11, 1996	Kitt Peak	Spacewatch	·	910 m	MPC · JPL
547649	2010 UQ_{16}	—	March 30, 2003	Kitt Peak	Deep Ecliptic Survey	AGN	1.2 km	MPC · JPL
547650	2010 UN_{17}	—	October 12, 2005	Kitt Peak	Spacewatch	KOR	1.2 km	MPC · JPL
547651	2010 UR_{17}	—	February 6, 2007	Mount Lemmon	Mount Lemmon Survey	·	1.3 km	MPC · JPL
547652	2010 UD_{18}	—	March 8, 2003	Palomar	NEAT	·	2.2 km	MPC · JPL
547653	2010 UP_{18}	—	March 12, 2008	Kitt Peak	Spacewatch	·	1.7 km	MPC · JPL
547654	2010 UW_{20}	—	October 28, 2010	Mount Lemmon	Mount Lemmon Survey	AST	1.2 km	MPC · JPL
547655	2010 UY_{20}	—	October 28, 2010	Mount Lemmon	Mount Lemmon Survey	·	510 m	MPC · JPL
547656	2010 UN_{21}	—	October 28, 2010	Catalina	CSS	·	1.7 km	MPC · JPL
547657	2010 UU_{22}	—	October 12, 2010	Mount Lemmon	Mount Lemmon Survey	·	2.1 km	MPC · JPL
547658	2010 UX_{22}	—	October 17, 2010	Mount Lemmon	Mount Lemmon Survey	·	1.5 km	MPC · JPL
547659	2010 UQ_{23}	—	October 28, 2010	Mount Lemmon	Mount Lemmon Survey	·	1.5 km	MPC · JPL
547660	2010 UD_{24}	—	March 27, 2008	Mount Lemmon	Mount Lemmon Survey	HOF	2.2 km	MPC · JPL
547661	2010 UB_{25}	—	October 14, 2010	Mount Lemmon	Mount Lemmon Survey	·	1.8 km	MPC · JPL
547662	2010 UZ_{25}	—	October 28, 2010	Mount Lemmon	Mount Lemmon Survey	·	1.7 km	MPC · JPL
547663	2010 UN_{26}	—	March 6, 2008	Mount Lemmon	Mount Lemmon Survey	·	2.4 km	MPC · JPL
547664 Ozdín	2010 UR_{29}	Ozdín	October 28, 2010	Piszkéstető	S. Kürti, K. Sárneczky	·	2.4 km	MPC · JPL
547665	2010 UA_{30}	—	November 16, 2001	Kitt Peak	Spacewatch	AGN	960 m	MPC · JPL
547666 Morgon	2010 UK_{30}	Morgon	March 3, 2005	Nogales	J.-C. Merlin	·	710 m	MPC · JPL
547667	2010 UL_{31}	—	October 9, 2010	Catalina	CSS	·	1.9 km	MPC · JPL
547668	2010 UJ_{34}	—	October 29, 2010	Mount Lemmon	Mount Lemmon Survey	·	1.9 km	MPC · JPL
547669	2010 UZ_{34}	—	July 30, 2005	Palomar	NEAT	·	2.0 km	MPC · JPL
547670	2010 UB_{36}	—	October 29, 2010	Mount Lemmon	Mount Lemmon Survey	·	1.8 km	MPC · JPL
547671	2010 UT_{39}	—	September 17, 2010	Mount Lemmon	Mount Lemmon Survey	MRX	720 m	MPC · JPL
547672	2010 UT_{46}	—	August 5, 2005	Palomar	NEAT	·	1.8 km	MPC · JPL
547673	2010 UU_{51}	—	October 13, 2010	Catalina	CSS	·	630 m	MPC · JPL
547674	2010 UV_{53}	—	September 16, 2010	Mount Lemmon	Mount Lemmon Survey	·	1.6 km	MPC · JPL
547675	2010 UC_{55}	—	April 1, 2008	Kitt Peak	Spacewatch	·	2.2 km	MPC · JPL
547676	2010 UX_{56}	—	October 14, 2010	Mount Lemmon	Mount Lemmon Survey	·	1.9 km	MPC · JPL
547677	2010 UE_{62}	—	October 13, 2010	Mount Lemmon	Mount Lemmon Survey	·	2.1 km	MPC · JPL
547678	2010 UF_{66}	—	October 31, 2010	Mount Lemmon	Mount Lemmon Survey	T_{j} (2.99) · 3:2	5.4 km	MPC · JPL
547679	2010 UR_{70}	—	September 11, 2010	Mount Lemmon	Mount Lemmon Survey	·	530 m	MPC · JPL
547680	2010 UA_{74}	—	October 13, 2010	Mount Lemmon	Mount Lemmon Survey	·	1.9 km	MPC · JPL
547681	2010 UX_{80}	—	October 24, 2005	Kitt Peak	Spacewatch	·	1.6 km	MPC · JPL
547682	2010 UZ_{80}	—	October 16, 2010	ESA OGS	ESA OGS	·	480 m	MPC · JPL
547683	2010 UB_{82}	—	September 23, 2005	Kitt Peak	Spacewatch	HOF	2.2 km	MPC · JPL
547684	2010 UG_{82}	—	October 11, 2010	Catalina	CSS	·	1.9 km	MPC · JPL
547685	2010 UP_{82}	—	September 23, 2005	Kitt Peak	Spacewatch	·	3.1 km	MPC · JPL
547686	2010 UA_{84}	—	October 17, 2010	Mount Lemmon	Mount Lemmon Survey	·	1.5 km	MPC · JPL
547687	2010 UM_{88}	—	October 12, 2010	Mount Lemmon	Mount Lemmon Survey	·	710 m	MPC · JPL
547688	2010 UM_{92}	—	August 10, 2010	Kitt Peak	Spacewatch	·	840 m	MPC · JPL
547689	2010 UY_{92}	—	October 13, 2010	Mount Lemmon	Mount Lemmon Survey	·	1.7 km	MPC · JPL
547690	2010 UD_{98}	—	October 19, 2010	Mount Lemmon	Mount Lemmon Survey	·	560 m	MPC · JPL
547691	2010 UZ_{98}	—	October 19, 2006	Kitt Peak	Spacewatch	·	1.7 km	MPC · JPL
547692	2010 UL_{101}	—	October 31, 2010	Mount Lemmon	Mount Lemmon Survey	·	560 m	MPC · JPL
547693	2010 UA_{104}	—	November 2, 2010	Mount Lemmon	Mount Lemmon Survey	·	1.3 km	MPC · JPL
547694	2010 UO_{108}	—	October 17, 2010	Mount Lemmon	Mount Lemmon Survey	·	1.5 km	MPC · JPL
547695	2010 UC_{110}	—	October 28, 2010	Mount Lemmon	Mount Lemmon Survey	·	630 m	MPC · JPL
547696	2010 UE_{110}	—	October 29, 2010	Mount Lemmon	Mount Lemmon Survey	·	1.5 km	MPC · JPL
547697	2010 UL_{110}	—	October 28, 2010	Catalina	CSS	·	1.6 km	MPC · JPL
547698	2010 UF_{111}	—	December 7, 2015	Haleakala	Pan-STARRS 1	·	1.6 km	MPC · JPL
547699	2010 UO_{111}	—	November 2, 2010	Mount Lemmon	Mount Lemmon Survey	·	560 m	MPC · JPL
547700	2010 UV_{111}	—	October 31, 2010	Mount Lemmon	Mount Lemmon Survey	·	1.6 km	MPC · JPL

== 547701–547800 ==
back to top

Designation			Discovery			Properties		Ref
Permanent	Provisional	Named after	Date	Site	Discoverer(s)	Category	Diam.	Ref
547701	2010 UY_{111}	—	October 28, 2010	Mount Lemmon	Mount Lemmon Survey	·	1.7 km	MPC · JPL
547702	2010 UD_{112}	—	October 31, 2010	Mount Lemmon	Mount Lemmon Survey	·	490 m	MPC · JPL
547703	2010 UE_{115}	—	May 12, 2013	Haleakala	Pan-STARRS 1	WIT	710 m	MPC · JPL
547704	2010 UF_{115}	—	October 30, 2010	Kitt Peak	Spacewatch	·	1.9 km	MPC · JPL
547705 Paálgyörgy	2010 UG_{115}	Paálgyörgy	October 31, 2010	Piszkéstető	K. Sárneczky, Z. Kuli	·	1.5 km	MPC · JPL
547706	2010 UV_{122}	—	October 31, 2010	Mount Lemmon	Mount Lemmon Survey	·	2.7 km	MPC · JPL
547707	2010 UK_{124}	—	October 17, 2010	Mount Lemmon	Mount Lemmon Survey	·	1.5 km	MPC · JPL
547708	2010 VC_{4}	—	November 1, 2010	Mount Lemmon	Mount Lemmon Survey	·	600 m	MPC · JPL
547709	2010 VX_{7}	—	April 5, 2008	Mount Lemmon	Mount Lemmon Survey	·	1.6 km	MPC · JPL
547710	2010 VN_{9}	—	November 1, 2010	Mount Lemmon	Mount Lemmon Survey	·	1.8 km	MPC · JPL
547711	2010 VL_{10}	—	October 12, 2010	Mount Lemmon	Mount Lemmon Survey	·	1.5 km	MPC · JPL
547712	2010 VM_{13}	—	September 11, 2010	Mount Lemmon	Mount Lemmon Survey	·	1.6 km	MPC · JPL
547713	2010 VL_{18}	—	November 16, 1995	Kitt Peak	Spacewatch	·	1.7 km	MPC · JPL
547714	2010 VX_{20}	—	November 8, 1991	Kitt Peak	Spacewatch	·	710 m	MPC · JPL
547715	2010 VQ_{26}	—	October 14, 2010	Mount Lemmon	Mount Lemmon Survey	·	470 m	MPC · JPL
547716	2010 VZ_{33}	—	October 29, 2010	Mount Lemmon	Mount Lemmon Survey	·	2.3 km	MPC · JPL
547717	2010 VD_{37}	—	August 1, 2010	WISE	WISE	·	1.6 km	MPC · JPL
547718	2010 VR_{37}	—	November 4, 2010	La Sagra	OAM	HOF	3.2 km	MPC · JPL
547719	2010 VE_{39}	—	May 28, 2000	Socorro	LINEAR	·	2.2 km	MPC · JPL
547720	2010 VG_{40}	—	September 20, 2001	Apache Point	SDSS	·	2.7 km	MPC · JPL
547721	2010 VZ_{40}	—	October 11, 2010	Mount Lemmon	Mount Lemmon Survey	·	1.4 km	MPC · JPL
547722	2010 VO_{42}	—	October 17, 2010	Mount Lemmon	Mount Lemmon Survey	·	1.4 km	MPC · JPL
547723	2010 VA_{43}	—	October 25, 2001	Kitt Peak	Spacewatch	NEM	1.9 km	MPC · JPL
547724	2010 VW_{43}	—	September 3, 2005	Mauna Kea	Veillet, C.	·	1.7 km	MPC · JPL
547725	2010 VL_{48}	—	October 19, 2010	Mount Lemmon	Mount Lemmon Survey	·	590 m	MPC · JPL
547726	2010 VQ_{49}	—	November 3, 2010	Kitt Peak	Spacewatch	·	1.8 km	MPC · JPL
547727	2010 VO_{50}	—	November 3, 2010	Mount Lemmon	Mount Lemmon Survey	·	540 m	MPC · JPL
547728	2010 VU_{50}	—	October 9, 2010	Kitt Peak	Spacewatch	·	1.4 km	MPC · JPL
547729	2010 VQ_{53}	—	November 3, 2010	Mount Lemmon	Mount Lemmon Survey	·	1.5 km	MPC · JPL
547730	2010 VF_{54}	—	November 3, 2010	Mount Lemmon	Mount Lemmon Survey	HOF	1.8 km	MPC · JPL
547731	2010 VQ_{57}	—	October 17, 2010	Mount Lemmon	Mount Lemmon Survey	526	1.8 km	MPC · JPL
547732	2010 VO_{58}	—	December 15, 2006	Mount Lemmon	Mount Lemmon Survey	EUN	1.4 km	MPC · JPL
547733	2010 VP_{58}	—	October 17, 2010	Mount Bigelow	CSS	·	2.1 km	MPC · JPL
547734	2010 VM_{62}	—	November 5, 2010	Kitt Peak	Spacewatch	·	1.9 km	MPC · JPL
547735	2010 VP_{63}	—	September 30, 2010	Mount Lemmon	Mount Lemmon Survey	·	1.4 km	MPC · JPL
547736	2010 VM_{64}	—	January 17, 2007	Kitt Peak	Spacewatch	PAD	1.7 km	MPC · JPL
547737	2010 VX_{72}	—	September 27, 2005	Kitt Peak	Spacewatch	·	2.0 km	MPC · JPL
547738	2010 VZ_{72}	—	August 25, 2005	Palomar	NEAT	·	2.4 km	MPC · JPL
547739	2010 VQ_{74}	—	July 26, 2009	Bergisch Gladbach	W. Bickel	BRA	1.7 km	MPC · JPL
547740	2010 VO_{80}	—	September 11, 2010	Mount Lemmon	Mount Lemmon Survey	·	1.5 km	MPC · JPL
547741	2010 VF_{82}	—	November 3, 2010	Mount Lemmon	Mount Lemmon Survey	HNS	1.5 km	MPC · JPL
547742	2010 VN_{85}	—	October 29, 2005	Mount Lemmon	Mount Lemmon Survey	HOF	2.6 km	MPC · JPL
547743	2010 VU_{89}	—	November 6, 2010	Kitt Peak	Spacewatch	·	1.4 km	MPC · JPL
547744	2010 VG_{90}	—	November 6, 2010	Kitt Peak	Spacewatch	·	2.1 km	MPC · JPL
547745	2010 VG_{92}	—	September 18, 2010	Mount Lemmon	Mount Lemmon Survey	·	1.4 km	MPC · JPL
547746	2010 VZ_{94}	—	November 7, 2010	Mount Lemmon	Mount Lemmon Survey	AGN	930 m	MPC · JPL
547747	2010 VE_{95}	—	December 5, 2002	Haleakala	NEAT	H	680 m	MPC · JPL
547748	2010 VW_{102}	—	November 5, 2010	Kitt Peak	Spacewatch	EMA	2.4 km	MPC · JPL
547749	2010 VA_{105}	—	November 5, 2010	Mount Lemmon	Mount Lemmon Survey	·	750 m	MPC · JPL
547750	2010 VR_{105}	—	April 27, 2009	Mount Lemmon	Mount Lemmon Survey	·	700 m	MPC · JPL
547751	2010 VP_{107}	—	November 6, 2010	Catalina	CSS	·	2.3 km	MPC · JPL
547752	2010 VQ_{110}	—	November 6, 2010	Mount Lemmon	Mount Lemmon Survey	·	1.5 km	MPC · JPL
547753	2010 VO_{113}	—	November 4, 2005	Mount Lemmon	Mount Lemmon Survey	·	1.4 km	MPC · JPL
547754	2010 VD_{115}	—	November 7, 2010	Mount Lemmon	Mount Lemmon Survey	·	670 m	MPC · JPL
547755	2010 VA_{120}	—	November 8, 2010	Kitt Peak	Spacewatch	DOR	2.0 km	MPC · JPL
547756	2010 VM_{121}	—	December 18, 2007	Mount Lemmon	Mount Lemmon Survey	·	680 m	MPC · JPL
547757	2010 VR_{121}	—	October 29, 2010	Mount Lemmon	Mount Lemmon Survey	·	2.0 km	MPC · JPL
547758	2010 VK_{124}	—	October 29, 2010	Mount Lemmon	Mount Lemmon Survey	·	1.5 km	MPC · JPL
547759	2010 VR_{128}	—	November 2, 2010	Mount Lemmon	Mount Lemmon Survey	·	2.3 km	MPC · JPL
547760	2010 VN_{132}	—	November 10, 2010	Kitt Peak	Spacewatch	NEM	2.1 km	MPC · JPL
547761	2010 VY_{138}	—	October 28, 2010	Mount Lemmon	Mount Lemmon Survey	·	1.6 km	MPC · JPL
547762	2010 VW_{144}	—	January 9, 2007	Mount Lemmon	Mount Lemmon Survey	HOF	1.9 km	MPC · JPL
547763	2010 VZ_{145}	—	October 17, 2010	Mount Lemmon	Mount Lemmon Survey	·	1.7 km	MPC · JPL
547764	2010 VP_{157}	—	October 13, 2010	Mount Lemmon	Mount Lemmon Survey	BRA	1.1 km	MPC · JPL
547765	2010 VA_{159}	—	November 8, 2010	Mount Lemmon	Mount Lemmon Survey	·	1.2 km	MPC · JPL
547766	2010 VS_{159}	—	October 2, 2000	Anderson Mesa	LONEOS	·	610 m	MPC · JPL
547767	2010 VW_{162}	—	December 2, 2005	Kitt Peak	Spacewatch	·	1.1 km	MPC · JPL
547768	2010 VF_{167}	—	November 10, 2010	Mount Lemmon	Mount Lemmon Survey	·	440 m	MPC · JPL
547769	2010 VQ_{168}	—	February 23, 2007	Catalina	CSS	·	2.0 km	MPC · JPL
547770	2010 VS_{169}	—	October 12, 2005	Kitt Peak	Spacewatch	AGN	1.0 km	MPC · JPL
547771	2010 VW_{173}	—	October 11, 2005	Kitt Peak	Spacewatch	HOF	2.8 km	MPC · JPL
547772	2010 VB_{178}	—	February 10, 2008	Kitt Peak	Spacewatch	·	1.9 km	MPC · JPL
547773	2010 VC_{179}	—	November 11, 2010	Mount Lemmon	Mount Lemmon Survey	·	1.5 km	MPC · JPL
547774	2010 VE_{179}	—	November 11, 2010	Mount Lemmon	Mount Lemmon Survey	·	2.2 km	MPC · JPL
547775	2010 VE_{180}	—	November 11, 2010	Mount Lemmon	Mount Lemmon Survey	·	1.7 km	MPC · JPL
547776	2010 VO_{180}	—	November 11, 2010	Mount Lemmon	Mount Lemmon Survey	·	460 m	MPC · JPL
547777	2010 VB_{181}	—	November 11, 2010	Mount Lemmon	Mount Lemmon Survey	EUN	1.3 km	MPC · JPL
547778	2010 VE_{181}	—	September 29, 2005	Kitt Peak	Spacewatch	·	1.8 km	MPC · JPL
547779 Pogo	2010 VJ_{181}	Pogo	December 21, 2006	Kitt Peak	L. H. Wasserman, M. W. Buie	AST	1.7 km	MPC · JPL
547780	2010 VJ_{183}	—	April 7, 2008	Mount Lemmon	Mount Lemmon Survey	MRX	1.2 km	MPC · JPL
547781	2010 VG_{185}	—	November 13, 2010	Mount Lemmon	Mount Lemmon Survey	·	1.6 km	MPC · JPL
547782	2010 VN_{186}	—	February 1, 2008	Mount Lemmon	Mount Lemmon Survey	·	2.2 km	MPC · JPL
547783	2010 VH_{188}	—	November 13, 2010	Mount Lemmon	Mount Lemmon Survey	·	1.5 km	MPC · JPL
547784	2010 VK_{189}	—	March 23, 1995	Kitt Peak	Spacewatch	·	550 m	MPC · JPL
547785	2010 VS_{189}	—	November 6, 2010	Kitt Peak	Spacewatch	·	1.8 km	MPC · JPL
547786	2010 VC_{190}	—	April 3, 2008	Mount Lemmon	Mount Lemmon Survey	·	2.3 km	MPC · JPL
547787	2010 VM_{192}	—	September 29, 2000	Kitt Peak	Spacewatch	·	1.9 km	MPC · JPL
547788	2010 VJ_{193}	—	November 2, 2010	Mount Lemmon	Mount Lemmon Survey	·	1.7 km	MPC · JPL
547789	2010 VL_{193}	—	November 12, 2010	Mount Lemmon	Mount Lemmon Survey	·	1.4 km	MPC · JPL
547790	2010 VS_{195}	—	November 11, 2010	Mount Lemmon	Mount Lemmon Survey	·	2.5 km	MPC · JPL
547791	2010 VV_{198}	—	October 14, 2010	Mount Lemmon	Mount Lemmon Survey	·	680 m	MPC · JPL
547792	2010 VY_{198}	—	October 29, 2010	Kitt Peak	Spacewatch	·	1.7 km	MPC · JPL
547793	2010 VD_{199}	—	June 15, 2009	Kitt Peak	Spacewatch	·	1.8 km	MPC · JPL
547794	2010 VR_{203}	—	November 1, 2010	Kitt Peak	Spacewatch	·	2.5 km	MPC · JPL
547795	2010 VJ_{206}	—	March 9, 2008	Kitt Peak	Spacewatch	·	2.3 km	MPC · JPL
547796	2010 VM_{206}	—	August 30, 2005	Palomar	NEAT	·	2.1 km	MPC · JPL
547797	2010 VZ_{206}	—	September 25, 2005	Palomar	NEAT	·	1.9 km	MPC · JPL
547798	2010 VA_{207}	—	July 5, 2005	Mount Lemmon	Mount Lemmon Survey	MRX	970 m	MPC · JPL
547799	2010 VD_{207}	—	August 30, 2005	Palomar	NEAT	·	2.4 km	MPC · JPL
547800	2010 VP_{208}	—	September 16, 2010	Mount Lemmon	Mount Lemmon Survey	GEF	1.2 km	MPC · JPL

== 547801–547900 ==
back to top

Designation			Discovery			Properties		Ref
Permanent	Provisional	Named after	Date	Site	Discoverer(s)	Category	Diam.	Ref
547801	2010 VD_{211}	—	October 30, 2010	Kitt Peak	Spacewatch	·	1.4 km	MPC · JPL
547802	2010 VR_{211}	—	June 21, 2005	Palomar	NEAT	·	2.0 km	MPC · JPL
547803	2010 VX_{211}	—	October 31, 2006	Mount Lemmon	Mount Lemmon Survey	EUN	1.4 km	MPC · JPL
547804	2010 VX_{212}	—	October 14, 2010	Mount Lemmon	Mount Lemmon Survey	·	780 m	MPC · JPL
547805	2010 VZ_{212}	—	January 18, 2012	Kitt Peak	Spacewatch	·	1.7 km	MPC · JPL
547806	2010 VJ_{214}	—	November 3, 2010	Mount Lemmon	Mount Lemmon Survey	·	2.5 km	MPC · JPL
547807	2010 VT_{214}	—	October 12, 2010	Mount Lemmon	Mount Lemmon Survey	WIT	890 m	MPC · JPL
547808	2010 VB_{215}	—	August 28, 2005	Kitt Peak	Spacewatch	·	1.4 km	MPC · JPL
547809	2010 VC_{215}	—	January 19, 2012	Haleakala	Pan-STARRS 1	AGN	1.1 km	MPC · JPL
547810	2010 VE_{218}	—	November 12, 2010	Mount Lemmon	Mount Lemmon Survey	JUN	1.1 km	MPC · JPL
547811	2010 VK_{219}	—	September 16, 2010	Mount Lemmon	Mount Lemmon Survey	·	1.8 km	MPC · JPL
547812	2010 VR_{223}	—	November 3, 2010	Kitt Peak	Spacewatch	·	1.6 km	MPC · JPL
547813	2010 VS_{225}	—	September 2, 2005	Palomar	NEAT	·	2.8 km	MPC · JPL
547814	2010 VK_{226}	—	October 1, 1995	Kitt Peak	Spacewatch	·	1.7 km	MPC · JPL
547815	2010 VT_{226}	—	November 2, 2010	Mount Lemmon	Mount Lemmon Survey	(12739)	1.4 km	MPC · JPL
547816	2010 VB_{227}	—	September 26, 2005	Kitt Peak	Spacewatch	·	1.4 km	MPC · JPL
547817	2010 VY_{227}	—	November 14, 2010	Mount Lemmon	Mount Lemmon Survey	·	1.5 km	MPC · JPL
547818	2010 VE_{228}	—	November 11, 2010	Mount Lemmon	Mount Lemmon Survey	·	2.1 km	MPC · JPL
547819	2010 VH_{229}	—	August 28, 2014	Haleakala	Pan-STARRS 1	·	2.1 km	MPC · JPL
547820	2010 VR_{229}	—	January 22, 2012	Haleakala	Pan-STARRS 1	·	2.0 km	MPC · JPL
547821	2010 VE_{230}	—	October 9, 2010	Kitt Peak	Spacewatch	·	1.8 km	MPC · JPL
547822	2010 VG_{230}	—	March 20, 2012	Haleakala	Pan-STARRS 1	·	1.9 km	MPC · JPL
547823	2010 VM_{230}	—	October 5, 2013	Haleakala	Pan-STARRS 1	·	580 m	MPC · JPL
547824	2010 VU_{230}	—	April 7, 2014	Mount Lemmon	Mount Lemmon Survey	T_{j} (2.98) · 3:2	6.0 km	MPC · JPL
547825	2010 VC_{232}	—	November 2, 2010	Mount Lemmon	Mount Lemmon Survey	·	2.3 km	MPC · JPL
547826	2010 VJ_{232}	—	November 2, 2010	Mount Lemmon	Mount Lemmon Survey	AGN	990 m	MPC · JPL
547827	2010 VV_{234}	—	October 19, 2015	Haleakala	Pan-STARRS 1	·	1.7 km	MPC · JPL
547828	2010 VD_{236}	—	November 3, 2010	Mount Lemmon	Mount Lemmon Survey	·	1.5 km	MPC · JPL
547829	2010 VF_{236}	—	November 8, 2010	Mount Lemmon	Mount Lemmon Survey	·	1.5 km	MPC · JPL
547830	2010 VT_{238}	—	November 2, 2010	Mount Lemmon	Mount Lemmon Survey	DOR	2.2 km	MPC · JPL
547831	2010 VW_{238}	—	November 9, 2010	Mount Lemmon	Mount Lemmon Survey	HOF	1.9 km	MPC · JPL
547832	2010 VH_{239}	—	November 3, 2010	Mount Lemmon	Mount Lemmon Survey	·	1.4 km	MPC · JPL
547833	2010 VW_{239}	—	December 9, 2015	Haleakala	Pan-STARRS 1	HOF	1.8 km	MPC · JPL
547834	2010 VW_{240}	—	September 17, 2010	Mount Lemmon	Mount Lemmon Survey	·	1.6 km	MPC · JPL
547835	2010 VN_{241}	—	November 8, 2010	Mount Lemmon	Mount Lemmon Survey	3:2	5.5 km	MPC · JPL
547836	2010 VR_{247}	—	November 11, 2010	Kitt Peak	Spacewatch	AGN	880 m	MPC · JPL
547837	2010 VN_{249}	—	November 15, 2010	Mount Lemmon	Mount Lemmon Survey	NAE	2.4 km	MPC · JPL
547838	2010 VQ_{249}	—	November 12, 2010	Mount Lemmon	Mount Lemmon Survey	·	1.6 km	MPC · JPL
547839	2010 VL_{250}	—	November 6, 2010	Mount Lemmon	Mount Lemmon Survey	·	1.5 km	MPC · JPL
547840	2010 VV_{250}	—	November 11, 2010	Mount Lemmon	Mount Lemmon Survey	·	1.7 km	MPC · JPL
547841	2010 VZ_{251}	—	September 30, 2010	Mount Lemmon	Mount Lemmon Survey	·	540 m	MPC · JPL
547842	2010 VV_{253}	—	November 13, 2010	Kitt Peak	Spacewatch	·	2.5 km	MPC · JPL
547843	2010 VW_{253}	—	November 14, 2010	Mount Lemmon	Mount Lemmon Survey	VER	2.6 km	MPC · JPL
547844	2010 VL_{254}	—	November 6, 2010	Kitt Peak	Spacewatch	·	2.9 km	MPC · JPL
547845	2010 VY_{254}	—	November 8, 2010	Kitt Peak	Spacewatch	L4 · ERY	7.0 km	MPC · JPL
547846	2010 VT_{256}	—	September 19, 2003	Kitt Peak	Spacewatch	·	490 m	MPC · JPL
547847	2010 VL_{258}	—	November 5, 2010	Kitt Peak	Spacewatch	·	2.7 km	MPC · JPL
547848	2010 WP_{2}	—	November 12, 2010	Kitt Peak	Spacewatch	AGN	950 m	MPC · JPL
547849	2010 WM_{5}	—	November 27, 2010	Mount Lemmon	Mount Lemmon Survey	·	1.6 km	MPC · JPL
547850	2010 WO_{7}	—	November 1, 2010	Mount Lemmon	Mount Lemmon Survey	·	1.7 km	MPC · JPL
547851	2010 WS_{7}	—	November 10, 2010	Mount Lemmon	Mount Lemmon Survey	·	530 m	MPC · JPL
547852	2010 WE_{8}	—	October 5, 2005	Catalina	CSS	·	1.9 km	MPC · JPL
547853	2010 WR_{10}	—	August 10, 2005	Siding Spring	SSS	JUN	1.2 km	MPC · JPL
547854	2010 WC_{12}	—	December 21, 2006	Mount Lemmon	Mount Lemmon Survey	·	2.1 km	MPC · JPL
547855	2010 WW_{14}	—	September 18, 2010	Mount Lemmon	Mount Lemmon Survey	·	2.4 km	MPC · JPL
547856	2010 WK_{16}	—	January 19, 2012	Haleakala	Pan-STARRS 1	·	1.6 km	MPC · JPL
547857	2010 WL_{16}	—	March 26, 2003	Palomar	NEAT	·	2.0 km	MPC · JPL
547858	2010 WW_{24}	—	November 27, 2010	Mount Lemmon	Mount Lemmon Survey	·	470 m	MPC · JPL
547859	2010 WP_{25}	—	November 14, 2010	Kitt Peak	Spacewatch	·	1.9 km	MPC · JPL
547860	2010 WT_{25}	—	November 27, 2010	Mount Lemmon	Mount Lemmon Survey	·	710 m	MPC · JPL
547861	2010 WU_{27}	—	October 6, 2005	Mount Lemmon	Mount Lemmon Survey	·	1.6 km	MPC · JPL
547862	2010 WO_{29}	—	November 14, 2010	Catalina	CSS	·	570 m	MPC · JPL
547863	2010 WX_{30}	—	November 13, 2010	Kitt Peak	Spacewatch	·	2.3 km	MPC · JPL
547864	2010 WK_{34}	—	October 15, 2001	Palomar	NEAT	T_{j} (2.98) · 3:2	6.7 km	MPC · JPL
547865	2010 WN_{34}	—	January 27, 2007	Kitt Peak	Spacewatch	AST	1.5 km	MPC · JPL
547866	2010 WN_{36}	—	November 27, 2010	Mount Lemmon	Mount Lemmon Survey	·	2.1 km	MPC · JPL
547867	2010 WU_{37}	—	March 29, 2008	Kitt Peak	Spacewatch	AEO	1.1 km	MPC · JPL
547868	2010 WP_{38}	—	October 11, 2005	Kitt Peak	Spacewatch	·	1.9 km	MPC · JPL
547869	2010 WN_{39}	—	December 21, 2006	Kitt Peak	L. H. Wasserman, M. W. Buie	AGN	1.1 km	MPC · JPL
547870	2010 WP_{40}	—	November 14, 2010	Kitt Peak	Spacewatch	·	470 m	MPC · JPL
547871	2010 WZ_{40}	—	November 14, 2010	Kitt Peak	Spacewatch	·	580 m	MPC · JPL
547872	2010 WF_{41}	—	December 14, 2001	Socorro	LINEAR	·	2.0 km	MPC · JPL
547873	2010 WP_{42}	—	November 27, 2010	Mount Lemmon	Mount Lemmon Survey	·	600 m	MPC · JPL
547874	2010 WA_{43}	—	November 27, 2010	Mount Lemmon	Mount Lemmon Survey	·	2.0 km	MPC · JPL
547875	2010 WB_{43}	—	September 30, 2005	Mount Lemmon	Mount Lemmon Survey	PAD	1.4 km	MPC · JPL
547876	2010 WU_{46}	—	November 27, 2010	Mount Lemmon	Mount Lemmon Survey	·	1.7 km	MPC · JPL
547877	2010 WW_{46}	—	April 29, 2003	Kitt Peak	Spacewatch	MRX	980 m	MPC · JPL
547878	2010 WB_{49}	—	March 23, 2002	Kitt Peak	Spacewatch	·	860 m	MPC · JPL
547879	2010 WT_{49}	—	November 6, 2005	Mount Lemmon	Mount Lemmon Survey	KOR	1.0 km	MPC · JPL
547880	2010 WN_{50}	—	November 26, 2005	Kitt Peak	Spacewatch	·	2.0 km	MPC · JPL
547881	2010 WW_{50}	—	September 11, 2005	Kitt Peak	Spacewatch	·	1.6 km	MPC · JPL
547882	2010 WP_{51}	—	November 2, 2010	Kitt Peak	Spacewatch	·	1.7 km	MPC · JPL
547883	2010 WW_{51}	—	November 28, 2010	Mount Lemmon	Mount Lemmon Survey	·	720 m	MPC · JPL
547884	2010 WA_{54}	—	July 15, 2004	Cerro Tololo	Deep Ecliptic Survey	L4	8.7 km	MPC · JPL
547885	2010 WZ_{54}	—	September 30, 2005	Anderson Mesa	LONEOS	MRX	960 m	MPC · JPL
547886	2010 WP_{59}	—	November 30, 2010	Mount Lemmon	Mount Lemmon Survey	·	1.8 km	MPC · JPL
547887	2010 WZ_{60}	—	April 9, 2002	Palomar	NEAT	·	670 m	MPC · JPL
547888	2010 WL_{68}	—	September 22, 2009	Mount Lemmon	Mount Lemmon Survey	L4	7.8 km	MPC · JPL
547889	2010 WT_{68}	—	November 30, 2010	Mount Lemmon	Mount Lemmon Survey	·	2.1 km	MPC · JPL
547890	2010 WE_{70}	—	July 30, 2005	Palomar	NEAT	·	1.8 km	MPC · JPL
547891	2010 WC_{74}	—	October 8, 2005	Kitt Peak	Spacewatch	·	1.5 km	MPC · JPL
547892	2010 WG_{75}	—	February 14, 2005	Kitt Peak	Spacewatch	·	670 m	MPC · JPL
547893	2010 WN_{75}	—	November 18, 2010	Haleakala	Pan-STARRS 1	cubewano (hot)	335 km	MPC · JPL
547894	2010 WQ_{76}	—	August 20, 2014	Haleakala	Pan-STARRS 1	·	1.7 km	MPC · JPL
547895	2010 XA_{5}	—	January 17, 2007	Kitt Peak	Spacewatch	HOF	2.3 km	MPC · JPL
547896	2010 XQ_{6}	—	November 12, 2010	Mount Lemmon	Mount Lemmon Survey	·	1.8 km	MPC · JPL
547897	2010 XX_{6}	—	January 23, 2007	Kanab	Sherdian, E.	GEF	1.3 km	MPC · JPL
547898	2010 XR_{8}	—	December 2, 2010	Mount Lemmon	Mount Lemmon Survey	EOS	1.4 km	MPC · JPL
547899	2010 XE_{9}	—	December 2, 2010	Mount Lemmon	Mount Lemmon Survey	BRA	1.4 km	MPC · JPL
547900	2010 XA_{10}	—	December 3, 2010	Mount Lemmon	Mount Lemmon Survey	·	490 m	MPC · JPL

== 547901–548000 ==
back to top

Designation			Discovery			Properties		Ref
Permanent	Provisional	Named after	Date	Site	Discoverer(s)	Category	Diam.	Ref
547901	2010 XF_{10}	—	December 3, 2010	Mount Lemmon	Mount Lemmon Survey	HOF	2.3 km	MPC · JPL
547902	2010 XK_{20}	—	April 1, 2008	Kitt Peak	Spacewatch	·	1.8 km	MPC · JPL
547903	2010 XR_{22}	—	April 29, 2008	Mount Lemmon	Mount Lemmon Survey	·	1.7 km	MPC · JPL
547904	2010 XL_{28}	—	October 1, 2005	Kitt Peak	Spacewatch	AGN	1.1 km	MPC · JPL
547905	2010 XX_{28}	—	December 18, 2007	Kitt Peak	Spacewatch	·	560 m	MPC · JPL
547906	2010 XN_{32}	—	November 13, 2010	Kitt Peak	Spacewatch	·	1.8 km	MPC · JPL
547907	2010 XC_{33}	—	November 12, 2010	Mount Lemmon	Mount Lemmon Survey	·	2.2 km	MPC · JPL
547908	2010 XJ_{33}	—	October 31, 2010	Kitt Peak	Spacewatch	·	740 m	MPC · JPL
547909	2010 XK_{34}	—	December 2, 2010	Mount Lemmon	Mount Lemmon Survey	·	1.6 km	MPC · JPL
547910	2010 XJ_{35}	—	September 3, 2005	Catalina	CSS	·	2.1 km	MPC · JPL
547911	2010 XN_{35}	—	April 9, 2003	Palomar	NEAT	·	1.9 km	MPC · JPL
547912	2010 XX_{35}	—	November 22, 2005	Kitt Peak	Spacewatch	·	2.1 km	MPC · JPL
547913	2010 XS_{36}	—	December 3, 2010	Mount Lemmon	Mount Lemmon Survey	·	1.9 km	MPC · JPL
547914	2010 XN_{38}	—	November 25, 2005	Catalina	CSS	GAL	1.7 km	MPC · JPL
547915	2010 XG_{41}	—	December 5, 2010	Kitt Peak	Spacewatch	·	1.8 km	MPC · JPL
547916	2010 XT_{47}	—	December 5, 2007	Mount Lemmon	Mount Lemmon Survey	·	590 m	MPC · JPL
547917	2010 XG_{49}	—	July 30, 2005	Palomar	NEAT	·	2.1 km	MPC · JPL
547918	2010 XF_{51}	—	January 7, 2006	Mount Lemmon	Mount Lemmon Survey	·	1.9 km	MPC · JPL
547919	2010 XW_{55}	—	November 9, 2004	Catalina	CSS	EOS	2.8 km	MPC · JPL
547920	2010 XJ_{57}	—	December 11, 2010	Mount Lemmon	Mount Lemmon Survey	·	2.5 km	MPC · JPL
547921	2010 XR_{57}	—	December 8, 2010	Kitt Peak	Spacewatch	·	1.8 km	MPC · JPL
547922	2010 XJ_{72}	—	December 15, 2010	Mount Lemmon	Mount Lemmon Survey	·	1.7 km	MPC · JPL
547923	2010 XP_{73}	—	November 8, 2010	Mount Lemmon	Mount Lemmon Survey	EOS	1.9 km	MPC · JPL
547924	2010 XE_{77}	—	January 1, 2008	Kitt Peak	Spacewatch	·	550 m	MPC · JPL
547925	2010 XB_{78}	—	December 4, 2010	Mount Lemmon	Mount Lemmon Survey	·	1.8 km	MPC · JPL
547926	2010 XK_{79}	—	August 16, 2009	Kitt Peak	Spacewatch	·	1.7 km	MPC · JPL
547927	2010 XB_{82}	—	November 10, 2010	Mount Lemmon	Mount Lemmon Survey	·	530 m	MPC · JPL
547928	2010 XS_{84}	—	March 25, 2003	Kitt Peak	Spacewatch	·	2.5 km	MPC · JPL
547929	2010 XF_{88}	—	December 14, 2010	Mount Lemmon	Mount Lemmon Survey	·	2.1 km	MPC · JPL
547930	2010 XR_{88}	—	January 6, 2006	Catalina	CSS	·	2.2 km	MPC · JPL
547931	2010 XU_{91}	—	September 19, 2003	Palomar	NEAT	EOS	2.1 km	MPC · JPL
547932	2010 XN_{92}	—	December 3, 2010	Mount Lemmon	Mount Lemmon Survey	GEF	1.1 km	MPC · JPL
547933	2010 XE_{93}	—	December 14, 2010	Mount Lemmon	Mount Lemmon Survey	KOR	990 m	MPC · JPL
547934	2010 XV_{93}	—	December 14, 2010	Mount Lemmon	Mount Lemmon Survey	·	3.2 km	MPC · JPL
547935	2010 XY_{93}	—	December 3, 2010	Mount Lemmon	Mount Lemmon Survey	·	2.3 km	MPC · JPL
547936	2010 XZ_{93}	—	November 20, 2003	Socorro	LINEAR	·	590 m	MPC · JPL
547937	2010 XE_{94}	—	December 4, 2010	Mount Lemmon	Mount Lemmon Survey	·	2.0 km	MPC · JPL
547938	2010 XV_{94}	—	November 23, 2014	Haleakala	Pan-STARRS 1	EUN	1.3 km	MPC · JPL
547939	2010 XT_{95}	—	December 10, 2010	Mount Lemmon	Mount Lemmon Survey	EOS	1.7 km	MPC · JPL
547940	2010 XN_{96}	—	August 20, 2014	Haleakala	Pan-STARRS 1	·	1.8 km	MPC · JPL
547941	2010 XO_{96}	—	December 11, 2010	Mount Lemmon	Mount Lemmon Survey	H	440 m	MPC · JPL
547942	2010 XX_{96}	—	September 4, 2014	Haleakala	Pan-STARRS 1	NAE	1.9 km	MPC · JPL
547943	2010 XK_{97}	—	July 31, 2014	Haleakala	Pan-STARRS 1	·	1.7 km	MPC · JPL
547944	2010 XX_{97}	—	July 25, 2014	Haleakala	Pan-STARRS 1	·	2.3 km	MPC · JPL
547945	2010 XX_{98}	—	December 8, 2010	Kitt Peak	Spacewatch	·	950 m	MPC · JPL
547946	2010 XZ_{99}	—	December 2, 2010	Mount Lemmon	Mount Lemmon Survey	·	1.9 km	MPC · JPL
547947	2010 XH_{100}	—	December 8, 2010	Kitt Peak	Spacewatch	·	1.8 km	MPC · JPL
547948	2010 XQ_{101}	—	January 28, 2017	Haleakala	Pan-STARRS 1	·	2.4 km	MPC · JPL
547949	2010 XS_{101}	—	February 21, 2012	Mount Lemmon	Mount Lemmon Survey	·	1.7 km	MPC · JPL
547950	2010 XP_{103}	—	December 9, 2010	Mount Lemmon	Mount Lemmon Survey	·	1.3 km	MPC · JPL
547951	2010 XH_{105}	—	June 26, 2014	Haleakala	Pan-STARRS 1	·	1.9 km	MPC · JPL
547952	2010 XY_{107}	—	December 3, 2010	Mount Lemmon	Mount Lemmon Survey	KOR	1.1 km	MPC · JPL
547953	2010 XU_{108}	—	December 4, 2010	Mount Lemmon	Mount Lemmon Survey	·	1.3 km	MPC · JPL
547954	2010 XW_{108}	—	December 2, 2010	Mount Lemmon	Mount Lemmon Survey	·	470 m	MPC · JPL
547955	2010 XU_{110}	—	December 14, 2010	Mount Lemmon	Mount Lemmon Survey	·	680 m	MPC · JPL
547956	2010 XM_{111}	—	December 4, 2010	Mount Lemmon	Mount Lemmon Survey	NYS	510 m	MPC · JPL
547957	2010 XS_{111}	—	December 3, 2010	Mount Lemmon	Mount Lemmon Survey	L4 · ERY	7.5 km	MPC · JPL
547958	2010 XV_{111}	—	December 2, 2010	Mount Lemmon	Mount Lemmon Survey	·	550 m	MPC · JPL
547959	2010 XW_{111}	—	December 10, 2010	Mount Lemmon	Mount Lemmon Survey	·	1.1 km	MPC · JPL
547960	2010 XX_{111}	—	December 14, 2010	Mount Lemmon	Mount Lemmon Survey	·	520 m	MPC · JPL
547961	2010 XA_{112}	—	December 6, 2010	Kitt Peak	Spacewatch	V	550 m	MPC · JPL
547962	2010 YN_{1}	—	November 25, 2000	Kitt Peak	Spacewatch	·	920 m	MPC · JPL
547963	2010 YU_{2}	—	December 30, 2010	Piszkés-tető	K. Sárneczky, Z. Kuli	NAE	2.3 km	MPC · JPL
547964	2010 YZ_{2}	—	December 30, 2010	Piszkés-tető	K. Sárneczky, Z. Kuli	·	630 m	MPC · JPL
547965	2010 YM_{3}	—	December 14, 2010	Catalina	CSS	PHO	1.2 km	MPC · JPL
547966	2010 YR_{5}	—	December 8, 2010	Mount Lemmon	Mount Lemmon Survey	H	480 m	MPC · JPL
547967	2010 AG_{7}	—	January 6, 2010	Kitt Peak	Spacewatch	KOR	1.2 km	MPC · JPL
547968	2010 AJ_{8}	—	January 12, 1996	Kitt Peak	Spacewatch	·	880 m	MPC · JPL
547969	2010 AE_{9}	—	January 6, 2010	Kitt Peak	Spacewatch	·	1.5 km	MPC · JPL
547970	2010 AD_{10}	—	July 30, 2008	Mount Lemmon	Mount Lemmon Survey	·	1.6 km	MPC · JPL
547971	2010 AC_{11}	—	January 6, 2010	Mount Lemmon	Mount Lemmon Survey	·	2.0 km	MPC · JPL
547972	2010 AZ_{12}	—	September 26, 2005	Palomar	NEAT	V	640 m	MPC · JPL
547973	2010 AY_{16}	—	November 23, 2009	Mount Lemmon	Mount Lemmon Survey	·	1.9 km	MPC · JPL
547974	2010 AF_{17}	—	December 20, 2009	Mount Lemmon	Mount Lemmon Survey	·	820 m	MPC · JPL
547975	2010 AM_{17}	—	December 18, 2009	Mount Lemmon	Mount Lemmon Survey	·	900 m	MPC · JPL
547976	2010 AM_{20}	—	December 15, 2009	Mount Lemmon	Mount Lemmon Survey	·	3.6 km	MPC · JPL
547977	2010 AN_{20}	—	January 30, 2003	Anderson Mesa	LONEOS	·	990 m	MPC · JPL
547978	2010 AW_{20}	—	October 9, 2008	Mount Lemmon	Mount Lemmon Survey	·	1.9 km	MPC · JPL
547979	2010 AV_{22}	—	January 6, 2010	Kitt Peak	Spacewatch	·	1.5 km	MPC · JPL
547980	2010 AE_{24}	—	December 20, 2009	Mount Lemmon	Mount Lemmon Survey	·	1.9 km	MPC · JPL
547981	2010 AW_{26}	—	December 19, 2009	Kitt Peak	Spacewatch	·	900 m	MPC · JPL
547982	2010 AO_{27}	—	January 6, 2010	Mount Lemmon	Mount Lemmon Survey	·	760 m	MPC · JPL
547983	2010 AZ_{27}	—	December 25, 2009	Kitt Peak	Spacewatch	·	870 m	MPC · JPL
547984	2010 AA_{29}	—	November 21, 2009	Mount Lemmon	Mount Lemmon Survey	URS	3.7 km	MPC · JPL
547985	2010 AW_{29}	—	October 31, 2005	Catalina	CSS	·	990 m	MPC · JPL
547986	2010 AB_{32}	—	January 6, 2010	Kitt Peak	Spacewatch	·	2.3 km	MPC · JPL
547987	2010 AR_{33}	—	January 7, 2010	Kitt Peak	Spacewatch	·	930 m	MPC · JPL
547988	2010 AP_{34}	—	January 7, 2010	Kitt Peak	Spacewatch	EOS	1.7 km	MPC · JPL
547989	2010 AJ_{36}	—	January 30, 2006	Catalina	CSS	·	950 m	MPC · JPL
547990	2010 AD_{42}	—	January 6, 2010	Kitt Peak	Spacewatch	·	2.6 km	MPC · JPL
547991	2010 AM_{42}	—	March 14, 2007	Mount Lemmon	Mount Lemmon Survey	V	490 m	MPC · JPL
547992	2010 AW_{44}	—	December 10, 2009	Mount Lemmon	Mount Lemmon Survey	·	1.8 km	MPC · JPL
547993	2010 AH_{45}	—	January 7, 2010	Mount Lemmon	Mount Lemmon Survey	·	770 m	MPC · JPL
547994	2010 AT_{48}	—	January 8, 2010	Kitt Peak	Spacewatch	EOS	1.9 km	MPC · JPL
547995	2010 AJ_{49}	—	January 8, 2010	Kitt Peak	Spacewatch	·	2.5 km	MPC · JPL
547996	2010 AA_{58}	—	October 7, 2008	Mount Lemmon	Mount Lemmon Survey	EOS	1.9 km	MPC · JPL
547997	2010 AB_{58}	—	January 11, 2010	Mount Lemmon	Mount Lemmon Survey	·	1.9 km	MPC · JPL
547998	2010 AC_{63}	—	December 18, 2004	Mount Lemmon	Mount Lemmon Survey	·	1.7 km	MPC · JPL
547999	2010 AS_{64}	—	January 10, 2010	Kitt Peak	Spacewatch	·	1.3 km	MPC · JPL
548000	2010 AW_{66}	—	January 11, 2010	Kitt Peak	Spacewatch	·	2.5 km	MPC · JPL

back to top

== Meaning of names ==
As minor planet discoveries are confirmed, they are given a permanent number by the IAU's Minor Planet Center (MPC), and the discoverers can then submit names for them, following the IAU's naming conventions. The list below concerns those minor planets in the specified number-range that have received names, and explains the meanings of those names.

Official naming citations of newly named small Solar System bodies are approved and published in a bulletin by IAU's Working Group for Small Bodies Nomenclature (WGSBN). Before May 2021, citations were published in MPC's Minor Planet Circulars for many decades. Recent citations can also be found on the JPL Small-Body Database (SBDB). Until his death in 2016, German astronomer Lutz D. Schmadel compiled these citations into the Dictionary of Minor Planet Names (DMP) and regularly updated the collection.

Based on Paul Herget's The Names of the Minor Planets, Schmadel also researched the unclear origin of numerous asteroids, most of which had been named prior to World War II. This article incorporates text from this source, which is in the public domain: SBDB New namings may only be added to this list below after official publication as the preannouncement of names is condemned. The WGSBN publishes a comprehensive guideline for the naming rules of non-cometary small Solar System bodies.

Named minor planet	Provisional	This minor planet was named for...	Ref · Catalog
547345 Kennethchambers	2010 LA_{153}	Kenneth C. Chambers (b. 1956), an American astronomer.	IAU · 547345
547398 Turánpál	2010 RX_{40}	Pál Turán (1910–1976) was a Hungarian mathematician who achieved significant results in the field of number theory, graph theory and classical analysis. His best-known result is Turán's theorem in graph theory.	IAU · 547398
547400 Szakcsilakatos	2010 RD_{44}	Béla Szakcsi Lakatos (1943–2022), a Hungarian jazz pianist, keyboardist, arranger and composer	IAU · 547400
547508 Perehorts	2010 SF_{13}	Pere Horts Font (1956–2024), a Catalan scientific disseminator of astronomy.	IAU · 547508
547599 Virághalmy	2010 TM_{163}	Géza Virághalmy (1932–2019) was a Hungarian physicist and astronomer. He was the long-time technical chief at the Konkoly Observatory and introduced CCD astronomy at the Piszkéstető Station.	IAU · 547599
547612 Károligáspár	2010 TA_{193}	Gáspár Károli (1529–1592), a Hungarian Calvinist pastor, author of the first complete Hungarian translation of the Bible.	IAU · 547612
547664 Ozdín	2010 UR_{29}	Daniel Ozdín (b. 1972), a Slovak mineralogist.	IAU · 547664
547666 Morgon	2010 UK_{30}	Villié-Morgon, is a small French village in the Rhône department, known for its appellations of the Beaujolais vineyard.	IAU · 547666
547705 Paálgyörgy	2010 UG_{115}	György Paál (1934–1992), a Hungarian physicist and cosmologist. He made significant contributions to theories on formation of galaxy clusters, the origin of the primordial universe, and the expansion of the universe.	IAU · 547705
547779 Pogo	2010 VJ_{181}	A. Oscar Pogo, prominent Argentinian-American medical researcher and hematologist at the New York Blood Center.	IAU · 547779
