= William G. Tifft =

American astronomer

William G. Tifft (April 5, 1932 – May 4, 2022) was an astronomer at the University of Arizona. His main interests were in galaxies, superclusters and redshift quantization. He was influential in the development of the first redshift surveys, and was an early proponent of crewed space astronomy, conducted at a proposed Moon base for example. In retirement, he was a principal scientist with The Scientific Association for the Study of Time in Physics and Cosmology (SASTPC).

He had an A.B. in Astronomy from Harvard University (1954), and Ph.D. in Astronomy from the California Institute of Technology (1958) where he wrote his dissertation on photoelectric photometry.

== Redshift quantization ==
Based on observations of nearby galaxies, Tifft proposed that the redshifts of galaxies are quantized, or that they occur preferentially as multiples of a set number. These findings on redshift quantization were originally published in 1976 and 1977 in the Astrophysical Journal. The ideas were controversial when originally proposed; the editors of the Astrophysical Journal included a note in one of the papers stating that they could neither find errors within the analysis nor endorse the analysis. Subsequently, Tifft and Cocke put forward a theory to try to explain the quantization. Tifft's results were supported by Martin Croasdale, who claimed the effect to be statistically significant and the same over the whole sky, and later Napier and Guthrie. Since the initial publication of these results, Tifft's findings have been used by others, such as Halton Arp, in making an alternative explanation to the Big Bang Theory, which states that galaxies are redshifted because the universe is expanding. However, they have not found widespread support and are now dismissed by the majority of astronomers. Tifft himself, when interviewed for the popular science magazine Discover in 1993, stated that he was not necessarily claiming that the universe was not expanding.
