= Redshift quantization =

Physical hypothesis

Redshift quantization, also referred to as redshift periodicity, redshift discretization, preferred redshifts and redshift-magnitude bands, is the hypothesis that the redshifts of cosmologically distant objects (in particular galaxies and quasars) tend to cluster around multiples of some particular value.

In standard inflationary cosmological models, the redshift of cosmological bodies is ascribed to the expansion of the universe, with greater redshift indicating greater cosmic distance from the Earth (see Hubble's law). This is referred to as cosmological redshift and is one of the main pieces of evidence for the Big Bang. Quantized redshifts of objects would indicate, under Hubble's law, that astronomical objects are arranged in a quantized pattern around the Earth. It is more widely posited that the redshift is unrelated to cosmic expansion and is the outcome of some other physical mechanism, referred to as "intrinsic redshift" or "non-cosmological redshift".

In 1973, astronomer William G. Tifft was the first to report evidence of this pattern. Subsequent discourse focused upon whether redshift surveys of quasars (QSOs) have produced evidence of quantization in excess of what is expected due to selection effect or galactic clustering. The idea has been on the fringes of astronomy since the mid-1990s and is now discounted by the vast majority of astronomers, but a few scientists who espouse nonstandard cosmological models, including those who reject the Big Bang theory, have referred to evidence of redshift quantization as reason to reject conventional accounts of the origin and evolution of the universe.

== Original investigation by William G. Tifft ==
György Paál (for QSOs, 1971) and William G. Tifft (for galaxies) were the first to investigate possible redshift quantization, referring to it as "redshift-magnitude banding correlation". In 1973, he wrote:

"Using more than 200 redshifts in Coma, Perseus, and A2199, the presence of a distinct band-related periodicity in redshifts is indicated. Finally, a new sample of accurate redshifts of bright Coma galaxies on a single band is presented, which shows a strong redshift periodicity of 220 km s^{−1}. An upper limit of 20 km s^{−1} is placed on the internal Doppler redshift component of motion in the Coma cluster".

Tifft suggested that this observation conflicted with standard cosmological scenarios. He states in summary:

"Throughout the development of the program it has seemed increasingly clear that the redshift has properties inconsistent with a simple velocity and/or cosmic scale change interpretation. Various implications have been pointed out from time to time, but basically the work is observationally driven."

== Early research - focused on galaxies rather than quasars ==
In 1971 from redshift quantization G. Paál came up with the idea that the Universe might have nontrivial topological structure.

Studies performed in the 1980s and early 1990s produced confirmatory results:

1. In 1989, Martin R. Croasdale reported finding a quantization of redshifts using a different sample of galaxies in increments of 72 km/s or Δz = 2.4×10^{−4} (where Δz denotes shift in frequency expressed as a proportion of initial frequency).
2. In 1990, Bruce Guthrie and William Napier reported finding a "possible periodicity" of the same magnitude for a slightly larger data set limited to bright spiral galaxies and excluding other types.
3. In 1992, Guthrie and Napier proposed the observation of a different periodicity in increments of Δz = 1.24×10^{−4} in a sample of 89 galaxies.
4. In 1992, Paal et al. and Holba et al. concluded that there was an unexplained periodicity of redshifts in a reanalysis of a large sample of galaxies.
5. In 1997, Guthrie and Napier concluded the same:

"So far the redshifts of over 250 galaxies with high-precision HI profiles have been used in the study. In consistently selected sub-samples of the datasets of sufficient precision examined so far, the redshift distribution has been found to be strongly quantized in the galactocentric frame of reference. ... The formal confidence levels associated with these results are extremely high."

== Quasar redshifts ==
Most recent discourse has focused upon whether redshift surveys of quasars (QSOs) produce evidence of quantization beyond that explainable by selection effect. This has been assisted by advances in cataloging in the late 1990s that have increased substantially the sample sizes involved in astronomical measurements.

=== Karlsson's formula ===
Historically, K. G. Karlsson and G. R. Burbidge were first to note that quasar redshifts were quantized in accordance with the empirical formula

$$\log_{10}(1 + z) = 0.089n - 0.0632$$

where:

- $z$ refers to the magnitude of redshift (shift in frequency as a proportion of initial frequency);
- $n$ is an integer with values 1, 2, 3, 4 ...

This predicts periodic redshift peaks at $z$ = 0.061, 0.30, 0.60, 0.96, 1.41, and 1.9, observed originally in a sample of 600 quasars, verified in later early studies.

=== Modern discourse ===
A 2001 study by Burbidge and Napier found the pattern of periodicity predicted by Karlsson's formula to be present at a high confidence level in three new samples of quasars, concluding that their findings are inexplicable by spectroscopic or similar selection effects.

In 2002, Hawkins et al. found no evidence for redshift quantization in a sample of 1647 galaxy-quasar pairs from the 2dF Galaxy Redshift Survey:

"Given that there are almost eight times as many data points in this sample as in the previous analysis by Burbidge & Napier (2001), we must conclude that the previous detection of a periodic signal arose from the combination of noise and the effects of the window function."

In response, Napier and Burbidge (2003) argue that the methods employed by Hawkins et al. to remove noise from their samples amount to "excessive data smoothing" which could hide a true periodicity. They publish an alternate methodology for this that preserves the periodicity observed in earlier studies.

In 2005, Tang and Zhang found no evidence for redshift quantization of quasars in samples from the Sloan Digital Sky Survey and 2dF redshift survey.

Arp et al. (2005) examined sample areas in the 2dF and SDSS surveys in detail, noting that quasar redshifts:

"... fit very closely the long standing Karlsson formula and strongly suggest the existence of preferred values in the distribution of quasar redshifts."

A 2006 study of 46,400 quasars in the SDSS by Bell and McDiarmid discovered 6 peaks in the redshift distribution consistent with the decreasing intrinsic redshift (DIR) model. However, Schneider et al. (2007) and Richards et al. (2006) reported that the periodicity reported by Bell and McDiarmid disappears after correcting for selection effects. Bell and Comeau (2010) concur that selection effects give rise to the apparent redshift peaks, but argue that the correction process removes a large fraction of the data. The authors argue that the "filter gap footprint" renders it impossible to verify or falsify the presence of a true redshift peak at Δz = 0.60.

A 2006 review by Bajan et al. discovered weak effects of redshift periodization in data from the Local Group of galaxies and the Hercules Supercluster. They conclude that "galaxy redshift periodization is an effect which can really exist", but that the evidence is not well established pending study of larger databases.

A 2007 absorption spectroscopic analysis of quasars by Ryabinkov et al. observed a pattern of statistically significant alternating peaks and dips in the redshift range Δz = 0.0 − 3.7, though they noted no statistical correlation between their findings and Karlsson's formula.
