= György Paál =

Hungarian astronomer and cosmologist

György Paál (Budapest, 1934 – Budapest, 1992) was a Hungarian astronomer and cosmologist.

== Work ==
In the late 1950s Paál studied the quasar and galaxy cluster distributions. In 1970 from redshift quantization he came up with the idea that the Universe might have nontrivial topological structure. These are the oldest papers that associate real observations with the possibility that our universe could have nontrivial topology.

== Membership ==
Cosmological Committee of IAU

== Awards ==
László Detre award.

== See also ==
- Accelerating universe
- Cosmological constant
- Dark energy
- Redshift quantization
- Universe
- Shape of the universe
