= Dorado Group =

Galaxy cluster in the constellation Dorado

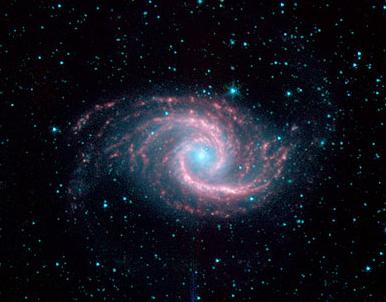
- NGC 1566, one of the brightest members of the Dorado Group (Spitzer Space Telescope image)

Observation data (Epoch J2000)
- Constellation: Dorado
- Right ascension: 04^{h} 17^{m} 03.9^{s}
- Declination: −56° 07′ 43″
- Brightest member: NGC 1566
- Number of galaxies: 46 plus 34 candidate members

Other designations
- Shk 18, G16, HG3, MC13, and NGC 1566 Group, LGG 112, LGG 114

The Dorado Group is a loose concentration of galaxies containing both spirals and ellipticals. It is generally considered a 'galaxy group' but may approach the size of a 'galaxy cluster'. It lies primarily in the southern constellation Dorado and is one of the richest galaxy groups of the Southern Hemisphere. Gérard de Vaucouleurs was the first to identify it in 1975 as a large complex nebulae II in the Dorado region, designating it as G16.

== Characteristics ==
A rough distance estimate from NGC 1549 (using the Hubble constant as 70) put the cluster at 18.4 megaparsecs (Mpc). The Cepheid distance estimate from Freedman et al. 2001 is 15.3 Mpc. Based upon the 2001 work of Tonry et al. the surface brightness fluctuation (SBF) of six member galaxies was averaged and adjusted to estimate the group's distance at 19.1±0.8 Mpc in 2007.

At the center of the cluster lie interacting galaxies NGC 1549 and NGC 1553. The dominant group members, ordered by luminosity, are: spiral NGC 1566, lenticular NGC 1553, and elliptical NGC 1549. The group spans an area of the sky 10° square, corresponding to an actual area of around 3 Mpc square. The group exhibits a relatively small harmonic mean radius (230 ± 40 kpc) due to the concentration at its core of more luminous galaxies. All together, the group has an overall luminosity of 7.8 ± 1.6 ×10^{10} L_{☉}.

The Dorado Group contains three dominant smaller groups within itself, NGC 1672 Group, NGC 1566 Group and the NGC 1433 Group, as evidenced by the H I distribution of the region. The Dorado Group is in the Fornax Wall that connects these three groups. Due to its location in the Fornax Wall, the group is at a similar distance as the Fornax Cluster. The Dorado Group is richer than the Local Group, while still being dominated by disk types of galaxies (i.e. its two brightest members are spiral NGC 1566 and lenticular NGC 1553) and its member galaxies have H I masses on par with non-interacting galaxies of the same morphological type. With the group's apparent crossing time being 12.6 ± 0.6 % of the universe's age, recent analyses deduce that the group is unvirialized, and thus this may explain the abundance of spirals and H I.

== Members ==
The table below lists eighteen galaxies that were identified in 1982 as associated with the Dorado Group by John Peter Huchra and Margaret J. Geller with the ones later dropped struck out. In 1989, the list of members was expanded to 46 by Maia, da Costa, & Latham. In 1990–1991, Henry C. Ferguson and Allan Sandage identified 34 other possible candidate members of the group with magnitudes greater than 19 and eliminated one member from Maia et al. putting the list at 79 galaxies. Kilborn et al. 2005 confirmed 26 members from the list. In 2006, the list was refined again by Firth et al. Using redshift data, they excluded eleven (as being background galaxies or interloper) from the Ferguson et al. list, confirmed the membership of twenty on the list, and left 48 unconfirmed.

Huchra et al. 1982 Members of the Dorado Group (with strikeouts for ones dropped by Maia et al. in 1989)
Name	Type	R.A. (J2000)	Dec. (J2000)	Redshift (km/s)	Apparent Magnitude
~~NGC 2082~~	SAB(rs+)c	05^{h} 41^{m} 51.1^{s}	−64° 18′ 04″	1184 ± 6	12.6
~~NGC 1947~~	S0^{−} pec	05^{h} 26^{m} 47.6^{s}	−63° 45′ 36″	1100 ± 24	11.7
~~NGC 1796~~	(R)SB(r)dm:	05^{h} 02^{m} 42.5^{s}	−61° 08′ 24″	1014 ± 9	12.9
~~NGC 1688~~	SB(rs)dm	04^{h} 48^{m} 23.8^{s}	−59° 48′ 01″	1228 ± 6	12.6
~~NGC 1672~~	(R'_1:)SB(r)bc Sy2	04^{h} 45^{m} 42.5^{s}	−59° 14′ 50″	1331 ± 3	10.3
IC 2056	SAB(r)b	04^{h} 16^{m} 24.5^{s}	−60° 12′ 25″	1133 ± 10	12.5
~~NGC 1559~~	SB(s)cd	04^{h} 17^{m} 35.8^{s}	−62° 47′ 01″	1304 ± 4	11.0
NGC 1543	(R)SB(l)0^{0}	04^{h} 12^{m} 43.2^{s}	−57° 44′ 17″	1176 ± 7	11.5
NGC 1574	SA0^{−}	04^{h} 21^{m} 58.8^{s}	−56° 58′ 29″	1050 ± 25	11.4
NGC 1533	(L)SB(rs)0^{0}	04^{h} 09^{m} 51.8^{s}	−56° 07′ 06″	790 ± 5	11.7
NGC 1546	SA0^{+?}	04^{h} 14^{m} 36.5^{s}	−56° 03′ 39″	1284 ± 14	11.8
NGC 1553	SA(rl)0^{0}	04^{h} 16^{m} 10.5^{s}	−55° 46′ 49″	1080 ± 11	10.3
NGC 1549	E0^{−1}	04^{h} 15^{m} 45.1^{s}	−55° 35′ 32″	1220 ± 15	10.7
NGC 1566	(R'_1)SAB(rs)bcSy1	04^{h} 20^{m} 00.4^{s}	−54° 56′ 16″	1504 ± 2	10.3
NGC 1617	(R')SAB(rs)a	04^{h} 31^{m} 39.5^{s}	−54° 36′ 08″	1063 ± 21	11.4
NGC 1515	SAB(s)bc	04^{h} 04^{m} 02.7^{s}	−54° 06′ 00″	1175 ± 7	12.1
NGC 1705	SA0^{−} pec	04^{h} 54^{m} 13.5^{s}	−53° 21′ 40″	633 ± 6	12.8
NGC 1596	SA0: sp	04^{h} 27^{m} 38.1^{s}	−55° 01′ 40″	1510 ± 8	12.1

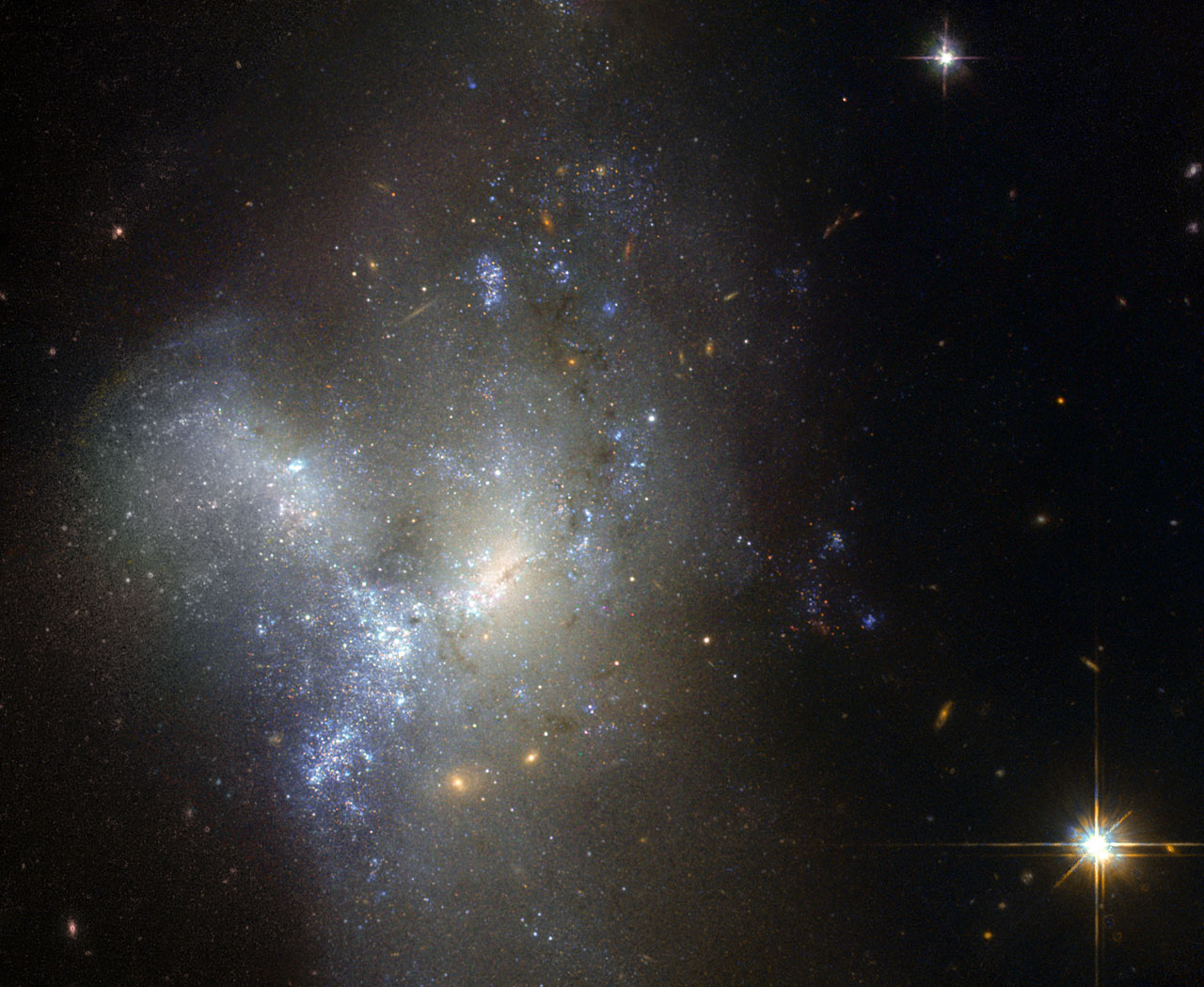
Peculiar galaxy NGC 1487 is located about 30 million light-years away in the constellation of Eridanus.

The Maia et al. 1989 thirty-four added members were: IC 2049, NGC 1536, IC 2058, IC 2032, NGC 1602, NGC 1581, IC 2085, NGC 1522, PGC 15149, NGC 1556, NGC 1527, NGC 1494, NGC 1493, PGC 14416, IC 2000, NGC 1483, NGC 1433, PGC 14078, NGC 1495, NGC 1510, NGC 1512, IC 1959, IC 1986, NGC 1448, NGC 1487, IC 1933, NGC 1311, IC 1954, IC 1914, NGC 1411, IC 1970, PGC 13818, NGC 1249, and PGC 11139. And the six dropped from the 1982 list were: NGC 2082, NGC 1947, NGC 1796, NGC 1688, NGC 1672, and NGC 1559. In 2007, a study of ultracompact dwarfs (UCD) identified one definite and two possible UCD members of the group. The thirty-four added by Ferguson et al. 1990 included IC 2038 and IC 2039.

A. M. Garcia identified Dorado Group into two groups, LGG 112 and LGG 114. LGG 112 contains 5 members, NGC 1543, NGC 1546, NGC 1549, NGC 1553 and NGC 1574. LGG 114 consists of 6 members and one possible, which are NGC 1536, NGC 1566, NGC 1581, NGC 1596, NGC 1602, IC 2058 and ESO 157-30 as the possible member.

The NGC 1566 Group of Dorado contains H I with M_{HI} = 3.5×10^{10} M_{☉} of which 40% alone comes from the NGC 1566 galaxy. More than half of its members are outside its virial radius of 580 kpc which suggests this group is a young non-virialized group. The 2005 Kilborn et al. set of confirmed NGC 1566 Group members (within the Dorado Group) is:

Kilborn et al. 2005 Members of the NGC 1566 Group
Name	Type	R.A. (J2000)	Dec. (J2000)	Redshift (km/s)	Apparent Magnitude
IC 2049	SAB(s)d?	04^{h} 12^{m} 04.3^{s}	−58° 33′ 25″	1469 ± 7	14.5
NGC 1536	SB(s)c pec	04^{h} 10^{m} 59.8^{s}	−56° 28′ 50″	1217 ± 13	13.2
NGC 1543	(R)SB(l)0^{0}	04^{h} 12^{m} 43.2^{s}	−57° 44′ 17″	1176 ± 7	11.5
LSBG F157-081	Irregular	04^{h} 27^{m} 13.7^{s}	−57° 25′ 42″	1215 ± 7	16.7
NGC 1533	(L)SB(rs)0^{0}	04^{h} 09^{m} 51.8^{s}	−56° 07′ 06″	790 ± 5	11.7
IC 2038	Sd pec	04^{h} 08^{m} 53.7^{s}	−55° 59′ 22″	712 ± 52	15.5
APMBGC 157+016+068	Irregular	04^{h} 22^{m} 51.7^{s}	−56° 13′ 39″	1350 ± 4	16.3
NGC 1546	SA0^{+?}	04^{h} 14^{m} 36.5^{s}	−56° 03′ 39″	1284 ± 14	11.8
IC 2058	Sc	04^{h} 17^{m} 54.3^{s}	−55° 55′ 58″	1379 ± 1	13.9
IC 2032	IAB(s)m pec	04^{h} 07^{m} 03.0^{s}	−55° 19′ 26″	1068 ± 7	14.7
NGC 1566	(R'_1)SAB(rs)bcSy1	04^{h} 20^{m} 00.4^{s}	−54° 56′ 16″	1504 ± 2	10.3
NGC 1596	SA0: sp	04^{h} 27^{m} 38.1^{s}	−55° 01′ 40″	1510 ± 8	12.1
NGC 1602	IB(s)m pec	04^{h} 27^{m} 55.0^{s}	−55° 03′ 28″	1568 ± 8	13.3
NGC 1515	SAB(s)bc	04^{h} 04^{m} 02.7^{s}	−54° 06′ 00″	1175 ± 7	12.1
NGC 1522	(R')S0^{0}: pec	04^{h} 06^{m} 07.9^{s}	−52° 40′ 06″	898 ± 7	13.9
ESO 118-019	S0^{0} pec	04^{h} 18^{m} 59.5^{s}	−58° 15′ 27″	1239	14.9
ESO 157-030	E4	04^{h} 27^{m} 32.6^{s}	−54° 11′ 48″	1471 ± 28	14.7
ESO 157-047	S0/a? pec sp	04^{h} 39^{m} 19.1^{s}	−54° 12′ 41″	1655 ± 10	15.5
ESO 157-049	S?	04^{h} 39^{m} 36.9^{s}	−53° 00′ 46″	1678 ± 5	14.3
IC 2085	S0^{0} pec sp	04^{h} 31^{m} 24.2^{s}	−54° 25′ 01″	982 ± 10	13.9
NGC 1549	E0^{−1}	04^{h} 15^{m} 45.1^{s}	−55° 35′ 32″	1220 ± 15	10.7
NGC 1553	SA(rl)0^{0}	04^{h} 16^{m} 10.5^{s}	−55° 46′ 49″	1080 ± 11	10.3
NGC 1574	SA0^{−}	04^{h} 21^{m} 58.8^{s}	−56° 58′ 29″	1050 ± 25	11.4
NGC 1581	S0^{−}	04^{h} 24^{m} 44.9^{s}	−54° 56′ 31″	1600 ± 27	13.6
NGC 1617	(R')SAB(rs)a	04^{h} 31^{m} 39.5^{s}	−54° 36′ 08″	1063 ± 21	11.4
Abell 3202	Irregular	04^{h} 01^{m} 15.2^{s}	−53° 29′ 23″	1135 ± 40	16.9
