= NGC 1543 =

Galaxy in the constellation Reticulum

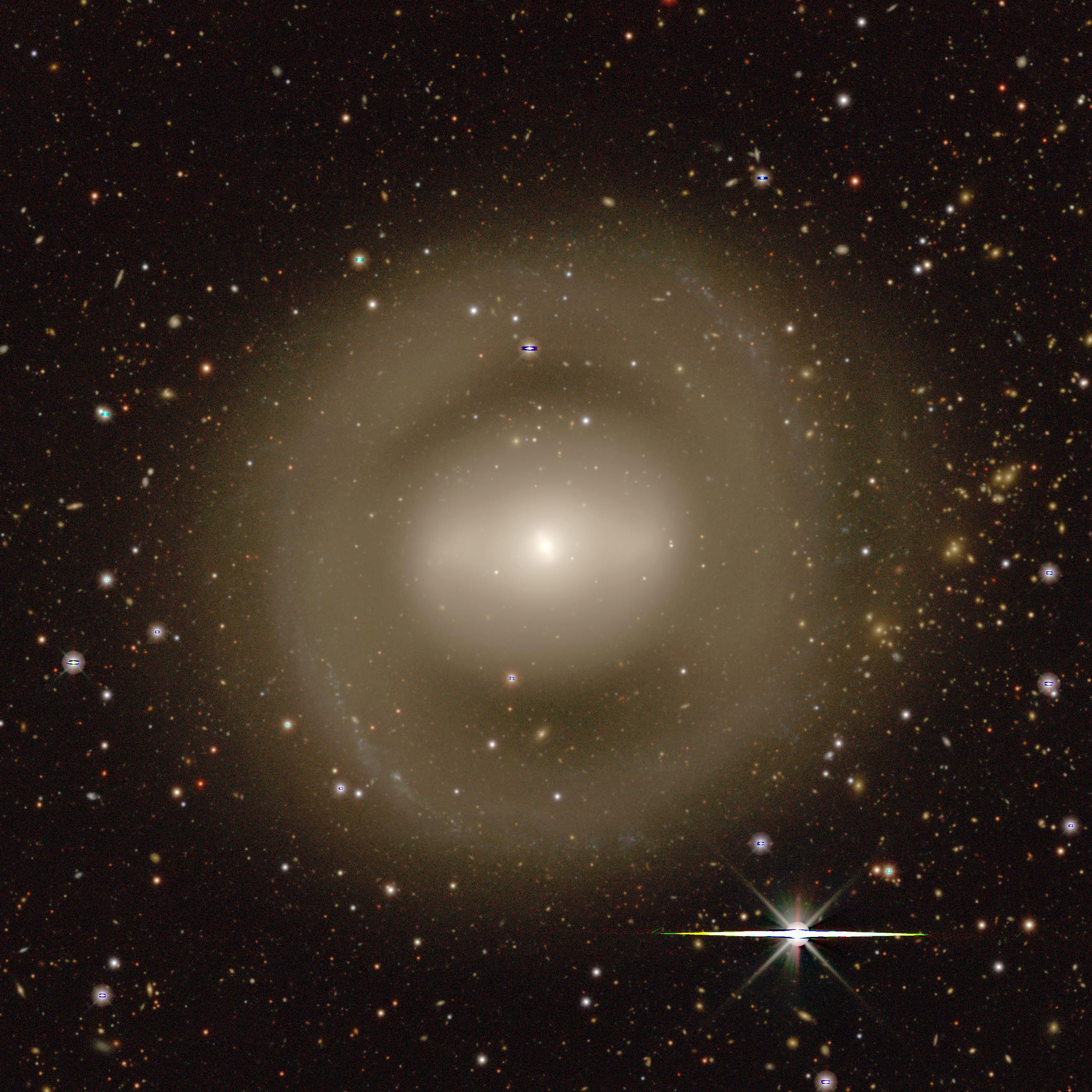
- NGC 1543 by the Legacy Survey DR10

Observation data (J2000 epoch)
- Constellation: Reticulum
- Right ascension: 04^{h} 12^{m} 43.2^{s}
- Declination: −57° 44′ 16″
- Redshift: 0.003922 ± 0.000024
- Heliocentric radial velocity: 1,176 ± 7 km/s
- Distance: 55.7 ± 12.6 Mly (17.1 ± 3.9 Mpc)
- Group or cluster: Dorado Group
- Apparent magnitude (V): 10.3

Characteristics
- Type: (R)SB(l)0^0
- Apparent size (V): 4.9′ × 2.8′

Other designations
- ESO 118-10, AM 0411-575, IRAS04117-5751, PGC 14659

NGC 1543 is a barred lenticular galaxy in the constellation Reticulum. The galaxy lies about 55 million light years away from Earth, which means, given its apparent dimensions, that NGC 1543 is approximately 100,000 light years across. It was discovered by James Dunlop on November 5, 1826. It is a member of the Dorado Group.

== Characteristics ==
The galaxy is seen nearly face on. NGC 1543 features a double bar. The inner bar has a length of 23 arcseconds, with its major axis at 30° northeast angle, while the main bar is about 2.3 arcminutes and lies along an east-west axis. There is H-alpha emission from the centre of the galaxy. The nucleus appears to have undergone a star formation event 2 to 5 billion years ago. However the stars in the bulge and the disk are old.

Another prominent feature of the galaxy is the outer ring, which is more visible in the near ultraviolet than optical wavelengths. Its radius is estimated to be 160 arcseconds. The ring was also detected in the hydrogen line, while the rest of the galaxy appears devoid of hydrogen. The total hydrogen mass of the galaxy is estimated to be (9±0.9)×10^{8} M_{☉}. The ring could have formed by the galaxy colliding with a dwarf galaxy while passing through the central region of the galaxy group. HII regions in the southeastern part of the ring emit ultraviolet and H-alpha, indicating active star formation. Star formation is also observed at the northwest part of the ring. The star formation rate at the ring is estimated to be about 0.08 solar masses per year based on the ultraviolet radiation detected and this rate was constant the last hundred million years.

== Nearby galaxies ==
NGC 1543 is a member of the Dorado Group. The galaxy lies at the outskirts of the group, about 1.2 kiloparsecs from the center of the group, where NGC 1553 is located, and is relatively isolated. No extended hydrogen emission was found, indicating the galaxy isn't currently interacting.
