= NGC 1546 =

Galaxy in the constellation Dorado

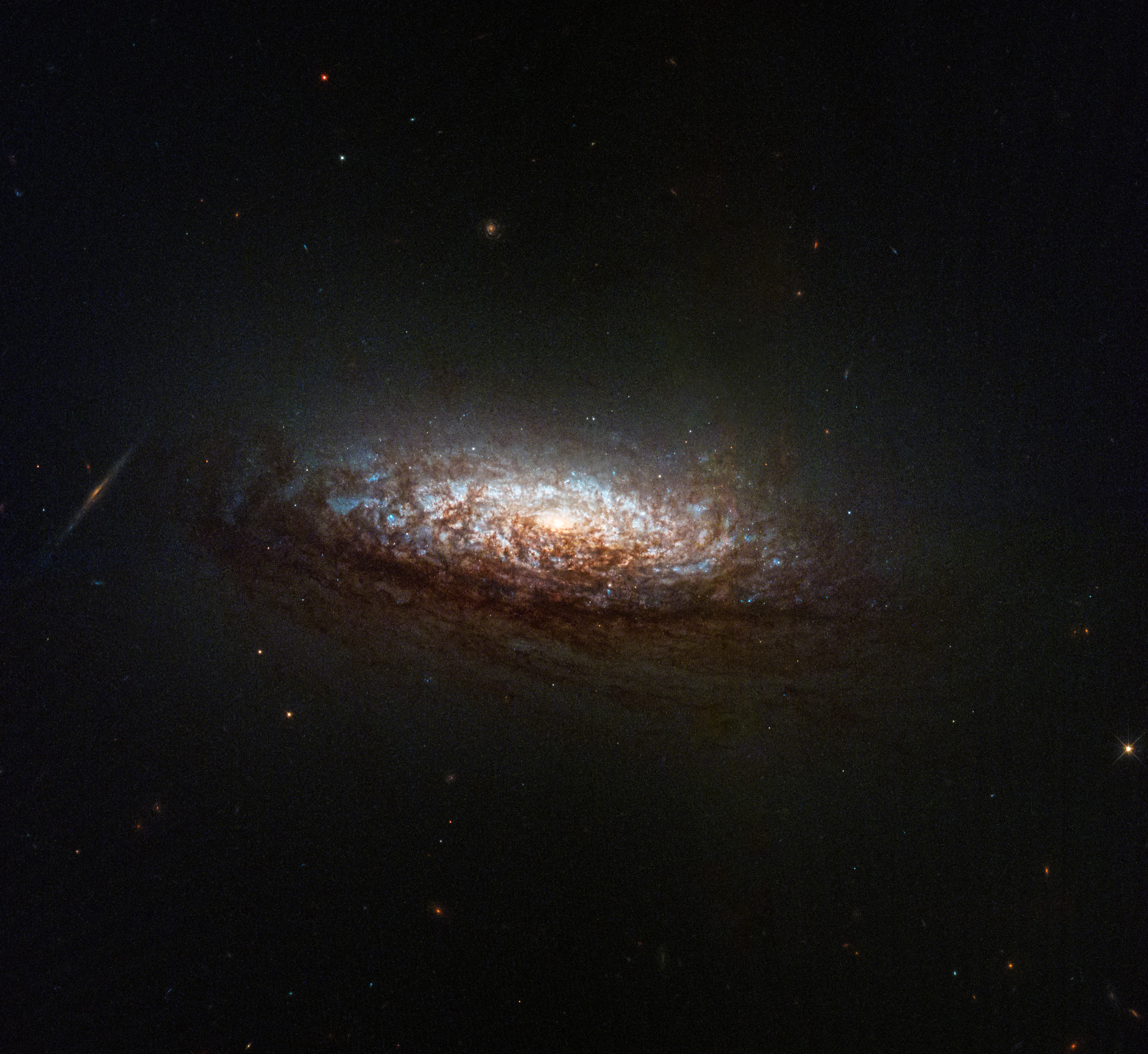
- NGC 1546 by the Hubble Space Telescope

Observation data (J2000 epoch)
- Constellation: Dorado
- Right ascension: 04^{h} 14^{m} 36.4^{s}
- Declination: −56° 03′ 40″
- Redshift: 0.004284 ± 0.000047
- Heliocentric radial velocity: 1,284 ± 14 km/s
- Distance: 51.8 ± 15.5 Mly (15.9 ± 4.8 Mpc)
- Group or cluster: Dorado Group
- Apparent magnitude (V): 11.0

Characteristics
- Type: SA0+?
- Apparent size (V): 3.0′ × 1.7′

Other designations
- ESO 157-12, AM 0413-561, IRAS04134-5611, PGC 14723

NGC 1546 is a lenticular galaxy in the constellation Dorado. The galaxy lies about 55 million light years away from Earth, which means, given its apparent dimensions, that NGC 1546 is approximately 60,000 light years across. It was discovered by John Herschel on December 5, 1834. It is a member of the Dorado Group.

== Characteristics ==
The galaxy is seen nearly edge-on, with an inclination of 70°. The galaxy has a high surface brightness spiral arm pattern. The multiple spiral arms are in a pattern that is similar to that of an Sc spiral galaxy. In older images that disk appeared to have no structure, leading the galaxy to be categorised as a lenticular galaxy. The H-alpha and [N II] emission is distributed in a flocculent pattern. The galaxy features an inner ring, with a radius of 26 arcseconds, and an outer pseudoring 0.96 arcminutes across, which have both been detected in infrared and far ultraviolet. There are H II regions at both rings. The total star formation rate of the galaxy is estimated to be 0.83 M_{☉} per year.

A series of dust lanes, some of which are backlit by the galaxy's core. This dust absorbs light from the core, reddening it and making the dust appear rusty-brown. The core itself glows brightly in a yellowish light indicating an older population of stars. Brilliant-blue regions of active star formation sparkle through the dust. The galaxy doesn't show evidence of an outflow from the nucleus. It has diffuse far ultraviolet emission from the outer regions of the galaxy and a diffuse halo. A faint shell is visible south-east of the galaxy.

== Nearby galaxies ==
The galaxy is located in the central part of the Dorado Group, forming a compact group along with NGC 1549, NGC 1553, and IC 2058.
