= NGC 1566 =

Galaxy in the constellation Dorado

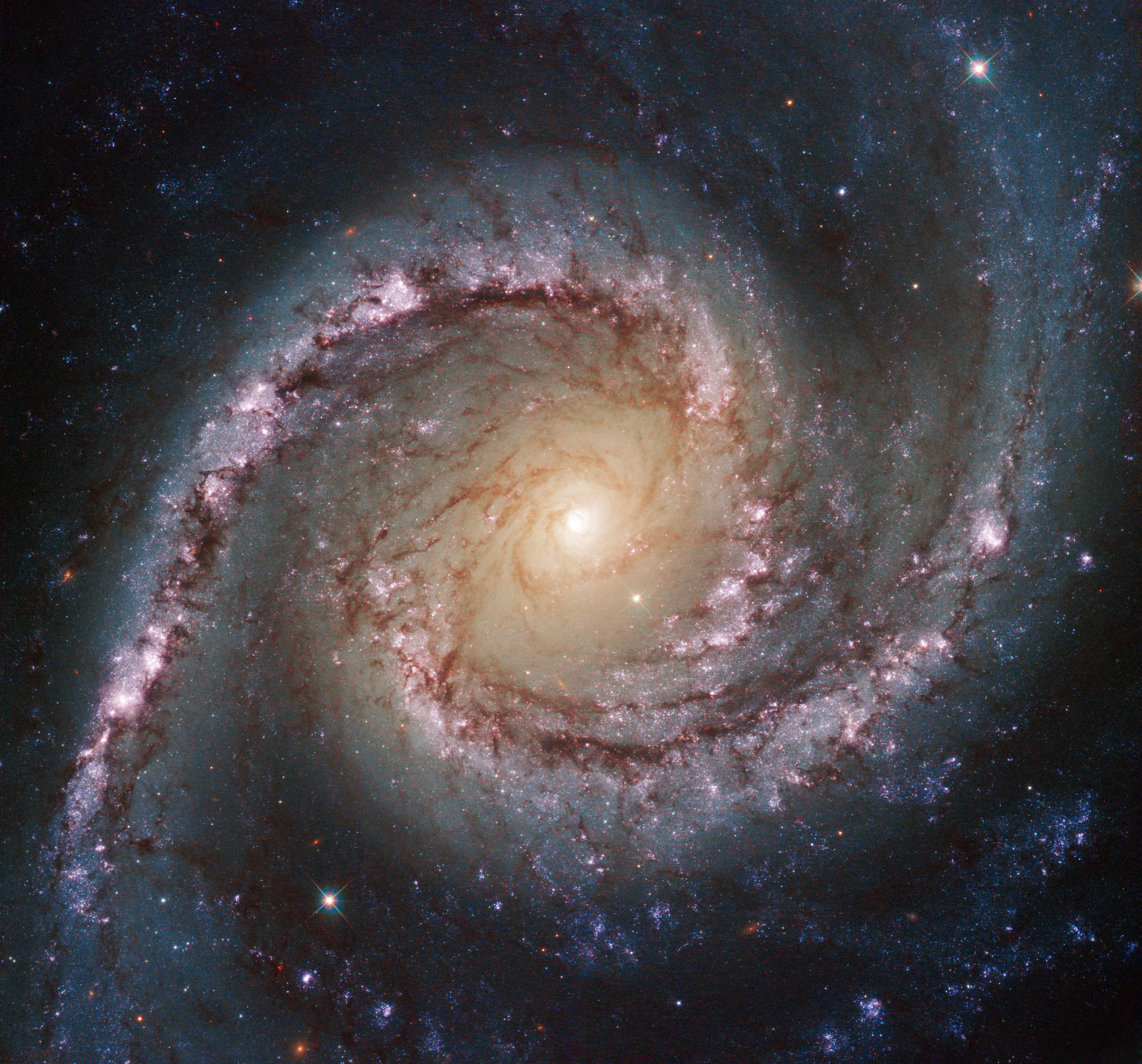
- A close-up image of NGC 1566 taken by the Hubble’s Wide Field Camera 3.

Observation data (J2000 epoch)
- Constellation: Dorado
- Right ascension: 04^{h} 20^{m} 00.40200^{s}
- Declination: −54° 56′ 16.5781″
- Redshift: 0.005017
- Heliocentric radial velocity: 1,506.1 km/s
- Distance: 69 Mly (21.3 Mpc)
- Apparent magnitude (V): 9.73±0.03

Characteristics
- Type: SAB(rs)bc
- Mass: 6.5×10^{10} M_{☉}
- Size: 118,175 ly (36.25 kpc) (estimated)
- Apparent size (V): 8′.51 × 5′.37

Other designations
- PGC 14897

NGC 1566, sometimes known as the Spanish Dancer, is an intermediate spiral galaxy located around 69 million light years away in the constellation of Dorado. The exact distance of this galaxy remains elusive with measurements ranging from 6 Mpc up to 21 Mpc.

It was discovered on May 28, 1826 by Scottish astronomer James Dunlop. At 10th magnitude, it requires a telescope to view.

== Neighborhood ==
This galaxy forms a member of the NGC 1566 subgroup of the Dorado Group, of which it is dominant and brightest member, although Kilborn and colleagues (2005) listed it as second brightest member of the NGC 1566 group after NGC 1553. The X-ray emission from the group is dominated by the hot gas halo of this galaxy, which extends out to 29 kpc before merging with the background radiation. The galaxy appears to be interacting with smaller members of its subgroup. Radio emissions suggest the disk is asymmetrical and the neutral hydrogen gas shows a mild warp.

== Characteristics ==
The morphological classification of NGC 1566 is SAB(rs)bc, which indicates a spiral galaxy with a weak bar structure around the nucleus (SAB), an incomplete ring around the bar (rs), and showing wound arms (bc). The spiral arms are strong and symmetrical. The galactic plane is inclined at an angle of 31°±7° to the line of sight to the Earth and the long axis is oriented along a position angle of 219°±4°. The northwest side of the galaxy is more strongly obscured by dust, suggesting it is the near side. The mass ratio of neutral hydrogen gas to the mass of the stars is 0.29, which is on the high side for a galaxy of this mass. Absolute luminosity is 3.7×10^{10} L_{☉}, and is calculated to contain 1.4×10^{10} M_{☉} of H I.

NGC 1566 is an active galaxy with many features of a Seyfert type I, although the exact type remains uncertain. It is one of the closest and brightest Seyfert galaxies. The mass of the supermassive black hole at the center is estimated at (1.3±0.6)×10^{7} M_{☉}. The proximity of the galaxy, along with strong spiral arms and an active nucleus, have made it the subject of much scientific study in the astronomy community. It is the nearest known CL AGN galaxy.

== Supernovae ==
Three supernovae have been observed in NGC 1566:

- SN 2010el (Type Iax, mag. 16.8) was discovered by Berto Monard of South Africa on 19 June 2010. It was located 13″ west and 22″ south of the center of the galaxy.
- ASASSN-14ha (Type II, mag. 14.6) was discovered by All Sky Automated Survey for SuperNovae (ASAS-SN) on 10 September 2014.
- SN 2021aefx (Type Ia, mag 17.24) was discovered by the Distance Less Than 40 Mpc Survey (DLT40) on 11 November 2021. It reached magnitude 12, making it the brightest supernova of 2021.

== Gallery ==
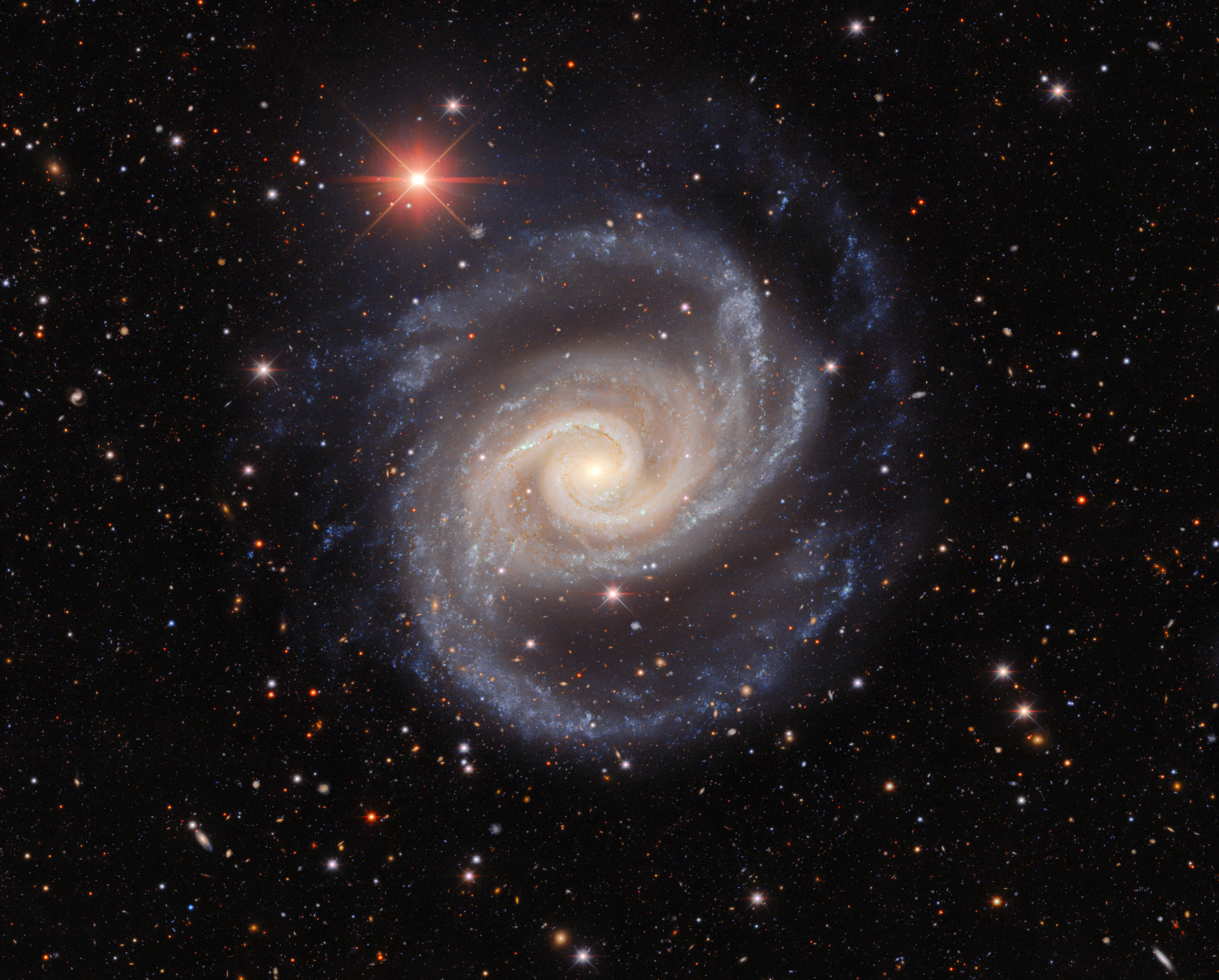
Spanish Dancer Galaxy Twirls into View from NSF’s NOIRLab in Chile

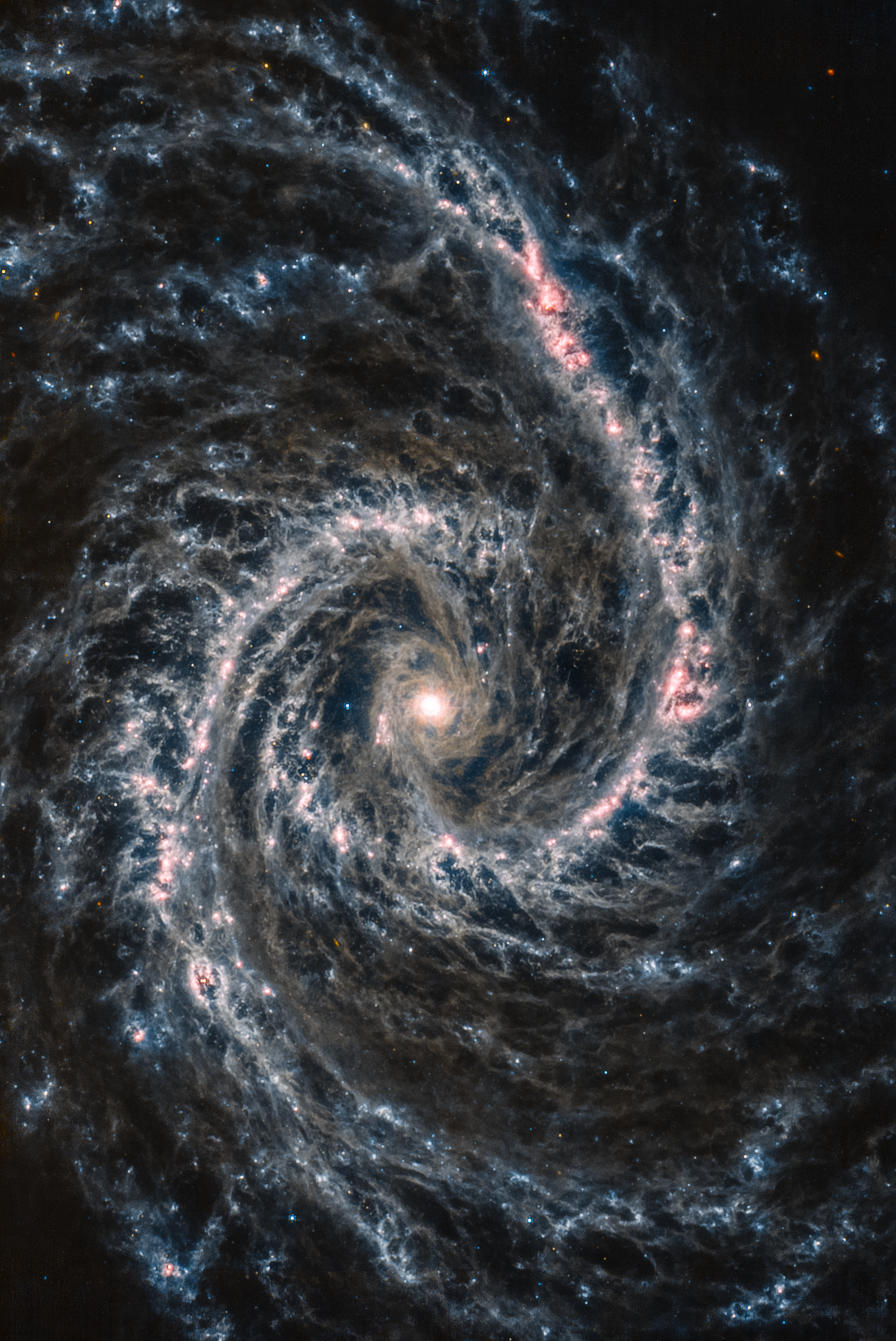
Image of NGC 1566 taken by James Webb's Mid-Infrared Instrument

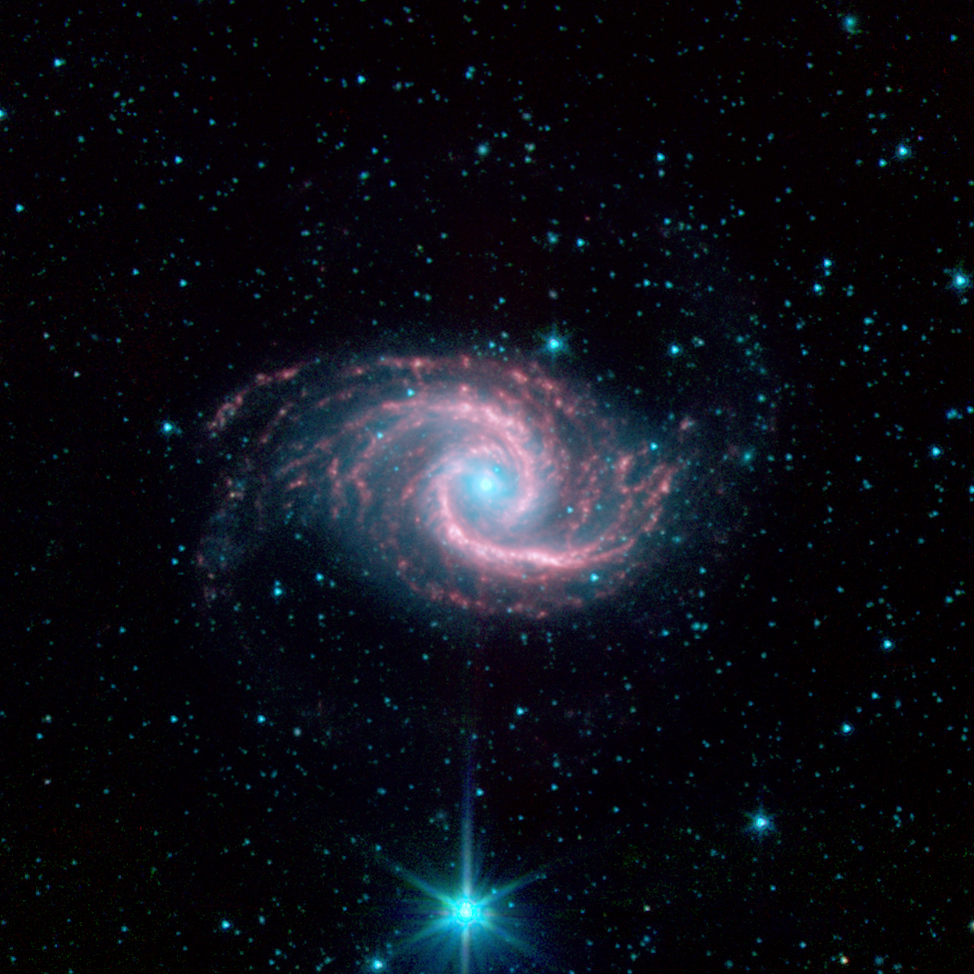
Infrared Image of NGC 1566 taken by the Spitzer Space Telescope
