= NGC 1892 =

Spiral galaxy in the constellation Dorado

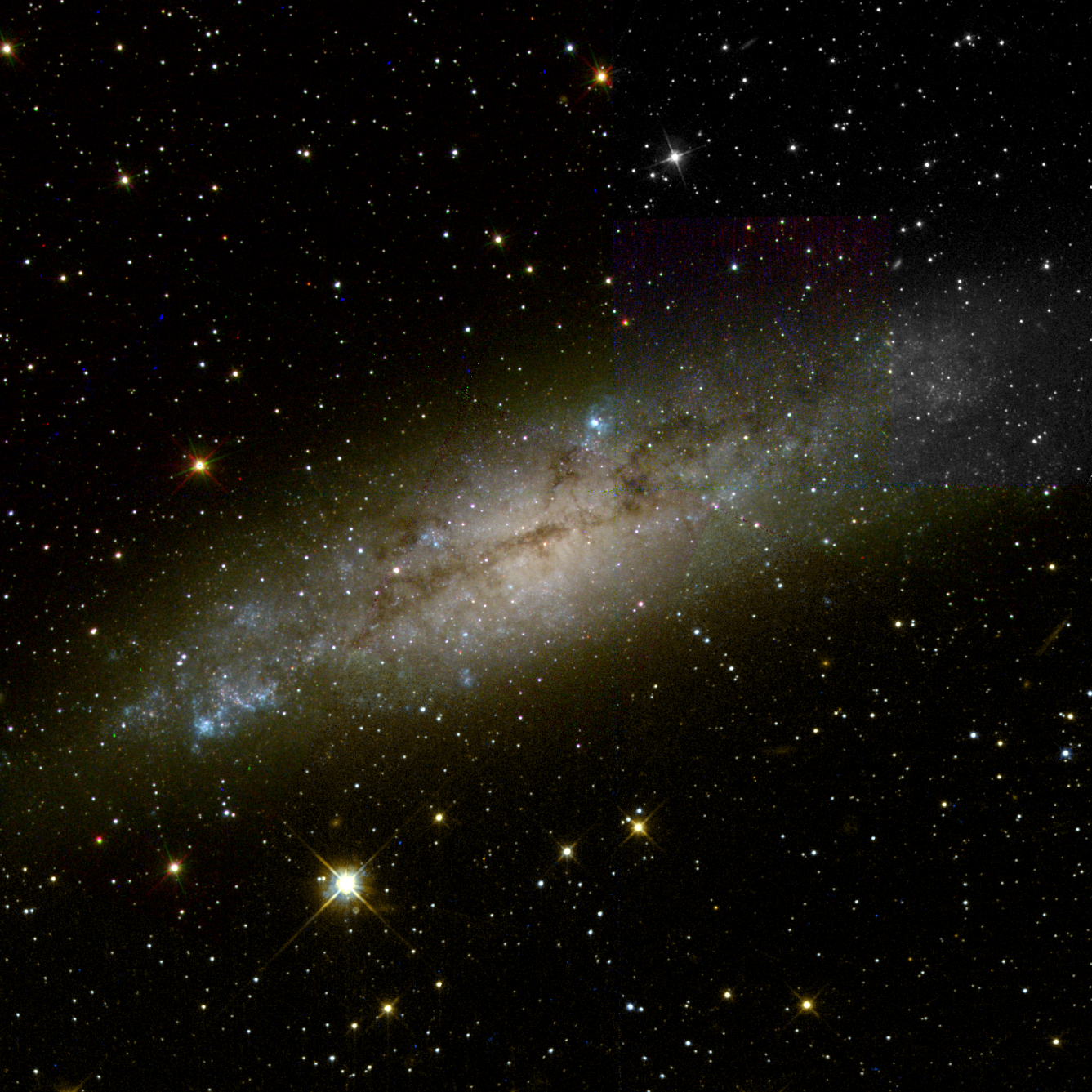
- NGC 1892 imaged by the Hubble Space Telescope

Observation data (2000.0 epoch)
- Constellation: Dorado
- Right ascension: 05^{h} 17^{m} 9.0^{s}
- Declination: −64° 57′ 35″
- Redshift: 0.004546
- Heliocentric radial velocity: 1363 km/s
- Distance: 51 Mly (15.5 Mpc)
- Apparent magnitude (V): 12.83
- Absolute magnitude (B): −16.4

Characteristics
- Type: Scd
- Mass: 4×10^{9} (Stellar mass) M_{☉}
- Size: ~63,200 ly (19.37 kpc) (estimated)
- Apparent size (V): 2.9' × 0.8'

Other designations
- MCG+03-01-030, 2MFGC 4320, 2MASX J05170905-6457354, IRAS 05169-6500, PGC 17042

NGC 1892 is a spiral galaxy located approximately 51 million light-years away the constellation Dorado. It was discovered November 30, 1834 by John Herschel. NGC 1892 is a member of the NGC 1947 Group which is part of the Southern Supercluster.

NGC 1892, despite being a spiral galaxy, has a central bulge which is morphologically more similar to dwarf irregular galaxies. The galaxy's central bulge which is highly irregular, is obscured by a dust lane. NGC 1892 is also host to a nuclear star cluster with an estimated mass of 7.381 million M_{☉}, and a supermassive black hole with an estimated mass 4.7 million M_{☉}.

A probable supernova of type IIP was photographed by the Carnegie-Irvine Galaxy Survey (CGS) in 2004, but it was not noticed until Brazilian amateur astronomer Jorge Stockler de Moraes compared the CGS image to one he took in January 2017.

== See also ==
- List of NGC objects (1001–2000)
- NGC 1947
