= IC 1954 =

Galaxy in the constellation Horologium

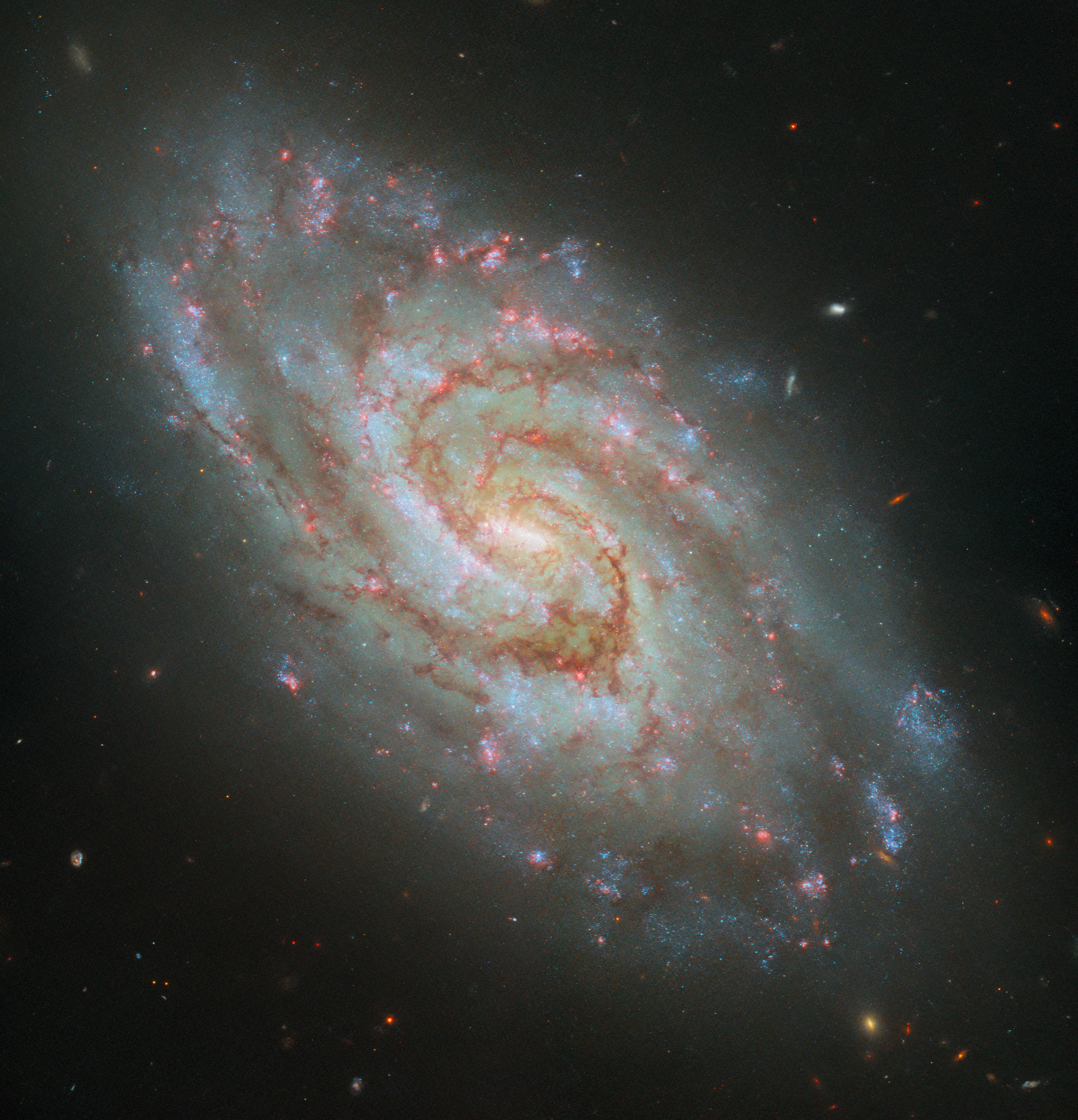
- IC 1954 imaged by the Hubble Space Telescope

Observation data (J2000 epoch)
- Constellation: Horologium
- Right ascension: 03^{h} 31^{m} 31.2844^{s}
- Declination: −51° 54′ 17.100″
- Redshift: 0.003542 ± 0.000007
- Heliocentric radial velocity: 1,062 ± 2 km/s
- Distance: 47.4 ± 7.4 Mly (14.5 ± 2.3 Mpc)
- Group or cluster: IC 1954 group (LGG 93)
- Apparent magnitude (V): 11.4

Characteristics
- Type: SA(s)c
- Size: ~44,100 ly (13.51 kpc) (estimated)
- Apparent size (V): 3.2′ × 1.5′

Other designations
- ESO 200- G 036, IRAS 03300-5204, PGC 13090

IC 1954 is a spiral galaxy in the constellation Horologium. The galaxy lies about 45 million light years away from Earth, which means, given its apparent dimensions, that IC 1954 is approximately 45,000 light years across. It was discovered independently by Robert T. A. Innes in 1898 and DeLisle Stewart and October 14, 1898.

The galaxy has two large, curling arms that extend from the centre and wrap around. The arms are followed by thick strands of dark reddish dust. The arms and rest of the galaxy’s disc are speckled with glowing patches; some are blue in colour, others are pink. The pink spots are star forming regions emitting H-alpha light. There are also many star clusters. In the center of the galaxy lies a bar, which could be a region of intense star formation. The bar is short, 6 arcseconds long, and with several knots. A large cluster or OB association is visible at its western end. Hydrogen line mapping shows a central compact disk with bright emission with a radius of 5 kpc surrounded by fainter emission. The total star formation rate of the galaxy is estimated to be 0.36 M_{☉} per year. The galaxy is seen at an angle of 57°.

IC 1954 is a member of the IC 1954 group, also known as LGG 93. Other members of the group include IC 1933, IC 1959, NGC 1249, and NGC 1311. It belongs in the same galaxy cloud as the Dorado Group.
