= NGC 1617 =

Galaxy in the constellation Dorado

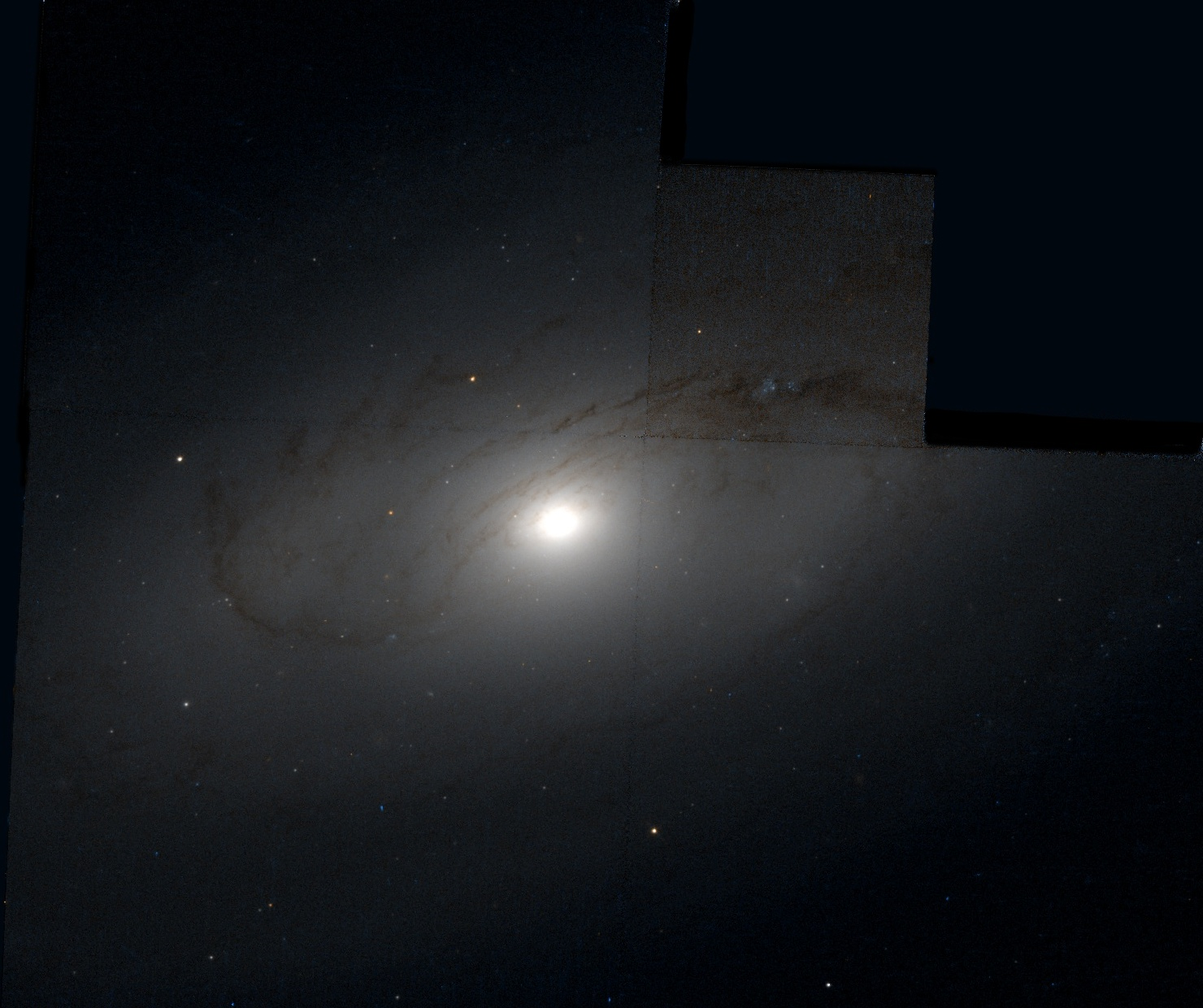
- NGC 1617 by the Hubble Space Telescope

Observation data (J2000 epoch)
- Constellation: Dorado
- Right ascension: 04^{h} 31^{m} 39.4^{s}
- Declination: −54° 36′ 07″
- Redshift: 0.003566 ± 0.000063
- Heliocentric radial velocity: 1,069 ± 19 km/s
- Distance: 42.4 ± 2.9 Mly (13 ± 0.9 Mpc)
- Group or cluster: Dorado Group
- Apparent magnitude (V): 10.5

Characteristics
- Type: (R')SAB(rs)a
- Apparent size (V): 4.3′ × 2.1′

Other designations
- ESO 157- G 041, AM 0430-544, IRAS 04305-5442, PGC 15405

NGC 1617 is a spiral galaxy in the constellation Dorado. The galaxy lies about 45 million light years away from Earth, which means, given its apparent dimensions, that NGC 1617 is approximately 70,000 light years across. It was discovered by James Dunlop on November 5, 1826. It is a member of the Dorado Group.

NGC 1617 has an elliptical bulge with a bright nuclear source. The bulge is smooth, with the exception of some off-centre dust lanes. The galaxy has a weak bar and a very smooth disk, with no evidence of star formation knots. The disk is slightly asymmetric, extending a bit more towards the south. An outer ring forms the edges of the disk. The arms are tightly wound, forming a ring after half a revolution. Two dust knots are visible in submillimeter emission along the major axis of the galaxy.

NGC 1617 lies 35 arcminutes north of Alpha Doradus. IC 2085 lies 11 arcminutes north of NGC 1617.
