= NGC 1515 =

Galaxy in the constellation Dorado

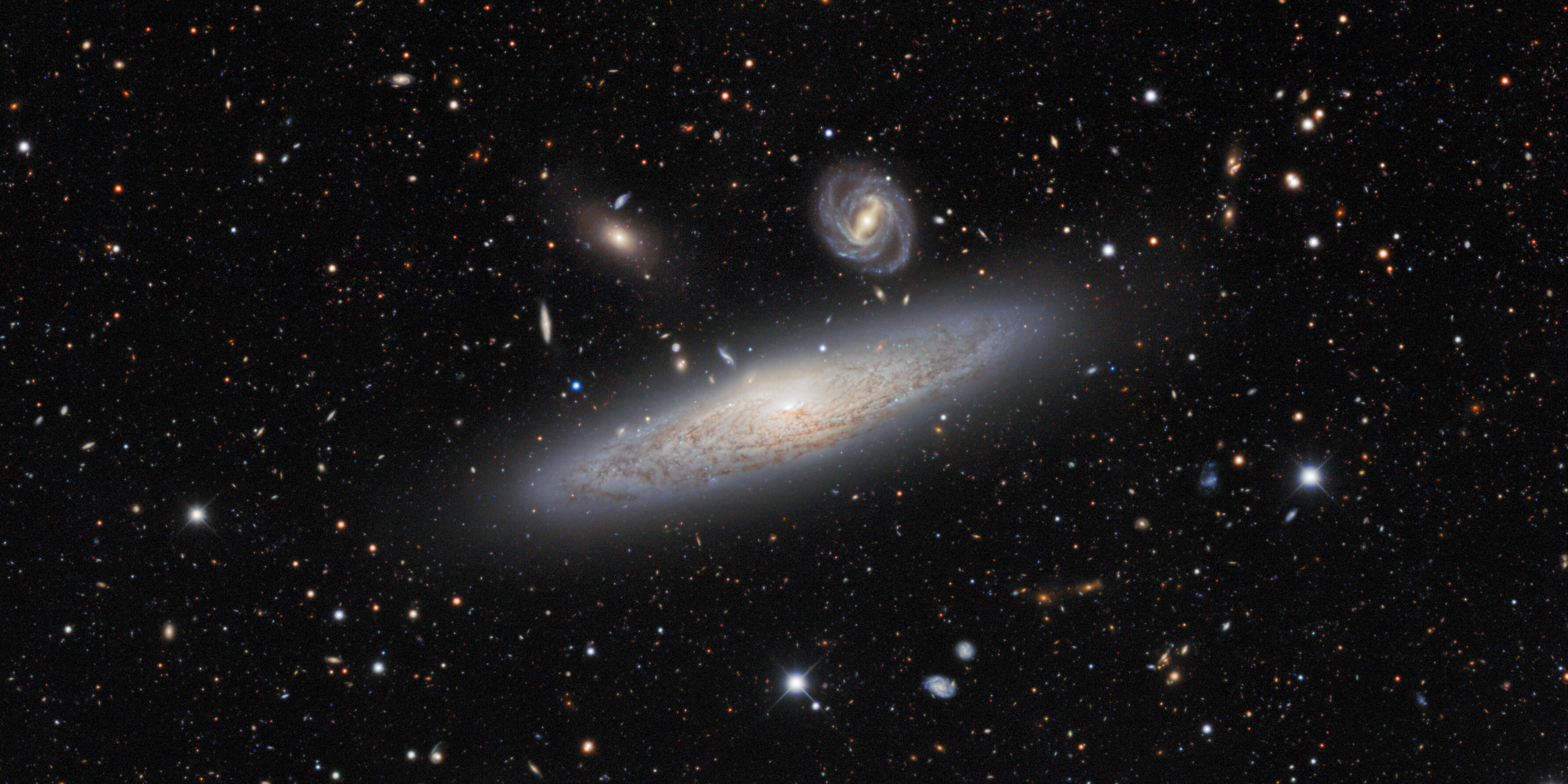
- NGC 1515 by the Víctor M. Blanco Telescope at Cerro Tololo Inter-American Observatory

Observation data (J2000 epoch)
- Constellation: Dorado
- Right ascension: 04^{h} 04^{m} 02.7^{s}
- Declination: −54° 06′ 01″
- Redshift: 0.003920 ± 0.000023
- Heliocentric radial velocity: 1,175 ± 7 km/s
- Distance: 56.7 ± 6.9 Mly (17.4 ± 2.1 Mpc)
- Group or cluster: Dorado Group
- Apparent magnitude (V): 11.3

Characteristics
- Type: SAB(s)bc
- Apparent size (V): 5.2′ × 1.1′

Other designations
- ESO 156- G 036, AM 0402-541, IRAS 04028-5414, PGC 14397

NGC 1515 is a spiral galaxy in the constellation Dorado. The galaxy lies about 55 million light years away from Earth, which means, given its apparent dimensions, that NGC 1515 is approximately 100,000 light years across. It was discovered by James Dunlop on November 5, 1826. It is a member of the Dorado Group.

== Characteristics ==
NGC 1515 is seen highly inclined. It has multiple spiral arms with fragments of dust lanes. The galactic nucleus is small, while the bulge seems to extend over the galactic plane. It is X-shaped (this shape is also referred to as peanut or box-shaped). There is evidence of a bar. Some HII regions are visible in the arms.

The galaxy appears deficient in hydrogen. The total hydrogen mass is estimated to be 5.2×10^{8} M_{☉}, about ten times less than predicted. The hydrogen radius of the galaxy is 70% less than the optical one and there is no significant diffuse hydrogen emission around the galaxy. The galaxy probably lost most of its hydrogen as it passed through the centre of its galaxy group.

In the centre of the galaxy is predicted to lie a supermassive black hole whose mass is estimated to be between 3.2 and 17 million solar masses, based on the spiral arm pitch angle.

== Nearby galaxies ==
NGC 1515 is a member of the Dorado Group, which consists of at least 46 members, and is part of the NGC 1566 subgroup. NGC 1515 is relatively isolated from the other members. A dwarf galaxy is located within 200 kiloparsecs. NGC 1515A lies 2 arcminutes away from the galaxy, however its redshift is about ten times higher and the pairing is just visual.
