= NGC 2082 =

Spiral galaxy in the constellation Dorado

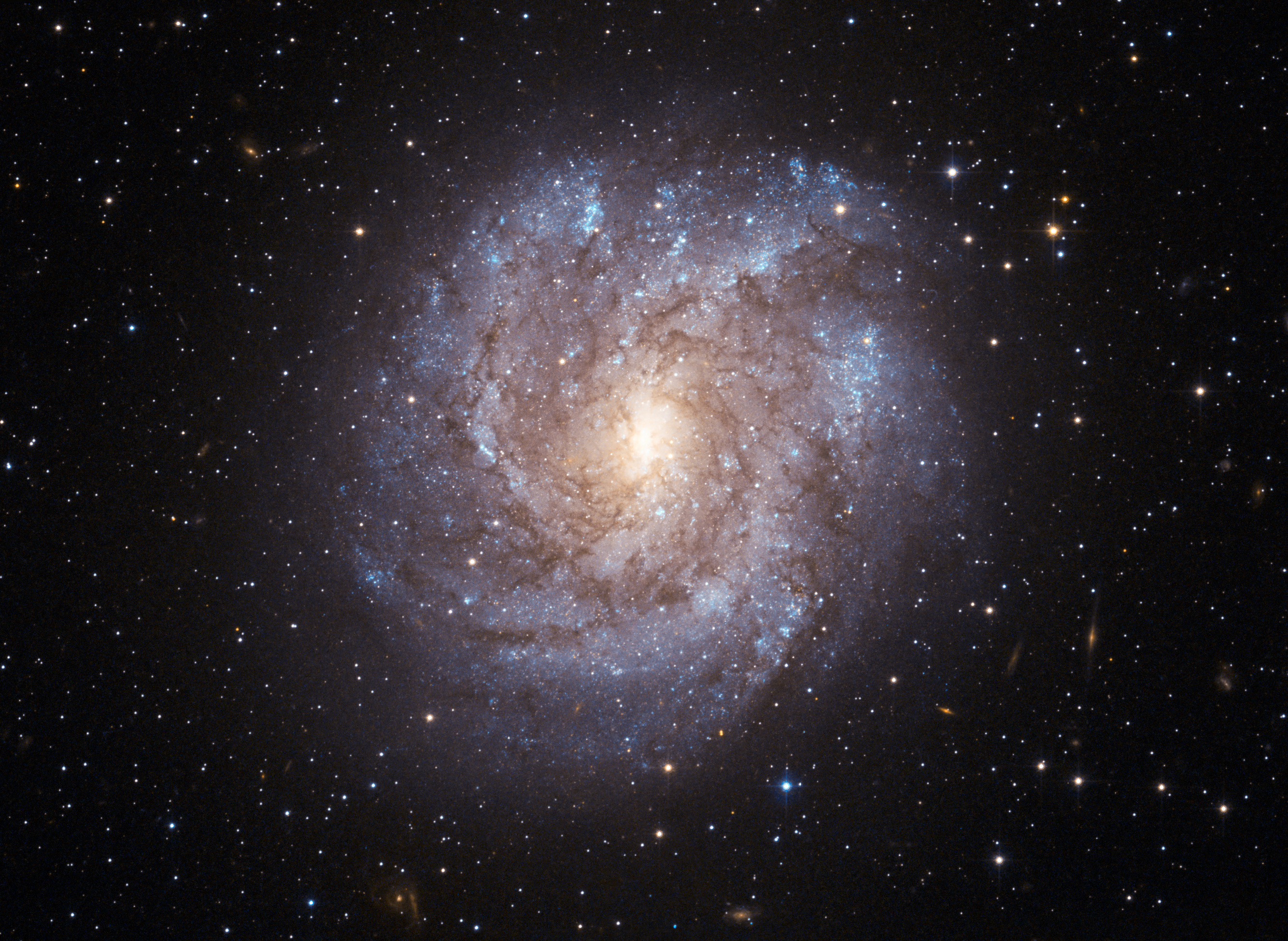
- NGC 2082 imaged by the Hubble Space Telescope

Observation data (2000.0 epoch)
- Constellation: Dorado
- Right ascension: 05^{h} 41^{m} 51.3141^{s}
- Declination: −64° 18′ 04.37″
- Redshift: 0.003950
- Heliocentric radial velocity: 1184 km/s
- Distance: 60 Mly (18.5 Mpc)
- Apparent magnitude (V): 12.62

Characteristics
- Type: SB(r)b
- Mass: 8×10^{9} (Stellar mass) M_{☉}
- Size: ~33,100 ly (10.16 kpc) (estimated)
- Apparent size (V): 1.8 × 1.7

Other designations
- ESO 086- G 021, IRAS 05415-6419, PGC 17609

NGC 2082 is a barred spiral galaxy located approximately 60 million light-years away the constellation Dorado. It was discovered November 30, 1834 by John Herschel. The galaxy was originally considered to be part of the Dorado Group of galaxies, but was later removed from the list. NGC 2082 is now considered a member of the nearby NGC 1947 Group which is part of the Southern Supercluster.

NGC 2082 is host to an irregular bulge that is host to many star forming regions that are interspersed with dust. It is thought that the star formation occurring in the center of the galaxy is the result of gas inflow to the center. Surrounding the center of NGC 2082, the spiral arms of the galaxy are irregular and reach close to the center. The galaxy is host to a nuclear star cluster with an estimated mass of 3 million M_{☉}, and a supermassive black hole with an estimated mass 6.2 million M_{☉}. It is also home to a population of 27 known globular clusters.

One supernova has been observed in NGC 2082. SN 1992ba (Type II, mag. 14) was discovered by Robert Evans on 30 September 1992.

== See also ==
- List of NGC objects (1001–2000)
