= NGC 1581 =

Galaxy in the constellation Dorado

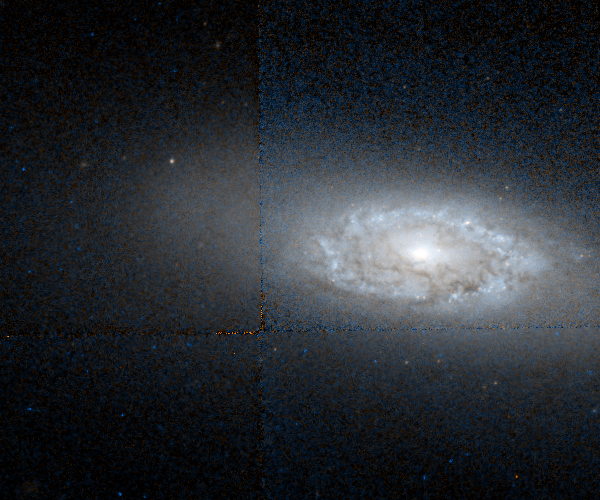
- NGC 1581 the Hubble Space Telescope

Observation data (J2000 epoch)
- Constellation: Dorado
- Right ascension: 04^{h} 24^{m} 44.9^{s}
- Declination: −54° 56′ 31″
- Redshift: 0.005337 ± 0.000090
- Heliocentric radial velocity: 1,600 ± 27 km/s
- Distance: 67.8 ± 4.9 Mly (20.8 ± 1.5 Mpc)
- Group or cluster: Dorado Group
- Apparent magnitude (V): 12.5

Characteristics
- Type: S0-
- Apparent size (V): 1.8′ × 0.7′

Other designations
- ESO 157-26, IRAS04236-5503, PGC 15055

NGC 1581 is a lenticular galaxy in the constellation Dorado. The galaxy lies about 65 million light years away from Earth, which means, given its apparent dimensions, that NGC 1581 is approximately 40,000 light years across. It was discovered by John Herschel on December 5, 1834. It is a member of the Dorado Group. NGC 1581 forms a pair with spiral galaxy NGC 1566, which lies at a distance of 41 arcminutes, which corresponds to a projected distance of 210,000 parsecs (680,000 ly).

NGC 1581 features an inner ring visible in H-alpha and [N II] images. The ring is brighter towards its western part. There are bright H II regions near the centre and the inner ring of the galaxy. It is possible the star formation in the ring of the galaxy is fueled by gas NGC 1581 stripped from the larger NGC 1566. However, currently, the galaxy doesn't show obvious signs of interaction. A diffuse hydrogen trail is indicative of the past interaction of the two galaxies. A low surface brightness galaxy, LSB-D, lies about at the same projected distance from NGC 1581 and NGC 1566, about 190 kpc. Between LSB-D and NGC 1581 has been detected a hydrogen cloud.
