= NGC 855 =

Galaxy in the constellation Triangulum

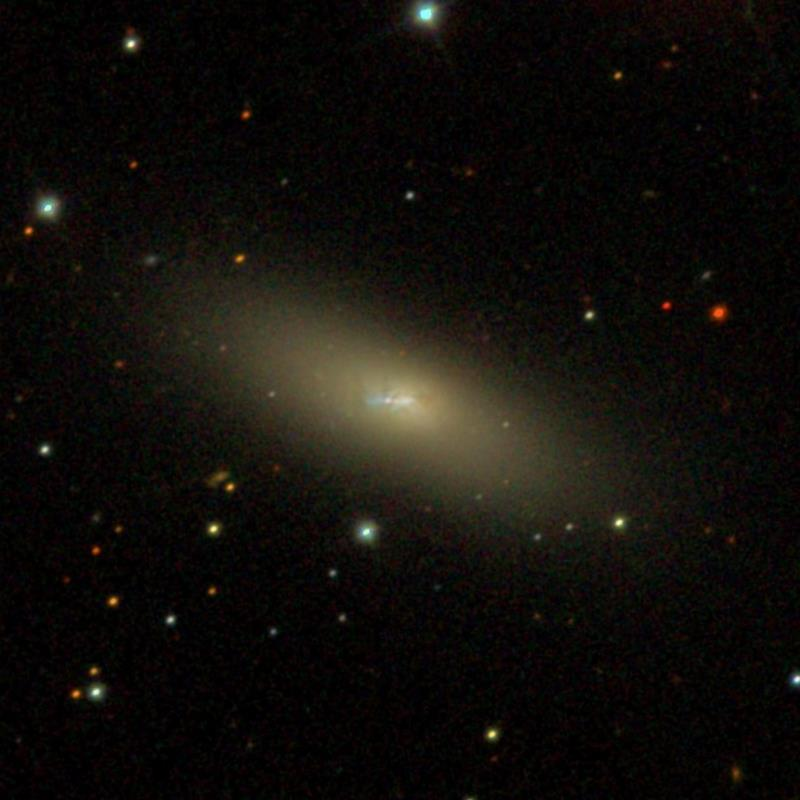

Observation data (J2000 epoch)
- Constellation: Triangulum
- Right ascension: 02^{h} 14^{m} 03.4946^{s}
- Declination: 27° 52′ 37.966″
- Redshift: 0.001975±0.000017
- Heliocentric radial velocity: 592 ± 5 km/s
- Apparent magnitude (V): 12.6
- Apparent magnitude (B): 13.3

Other designations
- NGC 855 • UGC 1718 • PGC 8557 • CGCG 504-035 • MCG +05-06-016 • IRAS 02111+2738 • KUG 0211+276 • 2MASX J02140361+2752378 • CN 26 613

NGC 855 is a star-forming dwarf elliptical galaxy located in the constellation Triangulum. The discovery and a first description (as H 26 613) was realized by William Herschel on 26 October 1786 and the findings made public through his Catalogue of Nebulae and Clusters of Stars, published the same year.

NGC 855's relative velocity to the cosmic microwave background is 343 ± 18 km/s (343 ± 18) km/s, corresponding to a Hubble distance of 5.06 ± 0.44 Mpc (~16.5 million ly). There is some uncertainty about its precise distance since two surface brightness fluctuation measurements give a distance of 9.280 ± 0.636 Mpc (~30.3 million ly), a range outside the Hubble distance determined by the galaxy's redshift survey.

== Star formation ==
Using infrared data collected from two regions in the center of the galaxy by the Spitzer Space Telescope, astronomers were able to suggest NGC 855 to be a star-forming galaxy. Its HI distribution (Neutral atomic hydrogen emission lines) suggests the star-forming activity might have been triggered by a minor merger.

== See also ==
- New General Catalogue
- List of NGC objects
