= NGC 1533 =

Galaxy in the constellation Dorado

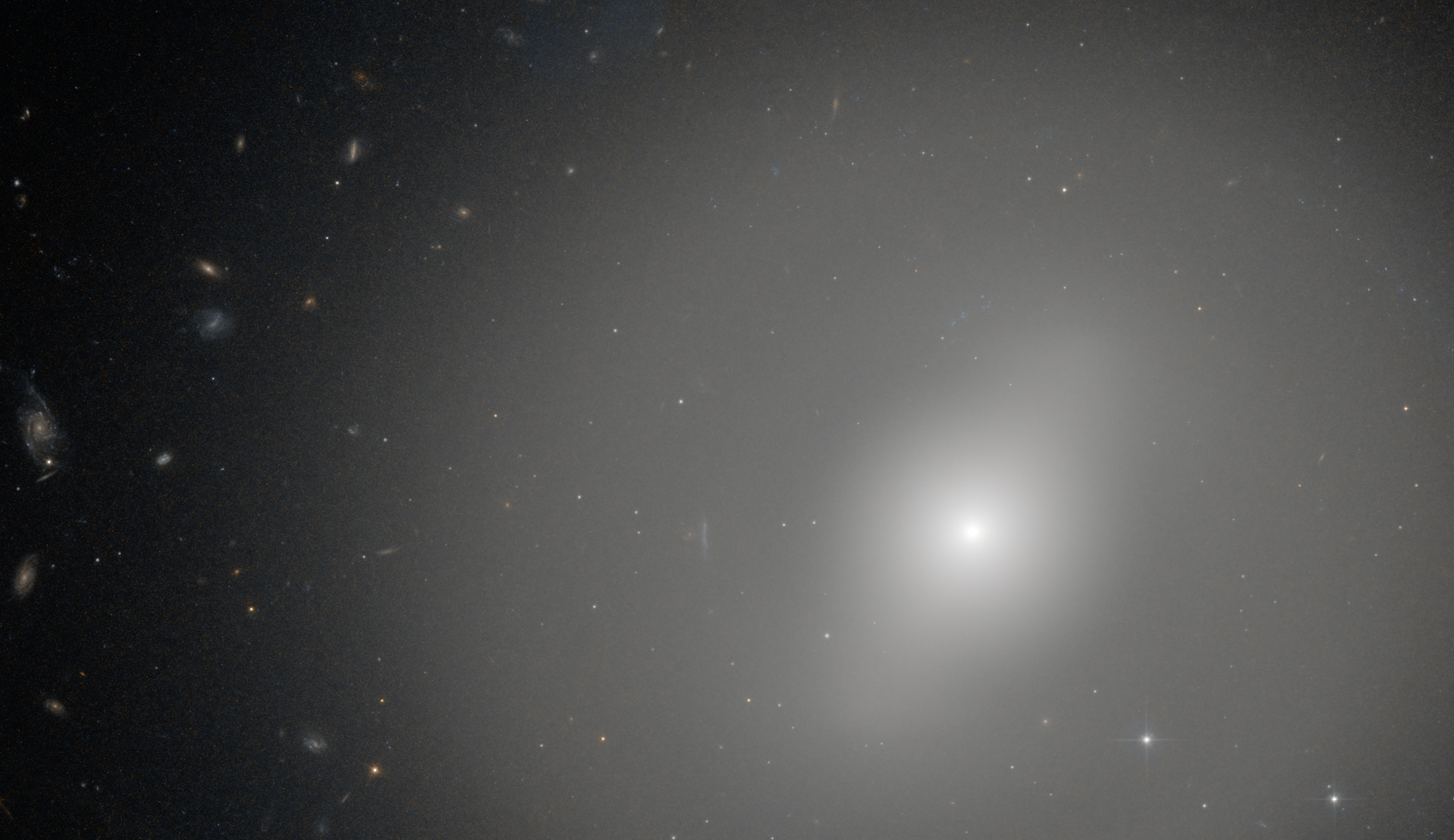

Observation data (J2000 epoch)
- Constellation: Dorado
- Right ascension: 04^{h} 09^{m} 51.8^{s}
- Declination: −56° 07′ 06″
- Redshift: 790 ± 5 km/s
- Distance: 62 ± 4 Mly (19.0 ± 1.1 Mpc)^{[a]}
- Apparent magnitude (V): 11.7

Characteristics
- Type: (L)SB(rs)0^{0}
- Apparent size (V): 2.8′ × 2.3′

Other designations
- PGC 14582

NGC 1533 is a barred lenticular galaxy with faint spiral structure in the constellation Dorado. The seventh-brightest member of the Dorado Group and 1° off the group's center, it is surrounded by a vast arc or ring of H I which is connected to IC 2038 and IC 2039. The ring orbits around 32 kpc from the center.^{[b]} As is typical of lenticular galaxies, star formation is weak in NGC 1533. Using both the surface brightness fluctuation (SBF) and globular cluster luminosity function (GCLF) methods, its distance was estimated in 2007 to be 19.4 ± 1.1 Mpc and 18.6 ± 2.0 Mpc respectively. Averaging these together gives a distance of around 19 million parsecs or 62 million light-years from earth.^{[a]} In 1970, a supernova was detected in NGC 1533.

NGC 1533 was discovered by John Herschel on December 5, 1834.

== Notes ==
1. average(19.4 ± 1.1, 18.6 ± 2.0) = ((19.4 + 18.6) / 2) ± ((1.1^{2} + 2.0^{2})^{0.5} / 2) = 19.0 ± 1.1
2. 35 kpc calculated assuming a distance of 21 Mpc converts to a distance of 32 (35 ÷ 21 × 19) kpc for the current distance estimate of 19 Mpc
