= NGC 1311 =

Galaxy in the constellation Horologium

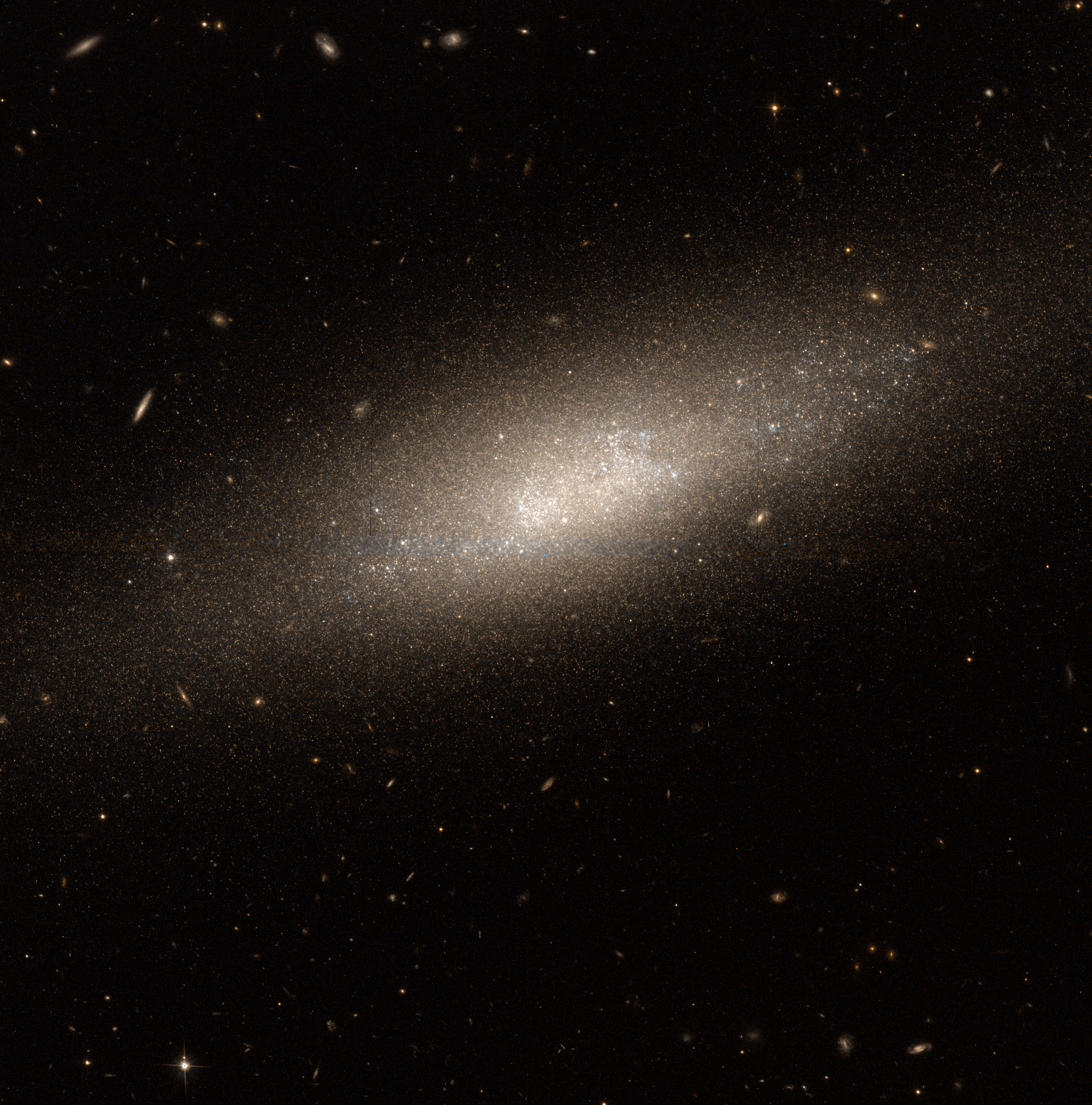
- NGC 1311 imaged by Hubble Space Telescope

Observation data (J2000 epoch)
- Constellation: Horologium
- Right ascension: 03^{h} 20^{m} 06.9^{s}
- Declination: −52° 11′ 08″
- Redshift: 0.001911 ± 0.000007
- Heliocentric radial velocity: 573 ± 2 km/s
- Distance: 4.932 ± 1.003 Mpc
- Apparent magnitude (V): 13.0
- Apparent magnitude (B): 13.4

Characteristics
- Type: SBm
- Apparent size (V): 3.0′ × 0.8′

Other designations
- ESO 200-7, IRAS 03186-5222

NGC 1311 is a nearby late-type barred spiral galaxy, occasionally described as a dwarf irregular or emission-line galaxy, and a potential weak Seyfert 2 active galaxy candidate located in the constellation Horologium. It was discovered by John Herschel in 1837.

== IC 1954 Group ==
NGC 1311 is a part of the IC 1954 galaxy group, a small assembly of nearby galaxies in Horologium and surrounding regions. The group includes:

- IC 1959
- IC 1933
- IC 1954
- ESO 200-G045
- NGC 1249
- NGC 1311

== Structure and star formation ==
NGC 1311’s structure is characteristic of a Magellanic barred spiral, with a weak bar and loosely wound spiral arms. Its star formation occurs in bursts, with 13 identified candidate star clusters showing ages clustered around 10 Myr, 100 Myr, and >1 Gyr. The galaxy’s isolation and low mass contribute to its distinct star-forming behavior, following the luminosity-metallicity relation typical of late-type dwarf galaxies.

The Hubble Space Telescope revealed a population of star clusters with masses ranging from ~10³ to ~10^{5} solar masses, with more massive clusters generally being older. Star formation is concentrated in two regions, each ~200 parsecs in size, at the east and west ends of a central bar-like structure. These regions host hot main-sequence stars and blue supergiants, with roughly half of the young stellar population located there.

== See also ==
- List of NGC objects (1001-2000)
