= NGC 1574 =

Galaxy in the constellation Reticulum

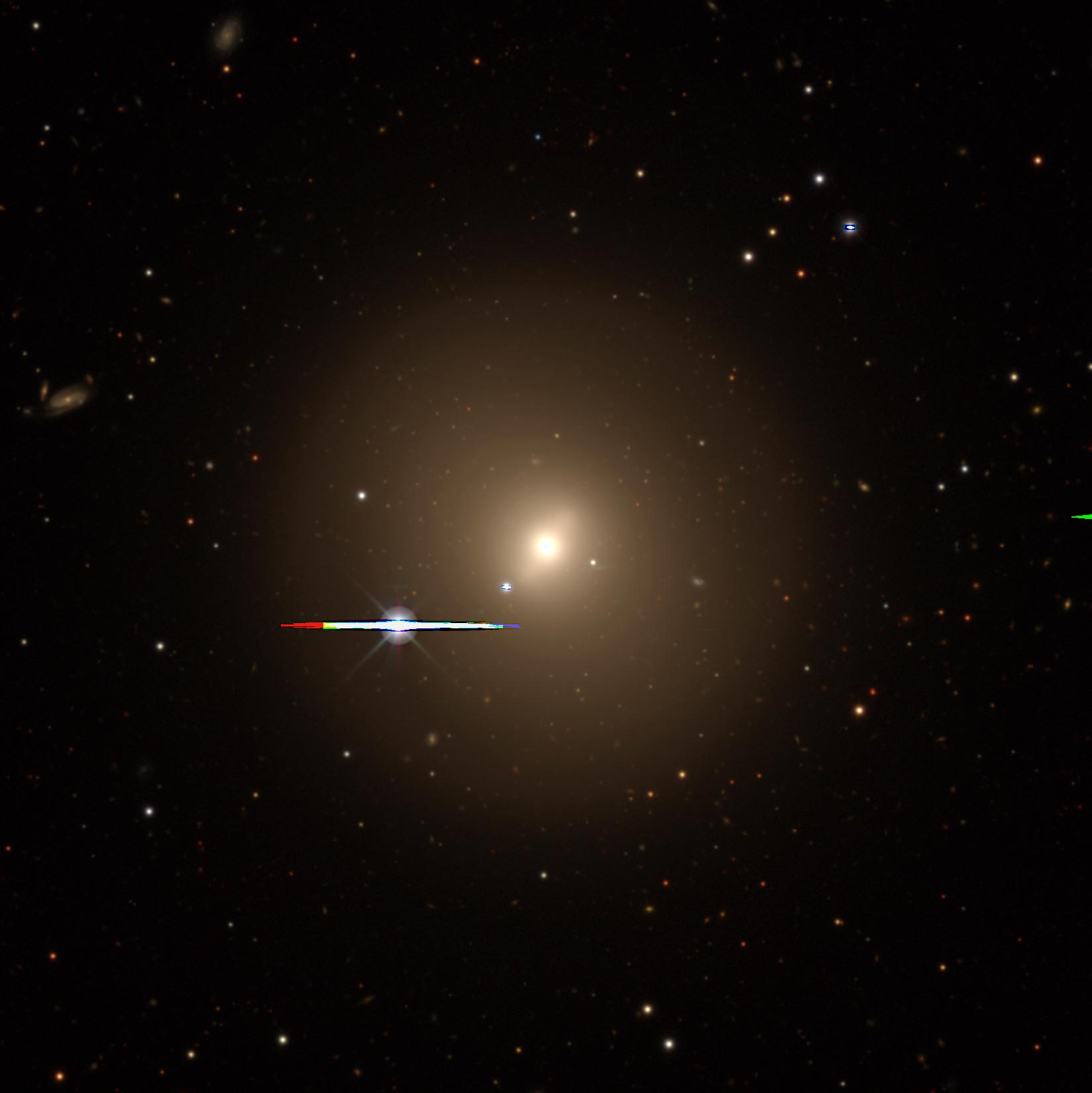
- NGC 1574 by the Legacy Survey DR10

Observation data (J2000 epoch)
- Constellation: Reticulum
- Right ascension: 04^{h} 21^{m} 58.7^{s}
- Declination: −56° 58′ 28″
- Redshift: 0.003472 ± 0.000053
- Heliocentric radial velocity: 1,041 ± 16 km/s
- Distance: 53.7 ± 19.1 Mly (16.5 ± 5.9 Mpc)
- Group or cluster: Dorado Group
- Apparent magnitude (V): 10.3

Characteristics
- Type: SA0^-
- Apparent size (V): 3.4′ × 3.1′

Other designations
- ESO 157-22, AM 0421-570, IRAS F04210-5705, PGC 14965

NGC 1574 is a lenticular galaxy in the constellation Reticulum. The galaxy lies about 55 million light years away from Earth, which means, given its apparent dimensions, that NGC 1574 is approximately 75,000 light years across. It was discovered by John Herschel on December 4, 1834. It is a member of the Dorado Group.

The galaxy features a bar embedded in an extended disk. A nearly complete ring surrounds the bar. The galaxy is seen nearly face-on, at an inclination of about 27°. Carbon monoxide gas has been lying in a disk about 2.6 arcseconds across, which corresponds to about 200 parsecs, around the nucleus. The kinematics suggest that it is due to a warp in the disk. The nucleus of the galaxy doesn't appear to be active. The supermassive black hole is estimated to have a mass of (1.0±0.2)×10^{8} M_{☉}.
