= SN 2021aefx =

Supernova in the galaxy NGC 1566

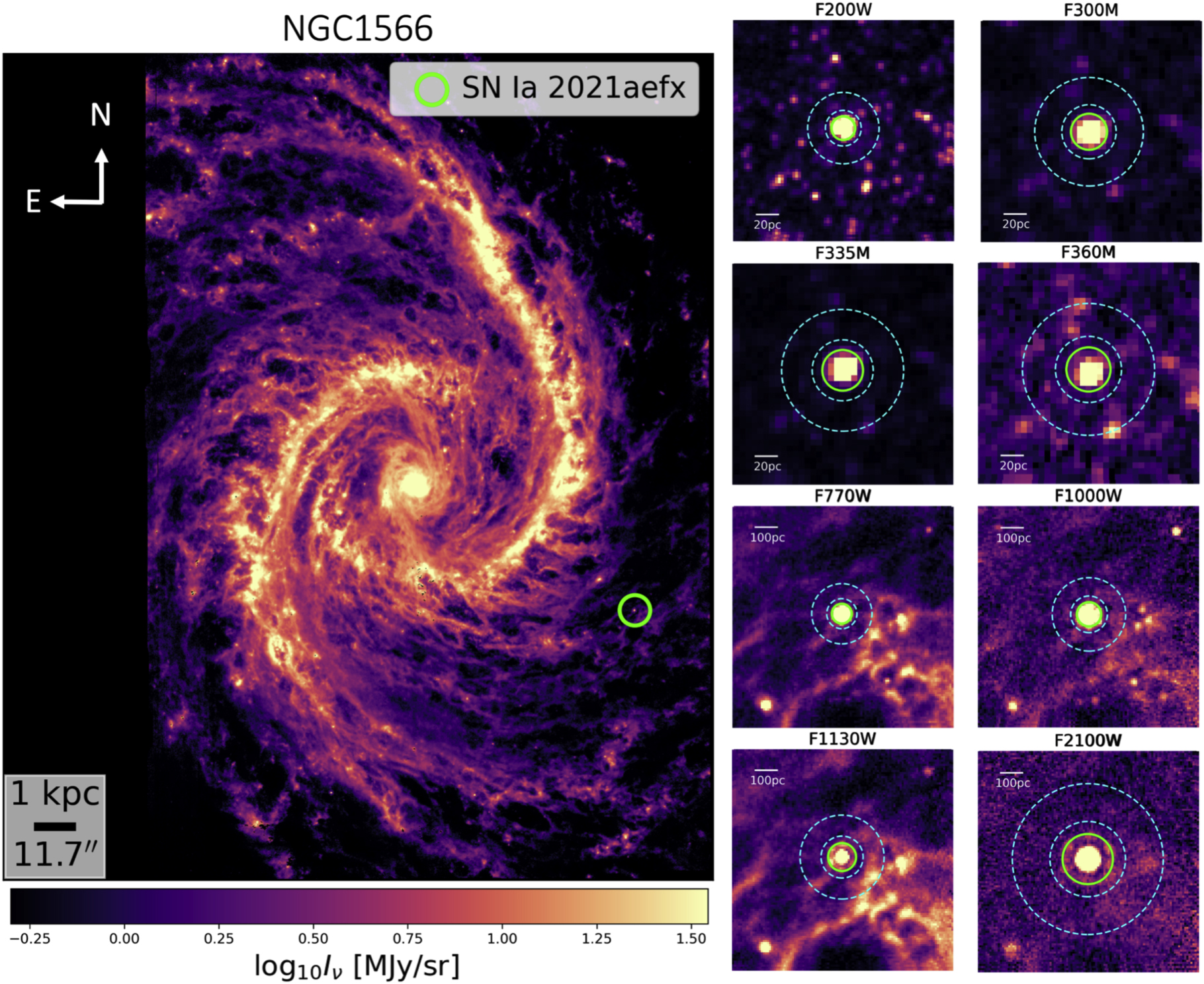
- SN 2021aefx in NGC 1566 at ≈2–21 μm. Left panel: MIRI F1130W PHANGS-JWST image of NGC 1566 showing the location of SN 2021aefx, marked with a green circle. Right panels: zoom-ins on SN 2021aefx in each PHANGS-JWST filter.
- Ia
- Constellation: Dorado
- Right ascension: 04^{h} 19^{m} 53.402^{s}
- Declination: −54° 56′ 53.08″
- Distance: 17.69 ± 2.02 Mpc
- Redshift: 0.00502 ± 0.00001
- Host: NGC 1566

SN 2021aefx is a Type Ia supernova discovered in 2021 in the galaxy NGC 1566.

== Discovery ==
SN 2021aefx was discovered on November 11, 2021, by the Distance Less Than 40 Mpc (DLT40) transient survey in the spiral galaxy NGC 1566 at a distance of 17.69 ± 2.02 Mpc. It is located 61.2″ west and 36.5″ south of the center. It was discovered at apparent magnitude of 17.24 and classified as a high-velocity SN Type Ia.

== Observations ==
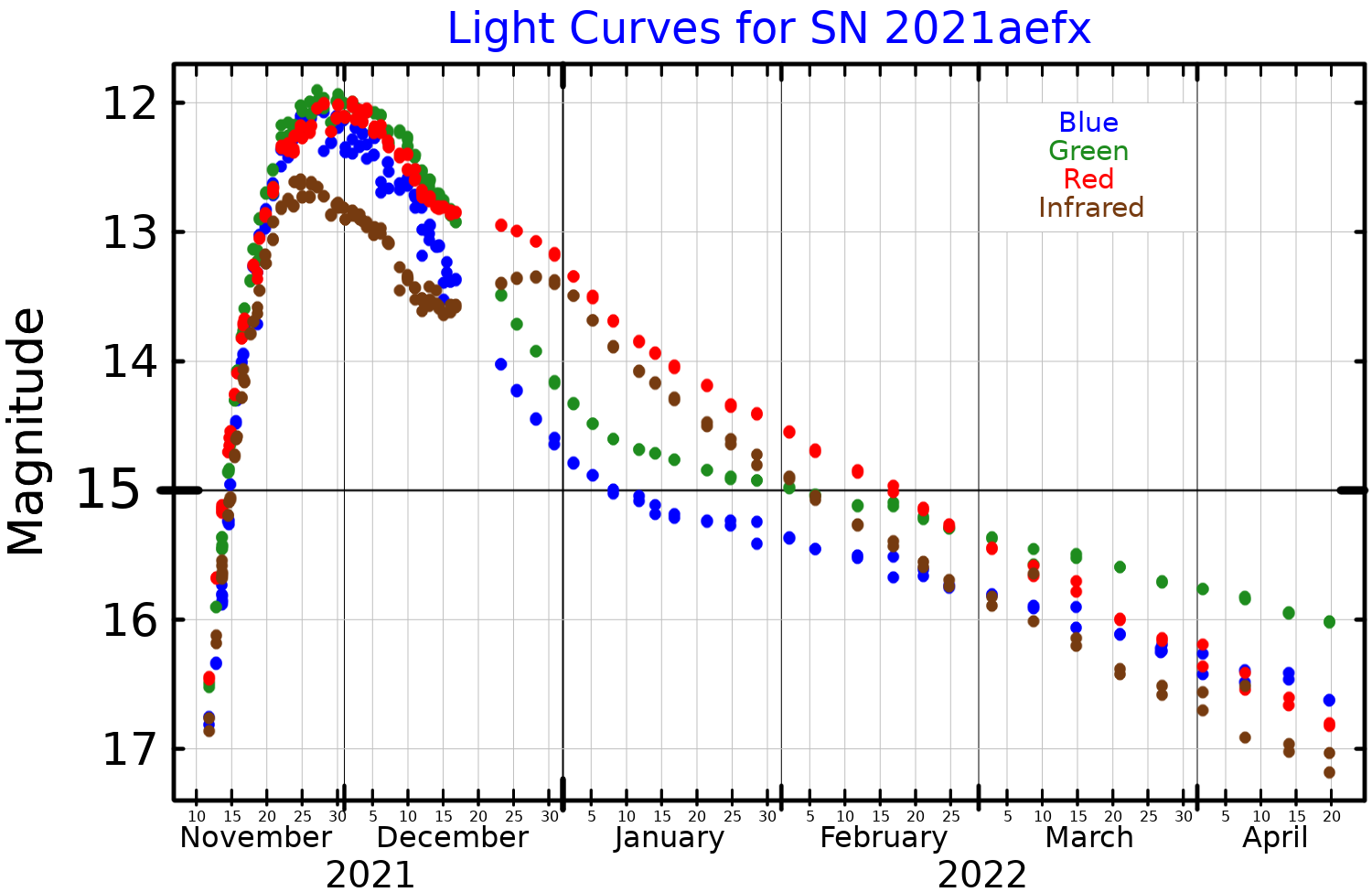
Light curves for SN 2021aefx in four photometric bands, plotted from data published by Hosseinzadeh et al. (2022)

SN 2021aefx was observed in multiband by the Precision Observations for Infant Supernovae Explosions (POISE) a day after discovery. The photometry was obtained on the 1 m Swope Telescope at the Las Campanas Observatory. Observations were acquired twice per night in order to look for small scale fluctuations in the light curve.

The brightness and close proximity of SN 2021aefx make it an excellent target for nebular-phase James Webb Space Telescope observations. Kwok et al. (2022) and DerKacy et al. (2023) provided the first demonstration of the impressive spectroscopic capabilities of JWST for studying nebular-phase SNe Ia. Their spectra of SN 2021aefx, obtained +255 and +323 days after, respectively, represent the highest-quality look at the emission properties >2.5 μm of SNe Ia to date. Their spectra show prominent emission features from the iron-group elements (Ni, Co, Fe), as well as a wide, flat-topped [Ar iii] profile that indicates a spherical shell of emission.

Researchers show that "the observations of SN 2021aefx are consistent with an off-center delayed detonation explosion of a near–Chandrasekhar mass (MCh) WD at a viewing angle of −30° relative to the point of the deflagration to detonation transition."
