= NGC 1549 =

Galaxy in the constellation Dorado

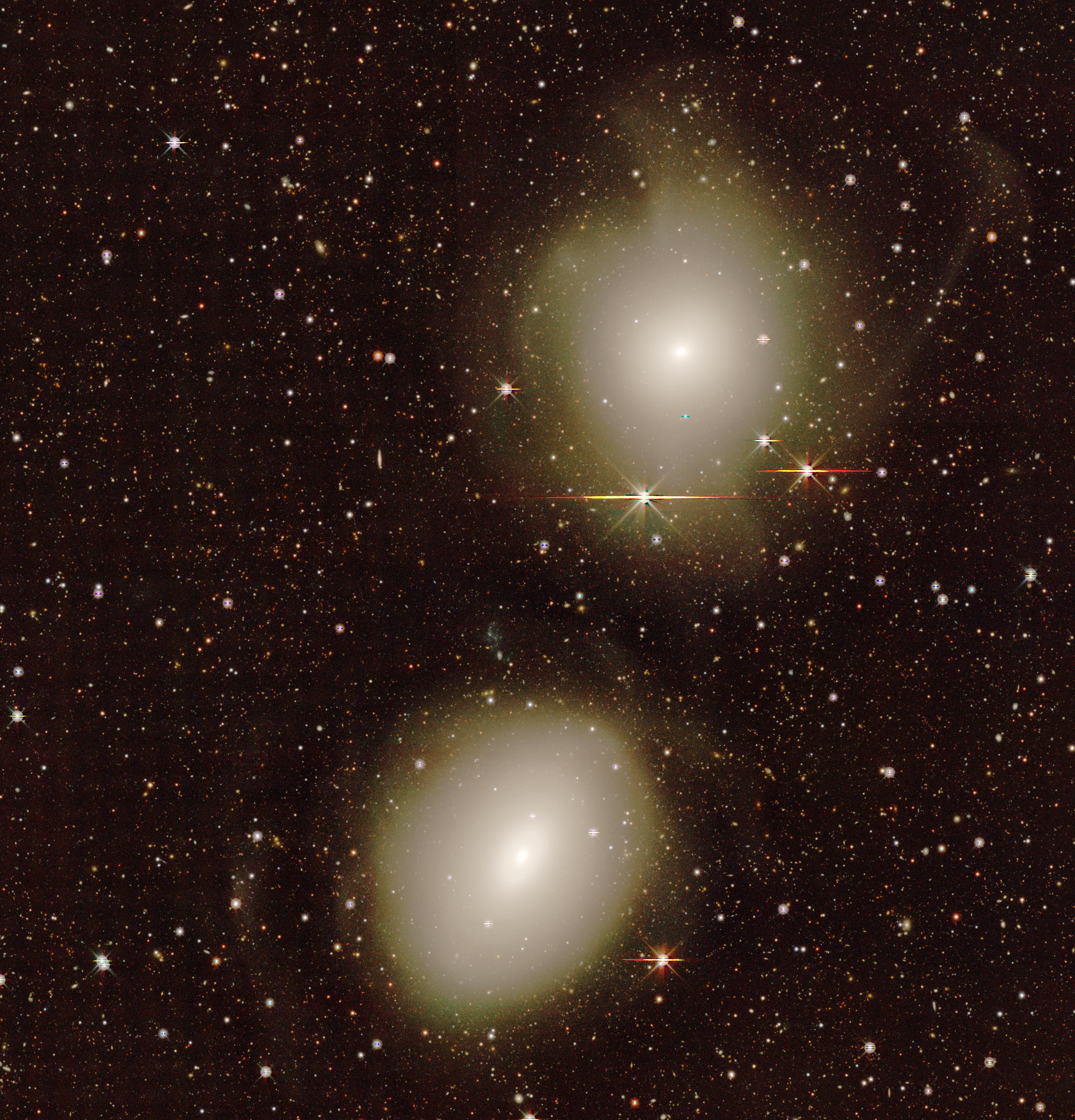
- NGC 1549 (top) and NGC 1553 (bottom) by legacy surveys

Observation data (J2000 epoch)
- Constellation: Dorado
- Right ascension: 04^{h} 15^{m} 45.1^{s}
- Declination: −55° 35′ 32″
- Redshift: 0.004190 ± 0.000040
- Heliocentric radial velocity: 1,256 ± 12 km/s
- Distance: 51.2 ± 14 Mly (15.7 ± 4.4 Mpc)
- Group or cluster: Dorado Group
- Apparent magnitude (V): 9.6

Characteristics
- Type: E0-1
- Apparent size (V): 4.9′ × 4.1′

Other designations
- ESO 157-G16, AM 0414-554, PGC 14757

NGC 1549 is an elliptical galaxy located in the constellation Dorado. It is located at a distance of about 50 million light years from Earth, which, given its apparent dimensions, means that NGC 1549 is about 75,000 light years across. NGC 1549 was discovered by John Herschel on 6 December 1835 and may have been observed by James Dunlop in 1826. It is a member of the Dorado Group.

In the centre of NGC 1549 is expected to lie a supermassive black hole, whose mass is estimated to be between 390 and 810 million (10^{8.76+0.15
−0.17}) M_{☉} based on the Sérsic index of the galaxy. No polycyclic aromatic hydrocarbons (PAHs) emission, an indicator for the presence of interstellar dust, was detected by the Infrared Spectrograph onboard Spitzer Space Telescope. NGC 1549 has been found to emit X-rays, with its total flux exceeding 2×10^{40} ergs s–1 for the 0.3–5 keV band. A total number of 150 globular clusters are estimated to exist in NGC 1549, a number low compared to similar size galaxies. The outer isophotes of the galaxy appear twisted and feature faint shells.

NGC 1549 forms an interacting pair with the lenticular galaxy NGC 1553, which lies 12 arcminutes to the south. It is the largest elliptical galaxy in a moderate size galaxy group known as the Dorado Group.
