= NGC 1947 =

Galaxy in the constellation Dorado

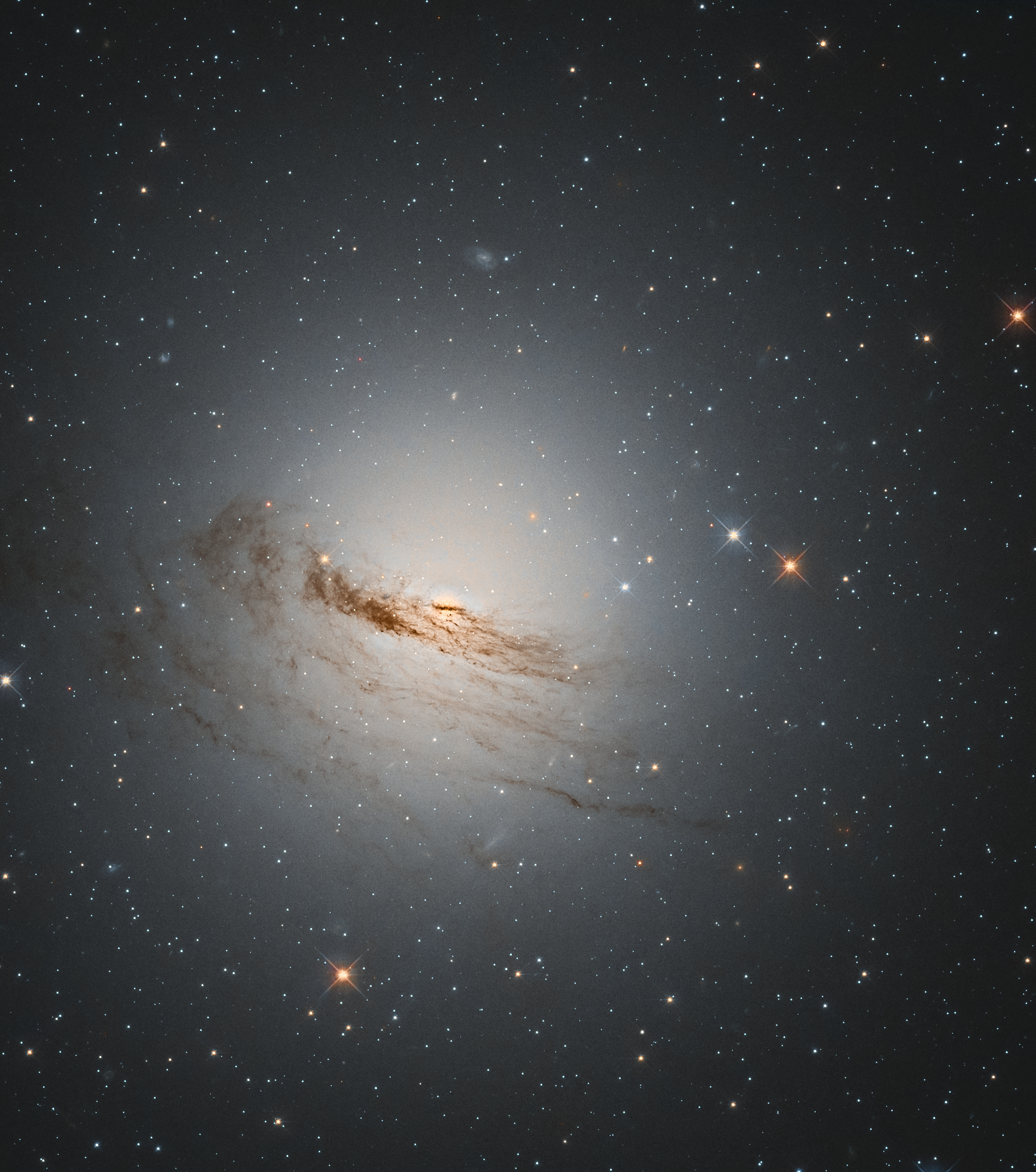
- NGC 1947 by Hubble Space Telescope

Observation data (J2000 epoch)
- Constellation: Dorado
- Right ascension: 05^{h} 26^{m} 47.6^{s}
- Declination: −63° 45′ 36″
- Redshift: 0.003669 ± 0.000080
- Heliocentric radial velocity: 1,100 ± 24 km/s
- Distance: 47.8 ± 11.7 Mly (14.65 ± 3.6 Mpc)
- Apparent magnitude (V): 10.8

Characteristics
- Type: S0- pec
- Apparent size (V): 3.0′ × 2.6′
- Notable features: Polar-ring

Other designations
- ESO 085-G87, AM 0526-634, IRAS 05264-6347, PGC 17296

NGC 1947 is a peculiar lenticular galaxy in the constellation Dorado. The galaxy lies about 50 million light years away from Earth, which means, given its apparent dimensions, that NGC 1947 is approximately 75,000 light years across. It was discovered by James Dunlop on November 5, 1826.

== Characteristics ==
The galaxy is characterised by the presence of dust lanes across the minor axis of the galaxy, indicating it is a polar-ring galaxy. The galaxy has one central dust lane while three more less pronounced lanes are visible which look like concentric rings. Although it is categorised as a lenticular galaxy, it lacks a disk, having thus more in common with elliptical galaxies.

Molecular gas has been detected around the nucleus of the galaxy with an estimated hydrogen mass of 4.2×10^{8} M_{☉}. The gas rotates in an axis perpendicular to that of the stars of the galaxy, but in its inner region it is warped. The kinematics suggest that the dust and gas have an external origin, probably accreted from a gas-rich galaxy, as there is a lack of tidal tails that would indicate it is as a result of an unequal mass merger with a disk galaxy.

The nucleus of the galaxy has been found to be active and it is categorised as a LINER. The most accepted theory for the energy source of active galactic nuclei is the presence of an accretion disk around a supermassive black hole.

== Nearby galaxies ==
NGC 1947 is the brightest galaxy in the NGC 1947 group, which also includes the galaxies ESO 085–065, ESO 085–088, and ESO 086–010. This group lies close to the Dorado Group, and is part of the Southern Supercluster.
