= NGC 1249 =

Galaxy in the constellation Horologium

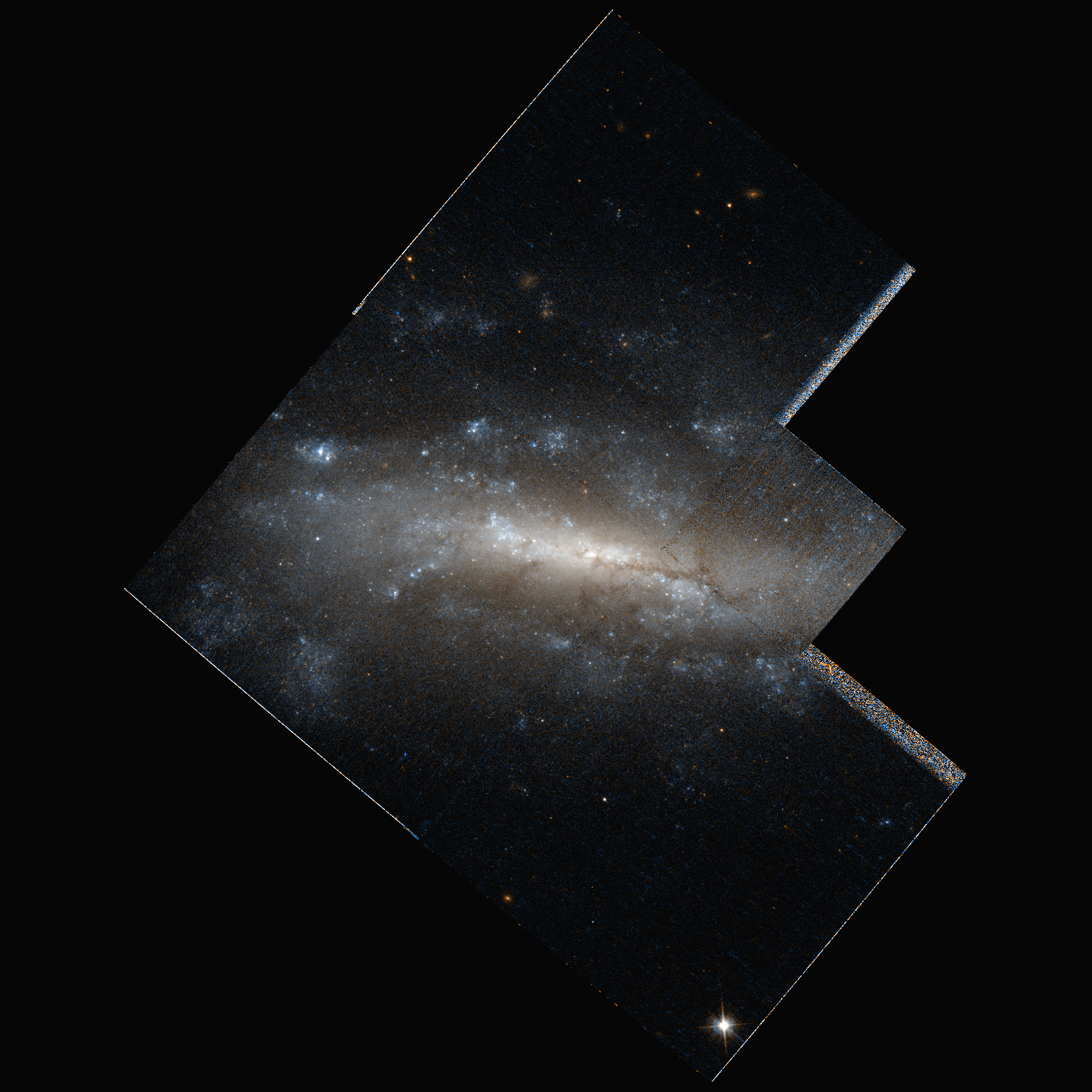
- Hubble Space Telescope image of NGC 1249

Observation data (J2000 epoch)
- Constellation: Horologium
- Right ascension: 03^{h} 10^{m} 01^{s}
- Declination: −53° 20′ 09″
- Redshift: 0.003576
- Heliocentric radial velocity: 1072 ± 2 km/s
- Apparent magnitude (B): 12.16

Characteristics
- Type: SB(rs)dm

Other designations
- NGC 1249, LEDA 11836, IRAS 03085-5331

NGC 1249 is a barred spiral galaxy in the constellation Horologium. It was discovered by John Herschel on December 5, 1834.

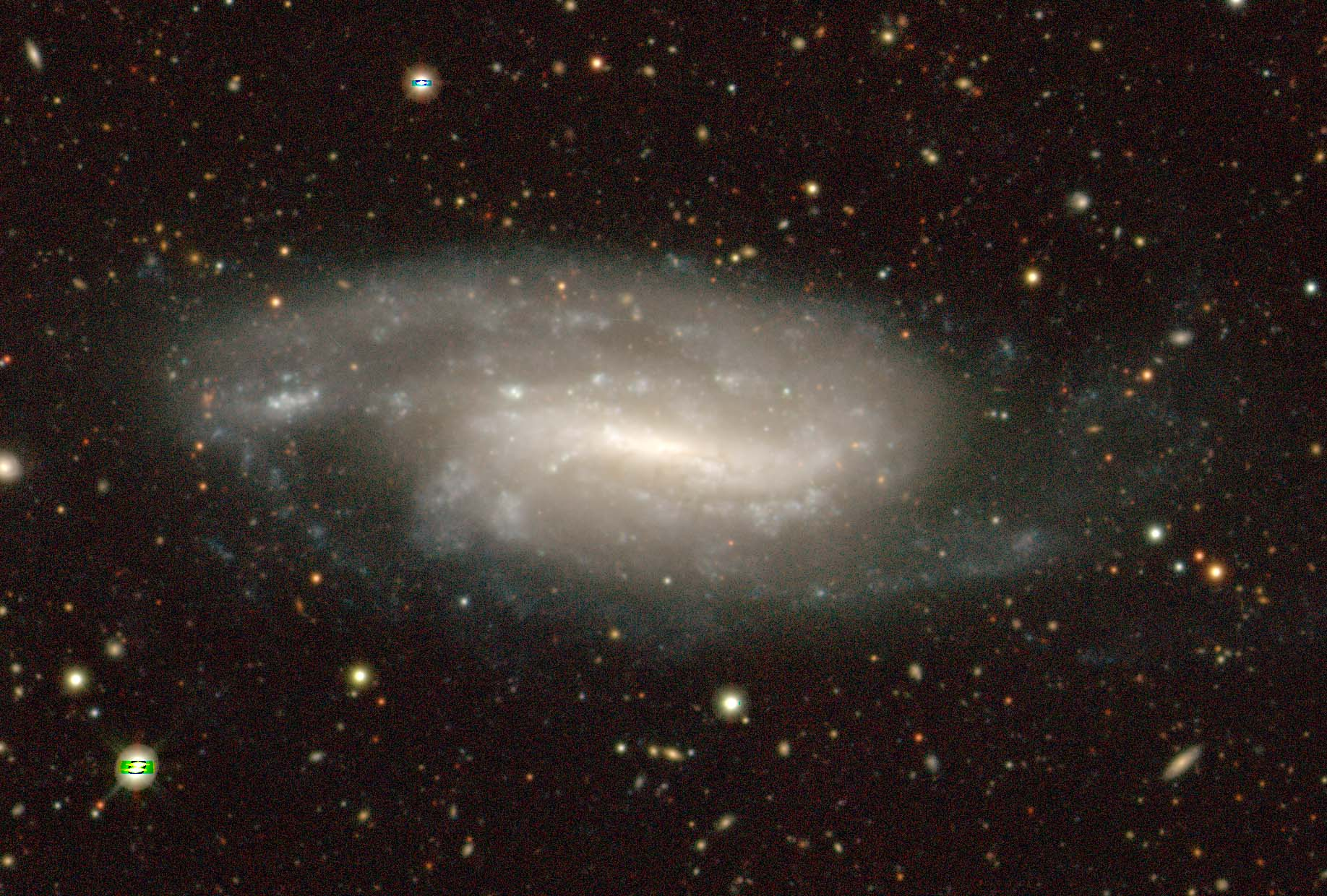
Complete view of NGC 1249 with the legacy surveys

== See also ==
- List of NGC objects (1001–2000)
