= NGC 1553 =

Galaxy in the constellation Dorado

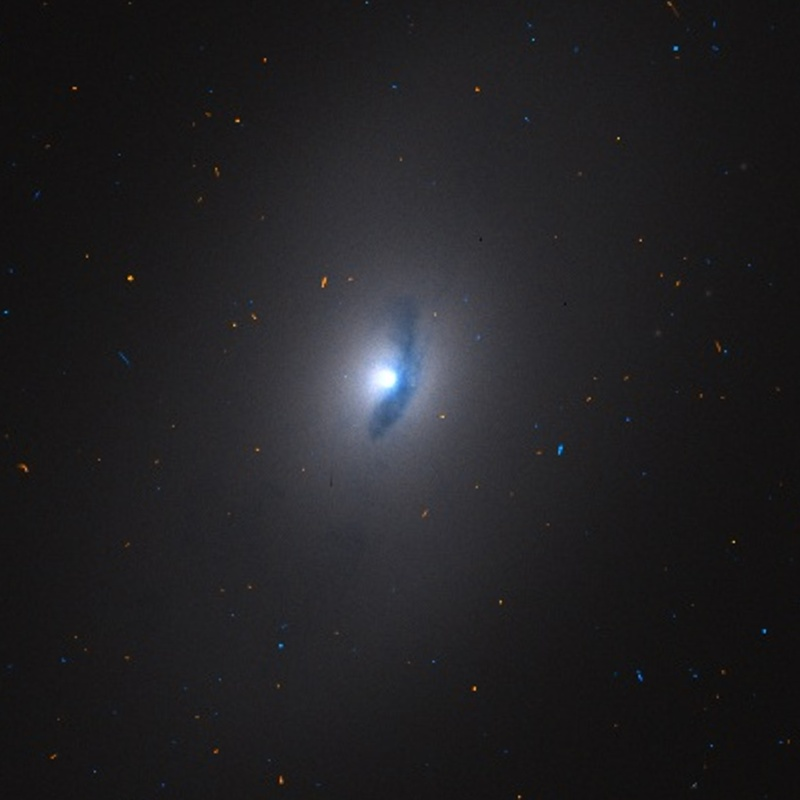
- NGC 1553 core by HST, 0.3′ view

Observation data (J2000 epoch)
- Constellation: Dorado
- Right ascension: 04^{h} 16^{m} 10.5^{s}
- Declination: −55° 46′ 49″
- Redshift: 1080 ± 11 km/s
- Distance: 78.9 Mly(24.2 Mpc)
- Apparent magnitude (V): 10.3

Characteristics
- Type: SA(rl)0^{0}
- Apparent size (V): 4′.5 × 2′.8

Other designations
- PGC 14765, IRAS 04150-5554, ESO 157-17, and AM 0415-555

NGC 1553 is a prototypical lenticular galaxy in the constellation Dorado. It is the second brightest member of the Dorado Group of galaxies. British astronomer John Herschel discovered NGC 1553 on December 5, 1834 using an 18.7 inch reflector.

== Interacting galaxy ==
It forms a pair of interacting galaxies together with elliptical NGC 1549 which lies 11′.8 away from it in the sky. Their interaction appears to be in the early stage and can be seen in optical wavelengths by faint but distinct irregular shells of emission and a curious jet on the northwest side. Together, these two galaxies comprise the center of the Dorado group.

== Characteristics ==
NGC 1553 is an early type galaxy with a luminosity of 4×10^{10} L_{☉}. It has been detected in H I but has an H I mass to B-band luminosity ratio (M_{HI}/L_{B}) of less than 0.01. NGC 1553's ultraviolet spectrum shows weak flux under the main-sequence turn off at around 2,400 A°. This is characteristic of old intermediate populations of quiescent lenticular galaxies.

NGC 1553 has an especially well developed lens (~36″) component of nearly constant surface brightness that is found between the bulge and the exponential disk. Its lens is similar to what is found in NGC 3945 and its inner parts are very hot.

NGC 1553 has associated with itself cool gas and dust. It can also be seen in infrared and is a weak radio source. Hubble observations in 2000 revealed an inner torus-like dust lane about 3″ across at the galaxy's center.

Chandra X-ray imaging of NGC 1553 show diffuse hot gas making up 70% of the emissions, dotted with many point-like sources (low-mass X-ray binaries) making up the rest. Similarly to NGC 4697 and Messier 60, these bright spots are due to binary star systems of black holes and neutron stars most of which are located in globular clusters and reflect this old galaxy's very active past. In these systems, material pulled off a regular star is heated and gives off X-rays as it falls toward the accompanying black hole or neutron star. The brightest of the point sources is coincident with the galaxy's optical nucleus. Its luminosity and spectrum suggest its being an obscured central active galactic nucleus (AGN). This source is visible in the center of the X-ray image of NGC 1553 shown above.

== Globular clusters ==
Globular clusters have been resolved in the galaxy by the Hubble Space Telescope. There are an estimated 600^{+300}_{−200} globulars in NGC 1553. Like Messier 87, there is a central deficit of globulars with respect to the underlying luminosity.

== Spiral feature ==
NGC 1553 has a roughly symmetrical X-ray spiral feature (not detected in visible light) with a possible 10″ inner bar in the diffuse emission near the center of the galaxy. This feature is probably due to adiabatic or shock compression of ambient gas perhaps due to interaction with the radio source. Hα emission also has spiral structure which is surprisingly similar to the X-ray spiral.
