= Surface brightness fluctuation =

Standard candle used to estimate distances to galaxies

Extragalactic distance ladder

Surface brightness fluctuation (SBF) is a secondary distance indicator used to estimate distances to galaxies. It is useful to 100 Mpc (parsec). The method measures the variance in a galaxy's light distribution arising from fluctuations in the numbers of and luminosities of individual stars per resolution element.

The SBF technique uses the fact that galaxies are made up of a finite number of stars. The number of stars in any small patch of a galaxy will vary from point to point, creating a noise-like fluctuation in its surface brightness. While the various stars present in a galaxy will cover an enormous range of luminosity, the SBF can be characterized as having an average brightness. A galaxy twice as far away appears twice as smooth as a result of the averaging. Older elliptical galaxies have fairly consistent stellar populations, thus it closely approximates a standard candle. In practice, corrections are required to account for variations in age or metallicity from galaxy to galaxy. Calibration of the method is made empirically from Cepheids or theoretically from stellar population models.

The SBF pattern is measured from the power spectrum of the residuals left behind from a deep galaxy image after a smooth model of the galaxy has been subtracted. The SBF pattern is evident as the transform of the point spread function in the Fourier domain. The amplitude of the spectrum gives the luminosity of the fluctuation star. Because the technique depends on a precise understanding of the image structure of the galaxy, extraneous sources such as globular clusters and background galaxies must be excluded. Corrections for interstellar dust absorption must also be accounted. In practice this means that SBF works best for elliptical galaxies or the bulges of S0 galaxies, and less so for spiral galaxies as they generally have complex morphologies and extensive dust features.

SBF is calibrated by use of nearby Cepheid period–luminosity relation (P–L) based on measurements of SBF magnitudes in the bulges of spiral galaxies with distances measured from Cepheid variables.

SBF is an indicator that uses stars in the old stellar populations (Population II).
