= James Dunlop =

19th-century British astronomer (1793-1848)

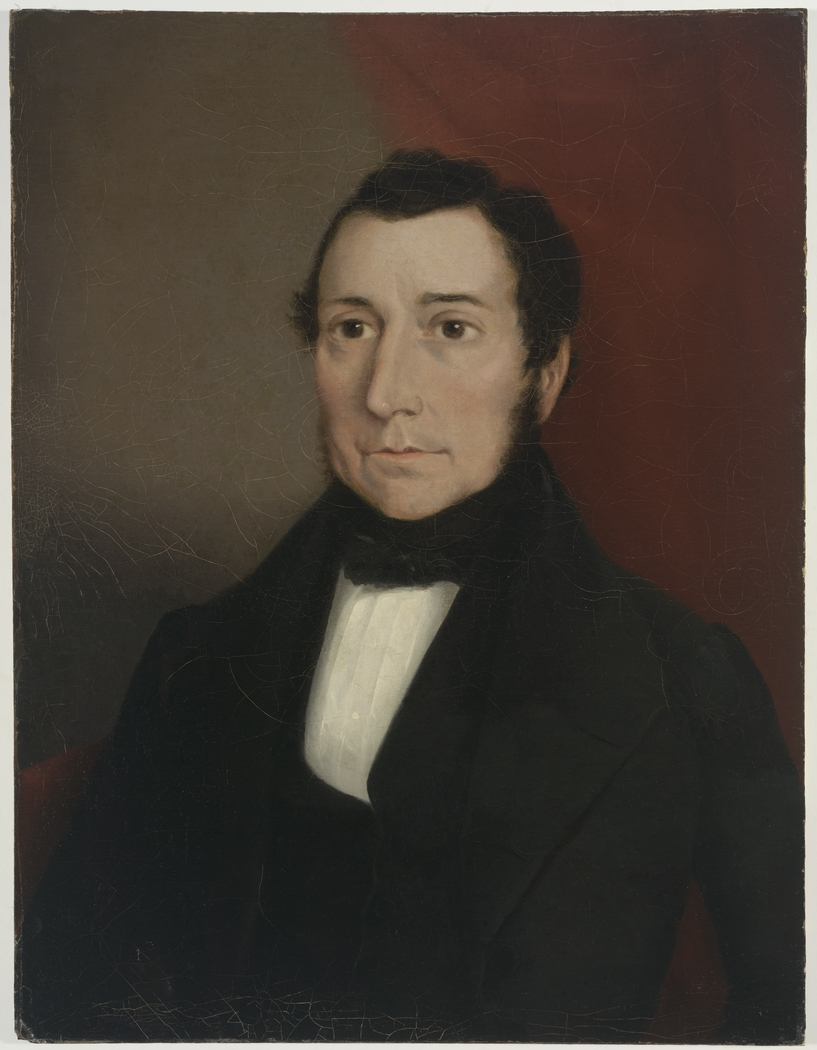
- 1843 oil portrait of James Dunlop by Joseph Backler
- Born: 31 October 1793; Dalry, Ayrshire, Scotland
- Died: 22 September 1848 (aged 54); New South Wales, Australia
- Resting place: St. Paul's Anglican Church Kincumber, New South Wales
- Known for: made 40,000 observations and catalogued some 7385 stars, of which included 166 double stars
- Spouse: Jean Service (m. 1816)
- Children: No children
- Awards: Gold Medal of the Royal Astronomical Society (1828)
- Scientific career
- Fields: Astronomy
- Workplaces: Paramatta Observatory

James Dunlop FRSE (31 October 1793 – 22 September 1848) was a British astronomer, noted for his work in Australia. He was employed by Sir Thomas Brisbane to work as astronomer's assistant at his private observatory, once located at Paramatta (now named Parramatta), New South Wales, about 23 kilometres (14 mi) west of Sydney during the 1820s and 1830s. Dunlop was mostly a visual observer, doing stellar astrometry work for Brisbane, and after its completion, then independently discovered and catalogued many new telescopic southern double stars and deep-sky objects. He later became the Superintendent of Paramatta Observatory when it was finally sold to the New South Wales Government.

== Early life ==
James Dunlop was born in Dalry, Ayrshire, Scotland, the son of John Dunlop, a weaver, and his wife Janet, née Boyle. He became interested in astronomy at an early age and was constructing telescopes in 1810. By fortune in 1820, he met Sir Thomas Brisbane. In the same year, Brisbane was appointed as the new Governor of New South Wales, who then decided to set up an astronomical observatory in the new Colony. Prior to leaving Britain, Dunlop was then appointed as his second scientific assistant, and both travelled to Sydney in 1821.

== Career in Australia ==
Soon after arriving, Brisbane almost immediately started building his observatory at Paramatta (original spelling), now named Parramatta, and it was Dunlop who was employed to do the astrometric observations for a new accurate southern star catalogue. Also employed was the German born Carl Ludwig Christian Rümker (or sometimes as Charles Karl Ludwig Rümker) (28 May 1788 – 21 December 1862), or simply Karl Rümker, who had been recruited by Brisbane as first astronomical assistant. Rümker soon left the observatory in protest of his treatment during 1823, leaving Dunlop in charge of the astrometric measures and general maintenance of the astronomical instruments and the Observatory. Dunlop was not a professionally trained astronomer, so he importantly lacked the necessary mathematical skills to do astrometric reductions. He had soon learned the necessary observational skills from the more able Rümker and his employer.

Between June 1823 and February 1826 Dunlop then made 40,000 observations and catalogued some 7,385 stars, of which included 166 double stars and references to several bright deep-sky objects near the bright stars he catalogued. By the beginning of March 1826, he left the Paramatta Observatory and continued working at his own home in Hunter Street, Paramatta. For there he began organising his own observations of double stars and deep-sky objects for the next 18 months, in which he constructed telescopes and other equipment for his dedicated southern sky survey.

Sir Thomas Brisbane, before finally departing Sydney for the last time in December 1825, arranged to sell all of his instruments to the Government so the observatory could continue to function. Some of the equipment he gave to Dunlop, which he used at his home, especially the useful small equatorial mounted 8.0 centimetres (3.1 in) refracting telescope that Rümker, and later Dunlop, both used for doing the important double stars measures as their own personal projects.

By May 1826, Rümker returned to the observatory, and seven months later he was appointed as the first New South Wales Government Astronomer, though this officially did not happen until a few years later, much to Rümker's disgust, due to delays from his employers in Britain.

== Back to Britain ==
On arrival, he also reduced his southern double stars and deep-sky observations for publication, which was believed to have taken about one month, and these were published also in the first half of 1828.

These two detailed astronomical papers were received with many accolades from his peers, which lasted until about 1834, when his observations were able to be scrutinised by John Herschel and Thomas Maclear in South Africa. Only then were the various flaws of his observations revealed, and the time spent in the zenith of popularly, then dwindled to fierce criticism and personal rejection especially from the British astronomical community.

== Return to Australia ==
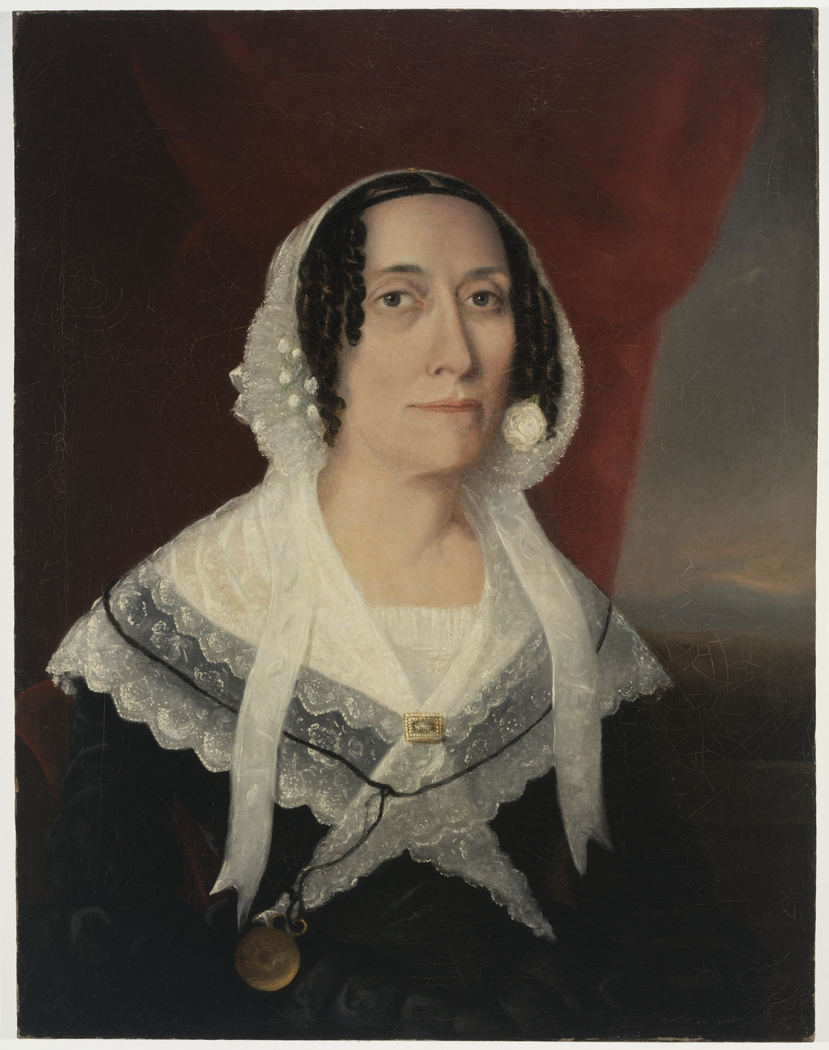
Jane Dunlop

In April 1831, Dunlop was appointed superintendent of the Government observatory at Parramatta. He was selected mainly from his good knowledge of Colony and the observatory site, but the real reason for his selection was more because even though such an astronomical position was formally advertised, nobody applied for the astronomical tenure. Here he was to succeed Rümker with the reasonably good salary of £300 a year.

Dunlop published scientific papers in the Monthly Notices of the Royal Astronomical Society, the Edinburgh Journal of Science, and the Transactions of the Royal Society.

== Observations and discoveries in Australia ==
Dunlop made several noteworthy discoveries in the Southern Hemisphere sky and in 1828 published A Catalogue of Nebulae and Clusters of Stars in the Southern Hemisphere observed in New South Wales, which contains 629 objects. A little more than half the objects he discovered proved to be real, most being small nebulous objects being probably artificially created from the handmade reflecting telescope he had constructed himself. He found many new open star clusters, globular clusters, bright nebulae and planetary nebulae, most previously unknown to visual observers. His most famous discovery is likely the radio galaxy NGC 5128 or Centaurus A, a well-known starburst galaxy in the constellation of Centaurus.

Dunlop's other major observational work was of 256 southern double stars or "pairs" below the declination of about 30° South. These were listed in Approximate Places of Double Stars in the Southern Hemisphere, observed at Paramatta in New South Wales, published in 1829. Many of these pairs were actual new discoveries, though the most northerly of them had been earlier discoveries made by other observers. These double star observations were all made roughly between December 1827 and December 1828, being observed through his homemade 9-foot 23 cm (9-inch) speculum Newtonian reflector, or by measuring the separated distances and position angles of selected double stars using the small 8.0 centimetres (3.1 in) equatorial mounted refracting telescope.

Most of these pairs have proved to be uninteresting to astronomers, and many of the double stars selected were too wide for the indication of orbital motion as binary stars. It seems these observations were made when the atmospheric conditions were quite unsuitable for looking at deep sky objects, either being made under unsteady astronomical seeing or when the sky was illuminated by the bright moon. John Herschel immediately on arrival in South Africa in 1834 and 1835 re-observed all of the James Dunlop's double stars, but had troubles identifying them or finding significant differences in the measured positions of the stars. He first began with Alpha Crucis / Acrux, the brightest star in the constellation of Crux, also commonly known as the Southern Cross, then systematically searched for all the others.

Herschel also was first to designate all the Dunlop double stars to begin with the Greek letter "Δ", which persists in many amateur observational references. Hence, bright southern doubles like p Eridani is known as Δ5, Gamma Crucis / Gacrux is Δ124, etc. Modern double star observers have since discarded this designation and prefer the observer abbreviation "DUN", as first adopted in the Washington Double Star Catalog (WDS) as maintained by the US Naval Observatory in Washington, D.C. Hence, p Eridani is DUN 5, Gamma Crucis / Gacrux is DUN 124, etc.

== Death ==
Dunlop died on 22 September 1848 at Boora Boora near Gosford in New South Wales.

He is buried within the grounds of St. Paul's Anglican Church in Kincumber, New South Wales.

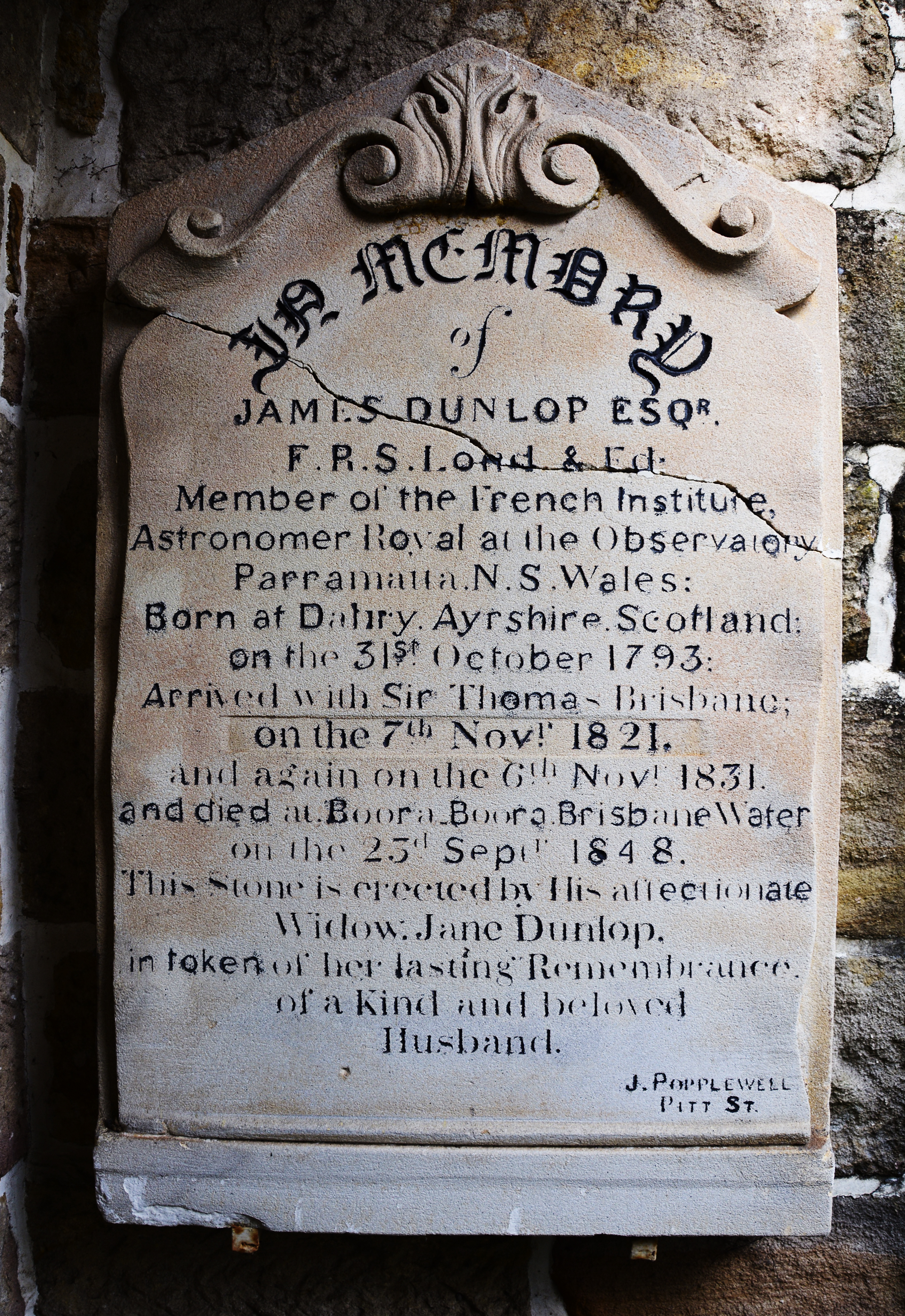
The headstone of James Dunlop (1793–1848) at St. Paul's Anglican Church, Kincumber, New South Wales, Australia

== Publications ==
- A catalogue of nebulae and clusters of stars in the southern hemisphere, observed at Parramatta in New South Wales. Philosophical Transactions of the Royal Society, Vol. 118, pp. 113–151, 1828. This catalogue with descriptions contains 629 southern deep-sky objects.
- He also discovered and catalogued 256 southern double stars in "Approximate Places of Double Stars in the Southern Hemisphere, observed at Paramatta in New South Wales.", which was published in the Memoirs of the Royal Astronomical Society Mem.Ast.Soc.London, Vol. 3, 257, 1829.
- Only five other astronomical papers were published by James Dunlop between 1829 and 1839, the most significant being on comets; "Places of Encke's comet, from 30 observations. Monthly Notices of the Royal Astronomical Society (MNRAS)., Vol. 1, 120 (1829) and "Observation of a small comet at Paramatta. Monthly Notices of the Royal Astronomical Society (MNRAS)., Vol. 1, 130 (1829)
