= List of stars in Horologium =

This is the list of notable stars in the constellation Horologium, sorted by decreasing brightness.

Name	B	Var	HD	HIP	RA	Dec	vis. mag.	abs. mag.	Dist. (ly)	Sp. class	Notes
α Hor	α		26967	19747	04^{h} 14^{m} 00.08^{s}	−42° 17′ 37.9″	3.85	1.07	117	K1III	
R Hor		R	18242	13502	02^{h} 53^{m} 52.90^{s}	−49° 53′ 25″	4.7		1004	M7IIIe	Mira variable, V_{max} = 4.7^{m}, V_{min} = 14.3^{m}, P = 407.6 d
δ Hor	δ		26612	19515	04^{h} 10^{m} 50.43^{s}	−41° 59′ 37.5″	4.93	1.28	175	A9V	
β Hor	β		18866	13884	02^{h} 58^{m} 47.77^{s}	−64° 04′ 16.7″	4.98	0.07	313	A5III	
μ Hor	μ		19319	14240	03^{h} 03^{m} 36.90^{s}	−59° 44′ 15.4″	5.12	1.99	138	F0IV	
ζ Hor	ζ		16920	12484	02^{h} 40^{m} 39.58^{s}	−54° 32′ 59.7″	5.21	1.77	159	F4IV	
ν Hor	ν		17848	13141	02^{h} 49^{m} 01.37^{s}	−62° 48′ 23.7″	5.25	1.73	165	A2V	Has a debris disk
η Hor	η		16555	12225	02^{h} 37^{m} 24.26^{s}	−52° 32′ 35.1″	5.30	2.06	145	A6V	
HD 27588	ψ (Note: Labelled Psi Horologii (ψ Hor/ψ Horologii) by Bode in his Uranographia Ioannis Elerte Bode uranographia)		27588	20161	04^{h} 19^{m} 16.65^{s}	−44° 16′ 04.2″	5.33	1.08	231	K2III	
λ Hor	λ		15233	11258	02^{h} 24^{m} 53.99^{s}	−60° 18′ 41.9″	5.36	1.91	160	F2III	
ι Hor	ι		17051	12653	02^{h} 42^{m} 33.16^{s}	−50° 48′ 03.0″	5.40	4.22	56	G3IV	has a planet (b)
HD 22231			22231	16509	03^{h} 32^{m} 34.72^{s}	−50° 22′ 43.9″	5.67	0.80	307	K3III	suspected variable
TW Hor	σ^{2} (Note: Labelled Sigma^{2} Horologii (σ^{2} Hor/σ^{2} Horologii) by Bode in his Uranographia Ioannis Elerte Bode uranographia)	TW	20234	14930	03^{h} 12^{m} 33.14^{s}	−57° 19′ 17.7″	5.71	−2.32	1315	C5II	semiregular variable, V_{max} = 5.52^{m}, V_{min} = 5.95^{m}, P = 270.3 d
HD 23719			23719	17534	03^{h} 45^{m} 15.88^{s}	−47° 21′ 34.0″	5.72	0.47	365	K1III	
γ Hor	γ		17504	12871	02^{h} 45^{m} 27.45^{s}	−63° 42′ 16.3″	5.73	2.03	179	G8III/IV	
HD 14641			14641	10871	02^{h} 19^{m} 54.25^{s}	−55° 56′ 41.4″	5.81	−0.38	564	K5III	variable star, ΔV = 0.09^{m}, P = 5.37548 d
HD 20640			20640	15305	03^{h} 17^{m} 26.60^{s}	−47° 45′ 06.3″	5.84	0.03	473	K2III	
HD 24706	υ^{1} (Note: Labelled Upsilon^{1} Horologii (υ^{1} Hor/υ^{1} Horologii) by Bode in his Uranographia Ioannis Elerte Bode uranographia)		24706	18199	03^{h} 53^{m} 33.30^{s}	−46° 53′ 36.9″	5.93	0.72	360	K3III	
TU Hor		TU	21981	16339	03^{h} 30^{m} 36.90^{s}	−47° 22′ 30.6″	5.98	0.70	370	A2V	rotating ellipsoidal variable, V_{max} = 5.9^{m}, V_{min} = 6.04^{m}, P = 0.935971 d
HD 18185			18185	13387	02^{h} 52^{m} 18.95^{s}	−62° 54′ 34.6″	6.03	−0.12	553	K1III	
HD 19948	ο (Note: Labelled Omicron Horologii (ο Hor/ο Horologii) by Bode in his Uranographia Ioannis Elerte Bode uranographia)		19948	14749	03^{h} 10^{m} 27.24^{s}	−48° 44′ 02.7″	6.11	0.73	388	K1III	
HD 17254	θ (Note: Appeared in Bode’s Uranographia Ioannis Elerte Bode uranographia) (Note: This designation was dropped by Francis Baily)		17254	12775	02^{h} 44^{m} 10.60^{s}	−52° 34′ 14.0″	6.15	0.68	404	A2V	
HD 18265			18265	13518	02^{h} 54^{m} 06.47^{s}	−50° 52′ 17.1″	6.22	−1.45	1113	K4III	suspected variable
HD 17326			17326	12717	02^{h} 43^{m} 26.47^{s}	−66° 42′ 50.6″	6.23	2.55	178	F5V	
HD 16170			16170	11925	02^{h} 33^{m} 54.62^{s}	−51° 05′ 36.6″	6.24	2.60	174	F6V	
HD 15646			15646	11479	02^{h} 28^{m} 04.34^{s}	−64° 17′ 59.2″	6.35	0.99	385	A0V	
HD 26927			26927	19721	04^{h} 13^{m} 35.71^{s}	−40° 21′ 28.2″	6.36	−1.07	1000	K3III	
TZ Hor		TZ	15379	11293	02^{h} 25^{m} 26.48^{s}	−66° 29′ 38.5″	6.39	−0.86	921	M5III	semiregular variable, ΔV = 0.11^{m}
HD 21011			21011	15655	03^{h} 21^{m} 33.43^{s}	−47° 46′ 35.9″	6.40	0.68	453	K0III	
HD 18292	κ		18292	13429	02^{h} 52^{m} 54.65^{s}	−65° 27′ 18.9″	6.47	0.71	463	K0/K1III	
HD 23670			23670	17493	03^{h} 44^{m} 50.47^{s}	−48° 03′ 40.0″	6.49	0.53	508	G8/K0III	
HD 21360	ρ (Note: Labelled Rho Horologii (ρ Hor/ρ Horologii) by Bode in his Uranographia Ioannis Elerte Bode uranographia)		21360	15884	03^{h} 24^{m} 36.21^{s}	−51° 03′ 45.7″	6.50	0.87	435	A0V	
HD 23308			23308	17298	03^{h} 42^{m} 09.92^{s}	−45° 57′ 28.5″	6.50	3.52	128	F8V	
HD 20037	σ^{1} (Note: Labelled Sigma^{1} Horologii (σ^{1} Hor/σ^{1} Horologii) by Bode in his Uranographia Ioannis Elerte Bode uranographia)		20037	14765	03^{h} 10^{m} 39.24^{s}	–57° 48′ 35.3″	6.63		545	G8III	
HD 16226	ε		16626	11900	02^{h} 33^{m} 33^{s}	–62° 35′ 12″	6.77	–0.76	1045	B9V	
HD 27019	φ (Note: Labelled Phi Horologii (φ Hor/φ Horologii) by Bode in his Uranographia Ioannis Elerte Bode uranographia)		27019	19758	04^{h} 14^{m} 09.55^{s}	–46° 07′ 56.0″	6.77		147	F8/G0V	
HD 24805	υ^{2} (Note: Labelled Upsilon^{2} Horologii (υ^{2} Hor/υ^{2} Horologii) by Bode in his Uranographia Ioannis Elerte Bode uranographia)		24805	18286	03^{h} 54^{m} 37.50^{s}	–46° 25′ 00.7″	6.90		293	A3V	
HD 25245	τ (Note: Labelled Tau Horologii (τ Hor/τ Horologii) by Bode in his Uranographia Ioannis Elerte Bode uranographia)		25245	18554	03^{h} 58^{m} 15.22^{s}	–49° 36′ 36.3″	6.94		580	K0III	
HD 27631			27631	20199	04^{h} 19^{m} 45^{s}	−41° 57′ 37″	8.25		148	G3IV	has a planet (b)
WASP-120					04^{h} 10^{m} 28.0^{s}	−45° 53′ 54″	11			F5	has a transiting planet (b)
GJ 1061					03^{h} 35^{m} 59.64^{s}	−44° 30′ 46.2″	13.03		12	M5.5	nearby red dwarf
WW Hor		WW			02^{h} 36^{m} 11.45^{s}	−52° 19′ 13.5″	17.6				AM Her variable and eclipsing binary, V_{max} = 17.6^{m}, V_{min} = 21.6^{m}, P = 0.080199046 d
Table legend: • Name = Proper name • B = Bayer designation • F or/and G. = Flamsteed designation or Gould designation • Var = Variable star designation • HD = Henry Draper Catalogue designation number • HIP = Hipparcos Catalogue designation number • RA = Right ascension for the Epoch/Equinox J2000.0 • Dec = Declination for the Epoch/Equinox J2000.0 • vis. mag. = visual magnitude (m or m_{v}), also known as apparent magnitude • abs. mag. = absolute magnitude (M_{v}) • Dist. (ly) = Distance in light-years from Earth • Sp. class = Spectral class of the star in the stellar classification system • Notes = Common name(s) or alternate name(s); comments; notable properties [for example: multiple star status, range of variability if it is a variable star, exoplanets, etc.]

== See also ==
- List of stars by constellation
