= NGC 1527 =

Galaxy in the constellation Horologium

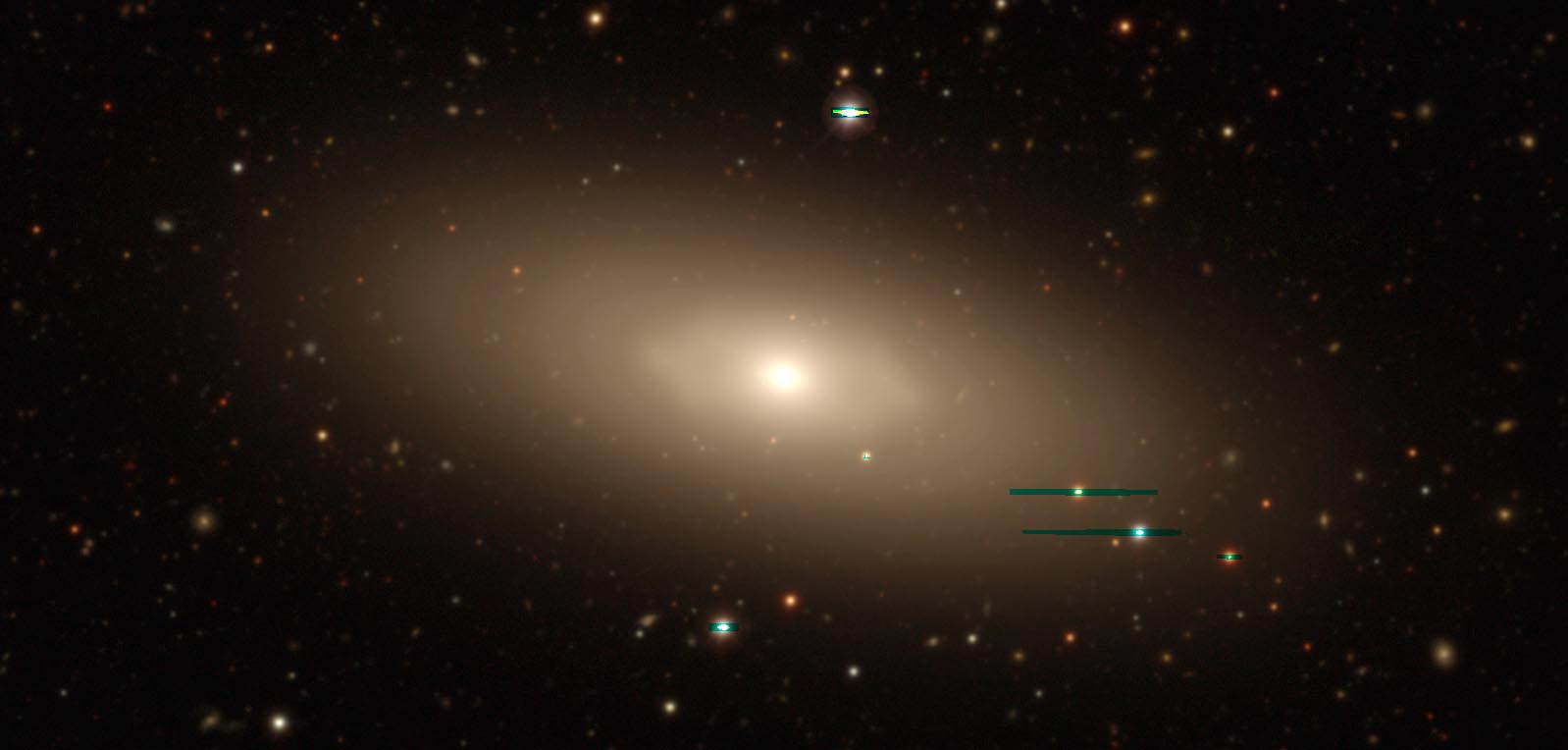
- NGC 1527 imaged by Legacy Surveys

Observation data (J2000 epoch)
- Constellation: Horologium
- Right ascension: 04^{h} 08^{m} 24.1044^{s}
- Declination: −47° 53′ 48.811″
- Redshift: 0.004043±0.0000570
- Heliocentric radial velocity: 1,212±17 km/s
- Distance: 55.87 ± 3.62 Mly (17.130 ± 1.111 Mpc)
- Group or cluster: [CHM2007] HDC 257
- Apparent magnitude (V): 11.74

Characteristics
- Type: SA(r)0^0
- Size: ~96,100 ly (29.47 kpc) (estimated)
- Apparent size (V): 3.7′ × 1.4′

Other designations
- ESO 201- G 020, 2MASX J04082413-4753493, PGC 14526

NGC 1527 is a lenticular galaxy in the constellation of Horologium. Its velocity with respect to the cosmic microwave background is 1,178±17 km/s, which corresponds to a Hubble distance of 56.7 ± 4.1 Mly (17.37 ± 1.27 Mpc). Additionally, 10 non-redshift measurements give a mean distance of 55.87 ± 3.62 Mly (17.130 ± 1.111 Mpc). It was discovered by Scottish astronomer James Dunlop on 28 September 1826.

NGC 1527 has a possible active galactic nucleus, i.e. it has a compact region at the center of a galaxy that emits a significant amount of energy across the electromagnetic spectrum, with characteristics indicating that this luminosity is not produced by the stars.

== Galaxy group ==
NGC 1527 is a member of a galaxy group known as HDC 257. The group contains at least 14 galaxies, including NGC 1433, NGC 1483, NGC 1487, NGC 1493, NGC 1494, NGC 1495, NGC 1510, NGC 1512, IC 1959, IC 2000 (galaxy), ESO 201-14, and two others.

== Supernova ==
One supernova has been observed in NGC 1527:

- SN 2008ge (Type Iax, mag. 12.8) was discovered by The CHilean Automatic Supernova sEarch (CHASE) on 8 October 2008. It reached magnitude 12.2, making it the brightest supernova of 2008. It was initially classified as Type Ia, but later analysis concluded that it was Type Iax.

== See also ==
- List of NGC objects (1001–2000)
