= Horologium in Chinese astronomy =

Constellation

According to traditional Chinese uranography, the modern constellation Horologium is located within the western quadrant of the sky, which is symbolized as The White Tiger of the West (西方白虎, Xī Fāng Bái Hǔ)

The name of the western constellation in modern Chinese is 時鐘座 (shí zhōng zuò), meaning "the clock constellation".

== Stars ==
The map of Chinese constellation in constellation Horologium area consists of :

Four Symbols	Mansion (Chinese name)	Romanization	Translation	Asterisms (Chinese name)	Romanization	Translation	Western star name	Chinese star name	Romanization	Translation
White Tiger of the West (西方白虎)	畢	Bì	Net	天園	Tiānyuán	Celestial Orchard	α Hor	天園增六	Tiānyuánzēngliù	6th additional star

== See also ==
- Traditional Chinese star names
- Chinese constellations
