= Iota Horologii =

Star in the constellation Horologium

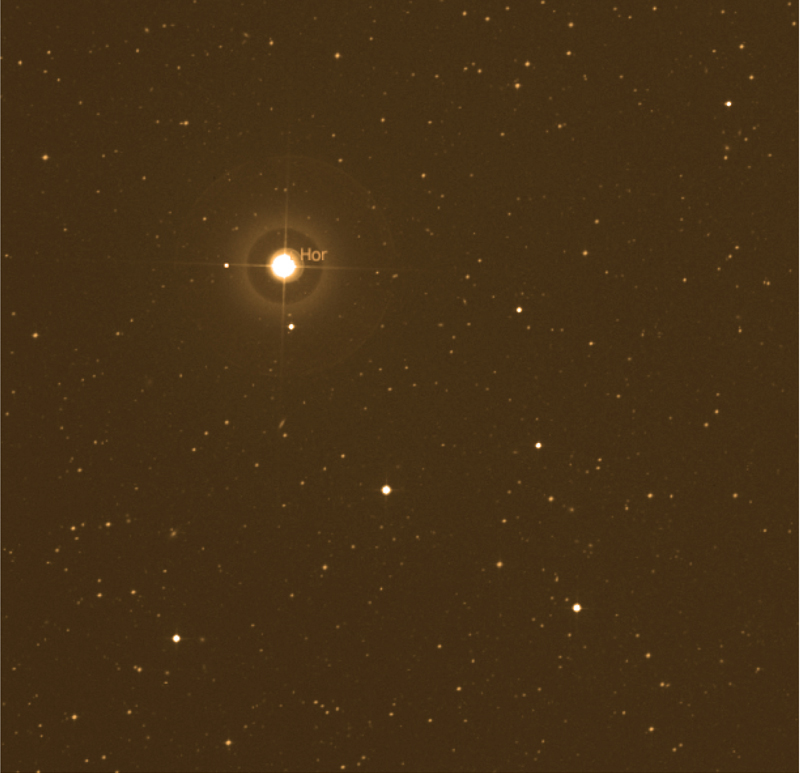
- Credit: Digital Sky Survey/VirGO

Observation data Epoch J2000.0 Equinox ICRS
- Constellation: Horologium
- Right ascension: 02^{h} 42^{m} 33.46667^{s}
- Declination: −50° 48′ 01.0551″
- Apparent magnitude (V): +5.40

Characteristics
- Evolutionary stage: Main sequence
- Spectral type: G0Vp
- B−V color index: 0.57

Astrometry
Radial velocity (R_{v})	16.94±0.12 km/s
Proper motion (μ)	RA: 333.716(35) mas/yr Dec.: 219.423(42) mas/yr
Parallax (π)	57.6131±0.0383 mas
Distance	56.61 ± 0.04 ly (17.36 ± 0.01 pc)
Absolute magnitude (M_{V})	+4.23

Details
Mass	1.21±0.01 M_{☉}
Radius	1.16±0.04 R_{☉}
Luminosity	1.64±0.05 L_{☉}
Surface gravity (log g)	4.53±0.03 cgs
Temperature	6,207±16 K
Metallicity [Fe/H]	+0.180±0.012 dex
Rotation	4.802±0.074 days
Rotational velocity (v sin i)	6.0±0.5 km/s
Age	480±360 Myr

Other designations
- ι Hor, GJ 108, HD 17051, HIP 12653, HR 810, 2MASS J02423346-5048008

Database references
SIMBAD	data
Exoplanet Archive	data

Iota Horologii, Latinized from ι Horologii, is a star in the southern constellation Horologium. With an apparent magnitude of +5.40, it can be seen by the naked eye only from places not affected by light pollution. Based on parallax measurements, it lies 56.5 light-years away.

With a spectral type of G0Vp, this is a G-dwarf star, like the Sun, currently fusing hydrogen atoms into helium. It has previously been classified as G3 and a subgiant [IV]. It has 1.21 times the mass of the Sun and 1.16 times the radius. Iota Horologii shines with 1.64 times the Sun's energy output from its photosphere, whose effective temperature is 6,200 K. At this temperature, Iota Horologii has the yellow-white hue typical of early G-type stars. Its age is about one-tenth as that of the Sun, 480 million years, albeit with a large margin of error of 75%.

In 1999, a planet of the star was discovered. Because the planet orbits in a near Earth orbit, Iota Horologii was ranked 69th in the list of candidates for NASA's planned Terrestrial Planet Finder mission. In 2000, a dust disc was announced around the star, but this was later determined to be an instrumental artifact.

== Distance and visibility ==
Since Iota Horologii is in the minor constellation of Horologium and is quite dim in the sky, it has not been given a traditional name. It lies roughly between the stars Eta Horologii and R Horologii (though it is not close to them in real space).

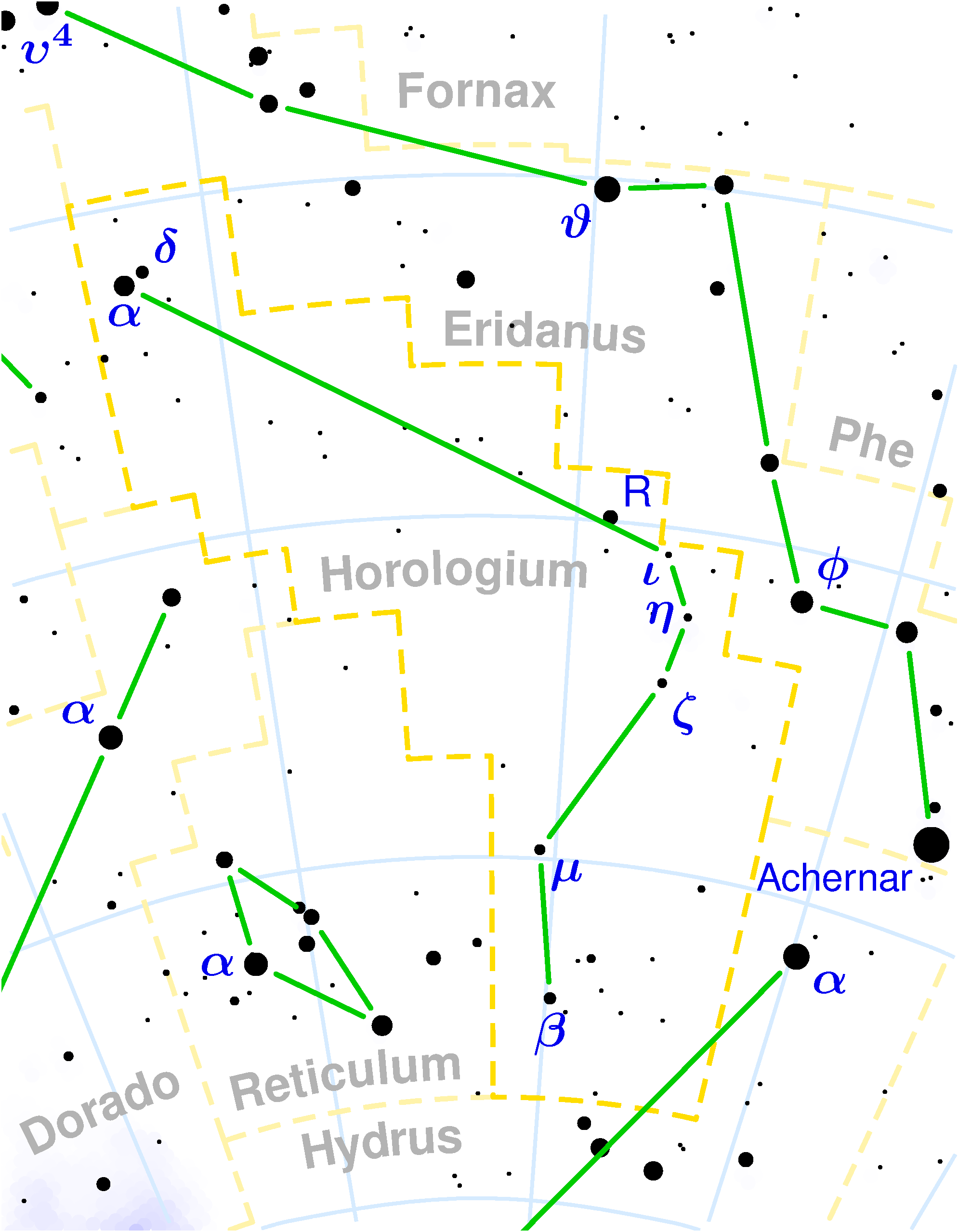
Location of Iota (ι) Horologii (circled)

In its current position, Iota Horologii's closest neighbor is Chi Eridani, approximately 7 light-years away from it. The closest planetary systems to Iota Horologii are HD 10647, a G dwarf at 9.5 ly, and Epsilon Reticuli, an orange subgiant at 16 ly. Other star systems close to Iota Horologii include Nu Phoenicis (~16 ly) and Zeta Reticuli (~20 ly).

== Properties ==
Iota Horologii was once believed to have formed together with the stars of the Hyades cluster (~625 million years ago) but must have slowly drifted away, being presently more than 130 light-years away from its original birthplace. The metallicity of the star matches the abundances found in the Hyades, indicating that the metals (elements heavier than helium) in the atmosphere were not acquired because it engulfed planetary material. However, a 2018 study found that the abundance of lithium in the star is half of that of Hyades members, and their modelling of Iota Horologii's orbit around the galaxy suggest the star did not form in the cluster. As of such, it is unlikely the star is part of the Hyades cluster.

Measurements of magnetic activity with the 1.5 m telescope at Cerro Tololo Inter-American Observatory show that the star has a 1.6 year magnetic activity cycle which, as of 2010, is the shortest cycle measured so far for a solar like star. The sun by comparison has an 11-year magnetic activity cycle. There may be a second, longer cycle which modulates the 1.6 year cycle.

== Planetary system ==
Iota Horologii b is believed to be Jupiter-sized. The planet's discovery was the result of a survey of forty stars that began in November 1992.

Stability analysis reveals that the orbits of Earth-sized planets located in the planet's trojan points would be stable for long periods of time.

Based on residuals in the radial velocity curve, a planet in an eccentric orbit with a period of approximately 600 days was proposed, but this was not confirmed and it seems likely that the effect was due to activity on Iota Horologii itself.

An astrometric measurement of the planet's inclination and true mass was published in 2022 as part of Gaia DR3.

The Iota Horologii planetary system
Companion (in order from star)	Mass	Semimajor axis (AU)	Orbital period (days)	Eccentricity	Inclination (°)	Radius
b	6.2±0.5 M_{J}	0.96±0.05	307.755±0.049	0.35806±0.00014	87±6	—

== See also ==
- HD 209458 and 47 Ursae Majoris, other solar-type stars with exoplanets discovered almost at the same period.
- List of exoplanets discovered before 2000 - Iota Horologii b
