= Phi Eridani =

Blue-hued star in the constellation Eridanus

φ Eridani
- Location of φ Eridani (circled in red)

Observation data Epoch J2000.0 Equinox J2000.0 (ICRS)
- Constellation: Eridanus
- Right ascension: 02^{h} 16^{m} 30.58563^{s}
- Declination: −51° 30′ 43.7955″
- Apparent magnitude (V): 3.55

Characteristics
- Spectral type: B8IV-V
- U−B color index: −0.38
- B−V color index: −0.12

Astrometry
| Radial velocity (R_{v}) | 10.40 km/s |
| Proper motion (μ) | RA: +91.03 mas/yr Dec.: −22.23 mas/yr |
| Parallax (π) | 21.22±0.12 mas |
| Distance | 153.7 ± 0.9 ly (47.1 ± 0.3 pc) |
| Absolute magnitude (M_{V}) | 0.183±0.027 |

Details
| Mass | 3.55 M_{☉} |
| Radius | 2.422 R_{☉} |
| Luminosity | 135 L_{☉} |
| Surface gravity (log g) | 4.21±0.14 cgs |
| Temperature | 12,650 K |
| Rotation | 0.343705 d |
| Rotational velocity (v sin i) | 250 km/s |
| Age | 44 Myr |

Other designations
- φ Eri, CPD−52°285, FK5 82, HD 14228, HIP 10602, HR 674, SAO 232696

Database references
| SIMBAD | data |

φ Eridani (Latinised as Phi Eridani) is a star in the constellation Eridanus. It is visible to the naked eye with an apparent visual magnitude of 3.55. The distance to this star, as determined using the parallax method, is around 154 light-years.

This is a B-type star with a stellar classification of B8IV-V, suggesting it shows traits of a main-sequence star and a subgiant. It is spinning rapidly with a projected rotational velocity of 250 km/s. This rotation is giving the star an oblate shape with an equator that is 17% larger than the polar radius. It has 3.55 times the mass of the Sun and radiates 135 times the solar luminosity from its outer atmosphere at an effective temperature of about 12,650 K.

Phi Eridani may form a wide binary star system with a 9th-magnitude star at lies an angular separation of 86″. This companion is a G-type main-sequence star with a stellar classification of G2V. It may also have a physical association with the naked-eye star Eta Horologii. It is a member of the Tucana-Horologium association, a 45(±4)-Myr-old group of stars that share a common motion through space.
