= NGC 1252 =

Possible open cluster remnant in Horologium

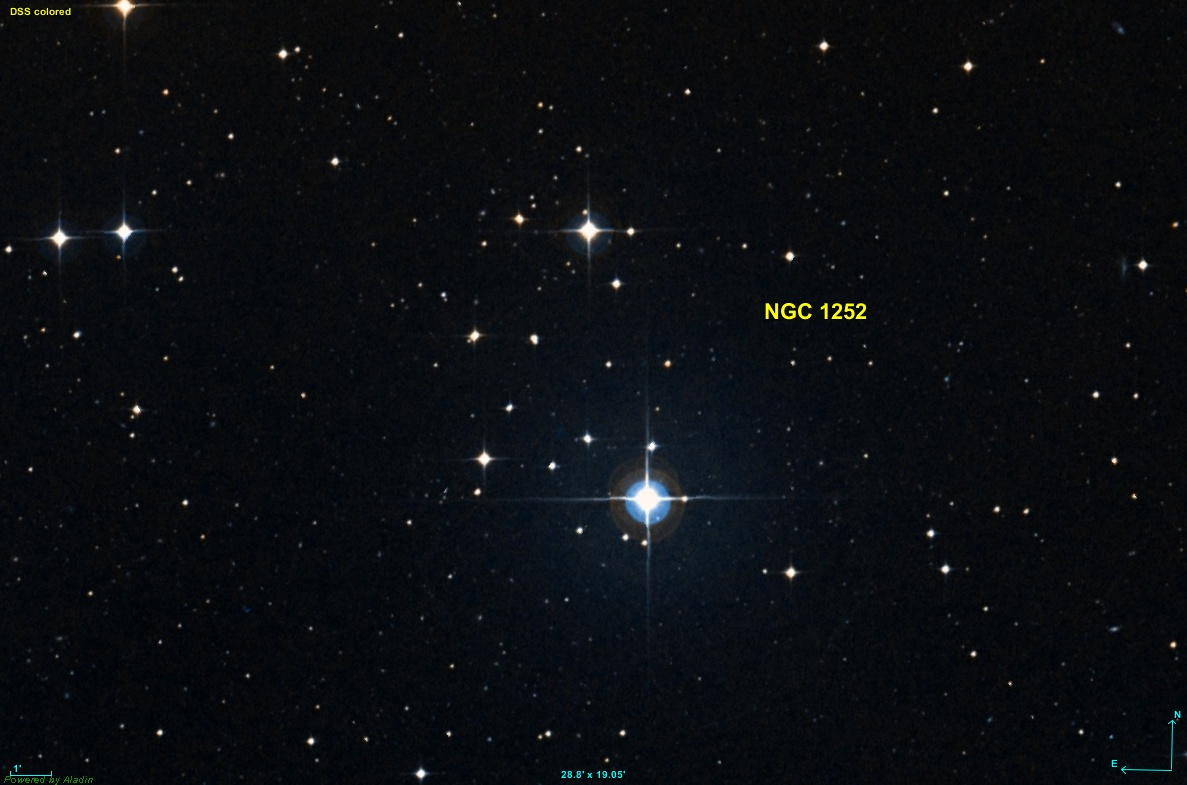
- NGC 1252 as observed by the Digitized Sky Survey

Observation data (J2000 epoch)
- Right ascension: 03^{h} 10^{m} 47^{s}
- Declination: −57° 45′ 18″
- Distance: 2,100 ly (640 pc) (Note: Estimates range from ~1,500 ly (470 pc) (Bouchet and Thé 1983) to ~2,600 ly (790 pc) (Pavani and Bica 2007); see text for a more complete discussion.)
- Apparent magnitude (V): 12.58 (Note: Average of the 13 stars that de la Fuente Marcos et al. include as members.)
- Apparent dimensions (V): 7.2″

Physical characteristics
- Radius: ~13 ly (4.0 pc)
- Estimated age: 3000.00±1000.00 Ma
- Other designations: ESO 116-11

Associations
- Constellation: Horologium
- Galaxy: Milky Way

NGC 1252 is a metal-poor, possible open cluster or open cluster remnant located in the constellation Horologium, containing around 20 stars. Discovered in 1834 by John Herschel, it was described by John Louis Emil Dreyer as an 8th-magnitude star surrounded by a group of 18 or 20 stars. Stars TW Horologii and HD 20286 were once considered to be part of NGC 1252, but this is now not likely.

Due to the nature of the object, it has been given different classifications: according to Bouchet & Thé (1983), it is an open cluster at around 500 million years old located 470 parsecs (1,500 ly) away, with a diameter of 8 parsecs (26 ly), while Baumgardt (1998) found it to be an asterism. Pavani, Bica, and Dutra et al. (2001) put the age at 3 billion years old and distance at 1,000 parsecs (3,300 ly). It is also approximately 900 parsecs (2,900 ly) below the galactic disc.

Two structures are located nearby: the Tucana-Horologium association and the Hyades Stream. This proximity is the cause of the debate over NGC 1252's nature.
