= C87 =

C87 or C-87 may refer to:

- Consolidated C-87 Liberator Express
- Ruy Lopez, Closed, Averbach Variation chess openings ECO code
- Freedom of Association and Protection of the Right to Organise Convention, 1948 code
- Caldwell 87 (NGC 1261), a globular cluster in the constellation Horologium
