= Iota Horologii b =

Extrasolar planet in the constellation Horologium

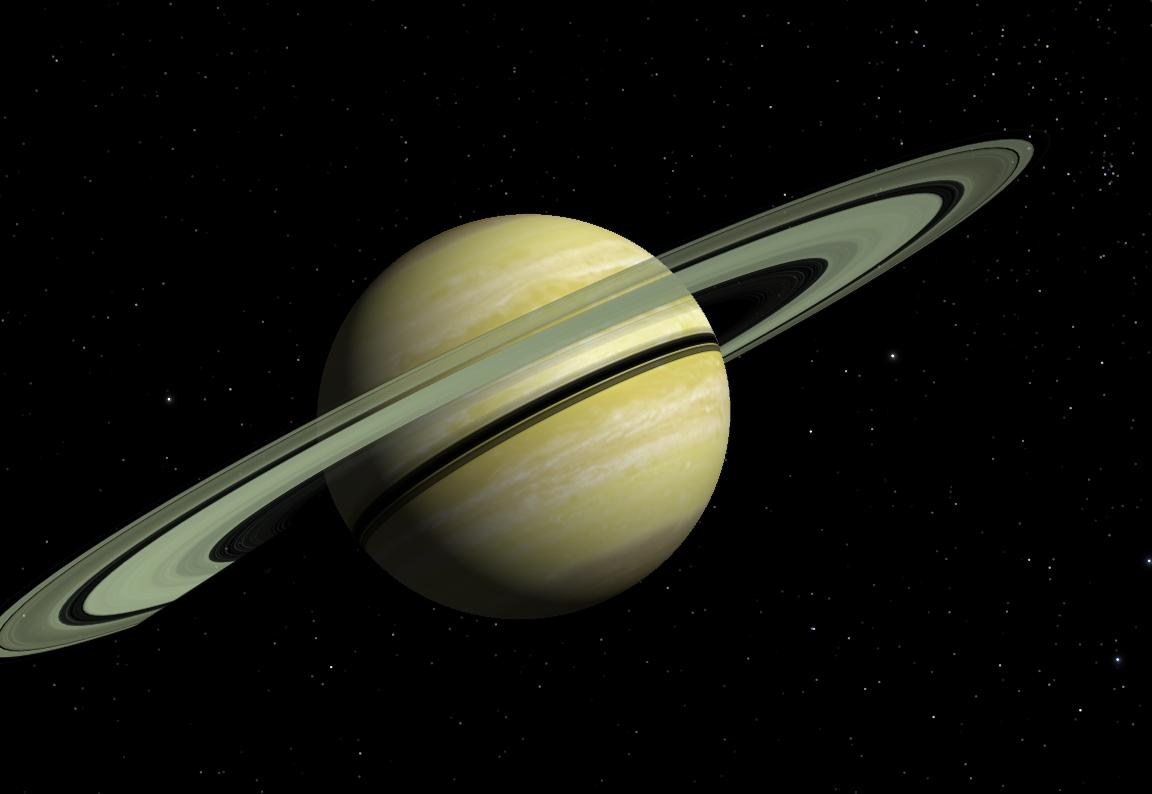
- Artistic rendering of Iota Horologii b with hypothetical rings

Discovery
- Discovered by: Kürster et al.
- Discovery site: La Silla Observatory
- Discovery date: 29 July 1999
- Detection method: Doppler spectroscopy

Orbital characteristics
- Semi-major axis: 0.91 AU (136 million km)
- Eccentricity: 0.22 ± 0.06
- Orbital period (sidereal): 311.3 ± 1.3 d
- Inclination: 87°±6°
- Time of periastron: 2,451,308.8 ± 10.4
- Argument of periastron: 78.9 ± 13.1
- Semi-amplitude: 57.1 ± 5.2
- Star: Iota Horologii

Physical characteristics
- Mass: 6.2±0.5 M_{J}

Iota Horologii b (ι Hor b / ι Horologii b), often catalogued HR 810 b, is an extrasolar planet approximately 56.5 light-years away in the constellation of Horologium (the Pendulum Clock). Iota Horologii b has a minimum mass 2.26 times that of Jupiter; astrometric measurements from Gaia suggest it has a true mass of 6.2 M_{J}.

== Detection and discovery ==
The discovery of Iota Horologii b was the result of a long-term survey of forty Solar analog stars that was begun in November 1992. The planet represents the first discovery of an extrasolar planet with a European Southern Observatory instrument, with the data found at the La Silla Observatory in Chile.

The Keplerian signal found the planet to have an orbital period of 320.1 days, indicative of an orbiting planet with minimum mass of 2.26 Jupiter masses. Iota Horologii b was announced in the summer of 1999 as the first planet found by a team of planet hunters led by Martin Kürster.

The measurements of Iota Horologii show that the planet orbits the star approximately every 320 days. From this period, the known mass of the central star (1.25 solar masses) and the amplitude of the velocity changes, a mass of at least 2.26 times that of planet Jupiter is deduced for the planet.

It revolves around the host star in a somewhat elongated orbit. If it were located in the Solar System, this orbit would stretch from just outside the orbit of Venus (at 117 million km or 0.78 astronomical units [AU] from the Sun) to just outside the orbit of the Earth (at 162 million km or 1.08 AU). Because the planet is about 2,000 times more massive than the Earth, it is predicted that Iota Horologii b is more similar to planet Jupiter.

Preliminary astrometric analysis of Iota Horologii b suggested that planet b may have as much as 24 times the mass of Jupiter with an inclination of 5.5 degrees from Earth's line of sight. With these calculations, Iota Horologii b may actually be an extremely dim brown dwarf and a substellar companion of Iota Horologii. However, these measurements were later proved useful only for upper limits of inclination. An astrometric measurement of the planet's inclination and true mass was published in 2022 as part of Gaia DR3, revealing it to have a planetary mass of 6.2 M_{J}.

== See also ==
- List of exoplanets discovered before 2000
