= Zeta Horologii =

Star in the constellation Horologium

Observation data Epoch J2000.0 Equinox J2000.0 (ICRS)
- Constellation: Horologium
- Right ascension: 02^{h} 40^{m} 39.61286^{s}
- Declination: −54° 32′ 59.6836″
- Apparent magnitude (V): 5.20

Characteristics
- Spectral type: F6 V (F2 V + F5 V)
- B−V color index: +0.42

Astrometry
Radial velocity (R_{v})	5.8 km/s
Proper motion (μ)	RA: +32.86 mas/yr Dec.: +4.96 mas/yr
Parallax (π)	20.37±0.21 mas
Distance	160 ± 2 ly (49.1 ± 0.5 pc)
Absolute magnitude (M_{V})	+1.76

Orbit
Period (P)	12.9274 d
Eccentricity (e)	0.25
Periastron epoch (T)	7.361±0.046
Argument of periastron (ω) (secondary)	78.6±0.13°
Semi-amplitude (K_{1}) (primary)	58.1±1.37 km/s
Semi-amplitude (K_{2}) (secondary)	66.1±1.56 km/s

Details

ζ Hor A
Mass	1.43 M_{☉}
Luminosity	16.7 L_{☉}
Surface gravity (log g)	3.74 cgs
Temperature	6,702 K
Metallicity [Fe/H]	−0.07 dex
Rotational velocity (v sin i)	8.0±1.2 km/s
Age	1.50 Gyr

ζ Hor B
Mass	1.26 M_{☉}

Other designations
- ζ Hor, CPD−55°446, FK5 1076, HD 16920, HIP 12484, HR 802, SAO 232857

Database references
SIMBAD	data

Zeta Horologii, Latinized from ζ Horologii, is a yellow-white-hued binary star system in the southern constellation of Horologium. It is visible to the naked eye with a combined apparent visual magnitude of 5.20. Based upon an annual parallax shift of 20.37 mas as seen from Earth, it is located around 160 light-years from the Sun.

This system was determined to be a double-lined spectroscopic binary by J. H. Moore in 1911−12. The first orbital elements were published by J. Sahade and C. A. Hernández in 1964, who found it consisted of two F-type main-sequence stars of probable stellar classifications F2 V and F5 V. The pair orbit each other with a period of 12.9274 days and an eccentricity of 0.25. The system displays an infrared excess at a wavelength of 24 μm but not at 70 μm, yielding a derived temperature of 260 K. This suggests a circumbinary debris disk orbiting at a distance of less than 4.8 AU from the star system.
