= Research Consortium On Nearby Stars =

The REsearch Consortium On Nearby Stars (RECONS) is an international group of astronomers founded in 1994 to investigate the stars nearest to the Solar System - with a focus on those within 10 parsecs (32.6 light years), but as of 2012 the horizon was stretched to 25 parsecs. In part the project hopes a more accurate survey of local star systems will give a better picture of the star systems in the Galaxy as a whole.

== Notable discoveries ==
The Consortium claims authorship of the series The Solar Neighborhood in The Astronomical Journal, that began in 1994. This series now numbers nearly 40 papers and submissions. The following discoveries are from this series:

- GJ 1061 was discovered to be the 20th nearest known star system, at a distance of 11.9 light years.
- The first accurate measurement of distance for DENIS 0255-4700 . At a distance of 16.2 light years, it is the nearest known class L brown dwarf object to the Solar System.
- The discovery of 20 previously unknown star systems within 10 parsecs of the Solar System. These are in addition to 8 new star systems announced between 2000 and 2005.

RECONS is listed explicitly as an author on papers submitted to the Bulletin of the American Astronomical Society since 2004.

The RECONS web page includes the frequently referenced "List of the 100 nearest star systems". They update this list as discoveries are made. A list of all RECONS parallaxes is available, as are all papers in the solar neighborhood series and which illustrates data from the RECONS 25 Parsec Database.

== Members ==
Key astronomers involved in the project include

- Todd J. Henry (GSU) (consortium founder and director)
- Wei-Chun Jao (GSU)
- John Subasavage (USNO-Flagstaff)
- Charlie Finch (USNO-DC)
- Adric Riedel (Caltech)
- Sergio Dieterich (Carnegie)
- Jennifer Winters (H-S CfA)
- Phil Ianna (UVA).

== See also ==
- List of astronomical societies
- List of nearest stars
