= DENIS 0255−4700 =

Star in the constellation Eridanus

- Location of DENIS 0255−4700 in the constellation Eridanus

Observation data Epoch J2000 Equinox ICRS
- Constellation: Eridanus
- Right ascension: 02^{h} 55^{m} 03.693^{s}
- Declination: −47° 00′ 51.36″
- Apparent magnitude (V): 22.9

Characteristics
- Evolutionary stage: brown dwarf
- Spectral type: L8/L9
- Apparent magnitude (R): ~20.1
- Apparent magnitude (I): ~17.2
- Apparent magnitude (J): ~13.2

Astrometry
Proper motion (μ)	RA: 1,012.445 mas/yr Dec.: −554.031 mas/yr
Parallax (π)	205.4251±0.1857 mas
Distance	15.88 ± 0.01 ly (4.868 ± 0.004 pc)
Absolute magnitude (M_{V})	24.44

Details
Mass	0.0578 M_{☉}
Radius	0.0776 R_{☉}
Luminosity	0.0000154 L_{☉}
Temperature	~1300 K
Rotation	1.7 hours
Rotational velocity (v sin i)	40.8±8.0 km/s
Age	0.3–10 Gyr

Other designations
- GJ 10402, 2MUCD 10158, DENIS-P J025503.3−470049, 2MASS J02550357−4700509, DENIS-P J025503.5−470050, DENIS-P J0255.0−4700, 2MASSI 0255035−470050

Database references
SIMBAD	data

DENIS 0255−4700 is an extremely faint brown dwarf 15.9 light-years (4.9 parsecs) from the Solar System in the southern constellation of Eridanus. It is the closest isolated L-type brown dwarf (no undiscovered L-dwarfs are expected to be closer), and only after the binary Luhman 16. It is also the faintest brown dwarf (with the absolute magnitude of M_{V} = 24.44) having measured visible magnitude. A number of nearer T and Y-type dwarfs are known, specifically WISE 0855−0714, Epsilon Indi B and C, SCR 1845-6357 B, and UGPS 0722−05.

== History of observations ==
DENIS 0255−4700 was identified for the first time as a probable nearby object in 1999. Its proximity to the Solar System was established by the RECONS group in 2006 when its trigonometric parallax was measured. DENIS 0255-4700 has a relatively small tangential velocity of 27.0 ± 0.5 km/s. The discovery of DENIS 0255-4700 was made by a photometric selection (very red I-J color) performed by Xavier Delfosse using the DENIS survey and optical spectroscopic reconnaissance observations obtained with Low-Resolution Imaging Spectrograph at the Keck II telescope in Mauna Kea observatory (Big island of Hawaii) on December 23, 1998, by Eduardo L Martín and colleagues.

== Properties ==
The photospheric temperature of DENIS 0255−4700 is estimated at 1300 K. Its atmosphere in addition to hydrogen and helium contains water vapor, methane and possibly ammonia. The mass of DENIS 0255−4700 lies in the range from 25 to 65 Jupiter masses corresponding to the age range from 0.3 to 10 billion years. The brown dwarf is rotating rapidly with the period of 1.7 hours, and its rotational axis is inclined 40 degrees from the line-of-sight.

== See also ==
- List of nearest stars and brown dwarfs
- List of brown dwarfs
- Research Consortium On Nearby Stars
