= Gamma Horologii =

Star in the constellation Horologium

Observation data Epoch J2000.0 Equinox J2000.0 (ICRS)
- Constellation: Horologium
- Right ascension: 02^{h} 45^{m} 27.47800^{s}
- Declination: −63° 42′ 16.3925″
- Apparent magnitude (V): +5.743

Characteristics
- Spectral type: G8 III/IV
- B−V color index: +0.929

Astrometry
Radial velocity (R_{v})	−18.79±0.16 km/s
Proper motion (μ)	RA: +18.913 mas/yr Dec.: −8.742 mas/yr
Parallax (π)	17.7941±0.0592 mas
Distance	183.3 ± 0.6 ly (56.2 ± 0.2 pc)
Absolute magnitude (M_{V})	+1.99

Details
Radius	5.50+0.11 −0.08 R_{☉}
Luminosity	16.9±0.1 L_{☉}
Surface gravity (log g)	3.18±0.05 cgs
Temperature	4,961±24 K
Metallicity [Fe/H]	−0.26±0.02 dex

Other designations
- γ Hor, CPD−64°196, HD 17504, HIP 12871, HR 833, SAO 248642, WDS J02455-6342A

Database references
SIMBAD	data

γ Horologii, Latinised as Gamma Horologii, is a solitary star in the southern constellation of Horologium. It is just bright enough to be visible to the naked eye as a dim, yellow-hued point of light with an apparent visual magnitude of +5.74. This object is located at a distance of 183 light years from the Sun, but is drifting closer with a radial velocity of −19 km/s.

The stellar classification of this object is G8 III/IV, matching a G-type star with a luminosity class intermediate between a subgiant and giant star. This suggests it has exhausted the supply of hydrogen at its core and is evolving off the main sequence. It has 5.5 times the radius of the Sun and is radiating 17 times the Sun's luminosity from its swelling photosphere at an effective temperature of 4,961 K. The metallicity is sub-solar, indicating a lower abundance of elements more massive than helium, as compared to the Sun.
