= Todd J. Henry =

American astronomer

Todd Jackson Henry is an American astronomer and Professor of Astronomy at Georgia State University, Atlanta, Georgia. He is founder and director of the Research Consortium On Nearby Stars.

== Education ==
Henry obtained his B.A. in Physics/Planetary Sciences from Cornell University, Ithaca, New York in 1986 and his Ph.D. in Astronomy from University of Arizona, Tucson, Arizona in 1991.

== Work ==
While an undergraduate student at Cornell he became acquainted with the Planetary Scientist Carl Sagan. Henry wrote several papers with Sagan on the organic chemistry in planetary atmospheres between 1985 and 1991. As a graduate student he became interested in the study of nearby stars and wrote his Ph.D. thesis about methods for studying them.

In 1994 he founded the Research Consortium On Nearby Stars (RECONS) to perform concentrated study of stars near the Earth and to search for stars and other objects in nearby interstellar space. He established a series titled The solar neighborhood in The Astronomical Journal that now has over twenty chapters.

He is also an active participant in a number of other projects. He is on the CRIRES team that failed to confirm any planetary companions for the nearby star VB 10.

He was elected a Legacy Fellow of the American Astronomical Society in 2020.

== See also ==
- Research Consortium On Nearby Stars
