= Delta Horologii =

Binary star system in the constellation Horologium

Observation data Epoch J2000.0 Equinox J2000.0 (ICRS)
- Constellation: Horologium
- Right ascension: 04^{h} 10^{m} 50.58927^{s}
- Declination: −41° 59′ 36.8537″
- Apparent magnitude (V): 4.93 (5.15 + 7.29)

Characteristics
- Spectral type: A9 V
- U−B color index: +0.084
- B−V color index: +0.338

Astrometry
Radial velocity (R_{v})	+38.3±2.6 km/s
Proper motion (μ)	RA: +199.08 mas/yr Dec.: +70.18 mas/yr
Parallax (π)	18.24±0.41 mas
Distance	179 ± 4 ly (55 ± 1 pc)
Absolute magnitude (M_{V})	1.50

Orbit
Period (P)	23.80±0.74 yr
Semi-major axis (a)	0.224±0.013″
Eccentricity (e)	0.582±0.014
Inclination (i)	110.6±2.5°
Longitude of the node (Ω)	193.0±1.6°
Periastron epoch (T)	2018.95±0.18
Argument of periastron (ω) (secondary)	284.3±3.5°

Details

δ Hor A
Mass	1.41 M_{☉}
Surface gravity (log g)	3.71±0.14 cgs
Temperature	7,033±239 K
Metallicity [Fe/H]	−0.32 dex
Rotational velocity (v sin i)	220.1±11.0 km/s
Age	768 Myr

δ Hor B
Rotational velocity (v sin i)	51.7±2.6 km/s

Other designations
- δ Hor, CD−42°1400, HD 26612, HIP 19515, HR 1302, SAO 216682, WDS J04108-4200AB

Database references
SIMBAD	data

Delta Horologii (δ Horologii) is a binary star system in the constellation Horologium. It is visible to the naked eye with a combined apparent visual magnitude of 4.93. Based upon an annual parallax shift of 18.24 mas as seen from Earth, it is located 179 ± 4 light years from the Sun.

The two components orbit around each other with a period of 23.8 years and a somewhat high eccentricity of 0.58. The primary, component A, is a magnitude 5.15 A-type main sequence star with a stellar classification of A9 V. At the estimated age of 768 million years, it is spinning rapidly with a projected rotational velocity of 220 km/s, giving the star an oblate shape with an equatorial bulge that is 15% larger than the polar radius. The star has 1.4 times the mass of the Sun.

The secondary has an apparent magnitude of 7.29.
