= Mu Horologii =

Star in the constellation Horologium

Observation data Epoch J2000.0 Equinox J2000.0 (ICRS)
- Constellation: Horologium
- Right ascension: 03^{h} 03^{m} 36.81891^{s}
- Declination: −59° 44′ 15.9925″
- Apparent magnitude (V): 5.11

Characteristics
- Spectral type: F0 III/IV
- B−V color index: +0.34

Astrometry
Radial velocity (R_{v})	17.3±2.8 km/s
Proper motion (μ)	RA: −73.29 mas/yr Dec.: −64.06 mas/yr
Parallax (π)	23.04±0.16 mas
Distance	141.6 ± 1.0 ly (43.4 ± 0.3 pc)
Absolute magnitude (M_{V})	1.99

Details
Mass	1.53+0.08 −0.01 M_{☉}
Luminosity	13 L_{☉}
Surface gravity (log g)	3.80±0.02 cgs
Temperature	6,898±63 K
Metallicity [Fe/H]	−0.42±0.05 dex
Rotational velocity (v sin i)	79.2±4.0 km/s
Age	1.95+0.20 −0.14 Gyr

Other designations
- μ Hor, CPD−60°236, HD 19319, HIP 14240, HR 934, SAO 232981

Database references
SIMBAD	data

Mu Horologii (μ Horologii) is a solitary, yellow-white hued star in the southern constellation of Horologium. It is faintly visible to the naked eye with an apparent visual magnitude of 5.11. Based upon an annual parallax shift of 23.04 mas as seen from Earth, it is located about 141.6 light years from the Sun.

This is an evolving F-type star with a stellar classification of F0 III/IV, showing mixed traits of a subgiant and a giant star. It is around two billion years old with a projected rotational velocity of 79.2 km/s. The star has 1.5 times the mass of the Sun and is radiating 13 times the solar luminosity from its photosphere at an effective temperature of 6,898 K.
