= HD 27631 =

Star in the constellation Horologium

Observation data Epoch J2000.0 Equinox ICRS
- Constellation: Horologium
- Right ascension: 04^{h} 19^{m} 45.46920^{s}
- Declination: −41° 57′ 36.9527″
- Apparent magnitude (V): 8.243±0.012

Characteristics
- Spectral type: G3IV
- B−V color index: 0.721±0.009

Astrometry
Radial velocity (R_{v})	21.04±0.13 km/s
Proper motion (μ)	RA: –41.139 mas/yr Dec.: −91.908 mas/yr
Parallax (π)	19.9263±0.0160 mas
Distance	163.7 ± 0.1 ly (50.18 ± 0.04 pc)
Absolute magnitude (M_{V})	+4.97

Details
Mass	0.944±0.032 M_{☉}
Radius	0.923±0.033 R_{☉}
Luminosity	0.97 L_{☉}
Surface gravity (log g)	4.455±0.038 cgs
Temperature	5,737±36 K
Metallicity [Fe/H]	−0.12±0.05 dex
Rotation	~31 d
Age	4.010±2.892 Gyr

Other designations
- CD−42°1464, HD 27631, HIP 20199, SAO 216753

Database references
SIMBAD	data
Exoplanet Archive	data

HD 27631 is a star with an orbiting exoplanet in the southern constellation of Horologium. It is too faint to be visible to the naked eye, having an apparent visual magnitude of 8.24. The distance to this system is 164 light years based on parallax measurements. It is drifting further away with a radial velocity of 21 km/s.

This is a G-type star with a stellar classification of G3IV, suggesting it is a subgiant star that is evolving off the main sequence after exhausting the supply of hydrogen at its core. It is smaller than the Sun, with 94% of its mass and 92% of the radius. The star is radiating 97% of the luminosity of the Sun from its photosphere at an effective temperature of 5,737 K. The estimated age is roughly 4.4 billion years and it is spinning slowly with a rotation period of around 31 days.

A survey in 2015 has ruled out the existence of any stellar companions at projected distances above 40 astronomical units.

== Planetary system ==
From 1998 to 2012, the star was under observation from the CORALIE echelle spectrograph at La Silla Observatory. In 2012, a long-period, wide-orbiting exoplanet was deduced by radial velocity. This was published in November. In 2023, the inclination and true mass of HD 27631 b were determined via astrometry. This is a super-jovian planet with around 1.6 times the mass of Jupiter. It is orbiting the host star at a separation of 3.22 AU with an eccentricity (ovalness) of 0.16 and an orbital period of six years.

The HD 27631 planetary system
Companion (in order from star)	Mass	Semimajor axis (AU)	Orbital period (years)	Eccentricity	Inclination (°)	Radius
b	1.56+0.2 −0.15 M_{J}	3.22+0.065 −0.064	5.95+0.13 −0.12	0.163±0.057	74+11 −15 or 106+15 −11	—
