= Lambda Horologii =

Star in the constellation Horologium

Observation data Epoch J2000 Equinox ICRS
- Constellation: Horologium
- Right ascension: 02^{h} 24^{m} 53.91034^{s}
- Declination: −60° 18′ 43.0170″
- Apparent magnitude (V): +5.35

Characteristics
- Spectral type: F2III
- B−V color index: +0.39

Astrometry
Radial velocity (R_{v})	+28.34±0.41 km/s
Proper motion (μ)	RA: −71.892 mas/yr Dec.: −131.088 mas/yr
Parallax (π)	21.0119±0.1004 mas
Distance	155.2 ± 0.7 ly (47.6 ± 0.2 pc)
Absolute magnitude (M_{V})	+1.91

Details
Mass	1.76 M_{☉}
Radius	2.74+0.11 −0.16 R_{☉}
Luminosity	13.3±0.1 L_{☉}
Surface gravity (log g)	3.66 cgs
Temperature	6,848 K
Metallicity [Fe/H]	−0.12 dex
Rotational velocity (v sin i)	+140 km/s
Age	1.4 Gyr

Other designations
- λ Hor, CPD−60°199, FK5 84, HD 15233, HIP 11258, HR 714, SAO 248555

Database references
SIMBAD	data

λ Horologii, Latinised as Lambda Horologii, is a star in the southern constellation of Horologium. It is a yellow-white hued star that is dimly visible to the naked eye with an apparent visual magnitude of +5.35. Based upon parallax, this object is located 155 light years distance from the Sun. It is drifting further away with a radial velocity of +28 km/s. Although Eggleton and Tokovinin (2008) list this as a single star, according to Kunzli and North (1998) it may be a binary system with a long orbital period.

The visible component has a stellar classification of F2III, matching an evolved star that has, at the age of 1.4 billion years, become a giant. However, it has just 2.74 times the Sun's radius and shows a high rate of spin with a projected rotational velocity of +140 km/s. The star has 1.76 times the mass of the Sun and is radiating 13 times the Sun's luminosity from its photosphere at an effective temperature of 6,848 K.
