= Beta Horologii =

Star in the constellation Horologium

β Horologii
- Location of β Horologii (circled in red)

Observation data Epoch J2000.0 Equinox J2000.0 (ICRS)
- Constellation: Horologium
- Right ascension: 02^{h} 58^{m} 47.79642^{s}
- Declination: −64° 04′ 16.6250″
- Apparent magnitude (V): 4.979

Characteristics
- Spectral type: A3/5 III(m)
- U−B color index: +0.15
- B−V color index: +0.13
- R−I color index: +0.05

Astrometry
Radial velocity (R_{v})	+23.6±2.8 km/s
Proper motion (μ)	RA: 22.074 ± 0.294 mas/yr Dec.: 5.825 ± 0.287 mas/yr
Parallax (π)	10.4568±0.1427 mas
Distance	312 ± 4 ly (96 ± 1 pc)
Absolute magnitude (M_{V})	+0.20

Details
Radius	1.40 R_{☉}
Luminosity	63 L_{☉}
Temperature	8,303 K
Rotational velocity (v sin i)	115 km/s

Other designations
- β Hor, CPD−64°215, FK5 2212, GC 3611, HD 18866, HIP 13884, HR 909, SAO 248701, PPM 353263

Database references
SIMBAD	data

Beta Horologii, Latinized from β Horologii, is the third-brightest star in the southern constellation of Horologium. It is faintly visible to the naked eye with an apparent visual magnitude of 4.98. Based upon an annual parallax shift of 11.07 mas as seen from Earth, it is located about 295 light years from the Sun. The star is moving away with a radial velocity of +24 km/s.

This is a solitary, A-type giant with a stellar classification of A3/5 III(m). It is a suspected chemically peculiar star of the metallic-line type. Beta Horologii has a relatively high rate of spin with a projected rotational velocity of 115 km/s, giving it an oblate shape with an equatorial bulge that is an estimated 10% wider compared to the polar radius. It has about 1.40 times the radius of the Sun and is radiating 63 times the Sun's luminosity from its photosphere at an effective temperature of 8,303 K.
