= HD 27631 b =

Extrasolar planet in the constellation Horologium

Discovery
- Discovered by: Marmier et al.
- Discovery site: HARPS
- Discovery date: Sept. 13, 2011
- Detection method: Doppler spectroscopy

Orbital characteristics
- Semi-major axis: 3.22+0.065 −0.064 AU
- Eccentricity: 0.163±0.057
- Orbital period (sidereal): 2173+47 −44 d 5.95+0.13 −0.12 yr
- Inclination: 74°+11° −15° or 106°+15° −11°
- Longitude of ascending node: 91°+63° −66°
- Time of periastron: 2456110+158 −147
- Argument of periastron: 128°+28° −27°
- Star: HD 27631

Physical characteristics
- Mass: 1.56+0.2 −0.15 M_{J}

HD 27631 b is an extrasolar planet that has more mass than Jupiter. It orbits 3.25 AU from the star, taking six years to revolve around the parent star HD 27631. Its orbit is eccentric, around 12%. In 2023, the inclination and true mass of HD 27631 b were determined via astrometry.
