= NGC 1510 =

Galaxy in the constellation Horologium

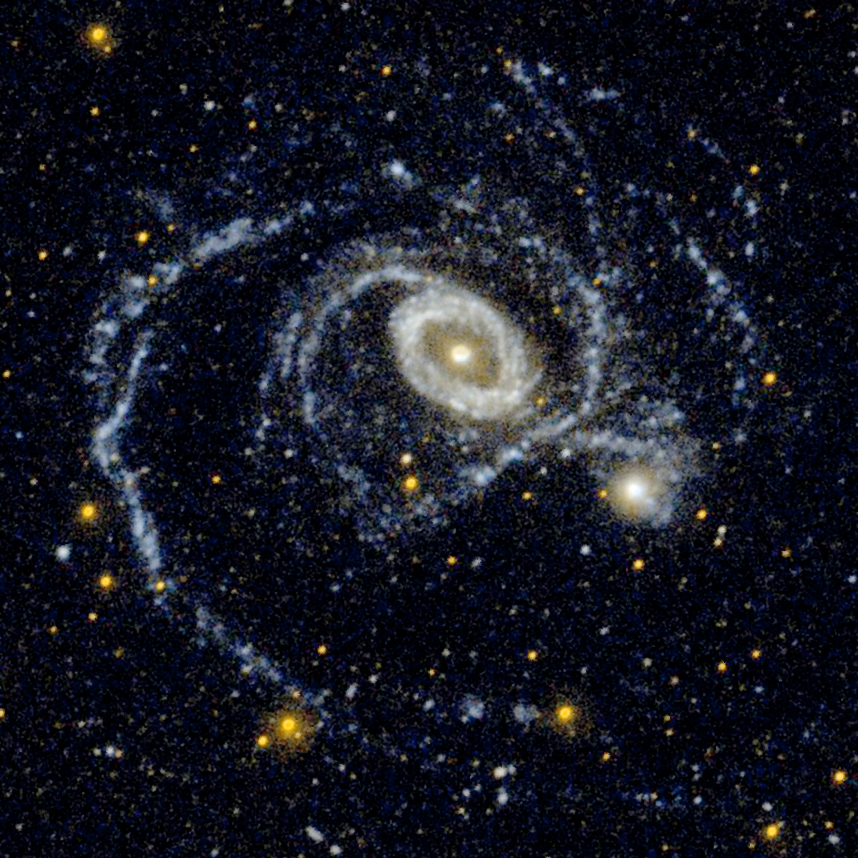
- NGC 1510 sitting slightly southeast of spiral galaxy NGC 1512 (ultraviolet image)

Observation data (J2000.0 epoch)
- Constellation: Horologium
- Right ascension: 04^{h} 03^{m} 32.6^{s}
- Declination: −43° 24′ 00″
- Redshift: 0.003045
- Heliocentric radial velocity: 913 ± 10 km/s
- Distance: 38 Mly (12 Mpc)
- Apparent magnitude (V): 12.40
- Apparent magnitude (B): 13.40
- Magnitude (J): 11.284
- Magnitude (H): 10.167
- Magnitude (K): 10.356

Characteristics
- Type: SA0^0 pec?, BCD
- Apparent size (V): 1.3 x 0.7

Other designations
- PGC 014375, MCG -7-9-6

NGC 1510 is a dwarf lenticular galaxy approximately 38 million light-years away from Earth in the constellation of Horologium. It was discovered by John Herschel on December 4, 1836.

== Gravitational interaction with NGC 1512 ==
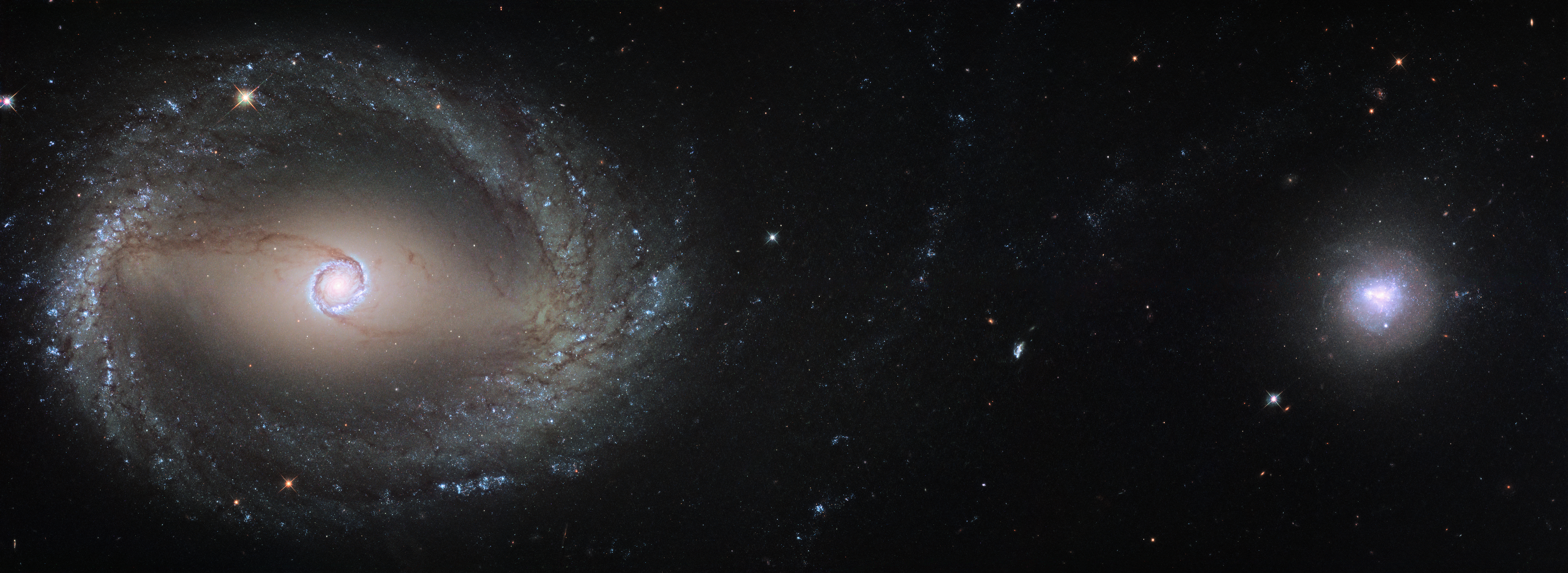
NGC 1512 (left) and NGC 1510 (right)

NGC 1510 is under the influence of gravitational tidal forces of the large neighbour barred spiral galaxy NGC 1512. The two galaxies are separated by only ~5 arcmin (13.8 kpc), and are in the process of a lengthy merger which has been going on for 400 million years. At the end of this process NGC 1512 will have cannibalised its smaller companion.

NGC 1510 is part of a galaxy group known as NGC 1512 group (also known as LGG 108). It consists of at least 3 members, which are NGC 1512 and NGC 1487. It is considered to be one of the filaments around the Fornax-Eridanus Complex.

== See also ==
- Lenticular galaxy
- Dwarf galaxy
- Interacting galaxy
- List of NGC objects (1001–2000)
- Horologium
