= Nu Horologii =

Star in the constellation Horologium

ν Horologii
- Location of ν Horologii (circled)

Observation data Epoch J2000.0 Equinox ICRS
- Constellation: Horologium
- Right ascension: 02^{h} 49^{m} 01.487^{s}
- Declination: −62° 48′ 23.48″
- Apparent magnitude (V): 5.253±0.006

Characteristics
- Evolutionary stage: main sequence
- Spectral type: A2 V
- U−B color index: +0.06
- B−V color index: +0.10

Astrometry
Radial velocity (R_{v})	30.90 km/s
Proper motion (μ)	RA: 94.372 mas/yr Dec.: 28.564 mas/yr
Parallax (π)	19.2611±0.0635 mas
Distance	169.3 ± 0.6 ly (51.9 ± 0.2 pc)
Absolute magnitude (M_{V})	+1.74

Details
Mass	1.90±0.02 M_{☉}
Radius	1.88 R_{☉}
Luminosity	16.7 L_{☉}
Surface gravity (log g)	3.96 cgs
Temperature	8,308 K
Metallicity [Fe/H]	−0.05 dex
Rotational velocity (v sin i)	143.7±1.4 km/s
Age	540±90 Myr

Other designations
- ν Hor, CPD−63°188, FK5 2196, HD 17848, HIP 13141, HR 852, SAO 248656

Database references
SIMBAD	data

Nu Horologii, Latinized from ν Horologii, is a single star in the southern constellation of Horologium. It was catalogued by the Dutch explorer Frederick de Houtman in 1603. With an apparent visual magnitude of 5.3, this star can be seen with the naked eye from the southern hemisphere. (According to the Bortle scale, it can be seen at night from bright suburban skies.) Based upon parallax, Nu Horologii lies at a distance of 169 light-years from Earth. It is receding away from the Sun with a radial velocity of +31 km/s.

== Physical characteristics ==
The stellar classification of A2 V indicates that it is an A-type main sequence star that is generating energy through thermonuclear fusion of hydrogen into helium at its core. Nu Horologii is larger and hotter than the Sun, with 190% of the Sun's mass, 188% of the radius of the Sun, and it shines with 16.7 times the solar luminosity. This is a young star with an estimated age of 540 million years, and it is spinning rapidly with a projected rotational velocity of 144 km/s along the equator. The effective temperature of the photosphere is 8,308 K, giving it the white-hued glow of an A-type star.

== Debris Disk ==
No orbiting companions down to the mass of a brown dwarf have been discovered within a radius of 150 AU of Nu Horologii. However, it is emitting an infrared excess that suggests it is being orbited by a debris disk of dust particles. The mean temperature of this disk is 56 K and it appears to have two components: an inner disk is orbiting at a distance of 96+9
−37 AU, while an outer disk lies 410+24
−96 AU from the star. The estimated mass of the disks is (1.3±0.7)×10^{−3} times the mass of the Earth. The disks may be viewed edge on, which limits the amount of detail that can be discerned.

Based upon their respective motions through space, ν Horologii had a close encounter with the star Alpha Fornacis some 351,200 years ago. The two stars came within 0.081+0.6250
−0.0488 pc of each other; close enough to disrupt their respective (hypothetical) Oort clouds. Potentially, the interaction may have produced asymmetries in the Nu Horologii debris disk, and could cause comet showers that increase the dust content. However, it is unlikely that the encounter was the cause of the disk itself.
