= GJ 1061 =

Red dwarf star in the constellation Horologium

- Location of GJ 1061 in the constellation Horologium

Observation data Epoch J2000 Equinox ICRS
- Constellation: Horologium
- Right ascension: 03^{h} 35^{m} 59.69916^{s}
- Declination: −44° 30′ 45.7308″
- Apparent magnitude (V): 13.03

Characteristics
- Spectral type: M5.5 V
- Apparent magnitude (J): 7.52±0.02
- U−B color index: 1.52
- B−V color index: 1.90

Astrometry
Radial velocity (R_{v})	1.49±0.23 km/s
Proper motion (μ)	RA: 745.654 mas/yr Dec.: −373.323 mas/yr
Parallax (π)	272.1615±0.0316 mas
Distance	11.984 ± 0.001 ly (3.6743 ± 0.0004 pc)
Absolute magnitude (M_{V})	15.26

Details
Mass	0.125±0.003 M_{☉}
Radius	0.152±0.007 R_{☉}
Luminosity (bolometric)	0.001641±0.000037 L_{☉}
Luminosity (visual, L_{V})	0.00007 (Note: Taking the absolute visual magnitude of GJ 1061, $\scriptstyle M_{V_{\ast}} = 15.26$, and the absolute visual magnitude of the Sun, $\scriptstyle M_{V_{\odot}} = 4.83$, the visual luminosity of GJ 1061 can therefore be calculated: $\scriptstyle \frac{L_{V_{\ast}}}{L_{V_{\odot}}} = 10^{0.4\left(M_{V_{\odot}} - M_{V_{\ast}}\right)} = 6.73\times10^{-5}$) L_{☉}
Temperature	2,977+72 −69 K
Metallicity [Fe/H]	−0.03±0.09 dex
Rotation	~125 d
Rotational velocity (v sin i)	<2.5 km/s
Age	>7.0±0.5 Gyr

Other designations
- GJ 1061, L 372-58, LFT 295, LHS 1565, LP 995-46, LTT 1702

Database references
SIMBAD	data
Exoplanet Archive	data
ARICNS	data

GJ 1061 is a red dwarf star located 12 light-years (3.7 parsecs) from Earth in the southern constellation of Horologium. Even though it is a relatively nearby star, it has an apparent visual magnitude of about 13, so it can only be seen with at least a moderately-sized telescope.

This star is a tiny, dim, red dwarf, close to the lower mass limit. It has an estimated mass of about 12.5% that of the Sun and is only about 0.2% as luminous. It is an old, slowly-rotating star, with an age of at least 7 billion years and a rotation period of about 125 days. The star displays no significant infrared excess due to circumstellar dust. It hosts a system of three known exoplanets.

== History of observations ==
The proper motion of GJ 1061 has been known since 1974, but it was estimated to be further away: approximately 25 light-years (7.7 parsecs) distant based upon an estimated parallax of 0.130″. The RECONS accurately determined its distance in 1997. At that time, it was the 20th-nearest known star system to the Sun. The discovery team noted that many more stars like this are likely to be discovered nearby.

== Planetary system ==
On August 13, 2019, a system of three planets was announced orbiting the star GJ 1061 by the Red Dots project for detecting terrestrial planets around nearby red dwarf stars. Since the planets were detected by the radial velocity method, initially only their minimum masses were known. Further observations allowed the true masses to be determined based on gravitational interactions between the planets. (Note: This was previously done for the Gliese 876 and Gliese 581 systems.) All three planets are less than twice the mass of Earth, and so are likely to be rocky planets.

The planet GJ 1061 d orbits in the conservative habitable zone of its star, and the planet GJ 1061 c orbits near the inner edge of the habitable zone. As of 2025, they are the third- and fourth-nearest known terrestrial exoplanets in the habitable zone, after Proxima Centauri b and Ross 128 b. GJ 1061 is a non-variable star that does not suffer flares, so there is a greater probability that the exoplanets still conserve their atmospheres if they had them.

The GJ 1061 planetary system (Note: Data taken from "coplanar, Model D5" solution in Table 4.)
Companion (in order from star)	Mass	Semimajor axis (AU)	Orbital period (days)	Eccentricity	Inclination (°)	Radius
b	1.11+0.11 −0.09 M_{🜨}	0.0210±0.0006	3.2073+0.0002 −0.0003	0.05+0.5 −0.03	~77	—
c	1.81+0.13 −0.11 M_{🜨}	0.0342+0.0009 −0.0010	6.6821±0.0008	0.02+0.03 −0.02	~77	—
d	1.67+0.17 −0.16 M_{🜨}	0.054±0.002	13.066±0.002	0.04+0.04 −0.03	~77	—

=== GJ 1061 c ===
GJ 1061 c is a potentially habitable exoplanet orbiting within the limits of the optimistically defined habitable zone of its red dwarf parent star.

GJ 1061 c is about 81% more massive than the Earth. The planet receives 35% more stellar flux than Earth and has an equilibrium temperature of 275 K (2 °C; 35 °F). Should the atmosphere be of a similar composition to Earth's, the average temperature of the surface would be warmer, at around 34 °C (307 K; 93 °F).

GJ 1061 c orbits its parent star very closely, every 6.7 days at a distance of just 0.035 au, so it is probably tidally locked and in synchronous rotation with its star.

=== GJ 1061 d ===
GJ 1061 d is a potentially habitable exoplanet largely orbiting within the limits of the conservatively defined habitable zone of its parent red dwarf star.

The exoplanet is about 67% more massive than the Earth. The planet receives about 40% less stellar flux than Earth and has an estimated equilibrium temperature of 218 K (−55 °C; −67 °F). The average temperature on the surface would be colder than Earth's and at around 250 K (−23 °C; −10 °F), provided the atmosphere is similar to that of Earth.

GJ 1061 d orbits its star every 13 days, and due to its close-in semi-major axis, it is likely that the exoplanet is tidally locked. However, if the planet's orbit is confirmed to be highly eccentric then this eccentricity could be desynchronising it, enabling the existence of non-synchronised states of equilibrium in its rotation, relative to which side of the planet is facing the star, and thereby it will experience a day/night cycle.

Another solution for this planet gives it a slightly shorter period of 12.4 days and a slightly smaller minimum mass of 1.53 M_{🜨}.

== See also ==
- List of nearest stars and brown dwarfs
- Research Consortium On Nearby Stars
- List of exoplanets discovered in 2020 - GJ 1061 b, c, & d
