= NGC 1512 =

Galaxy in the constellation Horologium

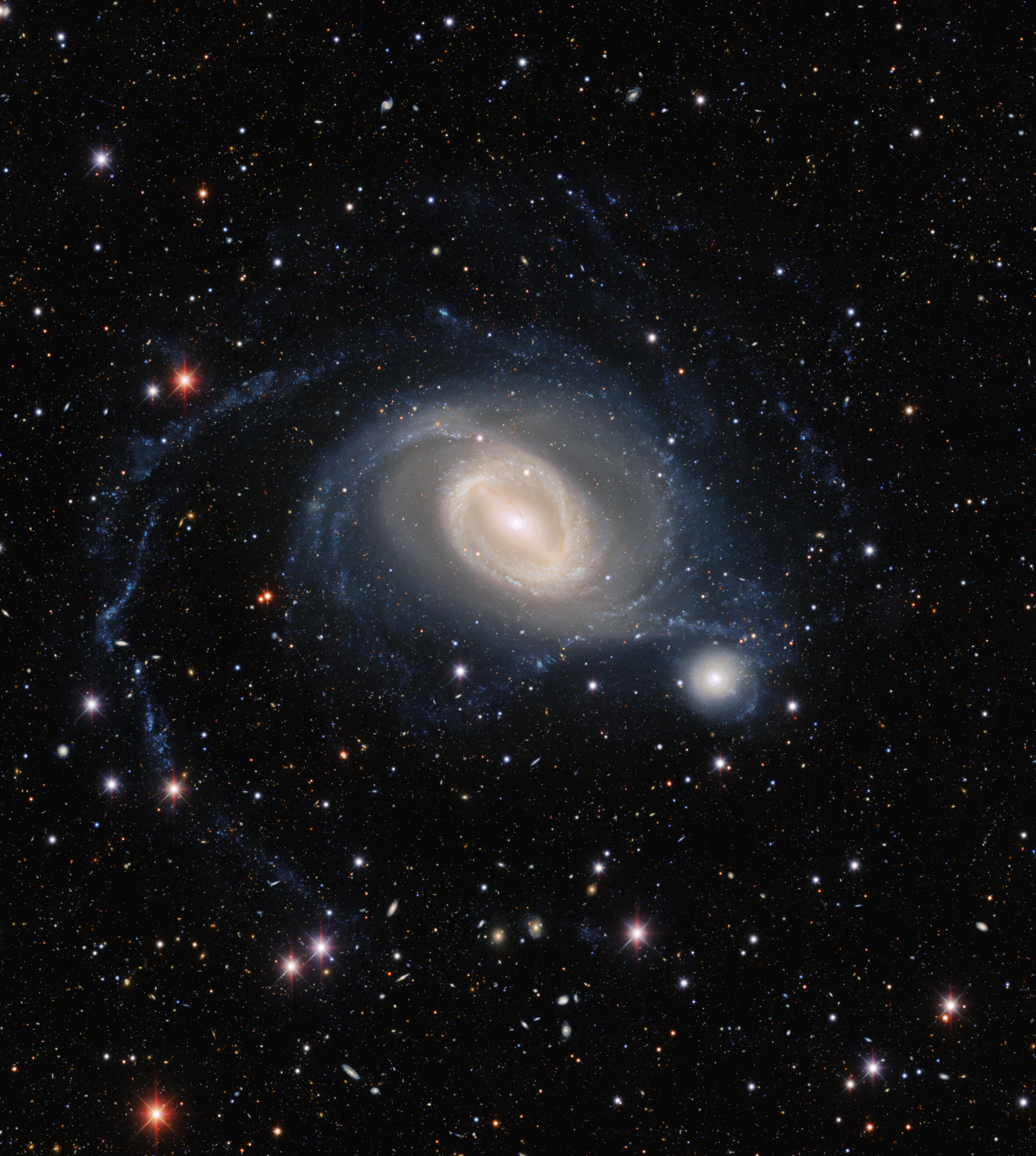
- NGC 1512 and NGC 1510 imaged by the Cerro Tololo Inter-American Observatory

Observation data (J2000 epoch)
- Constellation: Horologium
- Right ascension: 04^{h} 03^{m} 54.1662^{s}
- Declination: −43° 20′ 55.658″
- Redshift: 0.002995±0.0000100
- Heliocentric radial velocity: 898±3 km/s
- Distance: 11.6 Mpc (38 Mly) h^{−1}_{0.73}
- Apparent magnitude (V): 11.1

Characteristics
- Type: SB(r)ab
- Size: 213,140 ly (65.38 kpc) (estimated)
- Apparent size (V): 8.9′ × 5.6′

Other designations
- ESO 250- G 004, IRAS 04022-4329, 2MASX J04035428-4320558, MCG -07-09-007, PGC 14391

NGC 1512 is a barred spiral galaxy approximately 38 million light-years away from Earth in the constellation Horologium. It was discovered by Scottish astronomer James Dunlop on 29 October 1826.

The galaxy displays a double ring structure, with a (nuclear) ring around the galactic nucleus and an (inner) further out in the main disk. The galaxy hosts an extended UV disc with at least 200 clusters with recent star formation activity. NGC 1512 is a member of the Dorado Group.

== Gravitational interaction with NGC 1510 ==
Gravitational tidal forces of NGC 1512 are influencing nearby dwarf lenticular galaxy NGC 1510. The two galaxies are separated by only ~5 arcmin (13.8 kpc), and are in the process of a lengthy merger which has been going on for 400 million years. At the end of this process NGC 1512 will have cannibalised its smaller companion.

Interaction between these two galaxies has triggered star formation activity in the outskirts of the disc and enhanced the tidal distortion in the arms of the NGC 1512. The interaction seems to occur in the north-western areas of the system because of the broadening of the H i arm and the spread of the UV-rich star clusters in this region.

NGC 1512 is part of a galaxy group known as NGC 1512 group (also known as LGG 108). It consists of at least 3 members, which are NGC 1510 and NGC 1487. It is considered to be one of the filaments around the Fornax-Eridanus Complex.

== Gallery ==
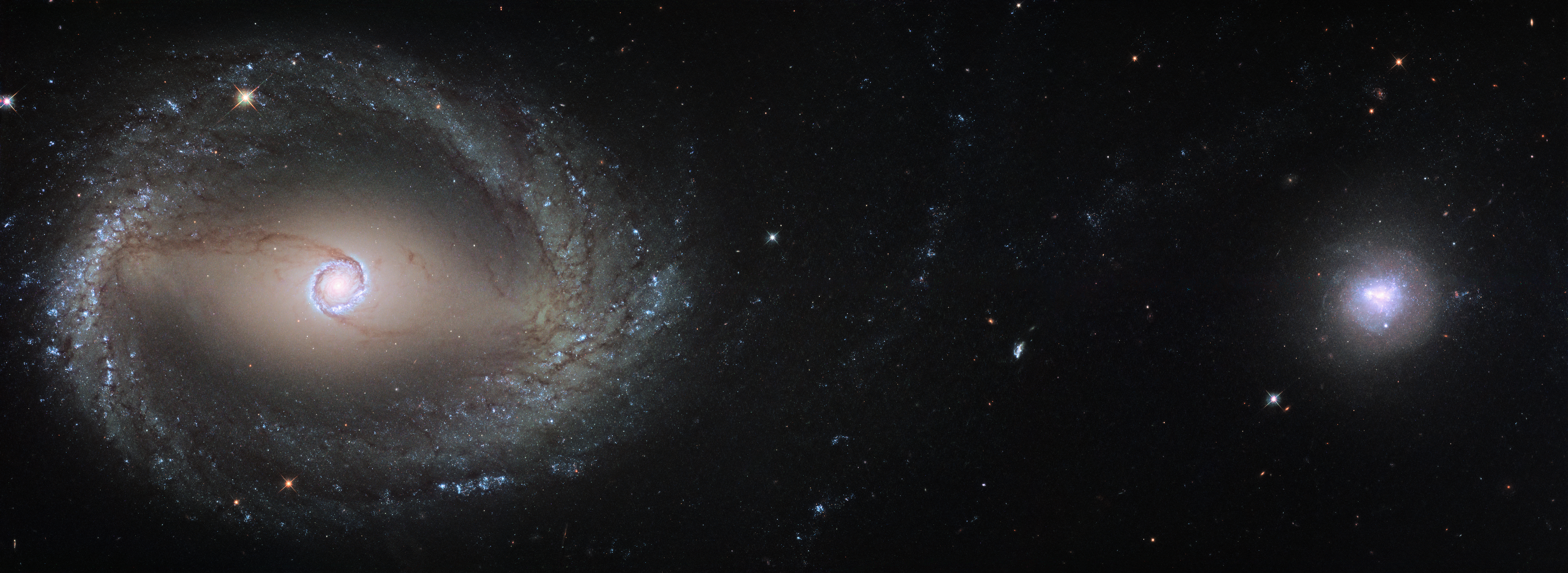
NGC 1512 and its companion the dwarf galaxy NGC 1510.

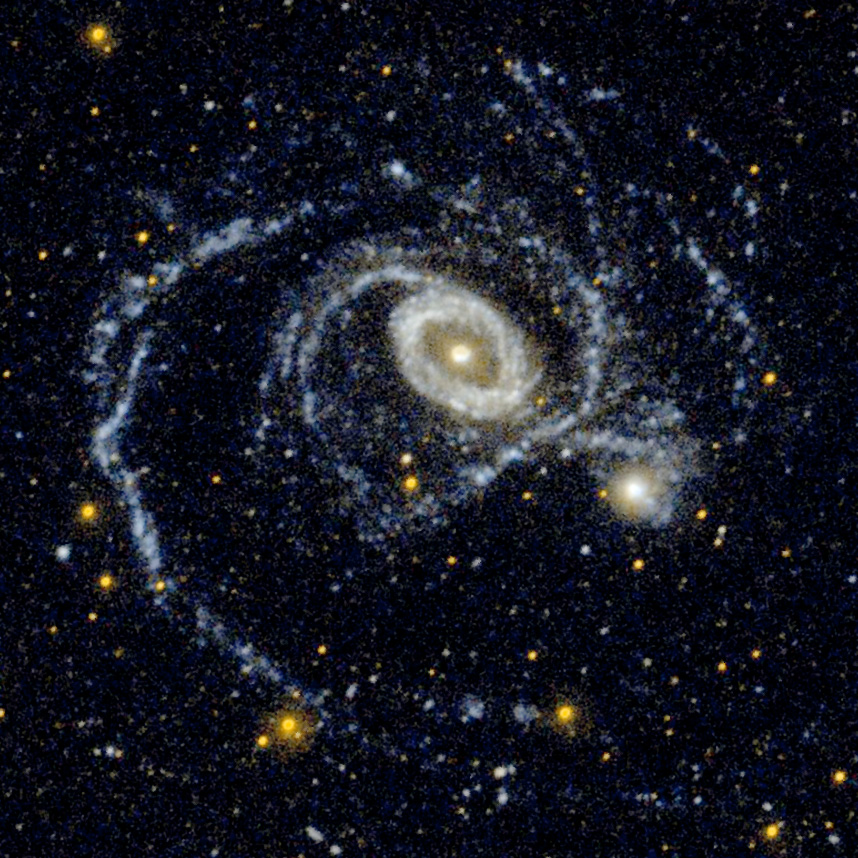
An ultraviolet image of NGC 1510 and NGC 1512 taken with GALEX. The image shows that NGC 1512 has spiral arms that extend well beyond its optical disk. Credit:GALEX/NASA/JPL-Caltech.

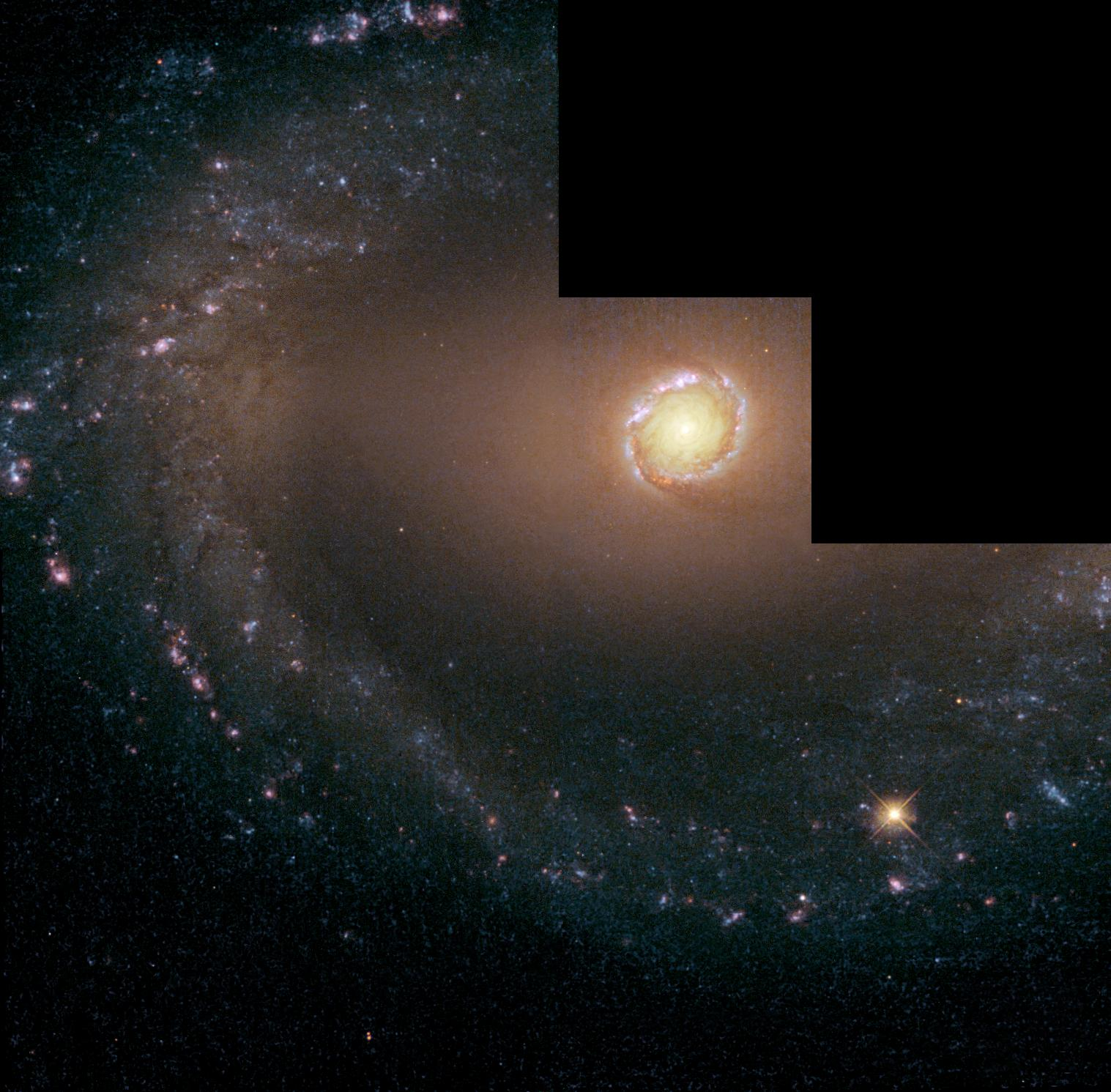
The galaxy seen by the Hubble Space Telescope.

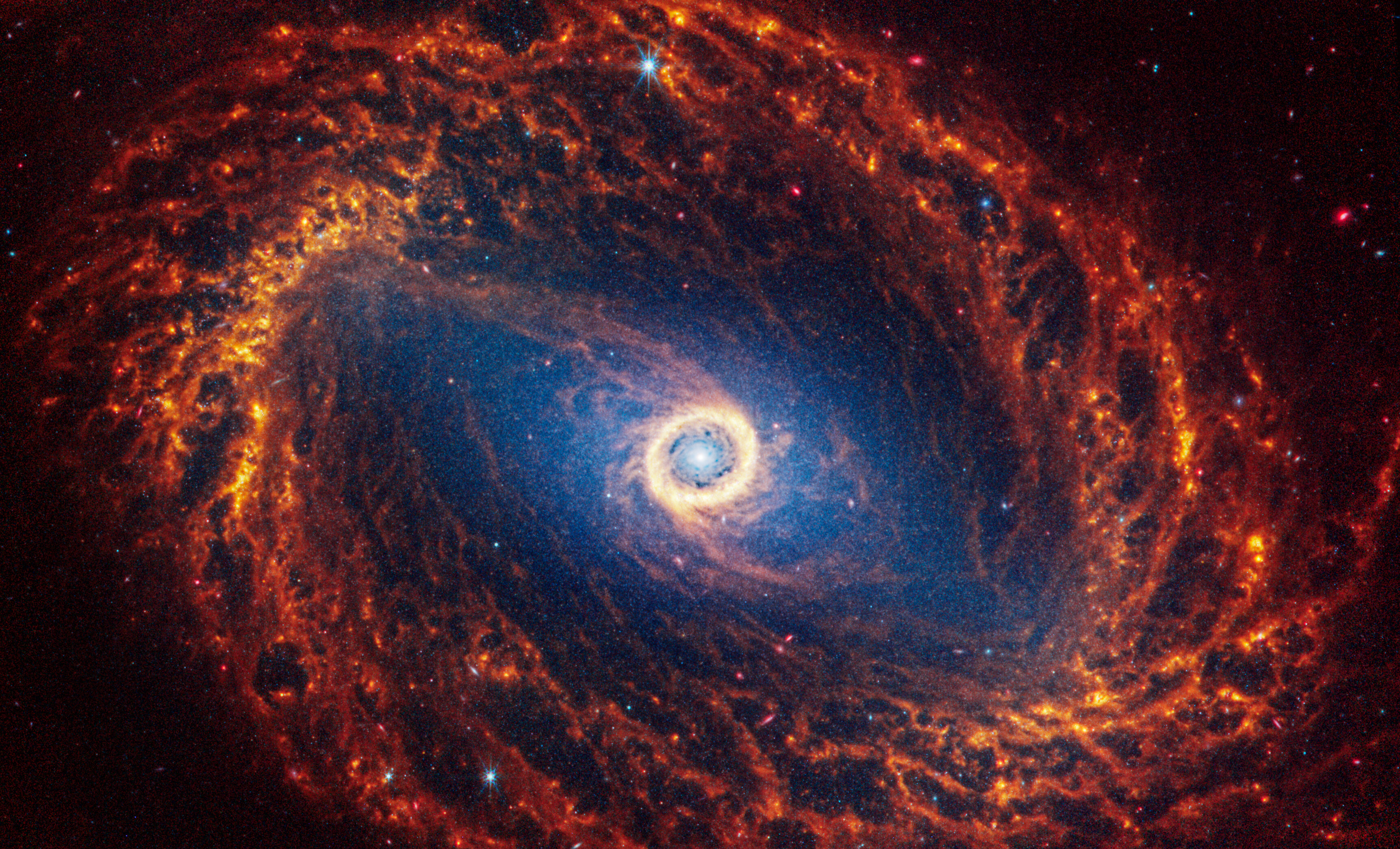
NGC 1512 seen by the James Webb Space Telescope.

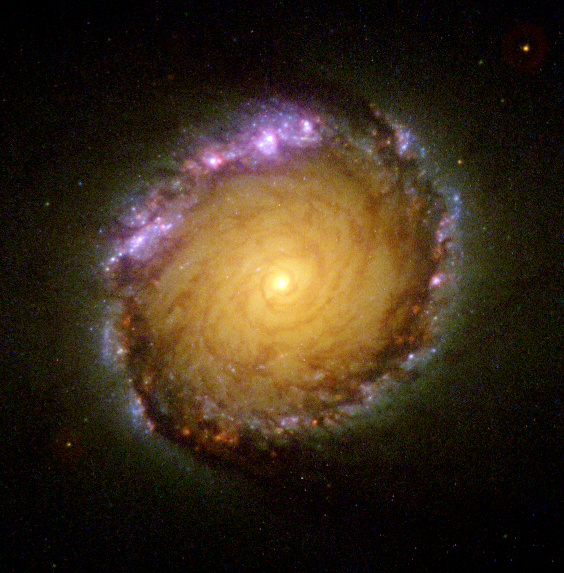
The nuclear ring of NGC 1512 as imaged by the Hubble Space Telescope (HST).
Credit: HST/NASA/ESA.

== See also ==
- NGC 4314
- Messier 94
- List of NGC objects (1001–2000)
