= NGC 1261 =

Globular cluster in the constellation Horologium

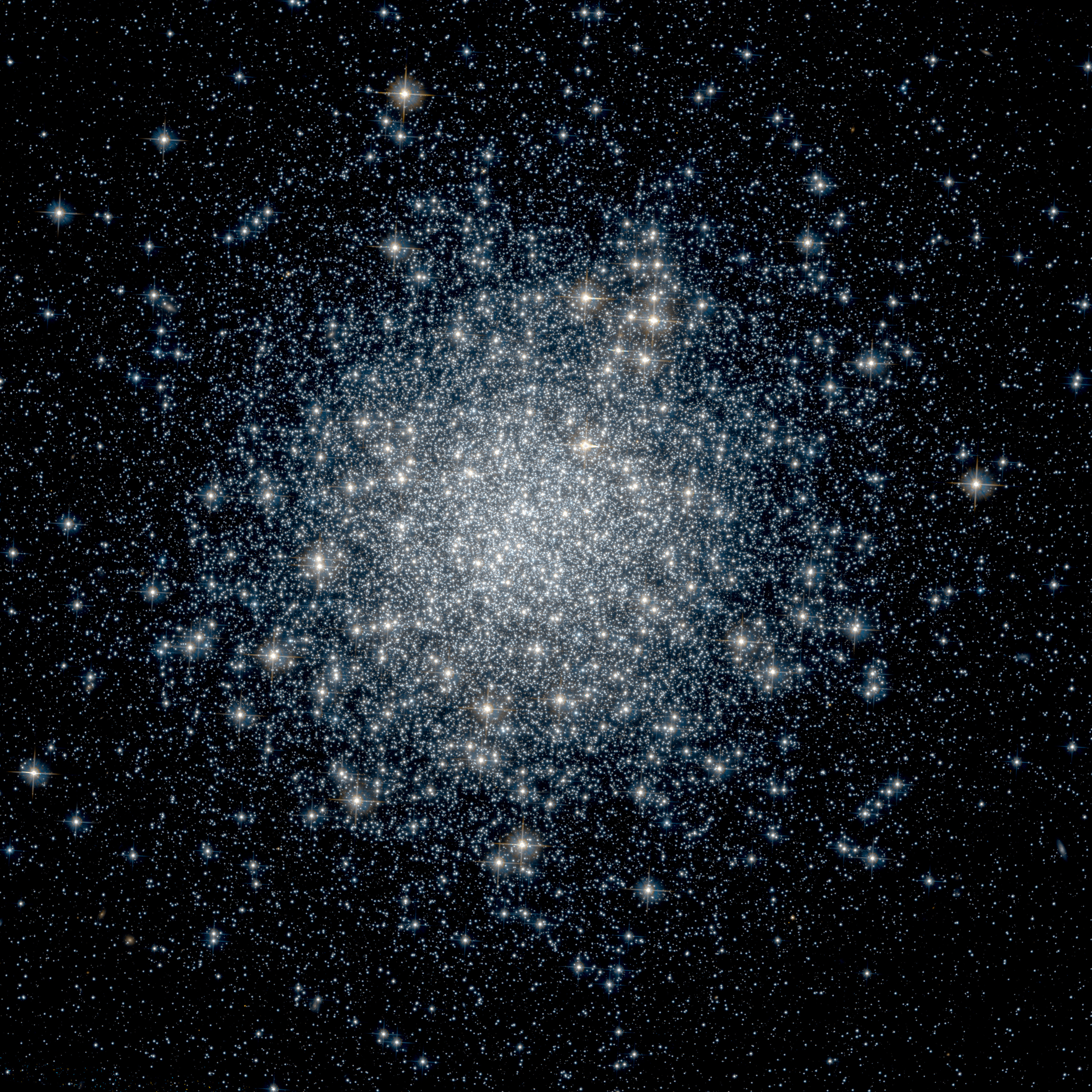
- NGC 1261 from Hubble Legacy Archive

Observation data (J2000.0 epoch)
- Class: II
- Constellation: Horologium
- Right ascension: 03^{h} 12^{m} 16.21^{s}
- Declination: –55° 12′ 58.4″
- Distance: 53.5 kly (16.4 kpc)
- Apparent magnitude (V): 8.63
- Apparent dimensions (V): 6.9′

Physical characteristics
- Absolute magnitude: −7.81
- Mass: 3.41×10^{5} M_{☉}
- Metallicity: [Fe/H] = −1.38±0.14 dex
- Estimated age: 10.24 Gyr
- Other designations: GCL 5, ESO 155-SC11, Caldwell 87, Melotte 19

NGC 1261 (also known as Caldwell 87) is a globular cluster of stars in the southern constellation of Horologium, first discovered by Scottish astronomer James Dunlop in 1826. The cluster is located at a distance of 53 kilolight-years from the Sun, and 59 kilolight-years from the Galactic Center. It is about 10.24 billion years old with 341,000 times the mass of the Sun. The cluster does not display the normal indications of core collapse, but evidence suggests it may have instead passed through a post core-collapse bounce state within the past two billion years. The central luminosity density is 2.22 L_{☉}·pc^{−3}, which is low for a globular cluster. Despite this, it has a Shapley–Sawyer Concentration Class of II, indicating a dense central concentration.

A total of 22 RR Lyrae variables have been discovered in this cluster, along with two long-period variables, three SX Phoenicis variables, and an eclipsing binary. It was determined to be an Oosterhoff type I cluster, based on the periods of fourteen of the RR Lyrae variables. 18 probable blue straggler candidates have been identified.
