= TW Horologii =

Star in the constellation Horologium

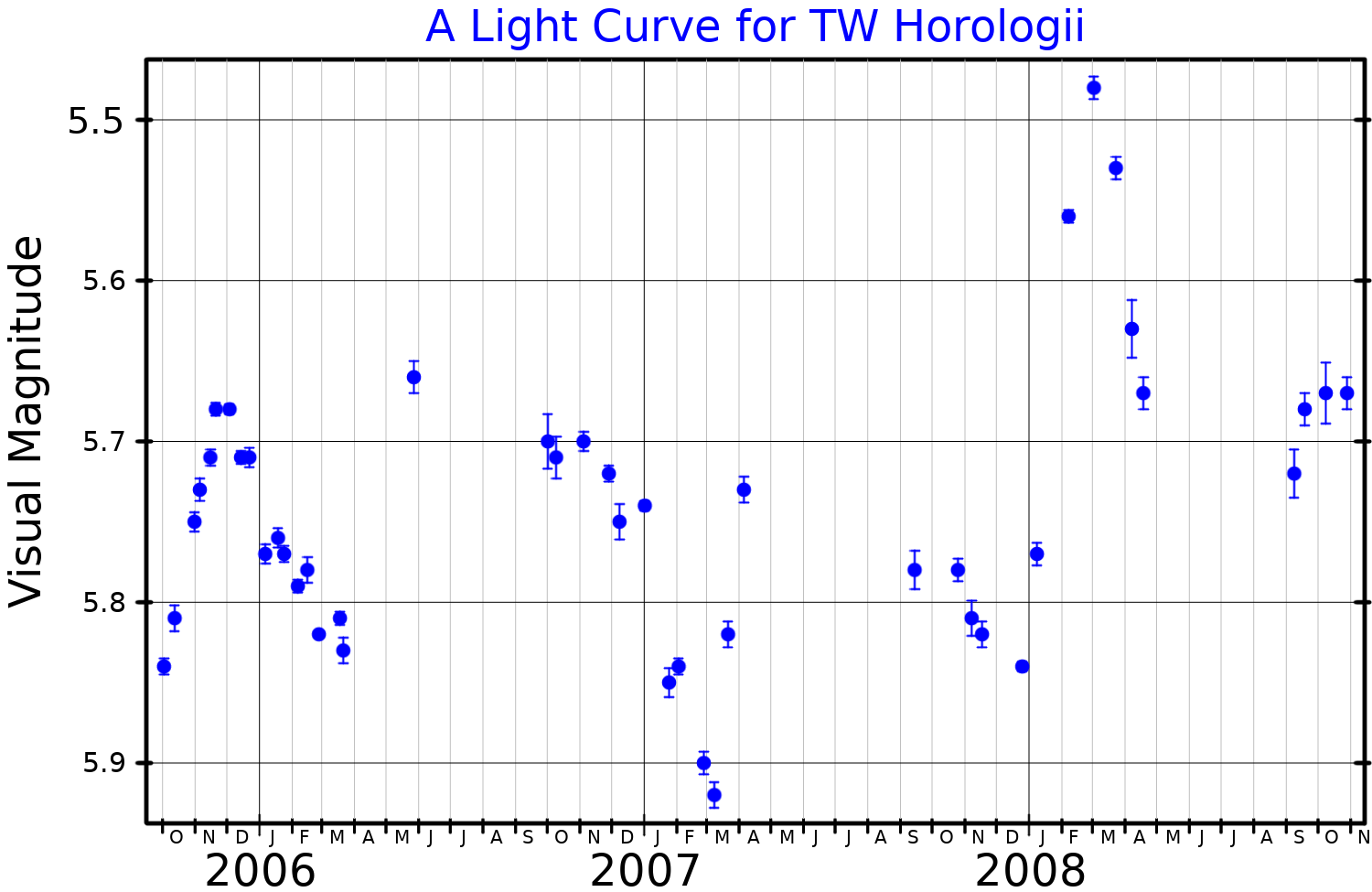
- A visual band light curve for TW Horologii, plotted from data published by Tabur et al. (2009)

Observation data Epoch J2000 Equinox ICRS
- Constellation: Horologium
- Right ascension: 03^{h} 12^{m} 33.16062^{s}
- Declination: −57° 19′ 17.5710″
- Apparent magnitude (V): 5.52 to 5.95

Characteristics
- Evolutionary stage: AGB
- Spectral type: C-N4IIIb: (C_{2}3.5)
- U−B color index: +2.93
- B−V color index: +2.419±0.014
- Variable type: SRb

Astrometry
Radial velocity (R_{v})	+14.3±2.9 km/s
Proper motion (μ)	RA: +18.492 mas/yr Dec.: +13.298 mas/yr
Parallax (π)	2.3755±0.1295 mas
Distance	1,370 ± 70 ly (420 ± 20 pc)
Absolute magnitude (M_{V})	−1.79
Absolute bolometric magnitude (M_{bol})	−4.62

Details
Mass	3.29±0.65 M_{☉}
Radius	300 (Note: Applying the Stefan–Boltzmann law with a nominal solar effective temperature of 5,772 K: $$\sqrt{6,700\times\left(\frac{5,772}{3,000}\right)^4} = 303\ R_\odot$$.) R_{☉}
Luminosity	6,700 L_{☉}
Surface gravity (log g)	0.049 cgs
Temperature	3,000 K

Other designations
- TW Hor, CD−57°626, FK5 118, HD 20234, HIP 14930, HR 977, SAO 233037

Database references
SIMBAD	data

TW Horologii is a carbon star and semiregular variable in the southern constellation of Horologium, near the eastern constellation border with Reticulum. It has a ruddy hue and, with an apparent visual magnitude that ranges from 5.52 down to 5.95, is visible to the naked eye and one of the brightest carbon stars. Based on parallax measurements, it is located at a distance of approximately 1,370 light years from the Sun. It is drifting further away with a radial velocity of +14 km/s. In the past this star has been considered a member of the open cluster NGC 1252, but this now seems unlikely.

This star was designated Sigma^{2} Horologii by Johann Elert Bode in his 1801 Uranographia, but this is now no longer used.

This is an aging red giant star on the asymptotic giant branch with a stellar classification of C-N4IIIb: and a C_{2} index of C_{2}3.5. It has been listed as a standard star for that MK spectral class. The star is classified as a semiregular variable of type SRb and has a periodicity of 158 days. It has expanded to 303 times the radius of the Sun and, on average, is radiating 6,700 times the Sun's luminosity from its swollen photosphere at an effective temperature of 3,000 K. If it replaced the Solar System, the perihelion of Mars would be inside the star. The short-lived element technetium has been observed in the spectrum, an indicator of thermal pulses during helium shell burning.

Based on the detection of excess ultraviolet excess, it is most likely a binary star system. An analysis of the motion of TW Horologii suggests a low-mass companion, although the UV excess suggests it is hot.

In 2013 the luminosity of Mira variables, based on Hipparcos parallaxes, was used to calibrate a period–luminosity relationship for carbon stars. The absolute magnitude of TW Horologii was calculated to be −1.79.
