= NGC 1487 =

Galaxy in the constellation Eridanus

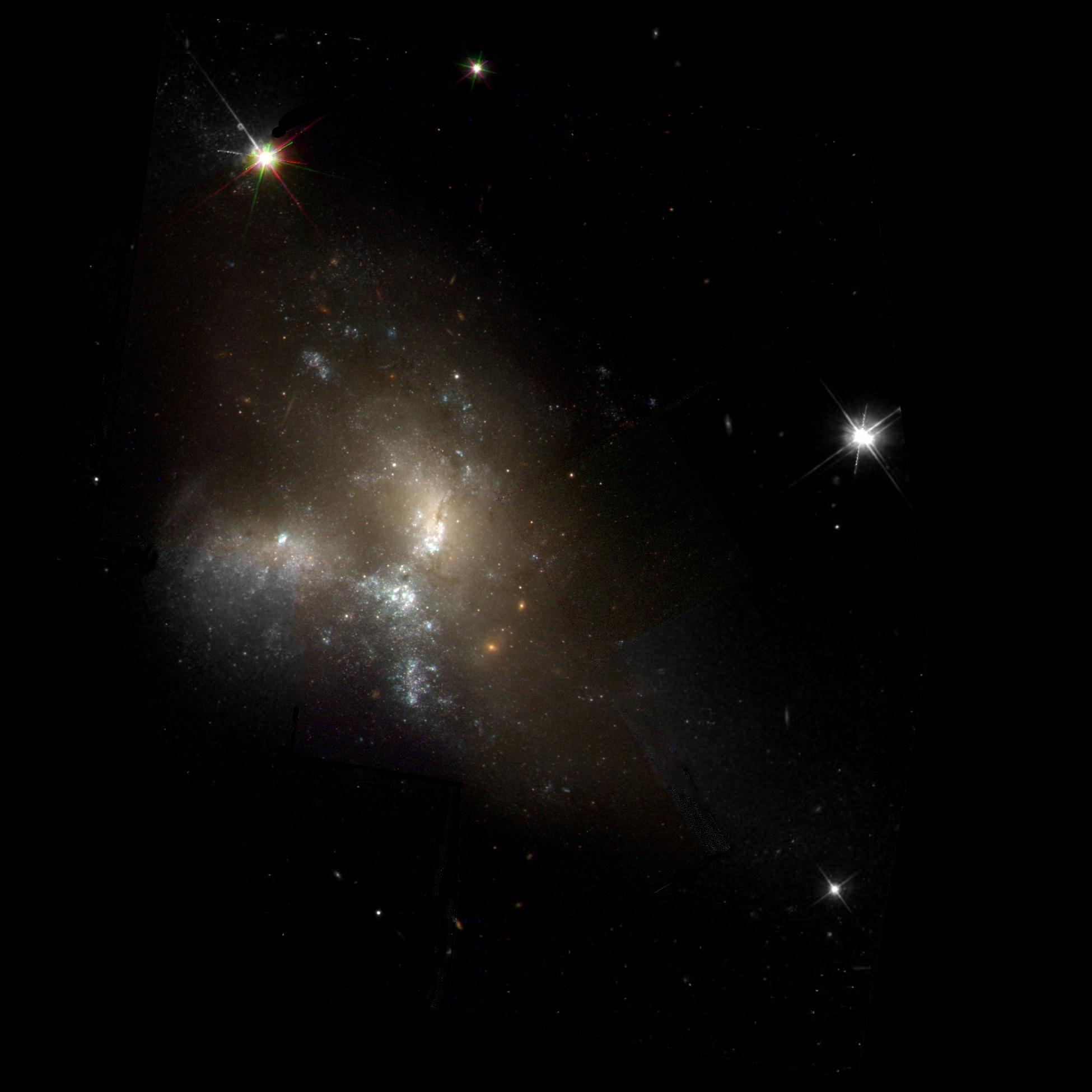
- Hubble Space Telescope image of NGC 1487

Observation data (J2000 epoch)
- Constellation: Eridanus
- Right ascension: 03^{h} 55^{m} 46^{s}
- Declination: −42° 22′ 01″
- Redshift: 0.002829
- Heliocentric radial velocity: 848 ± 1 km/s
- Group or cluster: LGG 108
- Apparent magnitude (V): 11.68
- Apparent magnitude (B): 12.28
- Magnitude (H): 9.71
- Magnitude (K): 9.56

Characteristics
- Type: Pec

Other designations
- NGC 1487, MCG-07-09-002, LEDA 14117

NGC 1487 is an irregular galaxy in the constellation Eridanus. It was discovered by James Dunlop on Oct 29, 1826.

It is thought to be the remnant of two galaxies, which are the components NGC 1487E and NGC 1487W, that collided about 500 million years ago.

NGC 1487 is part of a galaxy group known as NGC 1512 group (also known as LGG 108). It consists of at least 3 members, which are NGC 1510 and NGC 1512. It is considered to be one of the filaments around the Fornax-Eridanus Complex.

== See also ==
- List of NGC objects (1001–2000)

== Gallery ==
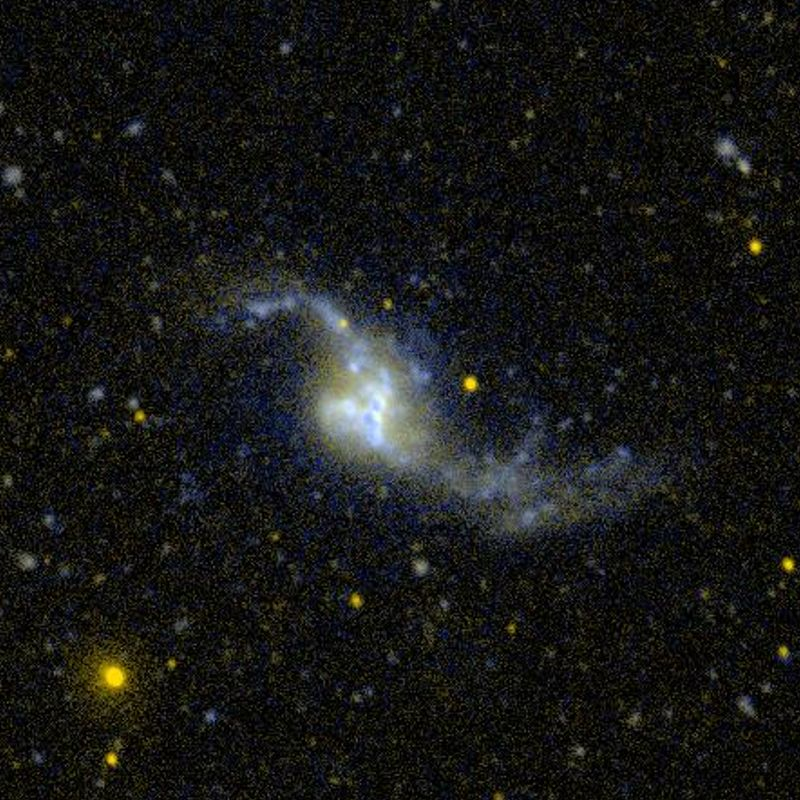
NGC 1487 by GALEX
