= Eta Horologii =

Binary star system in the constellation Horologium

Observation data Epoch J2000.0 Equinox J2000.0 (ICRS)
- Constellation: Horologium
- Right ascension: 02^{h} 37^{m} 24.37297^{s}
- Declination: −52° 32′ 35.0855″
- Apparent magnitude (V): 5.31

Characteristics
- Spectral type: A6 V + F0 V
- B−V color index: +0.27

Astrometry
Radial velocity (R_{v})	−3.0±7.4 km/s
Proper motion (μ)	RA: +112.70 mas/yr Dec.: +3.73 mas/yr
Parallax (π)	21.95±1.10 mas
Distance	149 ± 7 ly (46 ± 2 pc)
Absolute magnitude (M_{V})	2.13

Orbit
Period (P)	3.01±0.18 yr
Semi-major axis (a)	0.0231±0.0014″
Eccentricity (e)	0.16±0.14

Details

η Hor A
Mass	1.75 M_{☉}
Luminosity	12.6 L_{☉}
Surface gravity (log g)	4.21 cgs
Temperature	7,552±257 K
Rotational velocity (v sin i)	6.6±2.2 km/s
Age	474 Myr

η Hor B
Mass	1.65 M_{☉}

Other designations
- η Hor, CPD−53°457, FK5 2182, HD 16555, HIP 12225, HR 778, SAO 232835

Database references
SIMBAD	data

Eta Horologii (η Horologii, η Hor) is a binary star system in the southern constellation of Horologium. It is visible to the naked eye with a combined apparent visual magnitude of 5.31. Based upon an annual parallax shift of 21.95 mas as seen from Earth, it is located around 149 light years from the Sun.

The orbit for this pair is not yet well constrained. They appear to have an orbital period of three years and an eccentricity of roughly 0.16. As of 2012, the pair have an angular separation of 78.7 mas, which corresponds to a projected separation of 3.6 AU. The primary member, component A, is an A-type main sequence star with a stellar classification of A6 V. The secondary, component B, has an inferred class of F0 V, which would indicate it is an F-type main sequence star.
