= R Horologii =

Variable star in the constellation Horologium

- Location of R Horologii (circled in red)

Observation data Epoch J2000.0 Equinox ICRS
- Constellation: Horologium
- Right ascension: 02^{h} 53^{m} 52.77010^{s}
- Declination: −49° 53′ 22.7305″
- Apparent magnitude (V): 4.7 – 14.3

Characteristics
- Spectral type: M5-7e
- B−V color index: 1.044±0.011
- Variable type: Mira

Astrometry
Radial velocity (R_{v})	+60.0±4.4 km/s
Proper motion (μ)	RA: +128.567 mas/yr Dec.: +35.766 mas/yr
Parallax (π)	4.3236±0.1524 mas
Distance	756.0+31.6 −30.3 ly (231.8+9.7 −9.3 pc)

Details
Mass	0.89 M_{☉}
Radius	630 (Note: Applying the Stefan–Boltzmann law with a nominal solar effective temperature of 5,772 K: $$\sqrt{8,500 \times \left( \frac{5,772}{2,200}\right)^4} = 630\ R_\odot$$) R_{☉}
Luminosity	8,500 L_{☉}
Surface gravity (log g)	−0.44 cgs
Temperature	2,200 K
Metallicity [Fe/H]	+0.545 dex

Other designations
- R Hor, AAVSO 0250-50, CD−50°860, HD 18242, HIP 13502, HR 868

Database references
SIMBAD	data

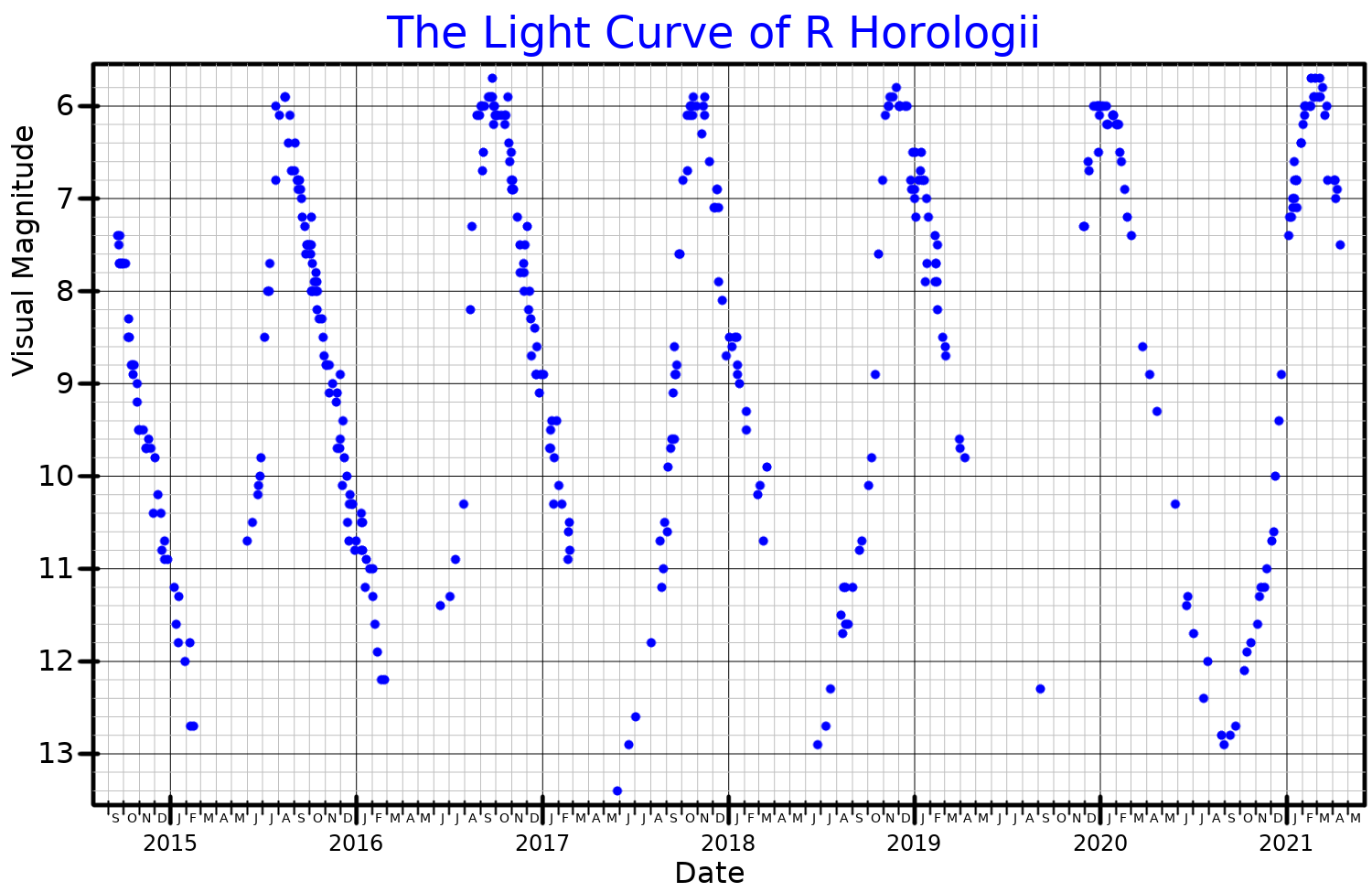
The light curve of R Horologii from AAVSO V band data

R Horologii is a red giant star approximately 760 light-years away in the southern constellation of Horologium. It is a Mira variable with a period of 404.83 days, ranging from apparent magnitude 4.7 to 14.3—one of the largest ranges in brightness known of stars in the night sky visible to the unaided eye. The star is losing mass at the rate of 5.9×10^{−7} M_{☉}·y^{−1}.
