= Alpha Horologii =

Star in the constellation Horologium

- Location of α Horologii (circled in red)

Observation data Epoch J2000 Equinox J2000
- Constellation: Horologium
- Right ascension: 04^{h} 14^{m} 00.114^{s}
- Declination: −42° 17′ 39.73″
- Apparent magnitude (V): +3.846

Characteristics
- Evolutionary stage: Giant star
- Spectral type: K2 III
- U−B color index: +1.013
- B−V color index: 1.083±0.037

Astrometry
Radial velocity (R_{v})	+21.6±0.3 km/s
Proper motion (μ)	RA: +41.992±0.125 mas/yr Dec.: −203.157±0.154 mas/yr
Parallax (π)	27.721±0.11195 mas
Distance	117.6+0.55 −0.52 ly (36.06+0.17 −0.16 pc)
Absolute bolometric magnitude (M_{bol})	+1.08

Details
Mass	1.409±0.265 M_{☉}
Radius	9.931±0.351 R_{☉}
Luminosity	37.61 L_{☉}
Surface gravity (log g)	2.82±0.02 cgs
Temperature	4695±50 K
Metallicity [Fe/H]	−0.03±0.03 dex
Age	3.561±2.333 Gyr

Other designations
- α Hor, CD−42°1425, HD 26967, HIP 19747, HR 1326, SAO 216710

Database references
SIMBAD	data

Alpha Horologii (α Horologii) is a solitary orange-hued giant star and the brightest star in the constellation Horologium. It is visible to the naked eye with an apparent visual magnitude of +3.85. Based upon an parallax shift of 27.721 mas as seen from the Earth, it is located at a distance of 117.6 light-years (36.1 parsecs). The star is moving away from the Sun with a radial velocity of +21.6 km/s.

The stellar classification of K2 III indicates this is an evolved giant star of the K class. This means it has consumed the hydrogen at its core and has migrated away from the main sequence, with its outer envelope cooling and expanding in the process. Alpha Horologii has an estimated 1.41 times the mass of the Sun and is radiating 38 times the Sun's luminosity from its photosphere at an effective temperature of 4,695 K. Being 3.56 billion years old, it has swollen to around 10 times the diameter of the Sun, having spent much of its life as a white main sequence star.
