= Horologium (constellation) =

Constellation in the southern celestial hemisphere

- Constellation
- List of stars in Horologium
- Abbreviation: Hor
- Genitive: Horologii
- Pronunciation: /ˌhɒrəˈloʊdʒiəm, -ˈlɒ-/, genitive /ˌhɒrəˈloʊdʒiˌaɪ, -ˈlɒ-/
- Symbolism: The Pendulum Clock
- Right ascension: 02^{h} 12^{m} 48.5665^{s}–04^{h} 20^{m} 18.3390^{s}
- Declination: −39.6368256°–−67.0358200°
- Quadrant: SQ1
- Area: 249 sq. deg. (58th)
- Main stars: 6
- Bayer/Flamsteed stars: 10
- Stars brighter than 3.00^{m}: 0
- Stars within 10.00 pc (32.62 ly): 1
- Brightest star: α Hor (3.85^{m})
- Nearest star: GJ 1061
- Messier objects: 0
- Meteor showers: 0
- Bordering constellations: Eridanus; Hydrus; Reticulum; Dorado; Caelum
- Visible at latitudes between +23° and −90°. Best visible at 21:00 (9 p.m.) during the month of December.

Horologium (Latin hōrologium, the pendulum clock, from Greek ὡρολόγιον, lit. 'an instrument for telling the hour') is a faint constellation in the southern celestial hemisphere. It was first described by the French astronomer Nicolas-Louis de Lacaille in 1756 and visualized by him as a clock with a pendulum and a second hand. In 1922 the constellation was redefined by the International Astronomical Union (IAU) as a region of the celestial sphere containing Lacaille's stars, and has since been an IAU designated constellation. Horologium's associated region is wholly visible to observers south of 23°N.

The constellation's brightest star—and the only one brighter than an apparent magnitude of 4—is Alpha Horologii (at 3.85), an aging orange giant star that has swollen to around 11 times the diameter of the Sun. The long-period variable-brightness star, R Horologii (4.7 to 14.3), has one of the largest variations in brightness among all stars in the night sky visible to the unaided eye. Four star systems in the constellation are known to have exoplanets; at least one—Gliese 1061—contains an exoplanet in its habitable zone.

== History ==
The French astronomer Nicolas-Louis de Lacaille first described the constellation as l'Horloge à pendule & à secondes (Clock with pendulum and seconds hand) in 1756, after he had observed and catalogued almost 10,000 southern stars during a two-year stay at the Cape of Good Hope. He devised fourteen new constellations in previously uncharted regions of the southern celestial hemisphere, which were not visible from Europe. All but one honoured scientific instruments, and so symbolised the Age of Enlightenment. (Note: The exception is Mensa, named for Table Mountain. The other twelve (alongside Horologium) are Antlia, Caelum, Circinus, Fornax, Microscopium, Norma, Octans, Pictor, Pyxis, Reticulum, Sculptor and Telescopium.) The constellation name was Latinised to Horologium in a catalogue and updated chart published posthumously in 1763. The Latin term is ultimately derived from the Ancient Greek ὡρολόγιον, for an instrument for telling the hour.

== Characteristics ==
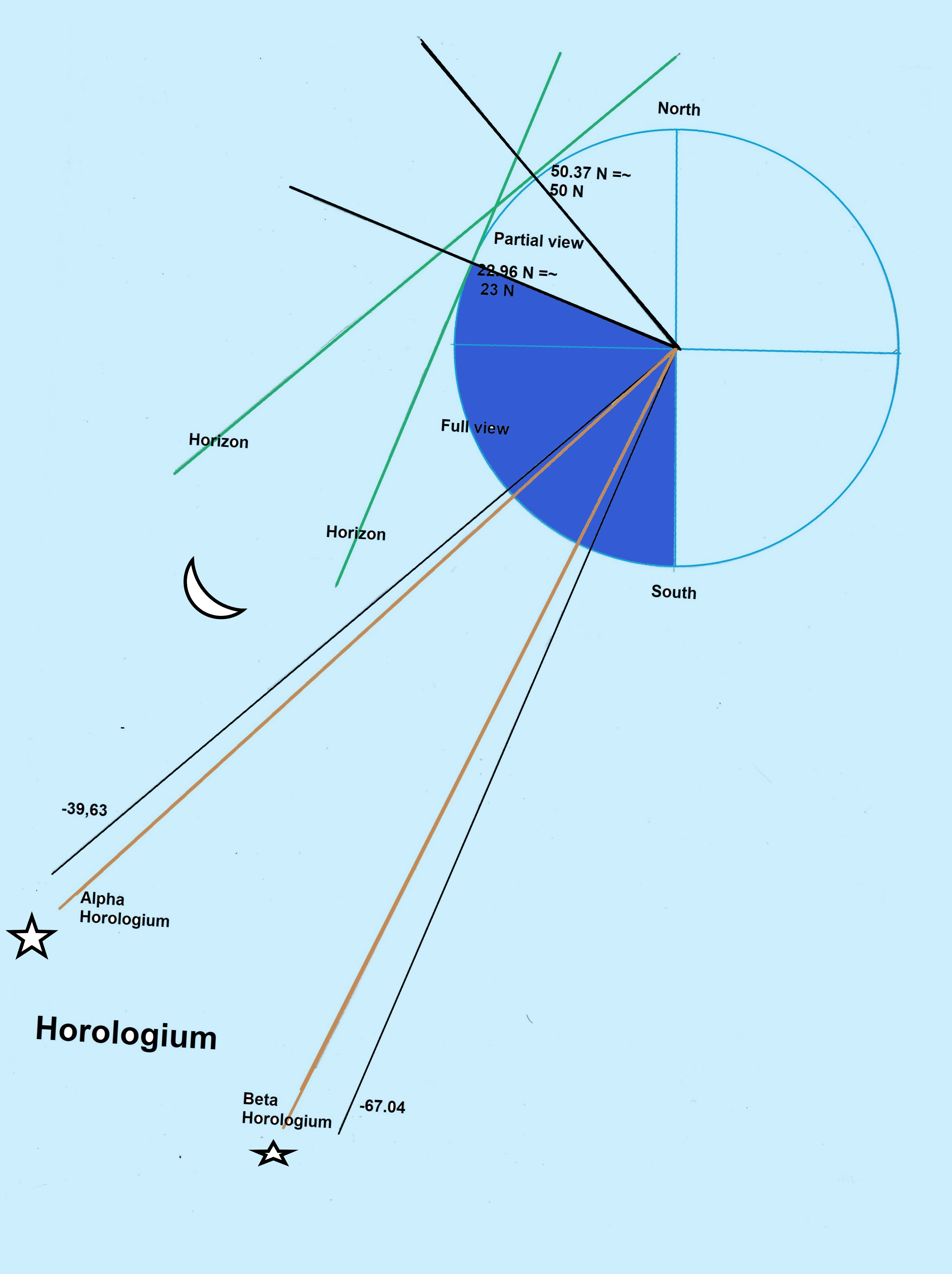
Horologium showing the tangent line, or viewer's horizon, at latitude approx 23°N, which is parallel to the line of −67.04 declination, the southern boundary of the constellation.

Covering a total of 248.9 square degrees or 0.603% of the sky, Horologium ranks 58th in area out of the 88 modern constellations. Its position in the southern celestial hemisphere means the whole constellation is visible to observers south of 23°N. (Note: While parts of the constellation technically rise above the horizon to observers between the latitudes of 23°N and 50°N, those stars within a few degrees of the horizon are difficult to see.) Horologium is bordered by five constellations: Eridanus (the Po river or Nile river), Caelum (the chisel), Reticulum (the reticle), Dorado (the dolphin/swordfish), and Hydrus (the male water snake). The three letter abbreviation for the constellation, as adopted by the International Astronomical Union in 1922, is "Hor". The official constellation boundaries are defined by a twenty-two-sided polygon (illustrated in infobox). In the equatorial coordinate system, the right ascension coordinates of these borders lie between 02^{h} 12.8^{m} and 04^{h} 20.3^{m} , while the declination coordinates are between −39.64° and −67.04°.

== Features ==
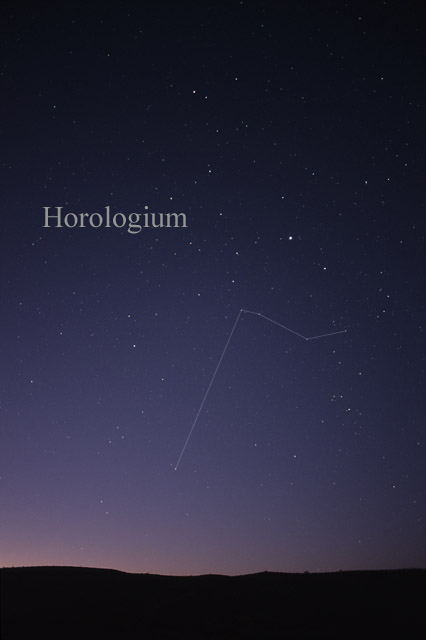
The constellation Horologium as it can be seen by the naked eye

=== Stars ===
Horologium has one star brighter than apparent magnitude 4, and 41 stars brighter than or equal to magnitude 6.5. (Note: Objects of magnitude 6.5 are among the faintest visible to the unaided eye from locations between suburban and rural areas in night skies.) Lacaille charted and designated 11 stars in the constellation, giving them the Bayer designations Alpha (α Hor) through Lambda Horologii (λ Hor) in 1756. In the mid-19th century, English astronomer Francis Baily removed the designations of two—Epsilon and Theta Horologii—as he held they were too faint to warrant naming. He was unable to find a star that corresponded to the coordinates of Lacaille's Beta Horologii. Determining that the coordinates were wrong, he assigned the designation to another star. Kappa Horologii, too, was unable to be verified—although it most likely was the star HD 18292—and the name fell out of use. In 1879, American astronomer Benjamin Apthorp Gould assigned designations to what became Mu and Nu Horologii as he felt they were bright enough to warrant them.

At magnitude 3.9, Alpha Horologii is the brightest star in the constellation, located 115 (± 0.5) light-years from Earth. German astronomer Johann Elert Bode depicted it as the pendulum of the clock, while Lacaille made it one of the weights. It is an orange giant star of spectral type K2III that has swollen to around 11 times the diameter of the Sun, having spent much of its life as a white main-sequence star. At an estimated 1.55 times the mass of the Sun, it is radiating 38 times the Sun's luminosity from its photosphere at an effective (surface) temperature of 5,028 K.

At magnitude 4.93, Delta Horologii is the second-brightest star in the constellation, and forms a wide optical double with Alpha. Delta itself is a true binary system composed of a white main sequence star of spectral type A5V that is 1.41 times as massive as the Sun with a magnitude of 5.15 and its fainter companion of magnitude 7.29. The system is located 179 (± 4) light-years from the earth.

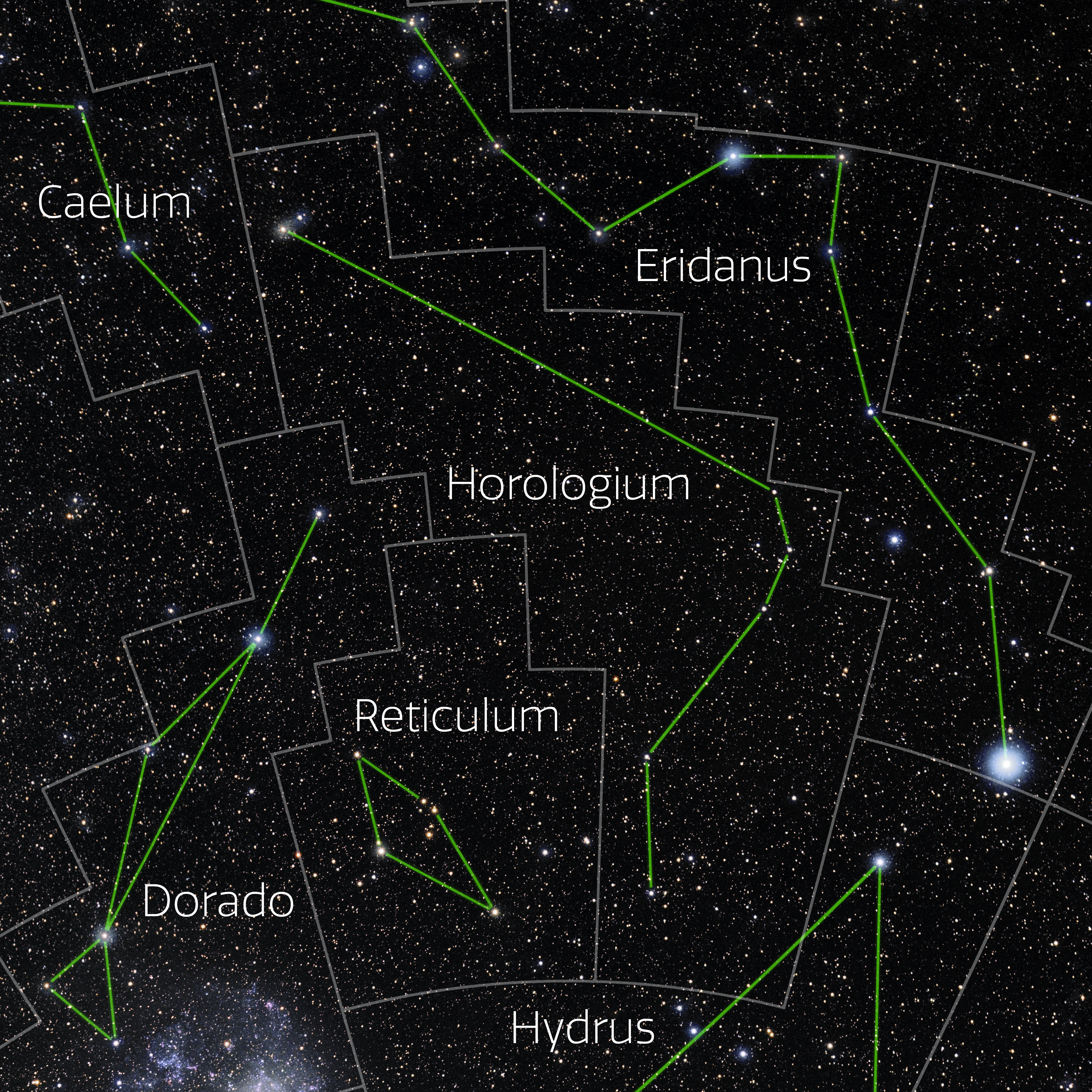
The constellation Horologium showing the IAU boundaries, the constellation stick figure, and labels for its brightest stars. Astrophotograph by Eckhard Slawik, from NOIRLab's 88 Constellations project.

At magnitude 5.0, Beta Horologii is a white giant 63 times as luminous as the Sun with an effective temperature of 8,303 K. It is 312 (± 4) light-years from Earth, and has been little-studied. Lambda Horologii is an ageing yellow-white giant star of spectral type F2III that spins around at 140 km/second, and is hence mildly flattened at its poles (oblate). It is 161 (± 1) light-years from Earth.

With a magnitude of 5.24, Nu Horologii is a white main sequence star of spectral type A2V located 169 (± 1) light-years from Earth that is around 1.9 times as massive as the Sun. Estimated to be around 540 million years old, it has a debris disk that appears to have two components: an inner disk is orbiting at a distance of 96+9
−37 AU, while an outer disk lies 410+24
−96 AU from the star. The estimated mass of the disks is 0.13%±0.07% the mass of the Earth.

Horologium has several variable stars. R Horologii is a red giant Mira variable with one of the widest ranges in brightness known of stars in the night sky visible to the unaided eye. It is around 1,000 light-years from Earth. It has a minimum magnitude of 14.3 and a maximum magnitude of 4.7, with a period of approximately 13 months. T and U Horologii are also Mira variables. The Astronomical Society of Southern Africa reported in 2003 that observations of these two stars were needed as data on their light curves was incomplete. TW Horologii is a semiregular variable red giant star that is classified as a carbon star, and is 1,370 (± 70) light-years from Earth.

Iota Horologii is a yellow-white dwarf star 1.23 (± 0.12) times as massive and 1.16 (± 0.04) times as wide as the Sun with a spectral type of F8V, 57 (± 0.05) light-years from Earth. Its chemical profile, movement and age indicate it formed within the Hyades cluster but has drifted around 130 light-years away from the other members. It has a planet at least 2.5 times as massive as Jupiter orbiting it every 307 days. HD 27631 is a Sun-like star located 164 (± 0.3) light-years from Earth which was found to have a planet at least 1.45 times as massive as Jupiter that takes 2,208 (± 66) days (six years) to complete an orbit. WASP-120 is a yellow-white main-sequence star around 1.4 times as massive as the Sun with a spectral type of F5V that is estimated to be 2.6 (± 0.5) billion years old. It has a massive planet around 4.85 times the mass of Jupiter that completes its orbit every 3.6 days, and has an estimated surface temperature of 1,880 (± 70) K.

With an apparent magnitude of 13.06, Gliese 1061 is a red dwarf of spectral type M5.5V that has 12% of the mass and 15% of the diameter of the Sun, and shines with only 0.17% of its luminosity. Located 12 light-years away from Earth, it is the 20th-closest single star or stellar system to the Sun. In August 2019, it was announced that it had three planets, one of which lay in its habitable zone.

=== Deep-sky objects ===
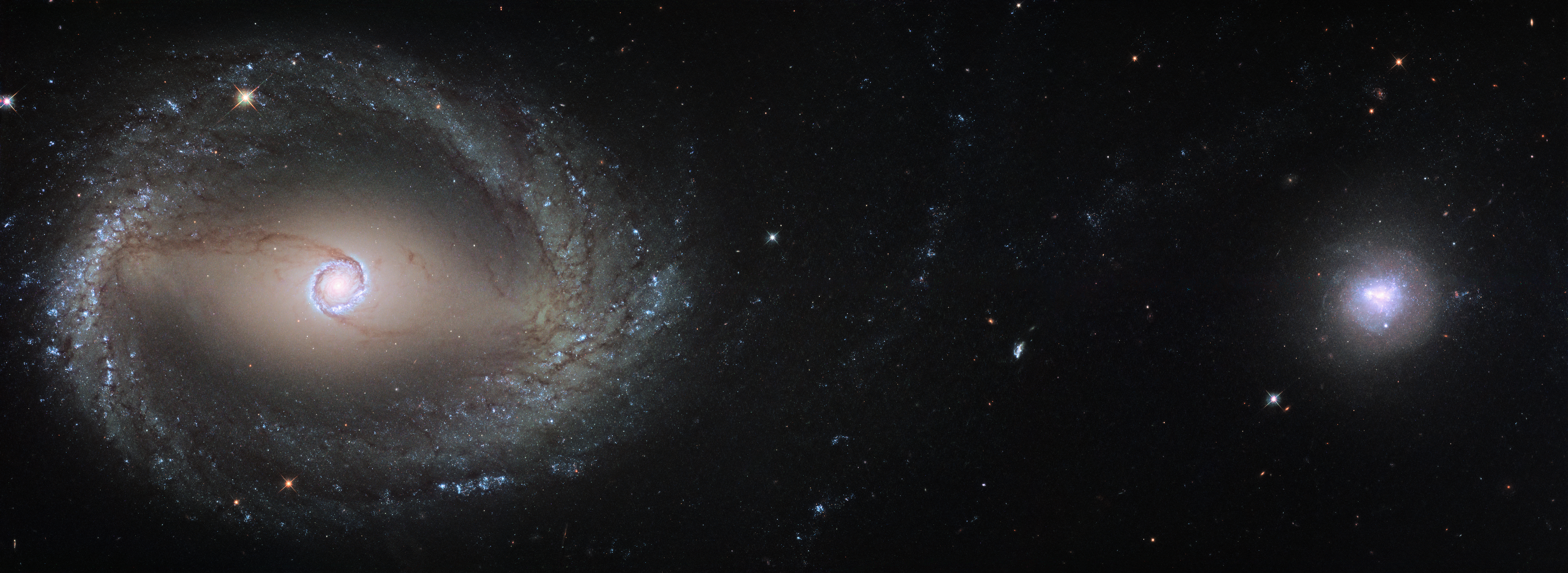
Composite image of NGC 1512 (left) and the dwarf galaxy NGC 1510

Horologium is home to many deep-sky objects, including several globular clusters. NGC 1261 is a globular cluster of magnitude 8, located 53,000 light-years from Earth. It lies 4.7 degrees north-northeast of Mu Horologii. The globular cluster Arp-Madore 1 is the most remote known globular cluster in the Milky Way at a distance of 123.3 kiloparsecs (402,000 light-years) from Earth.

NGC 1512 is a barred spiral galaxy 2.1 degrees west-southwest of Alpha Horologii with an apparent magnitude of 10.2. About five arcmin (13.8 kpc) away is the dwarf lenticular galaxy NGC 1510. The two are in the process of a merger which has been going on for 400 million years.

The Horologium-Reticulum Supercluster is a galaxy supercluster, second in mass only to the Shapley Supercluster in the local universe (anything within 200 mpc of Earth). It contains over 20 Abell galaxy clusters and covers more than 100 deg^{2} of the sky, centered roughly at equatorial coordinates α = 03^{h} 19^{m} , δ = 50° 2′.

== See also ==
- Horologium (Chinese astronomy)
