= NGC 873 =

Galaxy in the constellation Cetus

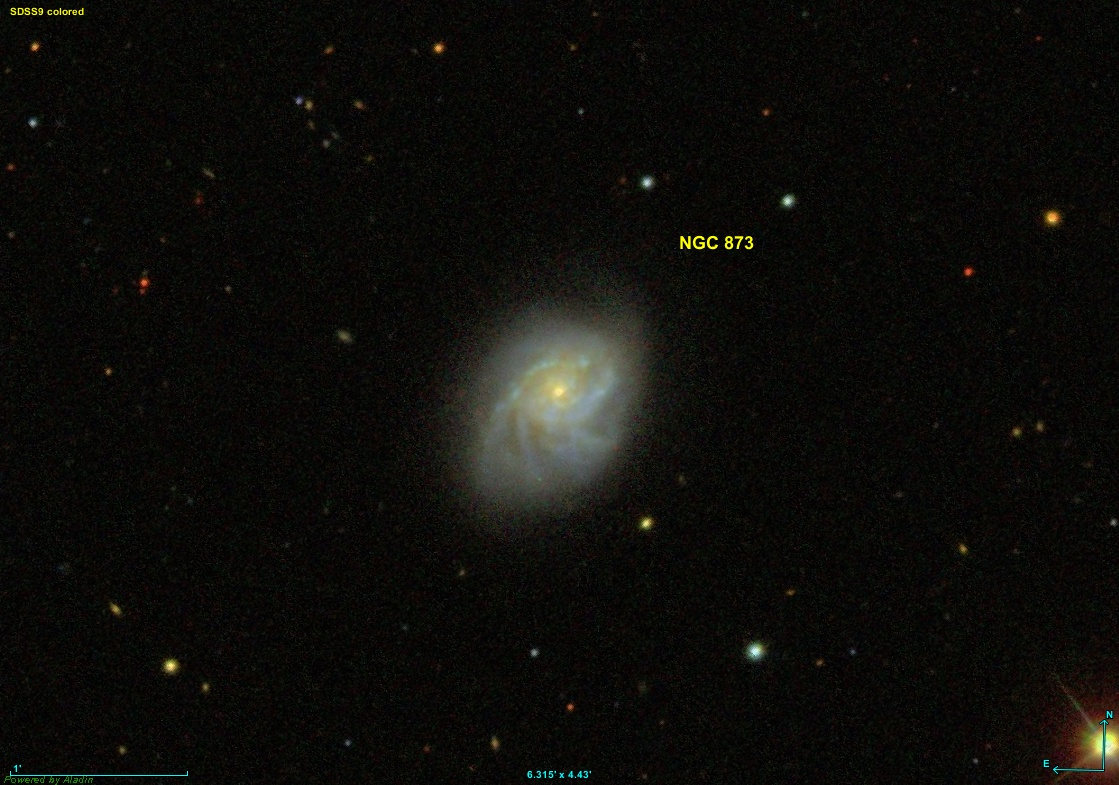
- NGC 873 imaged by SDSS

Observation data (J2000 epoch)
- Constellation: Cetus
- Right ascension: 02^{h} 16^{m} 32.3511^{s}
- Declination: −11° 20′ 54.477″
- Redshift: 0.013403±0.0000140
- Heliocentric radial velocity: 4,018±4 km/s
- Distance: 181.7 ± 12.8 Mly (55.70 ± 3.91 Mpc)
- Group or cluster: NGC 835 Group (LGG 49)
- Apparent magnitude (V): 12.83

Characteristics
- Type: Sc pec
- Size: ~86,300 ly (26.47 kpc) (estimated)
- Apparent size (V): 1.6′ × 1.3′

Other designations
- IRAS 02140-1134, 2MASX J02163235-1120549, MCG -02-06-048, PGC 8692

NGC 873 is a peculiar spiral galaxy in the constellation of Cetus. Its velocity with respect to the cosmic microwave background is 3,777±17 km/s, which corresponds to a Hubble distance of 181.7 ± 12.8 Mly (55.70 ± 3.91 Mpc). It was discovered by German-British astronomer William Herschel on 27 November 1785.

NGC 873 has a possible active galactic nucleus, i.e. it has a compact region at the center of a galaxy that emits a significant amount of energy across the electromagnetic spectrum, with characteristics indicating that this luminosity is not produced by the stars.

== NGC 835 group ==
NGC 873 is a member of the NGC 835 galaxy group (also known as LGG 49). The other galaxies in the group are NGC 833, NGC 835, NGC 838, NGC 839, NGC 848, and UGCA 23.

== Supernova ==
One supernova has been observed in NGC 873:

- SN 2022xjk (Type II, mag. 17.414) was discovered by the Zwicky Transient Facility on 12 October 2022.

== See also ==
- List of NGC objects (1–1000)
