= NGC 7393 =

Galaxy in the constellation Aquarius

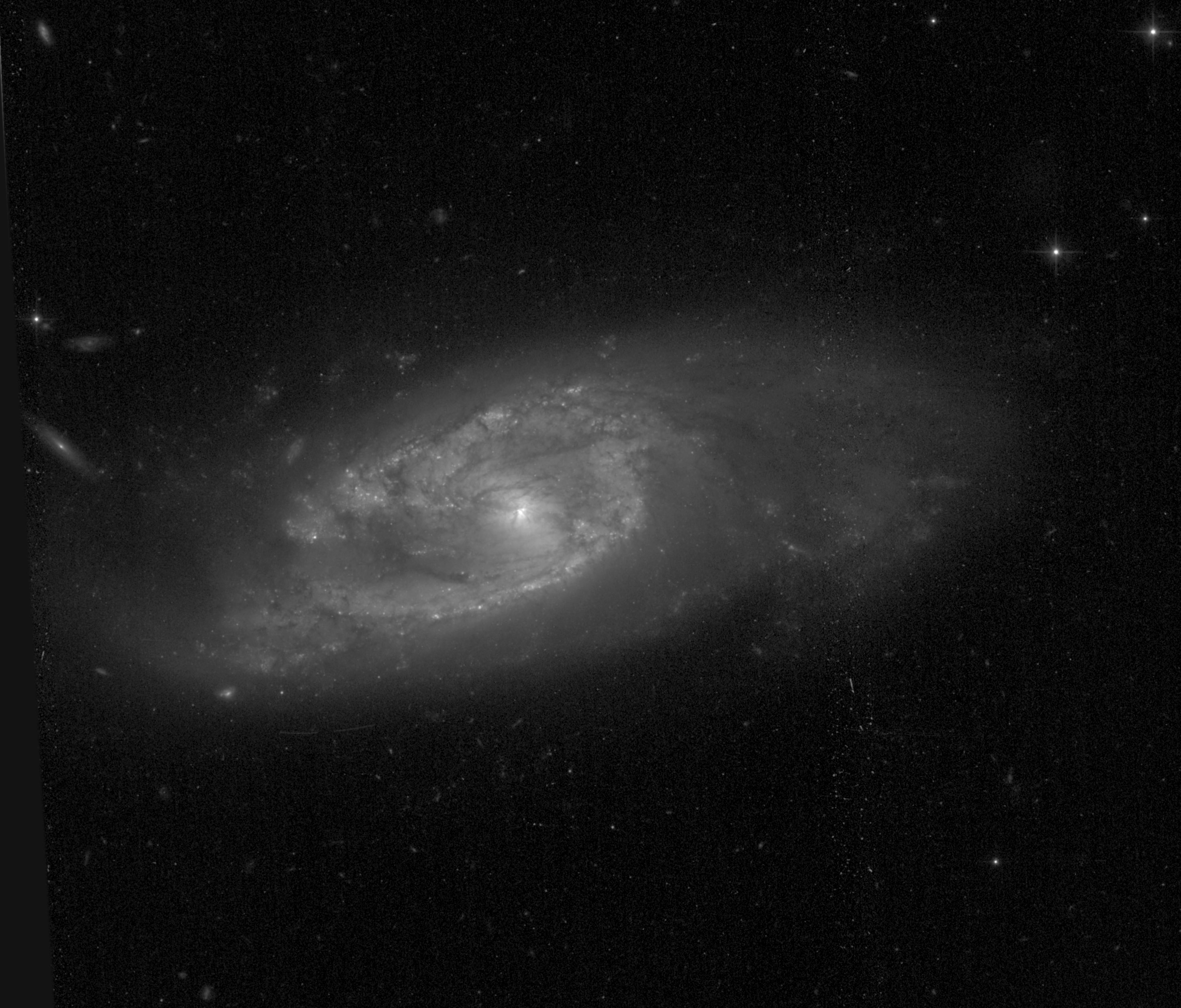

Observation data (J2000 epoch)
- Constellation: Aquarius
- Right ascension: 22^{h} 51^{m} 38.1^{s}
- Declination: −05° 33′ 26″
- Redshift: 0.012522 ± 0.000017
- Heliocentric radial velocity: 3754 ± 5 km/s
- Apparent magnitude (B): 13.4
- Surface brightness: 22.84 mag/arcsec2

Characteristics
- Type: SB(rs)c pec
- Apparent size (V): 1.9′ × 0.9′

Other designations
- VV 68, Arp 15, MCG -01-58-002, PGC 69874

NGC 7393 is a barred spiral galaxy in the constellation Aquarius. It is estimated to about 120 million light-years from the Milky Way and about 70,000 light-years in diameter. NGC 7393 belongs to the class of spiral galaxies with separated sections in the Arp catalog. Astronomer Halton Arp divided his catalog of unusual galaxies into groups based on purely morphological criteria. NGC 7393 was discovered by astronomer William Herschel on October 5, 1785.

== Gallery ==
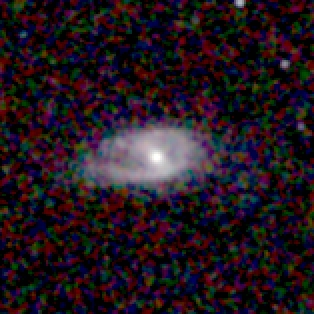
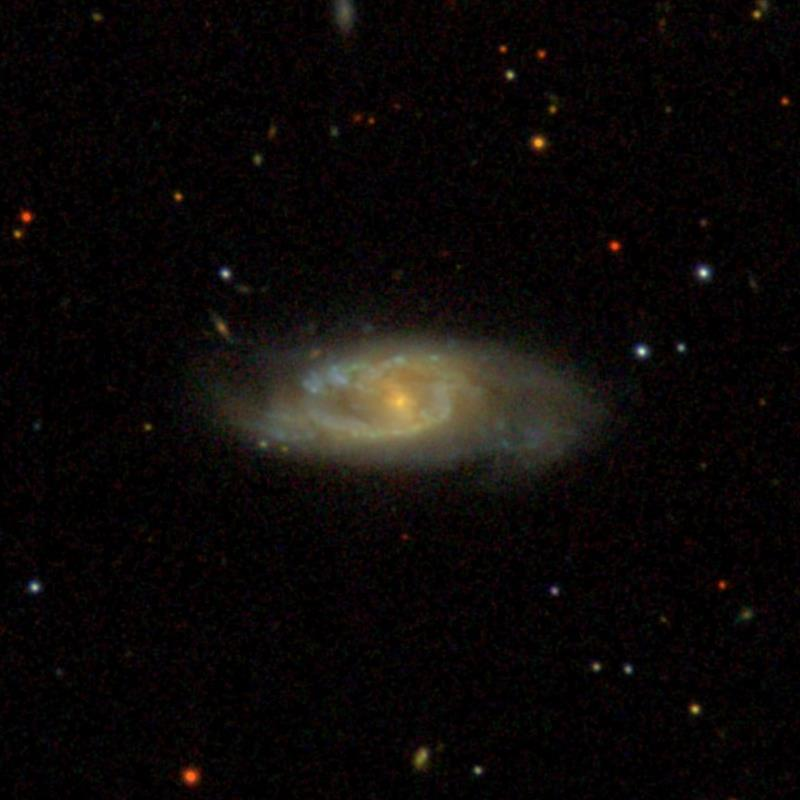

== See also ==
- Atlas of Peculiar Galaxies
- List of NGC objects (7001–7840)
