= NGC 685 =

Galaxy in the constellation Eridanus

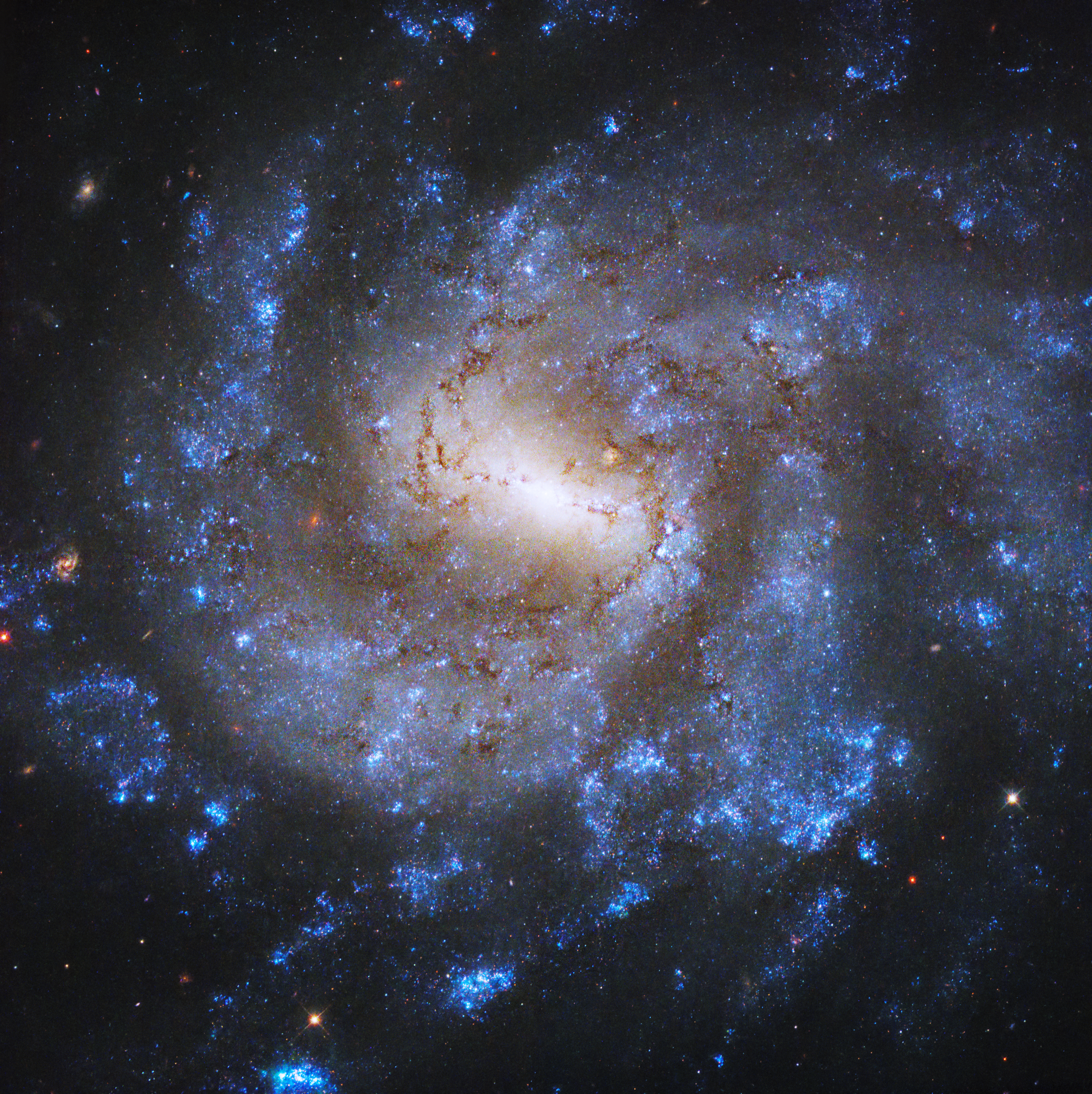
- NGC 685 imaged by the Hubble Space Telescope

Observation data (J2000 epoch)
- Constellation: Eridanus
- Right ascension: 01^{h} 47^{m} 42.8593^{s}
- Declination: −52° 45′ 42.446″
- Redshift: 0.004546 ± 0.000010
- Heliocentric radial velocity: 1,363 ± 3 km/s
- Distance: 50–58 Mly (15.2-17.8 Mpc)
- Apparent magnitude (V): 11.2

Characteristics
- Type: SB(rs)d
- Size: ~74,300 ly (22.77 kpc) (estimated)
- Apparent size (V): 3.7′ × 3.3′

Other designations
- ESO 152- G 024, AM 0145-530A, IRAS 01458-5300, PGC 6581

NGC 685 is a barred spiral galaxy in the constellation Eridanus. The galaxy lies about 55 million light years away from Earth, which means, given its apparent dimensions, that NGC 685 is approximately 74,000 light years across. It was discovered by John Herschel on October 3, 1834.

This galaxy is seen nearly face-on, at an inclination of 23°. It is a barred spiral galaxy with its bright center bar and patchy, curving arms. The arms have low surface brightness and emerge from the bar and complete three quarters of a revolution before fading. The patches of bright blue along the galaxy’s arms are star clusters, groups of stars held together by their mutual gravitational attraction. Wisps of dark red near the central bar depict interstellar gas and dust, the matter from which stars form. The southeast edge of the galaxy features three bright HII regions, which Halton Arp argued they are a companion galaxy. H-alpha emission is stronger at the southeastern half of the galaxy. The total star formation rate of the galaxy is estimated to be 0.42 M_{☉} per year.

The whole galaxy is about 74,000 light-years across – a little more than half the size of our Milky Way. In the centre of the galaxy is predicted to lie a supermassive black hole whose mass is estimated to be between 7.6 and 40 million solar masses, based on the spiral arm pitch angle.

== See also ==
- List of NGC objects (1–1000)
