= NGC 191 =

Galaxy in the constellation Cetus

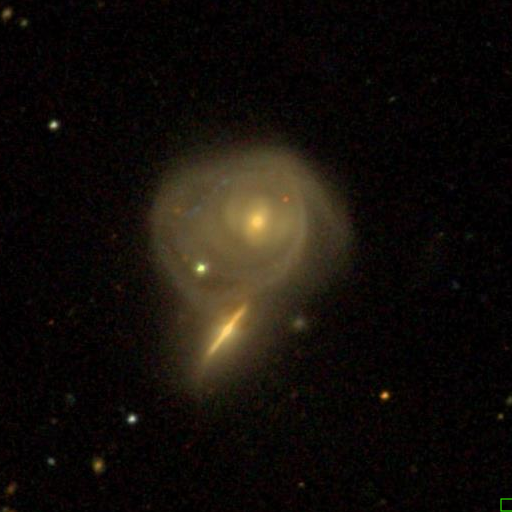
- SDSS image NGC 191 (above) and IC 1563 (below)

Observation data (J2000 epoch)
- Constellation: Cetus
- Right ascension: 00^{h} 38^{m} 59.4^{s}
- Declination: −09° 00′ 09″
- Redshift: 0.020267
- Apparent magnitude (V): 12.5

Characteristics
- Type: SAB(rs)c
- Apparent size (V): 1.5' × 1.2'
- Notable features: Interacting with IC 1563

Other designations
- Arp 127, MCG-02-02-077, 2MASX J00385944-0900099, PGC 2331.

NGC 191 is a spiral galaxy located in the constellation Cetus. It was discovered on November 28, 1785, by William Herschel.

NGC 191 is currently interacting with IC 1563. For that reason it was included in Halton Arp's Atlas of Peculiar Galaxies, under the section "Elliptical galaxies close to and perturbing spiral galaxies."
