= NGC 833 =

Galaxy in the constellation Cetus

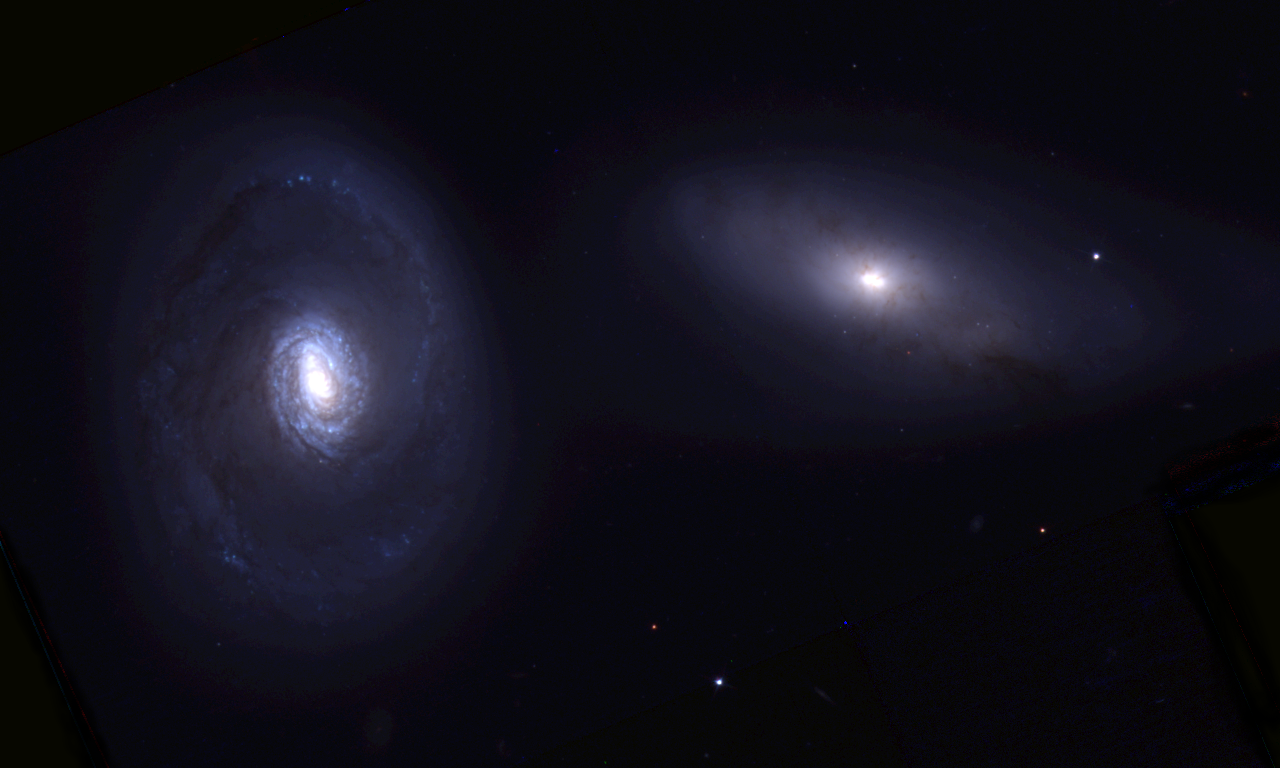
- NGC 833 (left) and NGC 835 (right)

Observation data (J2000 epoch)
- Right ascension: 02^{h} 09^{m} 20^{s}
- Declination: −10° 07′ 59″
- Apparent magnitude (V): 13
- Apparent magnitude (B): 14.02
- Surface brightness: 23.14 mag/arcsec2

Other designations
- MCG -02-06-030, PGC 8225

NGC 833 is an intermediate spiral galaxy in the constellation Cetus. It has an active Hubble-type Sa nucleus, and lies south of the celestial equator. It is estimated to be 173 million light-years from the Milky Way and about 75,000 light-years in diameter. Together with NGC 835, NGC 838 and NGC 839 it forms a group of galaxies cataloged as Hickson Compact Group 16 (Arp 318). Halton Arp divided his catalog of unusual galaxies into groups based on purely morphological criteria.

== See also ==
- Atlas of Peculiar Galaxies
- Interacting galaxy
