= Arp 239 =

Arp 239 is the designation in the Atlas of Peculiar Galaxies for the following pair of gravitationally interacting spiral galaxies in the constellation Ursa Major:

- NGC 5278
- NGC 5279
