= NGC 7292 =

Galaxy in the constellation Pegasus

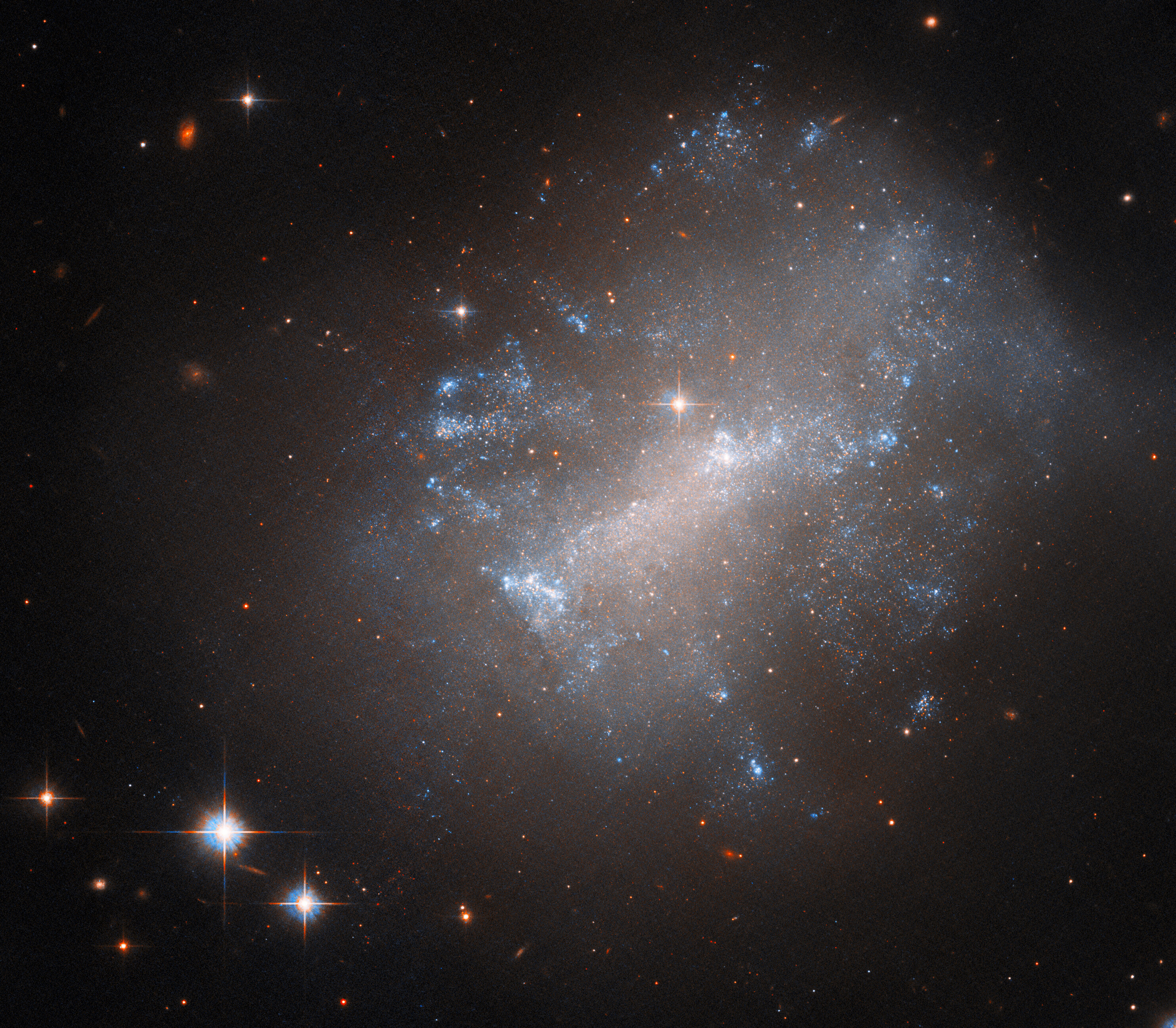
- NGC 7292 imaged by the Hubble Space Telescope

Observation data (J2000 epoch)
- Constellation: Pegasus
- Right ascension: 22^{h} 28^{m} 26.2896^{s}
- Declination: +30° 17′ 29.904″
- Redshift: 0.003292±0.0000130
- Heliocentric radial velocity: 987±4 km/s
- Distance: 38.55 ± 4.13 Mly (11.820 ± 1.266 Mpc)
- Apparent magnitude (V): 13.03

Characteristics
- Type: IBm
- Size: ~25,800 ly (7.91 kpc) (estimated)
- Apparent size (V): 2.1′ × 1.7′

Other designations
- IRAS 22261+3002, UGC 12048, MCG +05-53-003, PGC 68941, CGCG 495-003

NGC 7292 is a barred irregular galaxy in the constellation of Pegasus. Its velocity with respect to the cosmic microwave background is 652±24 km/s, which corresponds to a Hubble distance of 31.4 ± 2.5 Mly (9.62 ± 0.76 Mpc). However, six non-redshift measurements give a larger mean distance of 38.55 ± 4.13 Mly (11.820 ± 1.266 Mpc). It was discovered by French astronomer Édouard Stephan on 29 August 1872.

NGC 7292 has a possible active galactic nucleus, i.e. it has a compact region at the center of a galaxy that emits a significant amount of energy across the electromagnetic spectrum, with characteristics indicating that this luminosity is not produced by the stars.

== Supernovae ==
Two supernovae have been observed in NGC 7292.

- SN 1964H (Type II, mag. 13.5) was discovered by Howard Stiles Gates on 16 June 1964.
- SN 2026fov (Type II, mag. 13.5) was discovered by Kōichi Itagaki on 14 March 2026. It was located 11".6 east and 24".5 north of the center of NGC 7292.

== See also ==
- List of NGC objects (7001–7840)
