= NGC 1602 =

Galaxy in the constellation Dorado

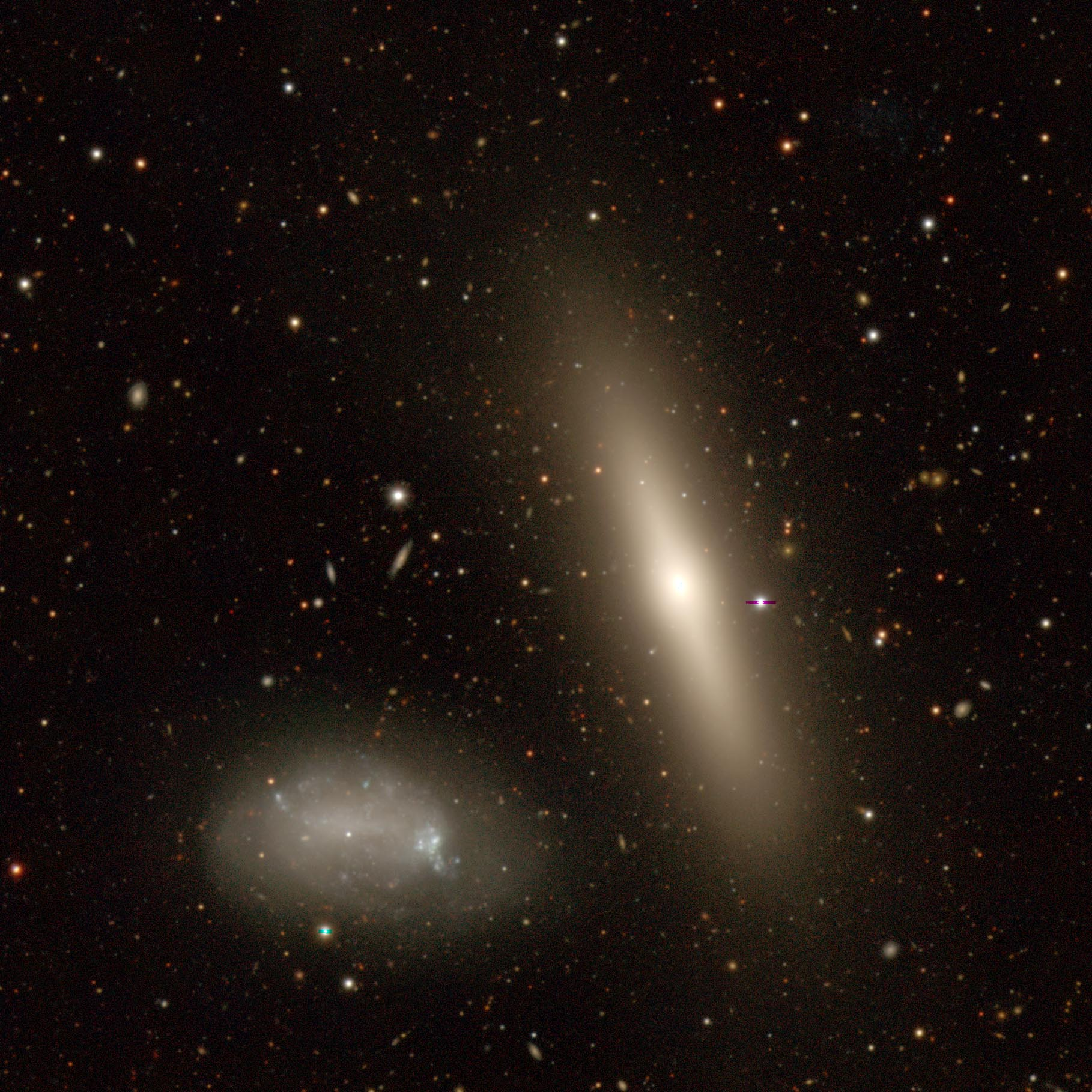
- NGC 1602 (left) by Legacy Surveys dr10

Observation data (J2000 epoch)
- Constellation: Dorado
- Right ascension: 04^{h} 27^{m} 54.9^{s}
- Declination: −55° 03′ 28″
- Redshift: 0.005230 ± 0.000027
- Heliocentric radial velocity: 1,568 ± 8 km/s
- Distance: 66.2 ± 4.2 Mly (20.3 ± 1.3 Mpc)
- Group or cluster: Dorado Group
- Apparent magnitude (V): 12.9

Characteristics
- Type: IB(s)m pec:
- Apparent size (V): 1.9′ × 1.1′
- Notable features: Interacting with NGC 1596

Other designations
- ESO 157-32, AM 0426-550, IRAS04267-5510, PGC 15168

NGC 1602 is a barred irregular galaxy in the constellation Dorado. The galaxy lies about 65 million light years away from Earth, which means, given its apparent dimensions, that NGC 1602 is approximately 50,000 light years across. It was discovered by John Herschel on December 5, 1834. It is a member of the Dorado Group.

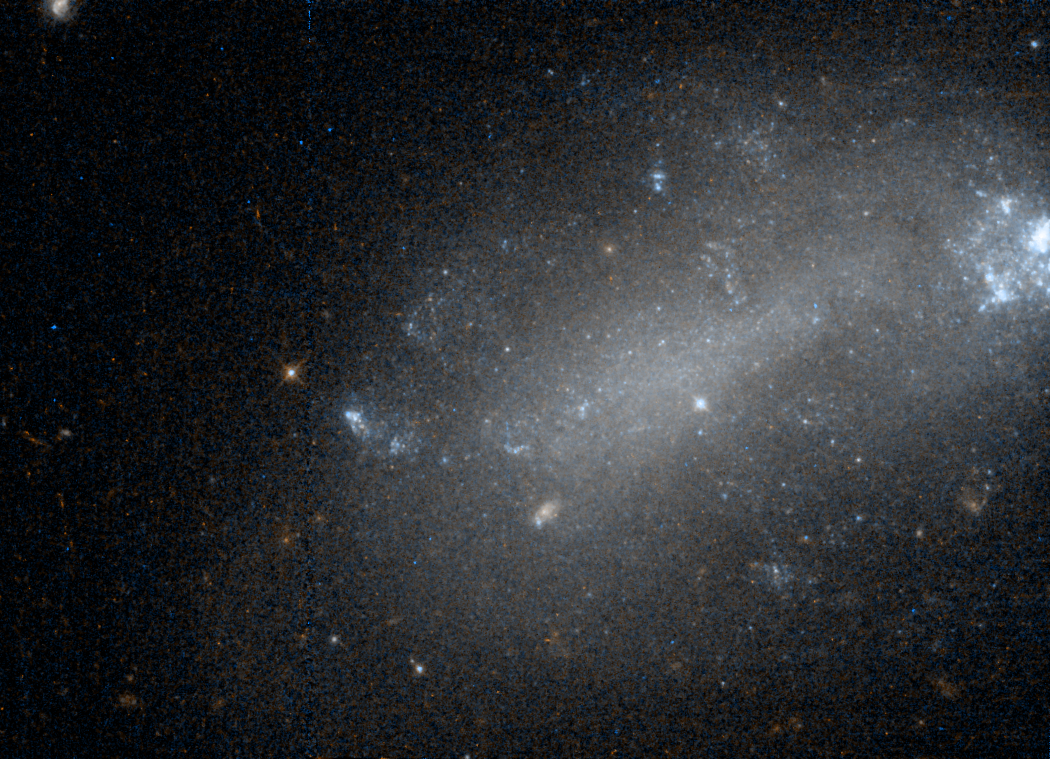
NGC 1602 by the Hubble Space Telescope.

NGC 1602 has been categorised as a magellanic spiral galaxy in The Carnegie Atlas of Galaxies. It features many knots which correspond to bright HII regions. The shape of the galaxy in ultraviolet appears as irregular as the optical one. NGC 1602 appears distorted in radiowaves, with the halo extending to and nearly overlapping with nearby NGC 1596. The separation of the two galaxies is 3 arcminutes. In H-alpha + [N II] a ring and a large complex of HII regions are visible west of the nucleus. The hydrogen morphology and kinematics are regular within the stellar disk.

NGC 1602 is surrounded by an extended hydrogen envelope, measuring 11.9 by 13.4 arcminutes across as imaged in the hydrogen line with an estimated total mass of (2.5±0.1)×10^{9} M_{☉}. The hydrogen imaging shows two tidal tails, one to the north north-west and the other one to the north north-east of NGC 1602, that is indicative of interaction with NGC 1596. The interaction started less than one billion years ago and NGC 1596 has accreted some of the hydrogen.
