= NGC 5278 =

Galaxy in the constellation Ursa Major

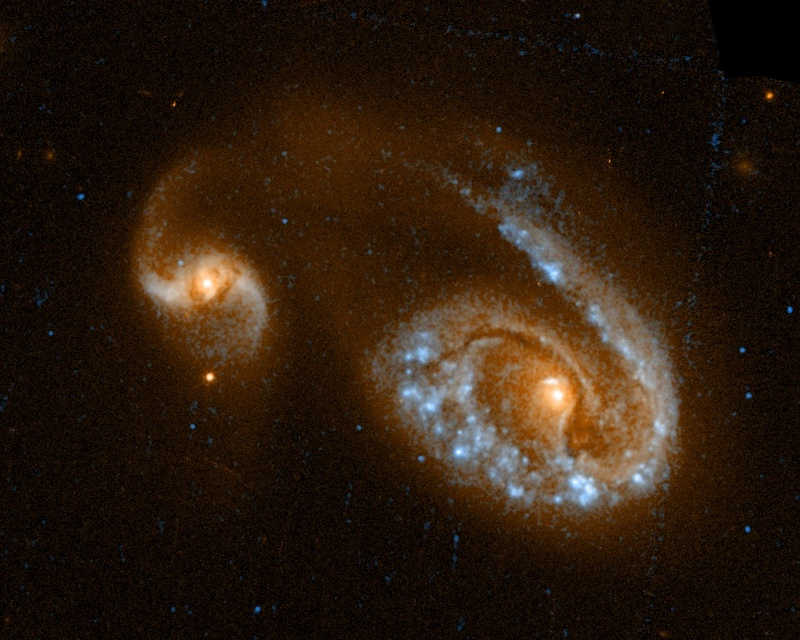
- NGC 5278 (right) imaged by the Hubble Space Telescope

Observation data (J2000 epoch)
- Constellation: Ursa Major
- Right ascension: 13^{h} 41^{m} 39.618^{s}
- Declination: +55° 40′ 14.341″
- Apparent magnitude (B): 13.6
- Surface brightness: 21.72 mag/arcsec2

Other designations
- IRAS 13397+5555, Arp 239 NED01, UGC 8677, MCG +09-22-101, Mrk 0271b, PGC 48473, CGCG 271-058 NED01, VV 019a

NGC 5278 is a spiral galaxy in the constellation Ursa Major. It was discovered by German-British astronomer William Herschel in 1789.

NGC 5278 is in gravitational interaction with the galaxy NGC 5279. This pair of galaxies appears in the Halton Arp's Atlas of Peculiar Galaxies under the symbol Arp 239. The luminosity class of NGC 5278 is II. The nucleus of this galaxy presents a burst of star formation (SBNG starburst nucleus galaxies) and it is an active Seyfert 2 type galaxy. In addition, NGC 5278 is possibly a LINER galaxy, a galaxy whose nucleus presents an emission spectrum characterized by broad lines of weakly ionized atoms. NGC 5278 is also a galaxy whose core shines in the ultraviolet spectrum. It is listed in the Markarian catalog under the reference Mrk 271 (MK 271).

== Supernovae ==
Two supernovae have been observed in NGC 5278: SN 2001ai (type Ic, mag. 17.6) and SN 2019cec (type II, mag. 18.26a).

== See also ==
- List of NGC objects (5001–6000)
- New General Catalogue
