= NGC 191A =

Lenticular galaxy in the constellation Cetus

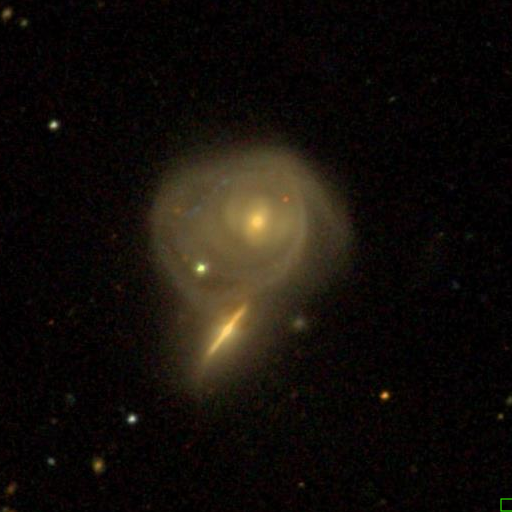
- SDSS image of NGC 191A (below) and NGC 191 (above)

Observation data (J2000 epoch)
- Constellation: Cetus
- Right ascension: 00^{h} 39^{m} 00.2^{s}
- Declination: −09° 00′ 52″
- Redshift: 6131 km/s
- Heliocentric radial velocity: 0.020452
- Distance: 290.82 ± 35.34 Mly (89.167 ± 10.835 Mpc)
- Apparent magnitude (B): 15

Characteristics
- Type: S0 pec
- Apparent size (V): 0.83′ × 0.43′

Other designations
- IC 1563, MCG -02-02-076, PGC 2332

NGC 191A (also PGC 2332, IC 1563, MCG -2-2-76 of ARP 127) is a lenticular galaxy in the constellation Cetus.

== Supernova ==
One supernova has been observed in NGC 191A. SN 2006ej (Type Ia, mag. 16.4) was discovered by Lick Observatory Supernova Search (LOSS) on 23 August 2006.

== See also ==
- List of NGC objects
