= NGC 5279 =

Galaxy in the constellation Ursa Major

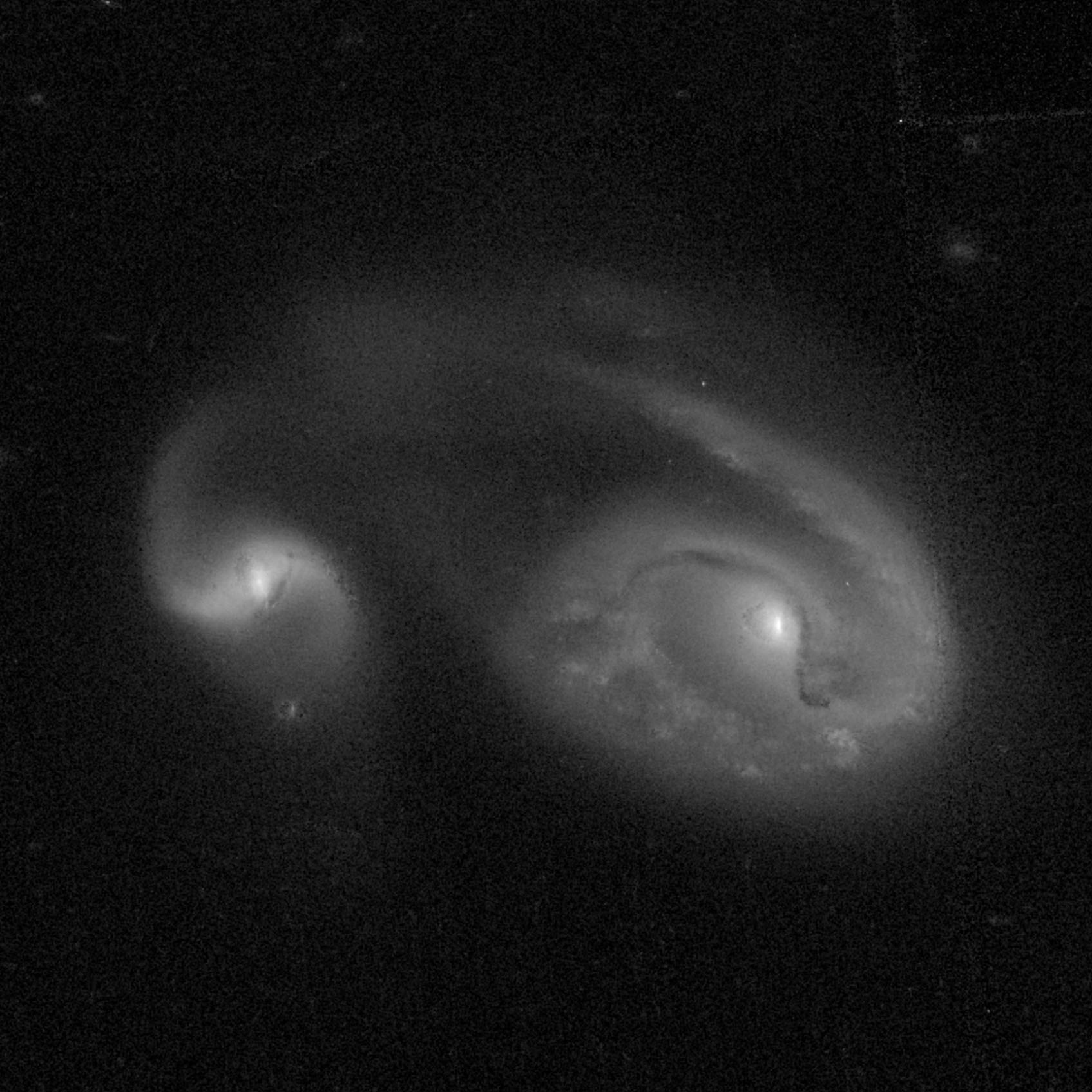
- NGC 5279 (left) by the Hubble Space Telescope

Observation data (J2000 epoch)
- Constellation: Ursa Major
- Right ascension: 13^{h} 41^{m} 43.79^{s}
- Declination: +55° 40′ 26.1″
- Surface brightness: 21.98 mag/arcsec2

Characteristics
- Type: SBa

NGC 5279 is a spiral galaxy in the constellation Ursa Major. It was discovered by German-British astronomer William Herschel in 1789. NGC 5279 is in gravitational interaction with the galaxy NGC 5278. This pair of galaxies appears in Halton Arp's Atlas of Peculiar Galaxies under the designation Arp 239. The luminosity class of NGC 5279 is I1. NGC 5279 is a galaxy whose core shines in the ultraviolet region. It is listed in the Markarian catalog under the designation Mrk 271 (MK 271).

== NGC 5278 Group ==
According to Abraham Mahtessian, NGC 5278 and UGC 8671 form a pair of galaxies. Mahtessian further mentions that NGC 5278 and NGC 5279 form a pair of galaxies. In reality, these galaxies therefore form a trio of galaxies, the group of NGC 5278. The other galaxy in the same region of the celestial sphere is PGC 48439. With a radial speed of 11,939 km/s, this galaxy is almost two times further away than the members of this trio.

== See also ==
- List of NGC objects (5001–6000)
- Lists of galaxies
- Astrophysics
