= Susan Kayser =

American astronomer

Susan Elizabeth Kayser
- Education: Radcliffe College; California Institute of Technology
- Known for: Development of the Gemini Observatory
- Spouse: Boris Kayser
- Scientific career
- Fields: Astronomy; Astrophysics
- Thesis: Photometry of the nearby irregular galaxy, NGC 6822
- Doctoral advisors: Halton Arp, Jesse L. Greenstein

Susan Kayser is an American astronomer. She was the first woman to receive a PhD in astrophysics from the California Institute of Technology, which attracted some media attention at the time. Her thesis research included the most thorough study of the irregular galaxy NGC 6822 until 2002. She spent her career with NASA working on the Helios and International Cometary Explorer (later called the International Sun-Earth Explorer-3) spacecraft radio astronomy experiments and with the National Science Foundation working on the Gemini Observatory.
