= Bubble Nebula (NGC 6822) =

Nebula in Barnard's Galaxy in the constellation Sagittarius

Bubble Nebula in Barnard's Galaxy
Emission nebula
- H II region
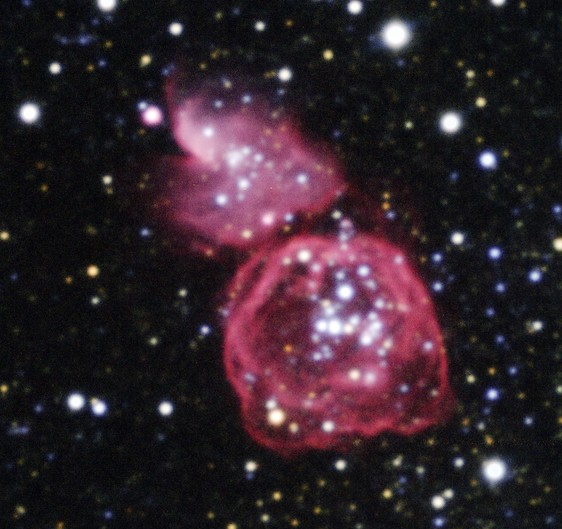
- The Bubble Nebula (upper left) seen with the Ring Nebula (lower right)

Observation data: J2000 epoch
- Right ascension: 19^{h} 44^{m} 31.8^{s}
- Declination: −14° 41′ 57″
- Distance: 1.63 ± 0.03 Mly (500 ± 10 kpc) ly
- Apparent magnitude (V): 15
- Apparent dimensions (V): 48″ × 32″
- Constellation: Sagittarius

Physical characteristics
- Radius: ~379 ly (116.3 pc) (estimated) ly
- Designations: Hubble 1925 I, Hubble I, MCG -02-50-002, IRAS 19417-1449, Hodge 2, PGC 63596

The Bubble Nebula in Barnard's Galaxy has the official designation of Hubble 1925 I as it was the first (Roman numeral 1) object recorded in a paper by Hubble 1925. It includes areas of bright H II emission. It is located north-west of the larger Hubble 1925 III.

== See also ==
- Ring Nebula (NGC 6822)
