= NGC 6822 =

Galaxy in the constellation Sagittarius

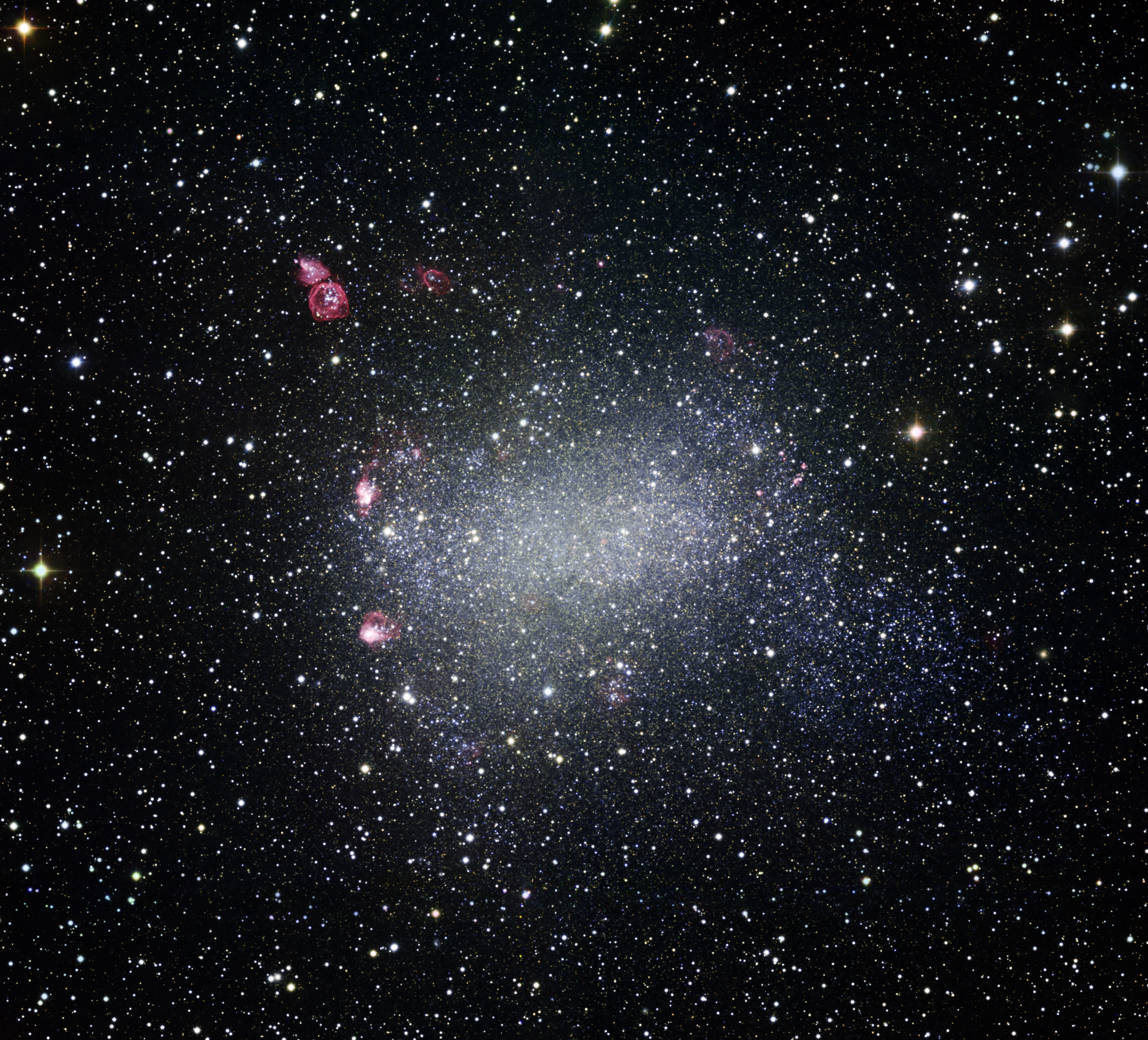
- NGC 6822 imaged by ESO's Wide Field Imager at La Silla Observatory

Observation data (J2000 epoch)
- Constellation: Sagittarius
- Right ascension: 19^{h} 44^{m} 57.70^{s}
- Declination: −14° 48′ 12.0″
- Redshift: −0.000183±0.00000667
- Heliocentric radial velocity: −55 ± 2 km/s (−34.2 ± 1.2 mi/s)
- Distance: 1.63 ± 0.03 Mly (500 ± 10 kpc)
- Apparent magnitude (V): 9.3

Characteristics
- Type: IB(s)m
- Size: ~9,200 ly (2.82 kpc) (estimated)
- Apparent size (V): 15.5′ × 13.5′

Other designations
- Barnard's Galaxy, DDO 209, IRAS 19420-1450, IC 4895, MCG -02-50-006, PGC 63616, C 57

NGC 6822 (also known as Barnard's Galaxy, IC 4895, or Caldwell 57) is a barred irregular galaxy approximately 1.6 million light-years away in the constellation Sagittarius. Part of the Local Group of galaxies, it was discovered by E. E. Barnard on 17 August 1884, with a six-inch refractor telescope. It is the closest non-satellite galaxy to the Milky Way, but lies just outside its virial radius. It is similar in structure and composition to the Small Magellanic Cloud. It is about 7,000 light-years in diameter.

== Observational history ==
NGC 6822 was discovered by E. E. Barnard in 1884 using a six-inch refractor telescope.

Edwin Hubble, in the paper N.G.C. 6822, A Remote Stellar System, identified 15 variable stars (11 of which were Cepheids) of this galaxy. He also surveyed the galaxy's stars distribution down to magnitude 19.4. He provided spectral characteristics, luminosities and dimensions for the five brightest "diffuse nebulae" (giant H II regions) that included the Bubble Nebula and the Ring Nebula. He also computed the absolute magnitude of the entire galaxy.

Hubble's detection of eleven Cepheid variable stars was a milestone in astronomy. Utilizing the Cepheid Period-Luminosity relationship, Hubble determined a distance of 214 kiloparsecs or 698,000 light-years. This was the first system beyond the Magellanic Clouds to have its distance determined. (Hubble continued this process with the Andromeda Galaxy and the Triangulum Galaxy). This distance to the galaxy was way beyond Harlow Shapley's value of 300,000 light-years for the size of the universe. In the paper, Hubble concluded the "Great Debate" of 1920 between Heber Curtis and Shapley over the scale of the universe and the nature of the "spiral nebula". It soon became evident that all spiral nebulae were in fact spiral galaxies far outside our own Milky Way.

An analysis of Hubble's plates by Susan Kayser in 1966 remained the most complete study of this galaxy until 2002.

In 1977, Paul W. Hodge extended the list of known H II regions in Barnard to 16. Today, there are over 150 of these regions catalogued in Barnard's Galaxy.

== Star formation ==
Observations of the galaxy show stars-forming in the dense cores of giant clouds of molecular hydrogen gas, cold enough to collapse under its own gravity. The distribution of hydrogen gas is disk-shaped, but mysteriously, it is angled at about 60° relative to the stellar distribution. Most of its stars formed within the last 3 to 5 billion years.

NGC 6822 has spent most of its life in relative isolation. However, it likely passed within the virial radius of the Milky Way some 3 to 4 billion years ago, which may be coincident with its increase in star formation.

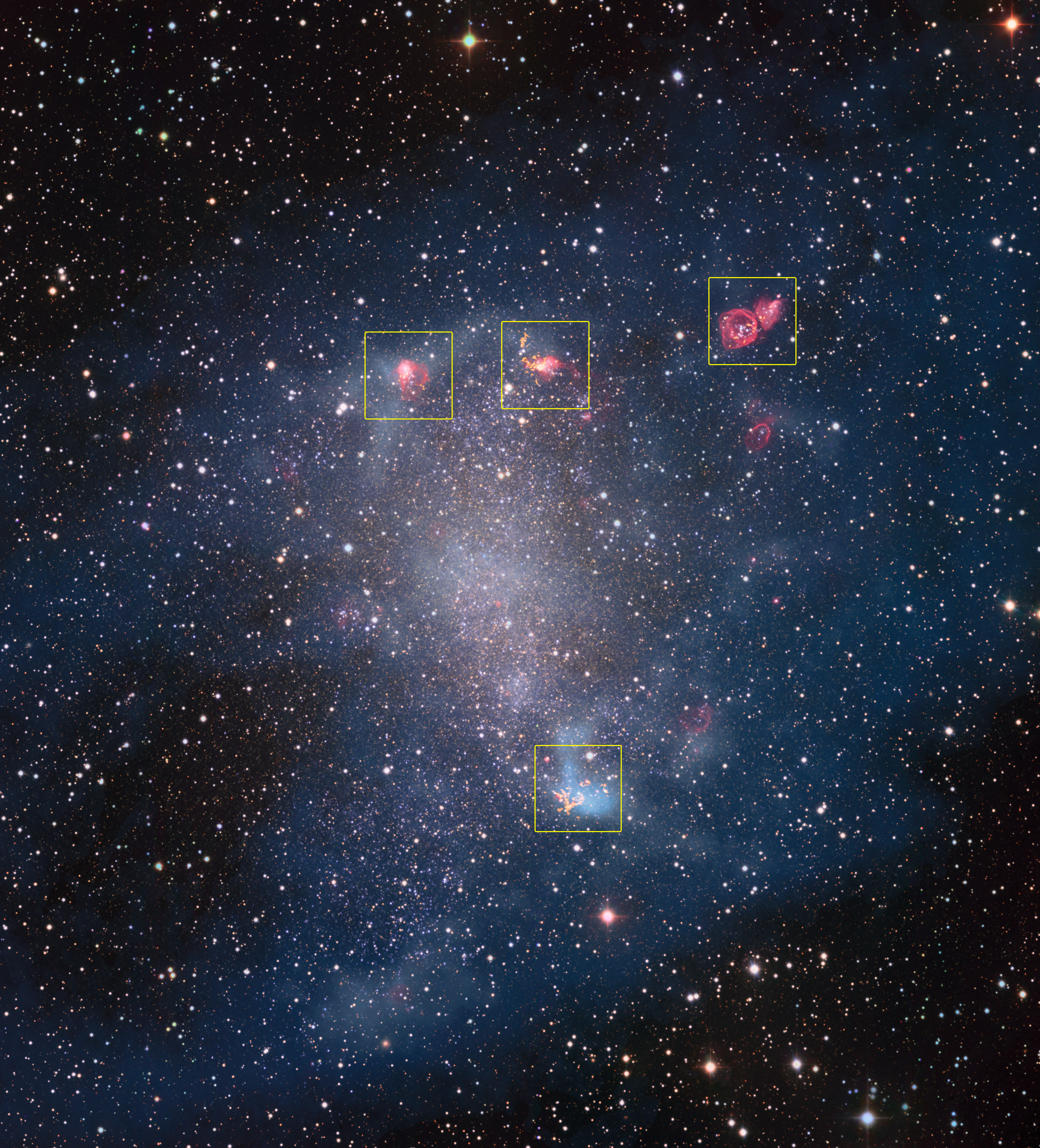
Composite image from data by 2.2-meter MPG/ESO and ALMA with star-forming regions identified.

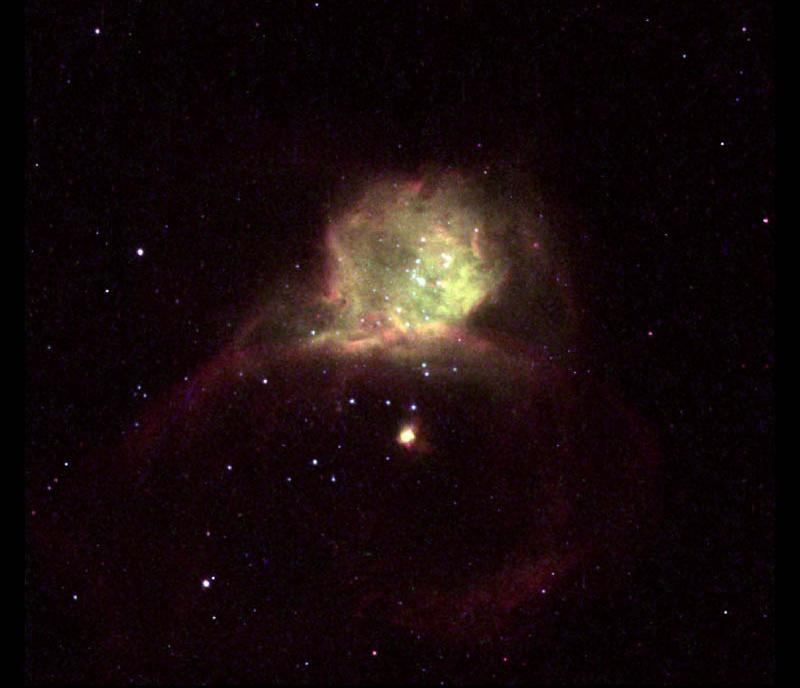
The Hubble-X Star-forming region.

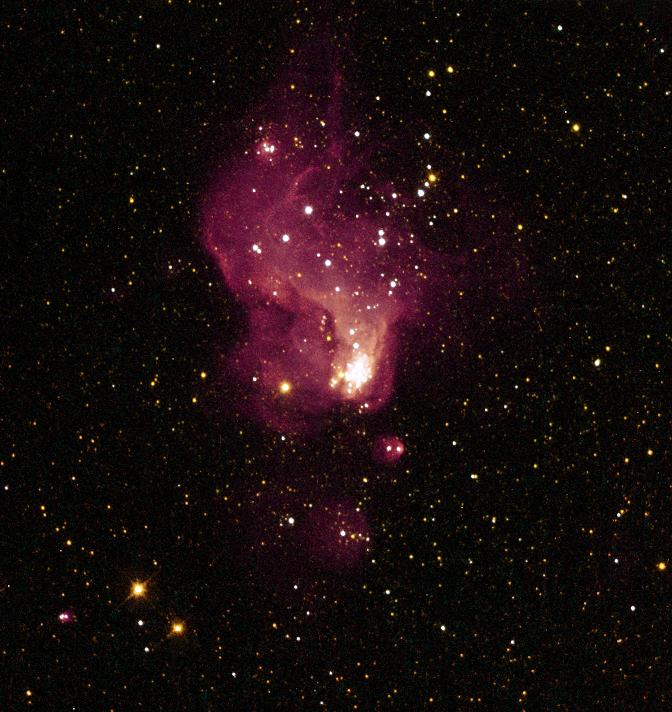
Closeup of another star-forming region

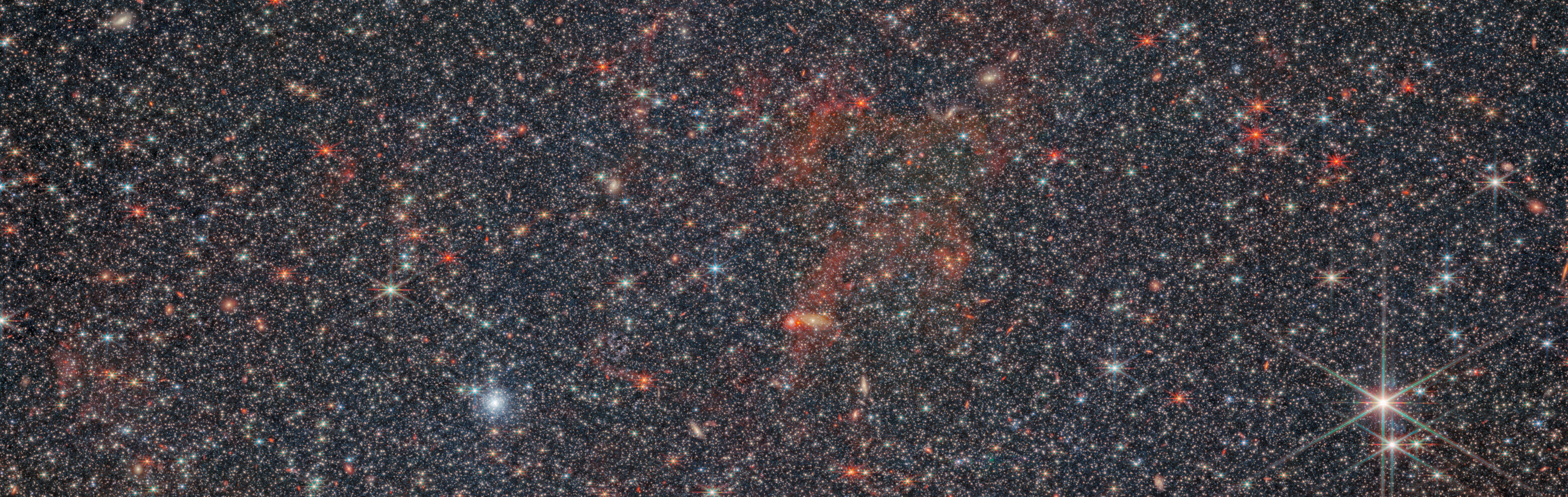
NASA/ESA/CSA James Webb Space Telescope image of NGC 6822

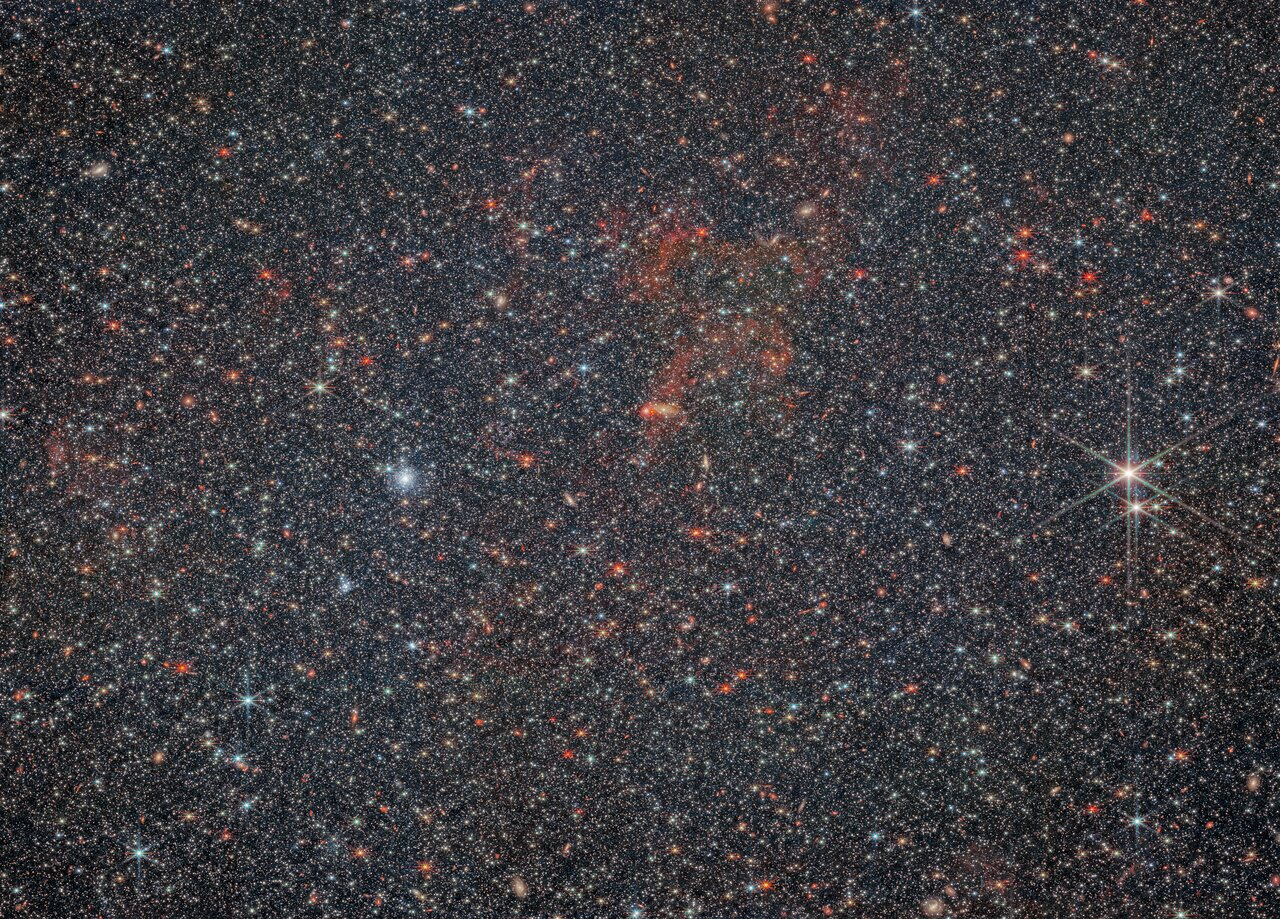
JWST NIRCam’s view of NGC 6822

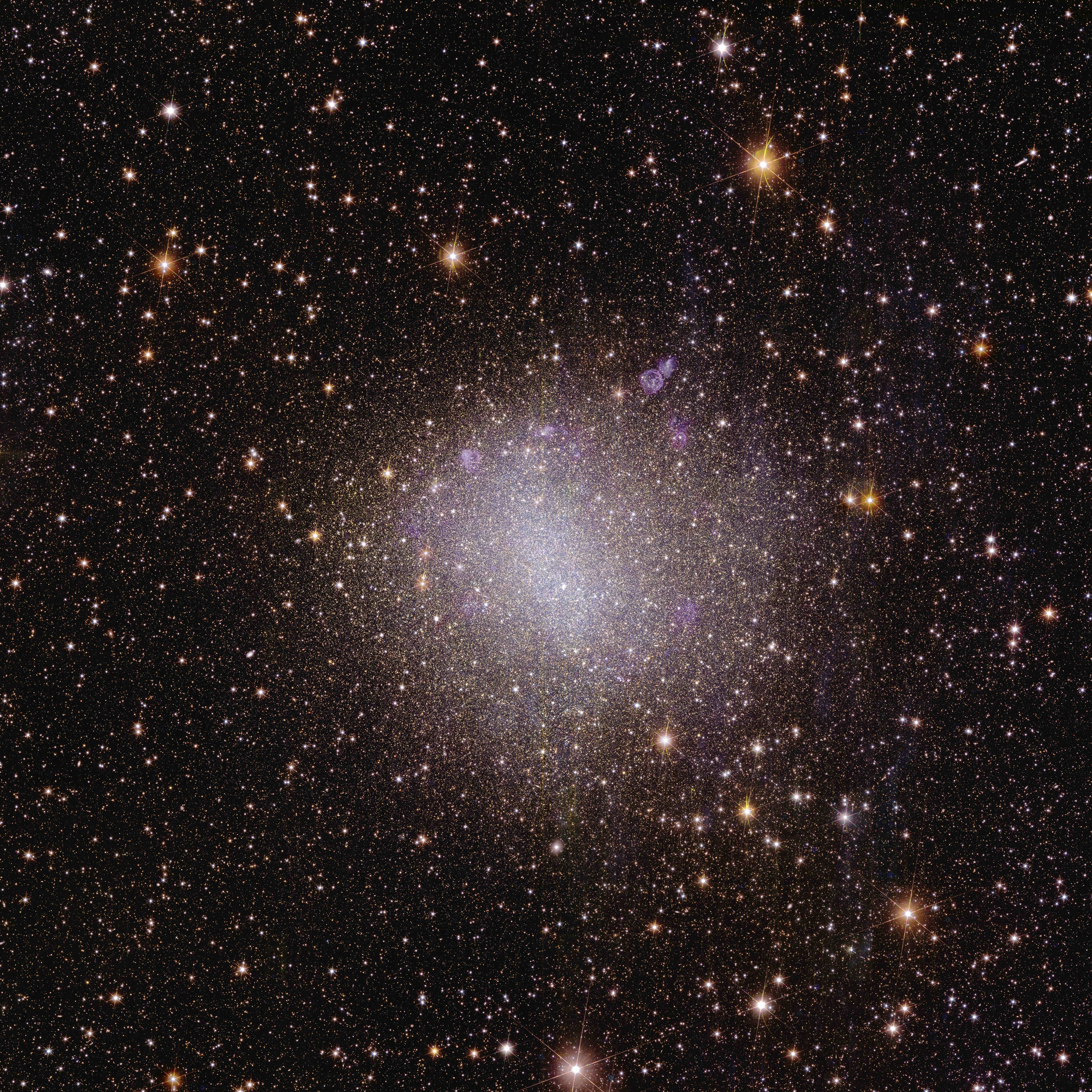
NGC 6822 imaged by the Euclid Space Telescope

== See also ==
- Large Magellanic Cloud, another irregular galaxy within the Local Group
- List of NGC objects (6001–7000)

== Sources ==
- Cannon, John M.; Walter, Fabian; Armus, Lee; Bendo, George J.; Calzetti, Daniela; Draine, Bruce T.; Engelbracht, Charles W.; Helou, George; et al. (December 2006), "The Nature of Infrared Emission in the Local Group Dwarf Galaxy NGC 6822 as Revealed by Spitzer", The Astrophysical Journal, vol. 652, no. 2, pp. 1170–1187, arXiv:astro-ph/0608249, Bibcode:2006ApJ...652.1170C, doi:10.1086/508341, S2CID 10287455
- Hubble, Edwin P. (December 1925), "NGC 6822, a remote stellar system", Astrophysical Journal, vol. 62, pp. 409–433, Bibcode:1925ApJ....62..409H, doi:10.1086/142943
- Karachentsev, I. D.; Karachentseva, V. E.; Hutchmeier, W. K.; Makarov, D. I. (April 2004), "A Catalog of Neighboring Galaxies", Astronomical Journal, vol. 127, no. 4, pp. 2031–2068, Bibcode:2004AJ....127.2031K, doi:10.1086/382905
- Karachentsev, I. D.; Kashibadze, O. G. (January 2006), "Masses of the local group and of the M81 group estimated from distortions in the local velocity field", Astrophysics, vol. 49, no. 1, pp. 3–18, Bibcode:2006Ap.....49....3K, doi:10.1007/s10511-006-0002-6, S2CID 120973010
- Robert Burnham Jr., Burnham's Celestial Handbook: An observer's guide to the universe beyond the solar system, vol 3, p. 1559
