= Ring Nebula (NGC 6822) =

Emission nebula in Barnard's Galaxy

Ring Nebula in Barnard's Galaxy
Emission nebula
- H II region
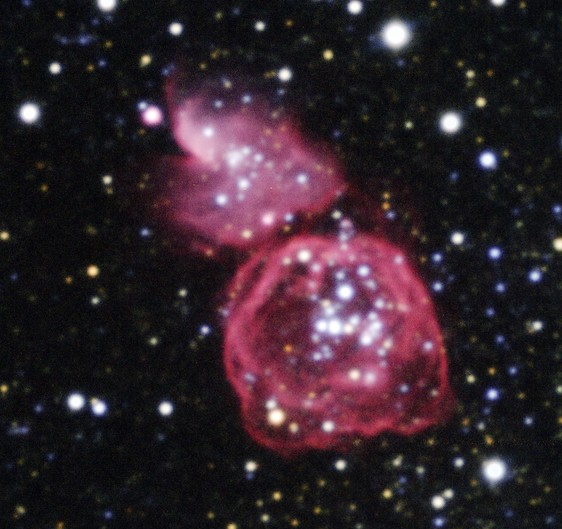
- The Ring Nebula (lower right) seen with the Bubble Nebula (upper left) as taken at the La Silla Observatory

Observation data: J2000.0 epoch
- Right ascension: 19^{h} 44^{m} 36^{s}
- Declination: −14° 41′ 42″
- Distance: 1.63 million ly (0.500 Mpc pc)
- Apparent magnitude (V): ~14.5
- Apparent dimensions (V): 53″
- Constellation: Sagittarius

Physical characteristics
- Radius: ~419 ly (128.4 pc) (estimated) ly
- Designations: Hubble 1925 III, Hodge 4, NGC 6822B, NGC 6822-2, IRAS 19421-1455, DDO 209, LEDA 63616, HIPASS J1944-14, 2MASX J19445619-1447512, IC 4895, MCG-02-50-006

The Ring Nebula in Barnard's Galaxy has the official designation of Hubble 1925 III as it was the third (Roman numeral 3) object recorded in Hubble's 1925 paper, N.G.C. 6822, A Remote Stellar System. It includes areas of bright H II emission. In Paul W. Hodge's 1977 paper it was designated Hodge 4.

Its appearance is very similar to the filamentary nebula found in the Large Magellanic Cloud (see Meaburn 1981). It most resembles the circular ring-like nebula N70 in the LMC.

In 1987 this object Hubble III in NGC 6822, was observed with the Manchester Echelle Spectrometer II.

== See also ==
- Bubble Nebula (NGC 6822)
- NGC 6822
