= Quasars, Redshifts and Controversies =

Book by Halton Arp

- Author: Halton Arp
- Language: English
- Publisher: Interstellar Media
- Publication date: 1987
- Publication place: United States
- Pages: 198
- ISBN: 9780941325004

Quasars, Redshifts and Controversies is a 1987 book by Halton Arp, an astronomer famous for his Atlas of Peculiar Galaxies (1966). Arp argued that many quasars with otherwise high redshift are somehow linked to close objects such as nearby galaxies. Arp also argued that some galaxies showed unusual redshifts, and that redshifts themselves could be quantized.

These are controversial views which do not accord with the standard model of physical cosmology. It also contradicts the accepted model that quasars are bright nuclei of very distant galaxies. Most astronomers reject Arp's interpretation of the data since the anomalous observations could be explained by perspective effects. Reportedly, some of Arp's calculations seem to be simply "bad mathematics". Arp asserted that many questions he posed to the scientific establishment are still unanswered and that his requests for more observation time had been systematically rejected.

Halton Arp's proposal was an idea based on analyses done before the sky surveys increased the number of measured redshifts by several orders of magnitude. The idea was that the cosmological redshift might be showing evidence of periodicity which would be difficult to explain in a Hubble's law universe that had the feature of continuous expansion. However, most astronomers agree that the analysis suffers from poor methodology and small number statistics.

Halton Arp continued to report the existence of apparently connected objects with very different redshifts. Arp has interpreted these connections to mean that these objects are in fact physically connected. He further hypothesized that the higher redshift objects are ejected from the lower redshift objects - which are usually active galactic nuclei (AGN)- and that the large observed redshifts of these "ejected" objects is dominated by a non-cosmological (intrinsic) component. The rest of the community regards these as chance alignments and Arp's hypothesis has very few supporters.

The book has been translated into Italian and Spanish, as of 1998.

His work is updated in his last book, Catalogue of Discordant Redshift Associations, C. Roy Keys Inc. (February, 2003), ISBN 978-0968368992.

== See also ==
- Non-standard cosmology

== External links and references ==
- Arp, Halton C., Quasars, Redshifts and Controversies. September 1988. ISBN 0-521-36314-4
- Arp, Halton C., Seeing Red: Redshifts, Cosmology and Academic Science, Aperion (August, 1998), ISBN 0-9683689-0-5
- Rowan-Robinson, Michael, Arp's astronomical exotica, Nature vol. 336, (November 17, 1988)
