= NGC 1596 =

Galaxy in the constellation Dorado

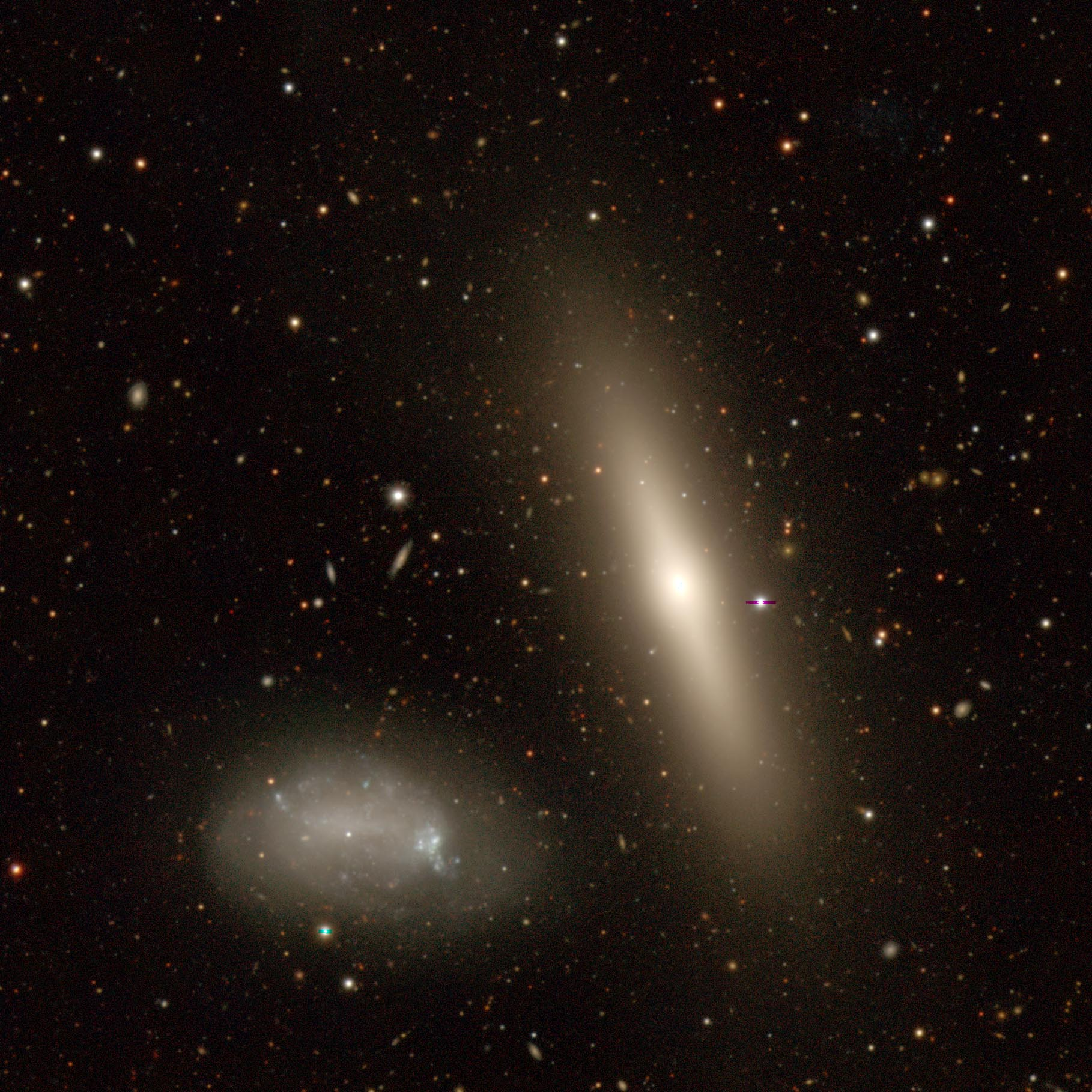
- NGC 1596 (right) by Legacy Surveys dr10

Observation data (J2000 epoch)
- Constellation: Dorado
- Right ascension: 04^{h} 27^{m} 38.1^{s}
- Declination: −55° 01′ 40″
- Redshift: 0.005037 ± 0.000027
- Heliocentric radial velocity: 1,510 ± 8 km/s
- Distance: 53.2 ± 16.1 Mly (16.3 ± 5.0 Mpc)
- Group or cluster: Dorado Group
- Apparent magnitude (V): 11.1

Characteristics
- Type: SA0:
- Apparent size (V): 3.7′ × 1.0′
- Notable features: Interacting with NGC 1602

Other designations
- ESO 157-31, AM 0426-550, PGC 15153

NGC 1596 is a lenticular galaxy in the constellation Dorado. The galaxy lies about 55 million light years away from Earth, which means, given its apparent dimensions, that NGC 1596 is approximately 55,000 light years across. It was discovered by John Herschel on December 5, 1834. It is a member of the Dorado Group.

The galaxy has a high-surface disk and a boxy bulge. The boxy bulge is indicative of the presence of a bar. The galaxy has an extended spheroidal envelope, which is more extending towards the southwest side than the northeast. The ionised gas kinematics show the presence of counter-rotating gas. The gas apparently was accreted by nearby galaxy NGC 1602 and has highly asymmetric distribution. The galaxy doesn't have HII regions, but there is extended Hα and [N II] emission.

NGC 1596 forms a pair with magellanic spiral galaxy NGC 1602, lying at a distance of 3.1 arcminutes. Hydrogen gas, as imaged in the hydrogen line (HI), has been found in an area around both galaxies and has two tidal tails, one to the north north-west and the other one to the north north-east of NGC 1602. The interaction started less than one billion years ago.
