= Boris Kayser =

American theoretical physicist (1938–2024)

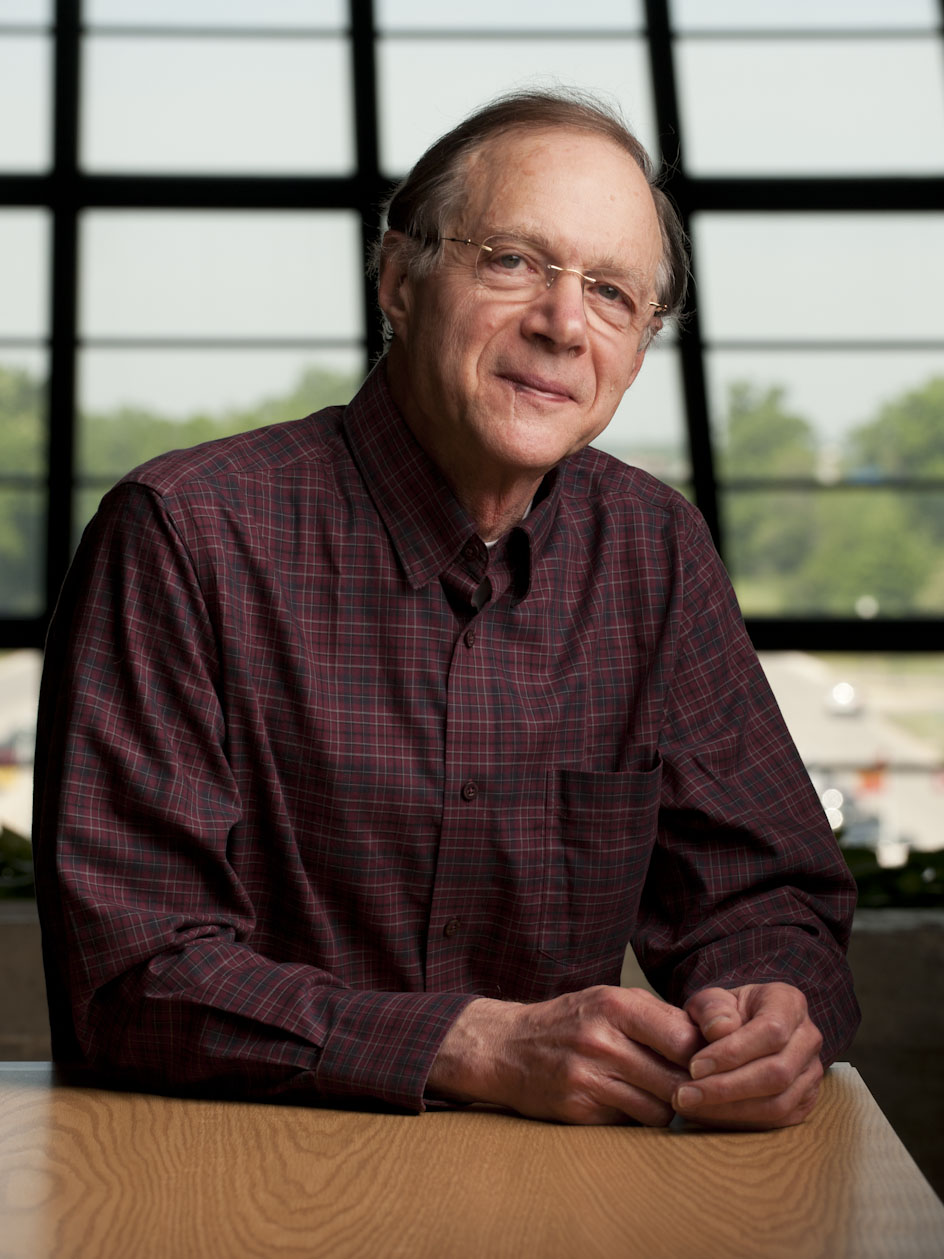
- Boris Kayser at his desk at Fermilab. (Photo: Reidar Hahn)
- Born: June 2, 1938
- Died: April 14, 2024 (aged 85)
- Citizenship: United States
- Education: Princeton University; California Institute of Technology
- Partner: Susan Kayser
- Scientific career
- Institutions: National Science Foundation; Fermilab
- Thesis: Dynamical Model of the Σ (1964)
- Doctoral advisor: Fredrik Zachariasen

Boris Jules Kayser (June 2, 1938 – April 14, 2024) was an American theoretical physicist. He specialized in the study of neutrinos. He worked at the National Science Foundation for nearly thirty years before joining the US government research facility Fermilab. He retired from Fermilab in 2012. For five years, he was the editor of the peer-reviewed journal the Annual Review of Nuclear and Particle Science.

== Early life and education ==
Kayser was born in 1938 to Saul and Dora Kayser and grew up on a chicken farm in New Jersey. He had two younger sisters, twins Leah and Marsha. While in high school, he was a finalist for the Westinghouse Science Talent Search in 1956. He graduated from Lakewood High School in 1956 as valedictorian. He attended Princeton University on full scholarship for his undergraduate degree, graduating as valedictorian with a degree in physics in 1960. He attended California Institute of Technology for his PhD in particle physics. His PhD advisor was Fredrik Zachariasen.

== Career ==
After a post-doctoral position at UC Berkeley, Kayser was an assistant professor at the State University of New York at Stony Brook from 1966 to 1969, when he joined the physics department at Northwestern University as associate professor. In 1972, Kayser joined the National Science Foundation, where he was the program director for theoretical physics. While there, he helped establish the Kavli Institute for Theoretical Physics at University of California, Santa Barbara. He became the editor of the Annual Review of Nuclear and Particle Science in 2004, taking over the role from Chris Quigg. He left the editor position in 2009. While working at NSF, he became interested in researching neutrinos and was principal author of a book, "The Physics of Massive Neutrinos". He retired from the NSF in 2001, after which he joined Fermilab as a distinguished guest scientist. His work on neutrinos at Fermilab was featured on the PBS science television series Nova, episode "The Ghost Particle". While at Fermilab, he served on a variety of committees, including the Particle Physics Project Prioritization Panel (2002–2007) and the Fermilab Physics Advisory Committee (2004–2008). In 2009, he was elected the chair of the American Physical Society's Division of Particles and Fields. He officially retired from Fermilab at the end of 2012.

== Personal life ==
Boris met Susan Kayser née Zimet in 1956 when they were both finalists for the Westinghouse Science Talent Search. They were at a house party for finalists hosted by former WSTS winner, Nobel laureate Roald Hoffman. He and Susan married in 1960 at Congregation Ahavat Israel.

Boris Kayser died on April 14, 2024, at the age of 85.
