= NGC 838 =

Galaxy in the constellation Cetus

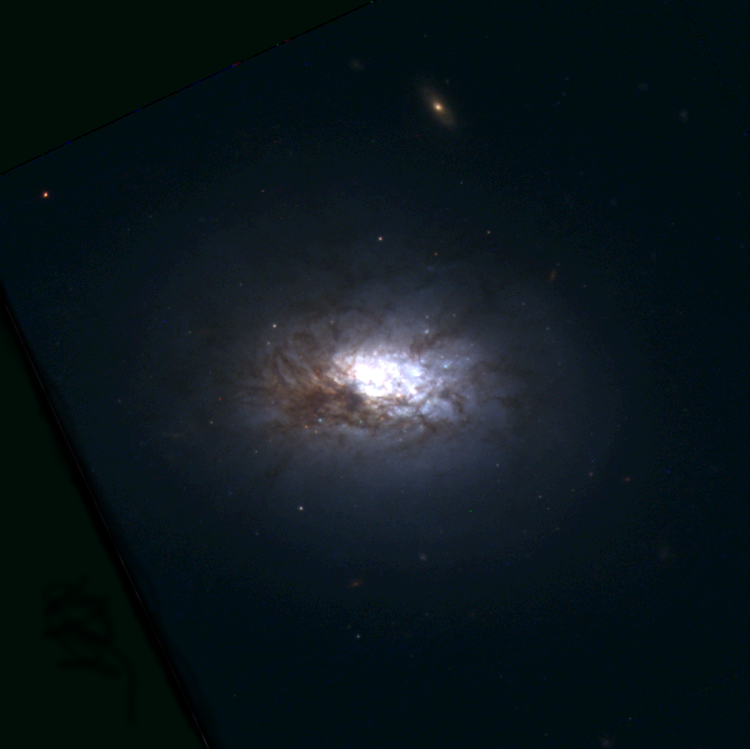
- HST image of NGC 838

Observation data (J2000 epoch)
- Constellation: Cetus
- Right ascension: 02^{h} 09^{m} 38.562^{s}
- Declination: −10° 08′ 46.12″
- Redshift: 0.01284
- Heliocentric radial velocity: 3825 ± 3 km/s
- Distance: 167.5 Mly (51.37 Mpc)
- Apparent magnitude (V): 12.91
- Apparent magnitude (B): 13.53

Characteristics
- Type: SA(rs)0^{0} pec:

Other designations
- MCG -02-06-033, Mrk 1022, PGC 8250

NGC 838 is an unbarred lenticular galaxy located at approximately 170 million light-years away in the constellation of Cetus. It is part of the Hickson Compact Group 16.

== Supernova ==
One supernova has been observed in NGC 838: SN 2005H (Type II, mag. 15.9) was discovered by the Lick Observatory Supernova Search (LOSS) on 15 January 2005.

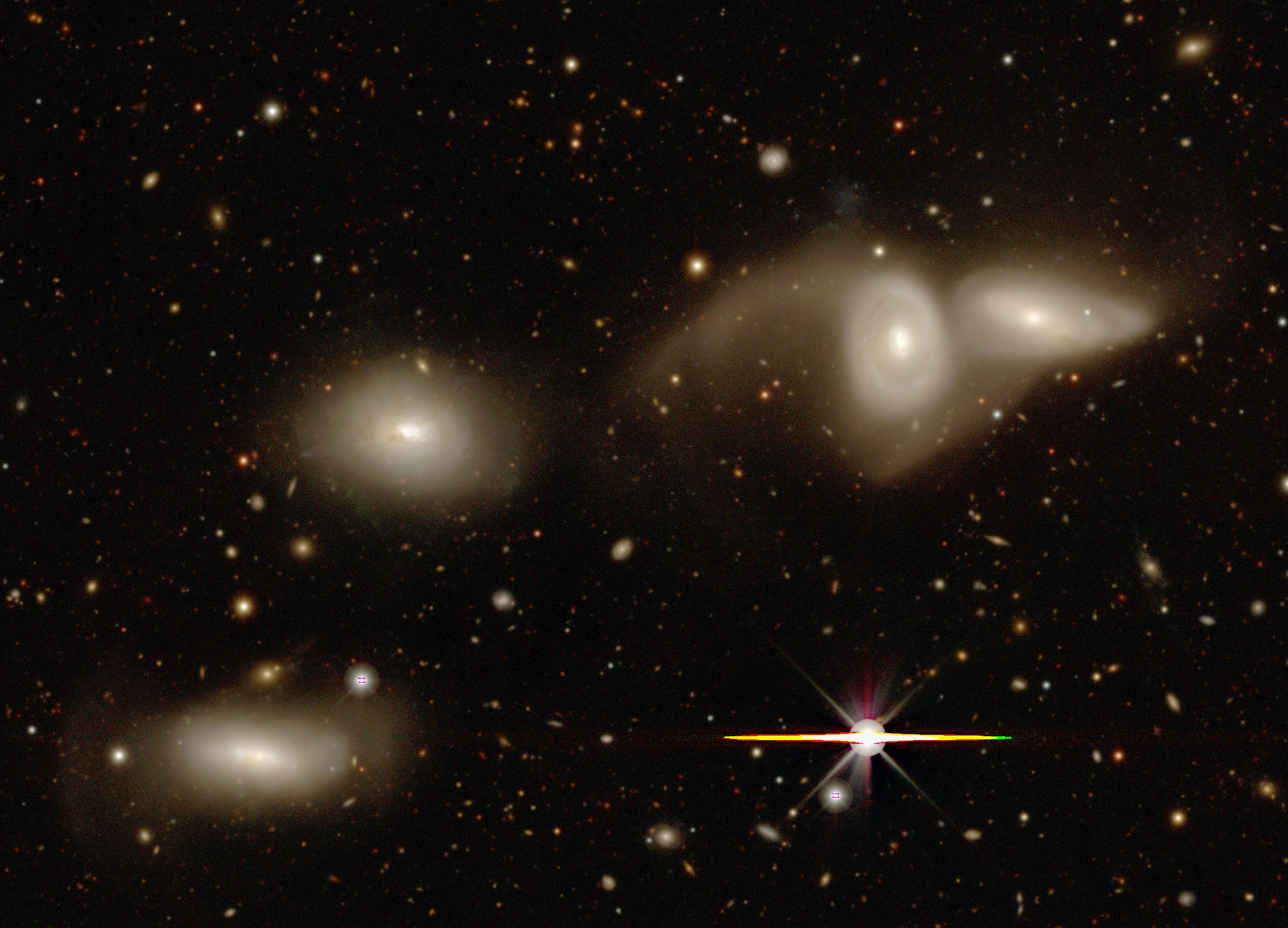
NGC 838 and other galaxies in this group. From right to left: NGC 833, NGC 835, NGC 838 and NGC 839
