= Barred irregular galaxy =

Irregular version of a barred spiral galaxy

The Large Magellanic Cloud, an example of a barred irregular galaxy

A barred irregular galaxy is an irregular version of a barred spiral galaxy. They have a bar-shaped structure in the middle of an otherwise irregular shape. Examples include the Large Magellanic Cloud (LMC) and NGC 6822, although LMC is more often classified as a magellanic spiral galaxy. Some barred irregular galaxies (like the Large Magellanic Cloud) may be dwarf spiral galaxies, which have been distorted into an irregular shape by tidal interactions with a more massive neighbor.

== Classification and Formation ==
Barred irregular galaxies are part of a broader classification of galaxies that do not fit neatly into the Hubble sequence of elliptical and spiral galaxies. The presence of a central bar is a significant feature, as bars are found in approximately two-thirds of all spiral galaxies. These bars are thought to form from density waves that reshape the orbits of stars near the galactic center.

The irregular shape of these galaxies is often a result of gravitational interactions with other, larger galaxies. When a smaller galaxy, such as a dwarf spiral, passes close to a more massive one, the tidal forces can strip away stars and gas, creating tidal tails and disrupting the galaxy's morphology. This process can transform a regular spiral galaxy into an irregular one, and if the original galaxy was a barred spiral, it would become a barred irregular galaxy.
