= NGC 839 =

Galaxy in the constellation of Cetus

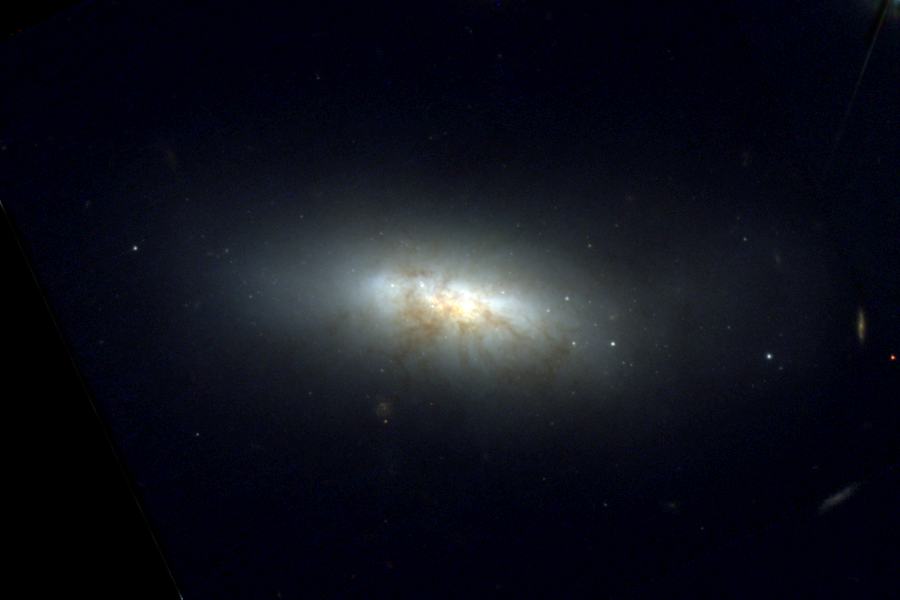
- HST image of NGC 839

Observation data (J2000 epoch)
- Constellation: Cetus
- Right ascension: 02^{h} 09^{m} 42.929^{s}
- Declination: −10° 11′ 02.71″
- Redshift: 0.012916
- Heliocentric radial velocity: 3847 km/s
- Distance: 174.3 ± 12.2 Mly (53.44 ± 3.75 Mpc)
- Apparent magnitude (V): 11.42
- Apparent magnitude (B): 13.98

Characteristics
- Type: S0: pec

Other designations
- MCG -02-06-034, PGC 8254

NGC 839 is a lenticular galaxy located in the constellation Cetus. It was discovered November 28, 1785 in a sky survey by Wilhelm Herschel. It is one of the galaxies that are part of the quadruplet family HGC 16, along with the unbarred lenticular galaxy NGC 838.

NGC 839 is a luminous infrared galaxy (LIRG) that shows signs of high amounts of star formation; therefore, it is also classified as a starburst galaxy. It is similar in appearance to Messier 82, suggesting a similar formation history.
