= Halton Arp =

American astronomer (1927-2013)

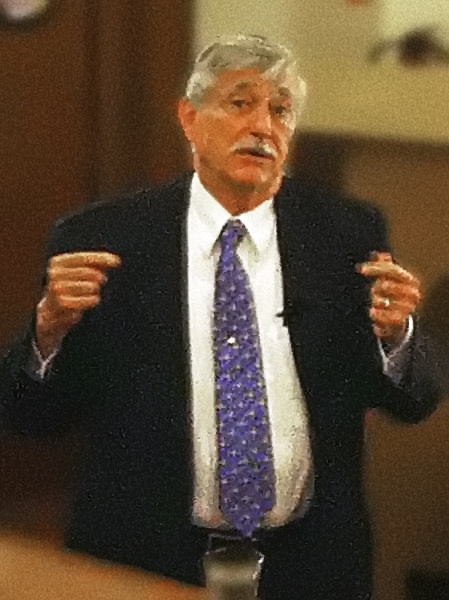
- Halton Arp in London, October 2000
- Born: March 21, 1927; New York City, United States
- Died: December 28, 2013 (aged 86); Munich, Germany
- Education: California Institute of Technology
- Known for: Intrinsic redshift Atlas of Peculiar Galaxies
- Awards: Newcomb Cleveland Prize (1960); Helen B. Warner Prize for Astronomy (1960)
- Scientific career
- Fields: Astronomy
- Workplaces: Palomar Observatory; Max Planck Institute for Astrophysics
- Doctoral advisor: Walter Baade
- Doctoral students: Susan Kayser
- Website: www.haltonarp.com

Halton Christian "Chip" Arp (March 21, 1927 – December 28, 2013) was an American astronomer. He is remembered for his 1966 book Atlas of Peculiar Galaxies, which catalogued unusual-looking galaxies and presented their images.

Arp was also known as a critic of the Big Bang theory and for advocating a non-standard cosmology incorporating intrinsic redshift. Arp developed those views in a book, Seeing Red: Redshift, Cosmology and Academic Science, in 1998.

== Biography ==
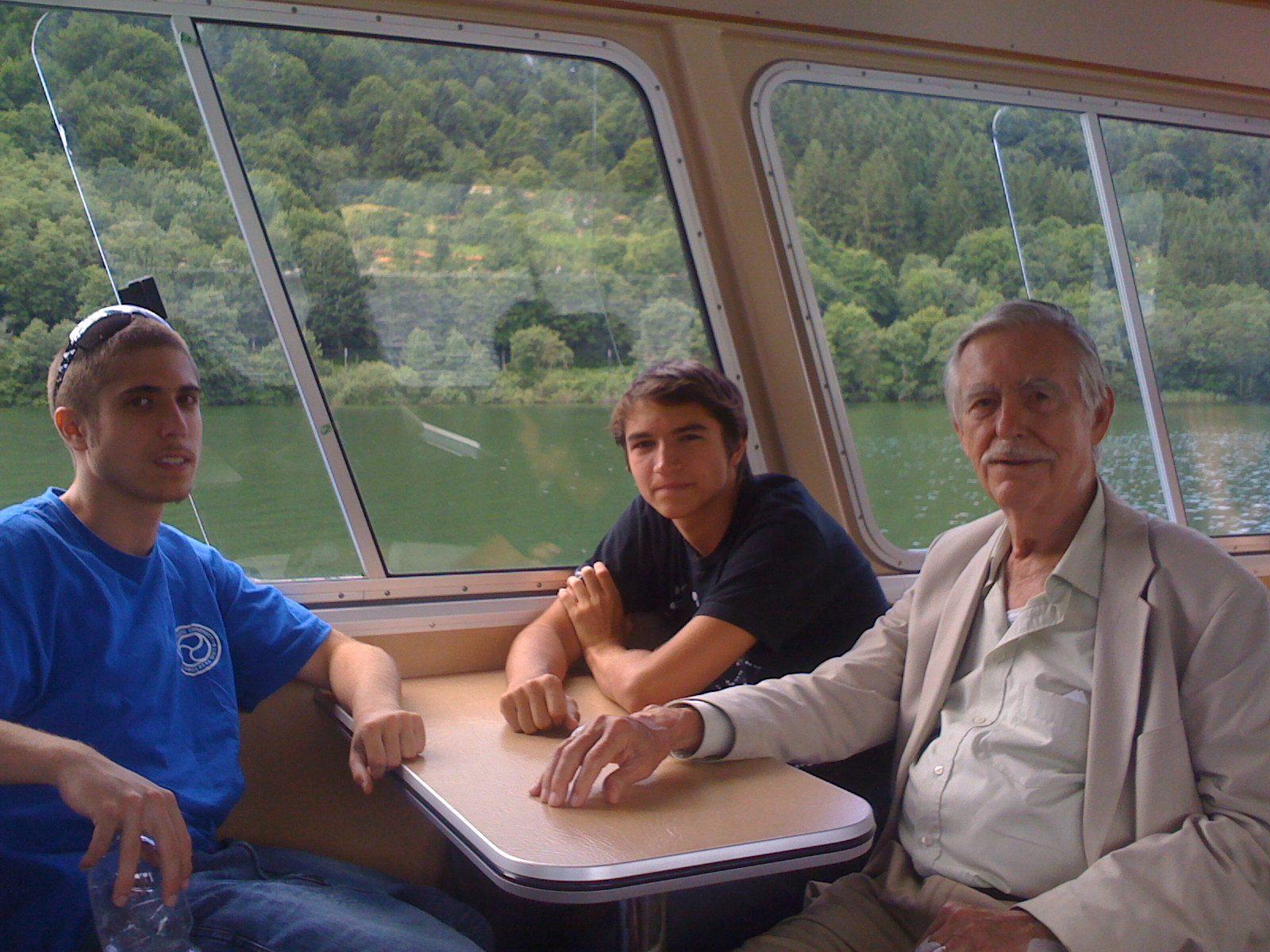
Halton Arp (right) and his grandsons, 2008

Arp was born on March 21, 1927, in New York City. He was married three times and has four daughters, including comic artist Andrice Arp, and five grandchildren.

His bachelor's degree was awarded by Harvard (1949), and his PhD by Caltech (1953). Afterward he became a Fellow of the Carnegie Institution of Washington in 1953, performing research at the Mount Wilson Observatory and Palomar Observatory. Arp became a research assistant at Indiana University in 1955, and then in 1957 became a staff member at Palomar Observatory, where he worked for 29 years. In 1983 he stopped obtaining observing time on the Palomar telescopes, due in part to his unorthodox theories but also because he refused to submit observing proposals, on the grounds that everybody knew what he was doing. As a reaction, he took early retirement and joined the staff of the Max Planck Institute for Astrophysics in Germany.

He died in Munich, Germany, on December 28, 2013. He was an atheist.

== Atlas of Peculiar Galaxies ==
Arp 230, also known as IC 51, observed by the NASA/ESA Hubble Space Telescope.

Arp compiled a catalog of unusual galaxies titled Atlas of Peculiar Galaxies, which was first published in 1966. Arp's motivation for the project was his realization that astronomers understood little about how galaxies change over time. The atlas was intended to provide images that would give astronomers data from which they could study the evolution of galaxies. Arp later used the galaxies in the atlas as arguments for his views in the debate on quasi-stellar objects (QSOs).

Astronomers now recognize Arp's atlas as an excellent compilation of interacting and merging galaxies, with some admixture of chance alignments of two unrelated objects at vastly different distances. Many objects in the atlas are referred to primarily by Arp number, and some (particularly Arp 220) are used as spectral templates for studying high-redshift galaxies. Arp himself totally rejected the idea that the peculiar galaxies were merging, claiming, rather, that apparent associations were prime examples of ejections from a host galaxy.

== Quasars and redshifts ==
During the 1950s bright radio sources, now known as quasars, had been discovered that did not appear to have an optical counterpart. In 1960 one of these sources, 3C 48, was found to be associated with what appeared to be a small blue star. When the spectrum of the star was measured, it contained unidentifiable spectral lines that defied all attempts at explanation; John Gatenby Bolton's suggestion that these were highly redshifted sources was not widely accepted. In 1963 Maarten Schmidt found a visible companion to the quasar 3C 273. Using the Hale Telescope, Schmidt found a similar odd spectrum, but was able to demonstrate that it could be explained as the spectrum of hydrogen, shifted by a very large 15.8%. If this was due to the physical motion of the "star", it would represent a recessional speed of 47,000 km/s, far beyond that of any known star and defying an obvious explanation. Schmidt noted that redshift is also associated with the expansion of the universe, as codified in Hubble's law. If the measured redshift was due to expansion, then the object in question would have to be very far away, and therefore have an extraordinarily high luminosity, higher than that of any object seen to date. This extreme luminosity would also explain the large radio signal. Schmidt concluded that quasars are very distant, very luminous objects. Schmidt's explanation for the high redshift was not universally accepted at the time. Another explanation offered was that it was gravitational redshift that was being measured. Several other mechanisms were proposed as well, each with its own problems.

In 1966, Arp published the Atlas of Peculiar Galaxies, which contained photographs of 338 nearby galaxies that did not fall into any of the classic categories of galaxy shapes. His goal was to produce a selection that modellers could use in order to test theories of galactic formation. By testing against the collection, one could quickly see how well a particular theory stood up. One group of these, numbers 1 through 101, were otherwise conventional galaxies that appeared to have small companion objects of unknown origin. In 1967 Arp noted that several of these objects appeared on the list of quasars. In some photographs a quasar is in the foreground of a known galaxy, and in others there appeared to be matter bridging the two objects, implying they are very close in space. If they were, and the redshifts were due to Hubble expansion, then both objects should have similar redshifts. However, in many cases the galaxies had much smaller redshifts than the quasars. Arp also noted that quasars were not evenly spread over the sky, but tended to be more commonly found in positions of small angular separation from certain galaxies. This being the case, they might be in some way related to the galaxies. Arp argued that the redshift was not due to Hubble expansion or physical movement of the objects, but must have a non-cosmological or "intrinsic" origin, and that quasars were local objects ejected from active galactic nuclei (AGN). Nearby galaxies with both strong radio emission and peculiar morphologies, particularly M87 and Centaurus A, appeared to support Arp's hypothesis.

Since the 1960s, telescopes and astronomical instrumentation have advanced greatly: the Hubble Space Telescope was launched, and cosmological theory and observation has advanced considerably. Black holes and supermassive black holes have been directly as well as indirectly detected, extremely distant objects are routinely studied and contextualized, multiple 8-10 meter telescopes (such as those at Keck Observatory and the Very Large Telescope) have become operational, and detectors such as CCDs are now more widely employed. These developments have cemented the interpretation of quasars as very distant active galaxies with high redshifts. Many imaging surveys, most notably the Hubble Deep Field, have found many high-redshift objects that are not QSOs but that appear to be normal galaxies like those found nearby. The spectra of the high-redshift galaxies, as seen from X-ray to radio wavelengths, match the spectra of nearby galaxies (particularly galaxies with high levels of star formation activity but also galaxies with normal or extinguished star formation activity) when corrected for redshift effects.

Arp never wavered from his stand against the Big Bang, and until shortly before his death in 2013, he continued to publish articles stating his contrary view in both popular and scientific literature, frequently collaborating with Geoffrey Burbidge (until Burbidge's death in 2010) and Margaret Burbidge. He explained his reasons for believing that the Big Bang theory is wrong, citing his research into quasars, or quasi-stellar objects (QSOs). Instead, Arp supported the redshift quantization theory as an explanation of the redshifts of galaxies.

As more recent experiments have expanded the amount of collected data by orders of magnitude, Arp's theories can now be scrutinized further. For instance, a recent study by Tang and Zhang about the periodicity of redshifts (a hypothesis articulated by Arp) stated:

"... the publicly available data from the Sloan Digital Sky Survey and 2dF QSO redshift survey to test the hypothesis that QSOs are ejected from active galaxies with periodic noncosmological redshifts. For two different intrinsic redshift models, [...] and find there is no evidence for a periodicity at the predicted frequency in log(1+z), or at any other frequency."

However, a follow-up study by Bell and McDiarmid argued that Arp's hypothesis about the periodicity in redshifts could not be discarded so easily:

"The Tang and Zhang (2005) analysis could thus have missed, or misidentified, many of the parent galaxies, which could explain why the pairs they found differed little from what would be expected for a random distribution. In spite of this, although it was not pointed out by these authors, their pairs did show a slight excess near the expected value of 200 kpc….In fact, most of the conclusions reached by Tang and Zhang (2005) appear to have resulted because they have assumed that many of the values [that they have used] are much more accurate than they really are. …[we found by examining 46400 quasars from Sloan Digital Sky Survey that] the locations of the peaks in the redshift distribution are in agreement with the preferred redshifts predicted by the intrinsic redshift equation"

In a 2009 paper Bell and Comeau retracted the claim that these features were due to redshift periodicity, and acknowledged that they are caused by subtle selection biases. The SDSS team had previously described these effects, and shown that the apparent peaks in the redshift distribution disappear in a highly complete subsample of quasars.

== Honors and awards ==
In 1960, Arp was awarded the Helen B. Warner Prize for Astronomy by the American Astronomical Society, a prize "normally awarded annually for a significant contribution to observational or theoretical astronomy during the five years preceding the award."

In the same year, Arp was awarded the Newcomb Cleveland Prize for his address, "The Stellar Content of Galaxies", read before a joint session of the American Astronomical Society and AAAS Section D.

In 1984, he was awarded the Alexander von Humboldt Senior Scientist Award.

== Books ==
- Atlas of Peculiar Galaxies (1966)
- The Redshift Controversy (1973, with George B. Field and John N. Bahcall)
- Quasars, Redshifts and Controversies (1987)
- Seeing Red: Redshifts, Cosmology and Academic Science (1998)
- Catalogue of Discordant Redshift Associations (2003)
- A Catalogue of Southern Peculiar Galaxies and Associations with Barry F. Madore (1987)

== See also ==
- Cosmology
  - Non-standard cosmology
  - Intrinsic redshifts
  - Redshift quantization
  - Le Sage's theory of gravitation
