= List of NGC objects (1001–2000) =

This is a list of NGC objects 1001–2000 from the New General Catalogue (NGC). The astronomical catalogue is composed mainly of star clusters, nebulae, and galaxies. Other objects in the catalogue can be found in the other subpages of the list of NGC objects.

The constellation information in these tables is taken from The Complete New General Catalogue and Index Catalogue of Nebulae and Star Clusters by J. L. E. Dreyer, which was accessed using the "VizieR Service". Galaxy morphological types and objects that are members of the Large Magellanic Cloud are identified using the NASA/IPAC Extragalactic Database. The other data of these tables are from Wolfgang Steinicke's Revised New General Catalogue and Index Catalogue and/or the SIMBAD Astronomical Database unless otherwise stated.

== 1001–1100 ==
| NGC number | Other names | Object type | Constellation | Right ascension (J2000) | Declination (J2000) | Apparent magnitude |
|---|---|---|---|---|---|---|
| 1001 | | Barred spiral galaxy | Andromeda | 02^{h} 39^{m} 12.6^{s} | +41° 40′ 18″ | 14.7 |
| 1002 | | Barred spiral galaxy | Perseus | 02^{h} 38^{m} 55.6^{s} | +34° 37′ 20″ | 13.94 |
| 1003 | | Spiral galaxy | Perseus | 02^{h} 39^{m} 16.9^{s} | +40° 52′ 20″ | 12 |
| 1004 | | Elliptical galaxy | Cetus | 02^{h} 37^{m} 41.8^{s} | +1° 58′ 31″ | 13.71 |
| 1005 | | Galaxy | Andromeda | 02^{h} 39^{m} 29.2^{s} | +41° 29′ 20″ | 14.7 |
| 1006 | | Barred spiral galaxy | Cetus | 02^{h} 37^{m} 34.8^{s} | −11° 01′ 30″ | 14.50 |
| 1007 | | Galaxy | Cetus | 02^{h} 37^{m} 52.2^{s} | +02° 09′ 22″ | 15.70 |
| 1008 | | Elliptical galaxy | Cetus | 02^{h} 37^{m} 55.3^{s} | +02° 04′ 47″ | 14.63 |
| 1009 | | Spiral galaxy | Cetus | 02^{h} 38^{m} 19.1^{s} | +02° 18′ 36″ | 15.21 |
| 1010 | Duplicate of NGC 1006 | Barred spiral galaxy | Cetus | 02^{h} 37^{m} 34.8^{s} | −11° 01′ 30″ | 14.50 |
| 1011 | | Elliptical galaxy | Cetus | 02^{h} 37^{m} 38.9^{s} | −11° 00′ 20″ | 13.3R |
| 1012 | | Spiral galaxy | Aries | 02^{h} 39^{m} 14.9^{s} | +30° 09′ 06″ | 13.00 |
| 1013 | | Galaxy | Cetus | 02^{h} 37^{m} 50.5^{s} | −11° 30′ 26″ | 14.97 |
| 1014 | | Double star | Cetus | 02^{h} 38^{m} 00.8^{s} | −9° 34′ 24″ | ? |
| 1015 | | Barred spiral galaxy | Cetus | 02^{h} 38^{m} 11.5^{s} | −1° 19′ 08″ | 12.98 |
| 1016 | | Elliptical galaxy | Cetus | 02^{h} 38^{m} 19.6^{s} | +02° 07′ 10″ | 12.61 |
| 1017 | | Spiral galaxy | Cetus | 02^{h} 37^{m} 49.9^{s} | −11° 00′ 40″ | 14.5 |
| 1018 | | Barred spiral galaxy | Cetus | 02^{h} 38^{m} 10.3^{s} | −09° 32′ 38″ | 15.38 |
| 1019 | | Barred spiral galaxy | Cetus | 02^{h} 38^{m} 27.5^{s} | +01° 54′ 28″ | 14.34 |
| 1020 | | Elliptical galaxy | Cetus | 02^{h} 38^{m} 44.3^{s} | +02° 13′ 53″ | 15.14 |
| 1021 | | Barred spiral galaxy | Cetus | 02^{h} 38^{m} 48.0^{s} | +02° 13′ 03″ | 15.02 |
| 1022 | | Barred spiral galaxy | Cetus | 02^{h} 38^{m} 32.7^{s} | −06° 40′ 39″ | 12.09 |
| 1023 | | Barred lenticular galaxy | Perseus | 02^{h} 40^{m} 24.0^{s} | +39° 03′ 48″ | 10.35 |
| 1024 | | Spiral galaxy | Aries | 02^{h} 39^{m} 11.9^{s} | +10° 50′ 49″ | 13.08 |
| 1025 | | Spiral galaxy | Horologium | 02^{h} 36^{m} 19.9^{s} | −54° 51′ 51″ | 13.84 |
| 1026 | | Spiral galaxy | Cetus | 02^{h} 39^{m} 19^{s} | 6° 32′ 40″ | 12.7 |
| 1027 | | Open cluster | Cassiopeia | 02^{h} 42^{m} 35^{s} | 61° 35′ 40″ | 6.7 |
| 1028 | | Barred spiral galaxy | Aries | 02^{h} 39^{m} 37.2^{s} | +10° 50′ 37″ | 14.79 |
| 1029 | | Barred lenticular galaxy | Aries | 02^{h} 39^{m} 36.5^{s} | +10° 47′ 36″ | 13.11 |
| 1030 | | Spiral galaxy | Aries | 02^{h} 39^{m} 50.6^{s} | +18° 01′ 27″ | 11.42 |
| 1031 | | Spiral galaxy | Horologium | 02^{h} 36^{m} 38.8^{s} | −54° 51′ 35″ | 11.60 |
| 1032 | | Spiral galaxy | Cetus | 02^{h} 39^{m} 23.6^{s} | +01° 05′ 38″ | 12.64 |
| 1033 | | Spiral galaxy | Cetus | 02^{h} 40^{m} 16.1^{s} | −08° 46′ 37″ | 14.4 |
| 1034 | | Galaxy | Cetus | 02^{h} 38^{m} 14.0^{s} | −15° 48′ 33″ | 14.56 |
| 1035 | | Spiral galaxy | Cetus | 02^{h} 39^{m} 29.1^{s} | −08° 08′ 01″ | 12.89 |
| 1036 | | Irregular galaxy | Aries | 02^{h} 40^{m} 29.0^{s} | +19° 17′ 49″ | 13.75 |
| 1037 | Doesn't exist at the listed coordinates (Note: May actually be UGC 2119 (02^{h} 37^{m} 58.7^{s}, −01° 50′ 39″) or IC 243 (02^{h} 38^{m} 32.2^{s}, −06° 54′ 07″)) | Spiral galaxy | Cetus | 02^{h} 39^{m} 58.4^{s} | +01° 44′ 03″ | ? |
| 1038 | | Lenticular galaxy | Cetus | 02^{h} 40^{m} 06.3^{s} | +01° 30′ 32″ | 14.4 |
| 1039 | Messier 34 | Open cluster | Perseus | 02^{h} 42^{m} | +42° 46′ | 5.4 |
| 1040 | | Lenticular galaxy | Andromeda | 02^{h} 43^{m} 12.4^{s} | +41° 30′ 02″ | 13.86 |
| 1041 | | Lenticular galaxy | Cetus | 02^{h} 40^{m} 25.2^{s} | −05° 26′ 26″ | 14.26 |
| 1042 | | Spiral galaxy | Cetus | 02^{h} 40^{m} 23.6^{s} | −08° 25′ 59″ | 11.1 |
| 1043 | | Spiral galaxy | Cetus | 02^{h} 40^{m} 46.6^{s} | +01° 20′ 35″ | 15.7 |
| 1044 | | Lenticular galaxy | Pisces | 02^{h} 41^{m} 03.7^{s} | +08° 46′ 07″ | 14.8 |
| 1045 | | Lenticular galaxy | Cetus | 02^{h} 40^{m} 29.1^{s} | −11° 16′ 39″ | 13.52 |
| 1046 | | Lenticular galaxy | Pisces | 02^{h} 41^{m} 12.8^{s} | +08° 43′ 10″ | 14.8 |
| 1047 | | Lenticular galaxy | Cetus | 02^{h} 40^{m} 32.8^{s} | −08° 08′ 52″ | 14.3 |
| 1048 | | Spiral galaxy | Cetus | 02^{h} 40^{m} 37.9^{s} | −08° 32′ 00″ | 14.8 |
| 1049 | | Globular cluster | Fornax | 02^{h} 39^{m} 52.5^{s} | −34° 16′ 08″ | 13.6 |
| 1050 | | Barred spiral galaxy | Triangulum | 02^{h} 42^{m} 35.6^{s} | +34° 45′ 49″ | 12.81 |
| 1051 | | Barred spiral galaxy | Cetus | 02^{h} 41^{m} 02.5^{s} | −06° 56′ 09″ | 13.4 |
| 1052 | | Elliptical galaxy | Cetus | 02^{h} 41^{m} 04.8^{s} | −08° 15′ 21″ | 12.08 |
| 1053 | Duplicate of NGC 1040 | Lenticular galaxy | Perseus | 02^{h} 43^{m} 12.4^{s} | +41° 30′ 02″ | 13.86 |
| 1054 | | Spiral galaxy | Aries | 02^{h} 42^{m} 15.7^{s} | +18° 13′ 02″ | 14.57 |
| 1055 | | Spiral galaxy | Cetus | 02^{h} 41^{m} 45.3^{s} | +00° 26′ 32″ | 12.5 |
| 1056 | | Spiral galaxy | Aries | 02^{h} 42^{m} 48.3^{s} | +28° 34′ 27″ | 13.32 |
| 1057 | | Lenticular galaxy | Triangulum | 02^{h} 43^{m} 02.9^{s} | +32° 29′ 28″ | 15.22 |
| 1058 | | Spiral galaxy | Perseus | 02^{h} 43^{m} 30.0^{s} | +37° 20′ 29″ | 11.82 |
| 1059 | | Double star | Aries | 02^{h} 42^{m} 35.6^{s} | +17° 59′ 48″ | |
| 1060 | | Lenticular galaxy | Triangulum | 02^{h} 43^{m} 15.0^{s} | +32° 25′ 30″ | 13 |
| 1061 | | Irregular galaxy | Triangulum | 02^{h} 43^{m} 15.7^{s} | +32° 28′ 00″ | 15.02 |
| 1062 | | Star | Triangulum | 02^{h} 43^{m} 24.0^{s} | +32° 27′ 44″ | |
| 1063 | | Spiral galaxy | Cetus | 02^{h} 42^{m} 10.0^{s} | −05° 34′ 07″ | 14.44 |
| 1064 | | Barred spiral galaxy | Cetus | 02^{h} 42^{m} 23.5^{s} | −09° 21′ 44″ | 15.11 |
| 1065 | | Galaxy | Cetus | 02^{h} 42^{m} 06.3^{s} | −15° 05′ 30″ | 15.09 |
| 1066 | | Elliptical galaxy | Triangulum | 02^{h} 43^{m} 49.9^{s} | +32° 28′ 30″ | 14.25 |
| 1067 | | Spiral galaxy | Triangulum | 02^{h} 43^{m} 50.5^{s} | +32° 30′ 43″ | 14.55 |
| 1068 | Messier 77 | Spiral galaxy | Cetus | 02^{h} 42^{m} 40.8^{s} | −00° 00′ 48″ | 8.9 |
| 1069 | | Spiral galaxy | Cetus | 02^{h} 42^{m} 59.8^{s} | −08° 17′ 22″ | 14.1 |
| 1070 | | Spiral galaxy | Cetus | 02^{h} 43^{m} 22.3^{s} | +04° 58′ 06″ | 12.72 |
| 1071 | | Barred spiral galaxy | Cetus | 02^{h} 43^{m} 07.8^{s} | −08° 46′ 26″ | 15.41 |
| 1072 | IC 1837 | Barred spiral galaxy | Cetus | 02^{h} 43^{m} 31.3^{s} | +00° 18′ 25″ | 14.1 |
| 1073 | | Spiral galaxy | Cetus | 02^{h} 43^{m} 40.6^{s} | +01° 22′ 34″ | 12.5 |
| 1074 | | Spiral galaxy | Cetus | 02^{h} 43^{m} 36.1^{s} | −16° 17′ 49″ | 15.18 |
| 1075 | | Galaxy | Cetus | 02^{h} 43^{m} 33.5^{s} | −16° 12′ 04″ | 15 |
| 1076 | | Lenticular galaxy | Cetus | 02^{h} 43^{m} 29.2^{s} | −14° 45′ 16″ | 13.71 |
| 1077 | | Interacting galaxy | Perseus | 02^{h} 46^{m} 01.7^{s} | +40° 05′ 30″ | |
| 1078 | | Galaxy | Cetus | 02^{h} 44^{m} 08.0^{s} | −09° 27′ 09″ | 15.32 |
| 1079 | | Spiral galaxy | Fornax | 02^{h} 43^{m} 44.3^{s} | −29° 00′ 12″ | 12.74 |
| 1080 | | Barred spiral galaxy | Cetus | 02^{h} 45^{m} 09.9^{s} | −04° 42′ 39″ | 14.08 |
| 1081 | | Barred spiral galaxy | Eridanus | 02^{h} 45^{m} 05.5^{s} | −15° 35′ 16″ | 14.36 |
| 1082 | | Galaxy | Eridanus | 02^{h} 45^{m} 41.2^{s} | −08° 10′ 50″ | 14.3 |
| 1083 | | Spiral galaxy | Eridanus | 02^{h} 45^{m} 40.6^{s} | −15° 21′ 28″ | 15.19 |
| 1084 | | Spiral galaxy | Eridanus | 02^{h} 45^{m} 59.9^{s} | −07° 34′ 42″ | 11.6 |
| 1085 | | Spiral galaxy | Cetus | 02^{h} 46^{m} 25.3^{s} | +03° 36′ 26″ | 13.07 |
| 1086 | | Spiral galaxy | Perseus | 02^{h} 47^{m} 56.4^{s} | +41° 14′ 47″ | 13.5 |
| 1087 | | Spiral galaxy | Cetus | 02^{h} 46^{m} 25.3^{s} | −00° 29′ 56″ | 11.4 |
| 1088 | | Lenticular galaxy | Aries | 02^{h} 47^{m} 04.4^{s} | +16° 12′ 04″ | |
| 1089 | | Galaxy | Eridanus | 02^{h} 46^{m} 10.1^{s} | −15° 04′ 23″ | 14.77 |
| 1090 | | Spiral galaxy | Cetus | 02^{h} 46^{m} 33.7^{s} | −00° 14′ 49″ | 12.8 |
| 1091 | | Spiral galaxy | Eridanus | 02^{h} 45^{m} 22.4^{s} | −17° 31′ 59″ | 15.33 |
| 1092 | | Elliptical galaxy | Eridanus | 02^{h} 45^{m} 29.6^{s} | −17° 32′ 32″ | 15.64 |
| 1093 | | Spiral galaxy | Triangulum | 02^{h} 48^{m} 16.1^{s} | +34° 25′ 11″ | 13.99 |
| 1094 | | Spiral galaxy | Cetus | 02^{h} 47^{m} 27.8^{s} | −00° 17′ 06″ | 13,7 |
| 1095 | | Barred spiral galaxy | Cetus | 02^{h} 47^{m} 37.8^{s} | +04° 38′ 16″ | 13.99 |
| 1096 | | Barred spiral galaxy | Horologium | 02^{h} 43^{m} 49.3^{s} | −59° 54′ 48″ | 13.49 |
| 1097 | | Spiral galaxy | Fornax | 02^{h} 46^{m} 19.0^{s} | −30° 16′ 29″ | 10.2 |
| 1098 | | Lenticular galaxy | Eridanus | 02^{h} 44^{m} 53.7^{s} | −17° 39′ 33″ | 14.33 |
| 1099 | | Barred spiral galaxy | Eridanus | 02^{h} 45^{m} 18.0^{s} | −17° 42′ 30″ | 14.33 |
| 1100 | | Spiral galaxy | Eridanus | 02^{h} 45^{m} 36.1^{s} | −17° 41′ 20″ | 14.33 |

== 1101–1200 ==
| NGC number | Other names | Object type | Constellation | Right ascension (J2000) | Declination (J2000) | Apparent magnitude |
|---|---|---|---|---|---|---|
| 1101 | | Lenticular galaxy | Cetus | 02^{h} 48^{m} 14.8^{s} | +04° 34′ 41″ | 13.96 |
| 1102 | | Spiral galaxy | Eridanus | 02^{h} 47^{m} 12.9^{s} | −22° 12′ 32″ | 15.48 |
| 1103 | | Barred spiral galaxy | Eridanus | 02^{h} 48^{m} 06.0^{s} | −13° 57′ 36″ | 13.61 |
| 1104 | | Barred spiral galaxy | Cetus | 02^{h} 48^{m} 38.7^{s} | −00° 16′ 17″ | 14.2 |
| 1105 | | Galaxy | Eridanus | 02^{h} 43^{m} 42.0^{s} | −15° 42′ 20″ | 15.44 |
| 1106 | | Lenticular galaxy | Perseus | 02^{h} 50^{m} 40.5^{s} | +41° 40′ 17″ | 13.3 |
| 1107 | | Lenticular galaxy | Cetus | 02^{h} 49^{m} 19.6^{s} | +08° 05′ 34″ | 13.46 |
| 1108 | | Galaxy | Eridanus | 02^{h} 48^{m} 38.5^{s} | −07° 57′ 04″ | 14.4 |
| 1109 | | Galaxy | Aries | 02^{h} 47^{m} 43.6^{s} | +13° 15′ 19″ | 15.4 |
| 1110 | | Barred spiral galaxy | Eridanus | 02^{h} 49^{m} 09.6^{s} | −07° 50′ 15″ | 14.5 |
| 1111 | | Lenticular galaxy | Aries | 02^{h} 49^{m} 50.7^{s} | +13° 08′ 43″ | |
| 1112 | | Spiral galaxy | Aries | 02^{h} 49^{m} 00.4^{s} | +13° 13′ 26″ | 14.53 |
| 1113 | | Star | Aries | 02^{h} 50^{m} 05.0^{s} | +13° 19′ 39″ | |
| 1114 | | Spiral galaxy | Eridanus | 02^{h} 49^{m} 07.2^{s} | −16° 59′ 36″ | 13.27 |
| 1115 | | Galaxy | Aries | 02^{h} 50^{m} 25.4^{s} | +13° 15′ 58″ | 15.6 |
| 1116 | | Spiral galaxy | Aries | 02^{h} 50^{m} 35.7^{s} | +13° 20′ 06″ | 15.2 |
| 1117 | | Elliptical galaxy | Aries | 02^{h} 51^{m} 13.1^{s} | +13° 11′ 07″ | 15.5 |
| 1118 | | Barred spiral galaxy | Eridanus | 02^{h} 49^{m} 58.7^{s} | −12° 09′ 49″ | 14.25 |
| 1119 | | Lenticular galaxy | Eridanus | 02^{h} 48^{m} 17.1^{s} | −17° 59′ 15″ | 14.78 |
| 1120 | IC 261 | Lenticular galaxy | Eridanus | 02^{h} 49^{m} 04.1^{s} | −14° 28′ 14″ | 14.83 |
| 1121 | | Lenticular galaxy | Eridanus | 02^{h} 50^{m} 39.2^{s} | −01° 44′ 03″ | 13.92 |
| 1122 | | Spiral galaxy | Perseus | 02^{h} 52^{m} 51.2^{s} | +42° 12′ 18″ | 12.9 |
| 1123 | Duplicate of NGC 1122 | Spiral galaxy | Perseus | 02^{h} 52^{m} 51.2^{s} | +42° 12′ 18″ | 12.9 |
| 1124 | | Barred spiral galaxy | Fornax | 02^{h} 51^{m} 35.9^{s} | −25° 42′ 07″ | 15.03 |
| 1125 | | Barred spiral galaxy | Eridanus | 02^{h} 51^{m} 40.4544^{s} | −16° 39′ 02.304″ | 13.43 |
| 1126 | | Spiral galaxy | Eridanus | 02^{h} 52^{m} 18.6^{s} | −01° 17′ 46″ | 15.43 |
| 1127 | | Barred spiral galaxy | Aries | 02^{h} 52^{m} 51.8^{s} | +13° 15′ 23″ | 15.27 |
| 1128 | | Elliptical galaxy | Cetus | 02^{h} 57^{m} 42.6^{s} | +06° 01′ 05″ | 15.5 |
| 1129 | | Elliptical galaxy | Perseus | 02^{h} 54^{m} 27.4^{s} | +41° 34′ 47″ | 13.5 |
| 1130 | | Galaxy | Perseus | 02^{h} 54^{m} 24.4^{s} | +41° 36′ 20″ | 15.6 |
| 1131 | | Galaxy | Perseus | 02^{h} 54^{m} 34.0^{s} | +41° 33′ 33″ | 15.6 |
| 1132 | | Elliptical galaxy | Eridanus | 02^{h} 52^{m} 51.8^{s} | −01° 16′ 29″ | 13.25 |
| 1133 | | Galaxy | Eridanus | 02^{h} 52^{m} 42.2^{s} | −08° 48′ 16″ | 14.5 |
| 1134 | | Spiral galaxy | Aries | 02^{h} 53^{m} 41.3^{s} | +13° 00′ 51″ | 13.05 |
| 1135 | | Spiral galaxy | Horologium | 02^{h} 50^{m} 47.2^{s} | −54° 55′ 46″ | 16.16 |
| 1136 | | Barred spiral galaxy | Horologium | 02^{h} 50^{m} 53.7^{s} | −54° 58′ 33″ | 13.75 |
| 1137 | | Spiral galaxy | Cetus | 02^{h} 54^{m} 02.7^{s} | +02° 57′ 43″ | 13.21 |
| 1138 | | Lenticular galaxy | Perseus | 02^{h} 56^{m} 36.4^{s} | +43° 02′ 50″ | 13.8 |
| 1139 | | Barred spiral galaxy | Eridanus | 02^{h} 52^{m} 46.8^{s} | −14° 31′ 46″ | 15.4 |
| 1140 | | Irregular galaxy | Eridanus | 02^{h} 54^{m} 33.6^{s} | −10° 01′ 40″ | 13.62 |
| 1141 | | Lenticular galaxy | Cetus | 02^{h} 55^{m} 09.7^{s} | −00° 10′ 40″ | 13.2 |
| 1142 | | Interacting galaxy | Cetus | 02^{h} 55^{m} 12.3^{s} | −00° 11′ 02″ | 13.2 |
| 1143 | Duplicate of NGC 1141 | Lenticular galaxy | Cetus | 02^{h} 55^{m} 09.7^{s} | −00° 10′ 40″ | 13.2 |
| 1144 | Duplicate of NGC 1142 | Interacting galaxy | Cetus | 02^{h} 55^{m} 12.3^{s} | −00° 11′ 02″ | 13.2 |
| 1145 | | Spiral galaxy | Eridanus | 02^{h} 54^{m} 33.5^{s} | −18° 38′ 06″ | 13.81 |
| 1146 | | Asterism | Perseus | 02^{h} 57^{m} 37.3^{s} | +46° 25′ 37″ | |
| 1147 | Doesn't exist | Unknown | Eridanus | 02^{h} 55^{m} 09.3^{s} | −09° 07′ 11″ | |
| 1148 | | Barred spiral galaxy | Eridanus | 02^{h} 57^{m} 04.4^{s} | −07° 41′ 08″ | 14.5 |
| 1149 | | Lenticular galaxy | Cetus | 02^{h} 57^{m} 23.9^{s} | −00° 18′ 34″ | 14.8 |
| 1150 | | Galaxy | Eridanus | 02^{h} 57^{m} 01.4^{s} | −15° 02′ 54″ | 14.93 |
| 1151 | | Galaxy | Eridanus | 02^{h} 57^{m} 04.6^{s} | −15° 00′ 47″ | 15.92 |
| 1152 | | Lenticular galaxy | Eridanus | 02^{h} 57^{m} 33.6^{s} | −07° 45′ 32″ | 14.1 |
| 1153 | | Lenticular galaxy | Cetus | 02^{h} 58^{m} 09.6^{s} | +03° 21′ 33″ | 13.35 |
| 1154 | | Barred spiral galaxy | Eridanus | 02^{h} 58^{m} 07.7^{s} | −10° 21′ 48″ | 13.89 |
| 1155 | | Elliptical galaxy | Eridanus | 02^{h} 58^{m} 13.1^{s} | −10° 21′ 02″ | 14.3 |
| 1156 | | Irregular galaxy | Aries | 02^{h} 59^{m} 42.3^{s} | +25° 14′ 15″ | 12.0 |
| 1157 | | Spiral galaxy | Eridanus | 02^{h} 58^{m} 06.7^{s} | −15° 07′ 07″ | 15.5 |
| 1158 | | Lenticular galaxy | Eridanus | 02^{h} 57^{m} 11.4^{s} | −14° 23′ 44″ | 15.2 |
| 1159 | | Spiral galaxy | Perseus | 03^{h} 00^{m} 46.5^{s} | +43° 09′ 45″ | 14.2 |
| 1160 | | Spiral galaxy | Perseus | 03^{h} 01^{m} 13.2^{s} | +44° 57′ 20″ | 13.5 |
| 1161 | | Lenticular galaxy | Perseus | 03^{h} 01^{m} 14.1^{s} | +44° 53′ 50″ | 12.5 |
| 1162 | | Elliptical galaxy | Eridanus | 02^{h} 58^{m} 56.0^{s} | −12° 23′ 55″ | 13.55 |
| 1163 | | Barred spiral galaxy | Eridanus | 03^{h} 00^{m} 22.1^{s} | −17° 09′ 09″ | 14.66 |
| 1164 | | Spiral galaxy | Perseus | 03^{h} 01^{m} 59.8^{s} | +42° 35′ 06″ | 14 |
| 1165 | | Barred spiral galaxy | Fornax | 02^{h} 58^{m} 47.7^{s} | −32° 05′ 57″ | 13.92 |
| 1166 | | Spiral galaxy | Aries | 03^{h} 00^{m} 35.0^{s} | +11° 50′ 34″ | 14.86 |
| 1167 | | Lenticular galaxy | Perseus | 03^{h} 01^{m} 42.4^{s} | +35° 12′ 21″ | 13.38 |
| 1168 | | Spiral galaxy | Aries | 03^{h} 00^{m} 47.0^{s} | +11° 46′ 20″ | 15.02 |
| 1169 | | Spiral galaxy | Perseus | 03^{h} 03^{m} 34.7^{s} | +46° 23′ 11″ | 12.2 |
| 1170 | Doesn't exist | Unknown | Aries | 03^{h} 02^{m} 26.9^{s} | +27° 04′ 22″ | |
| 1171 | | Spiral galaxy | Perseus | 03^{h} 03^{m} 59.0^{s} | +43° 23′ 54″ | 13 |
| 1172 | | Elliptical galaxy | Eridanus | 03^{h} 01^{m} 36.0^{s} | −14° 50′ 12″ | 13.31 |
| 1173 | Doesn't exist | Unknown | Perseus | 03^{h} 03^{m} 57.7^{s} | +42° 23′ 01″ | |
| 1174 | Duplicate of NGC 1186 | Barred spiral galaxy | Perseus | 03^{h} 05^{m} 30.8^{s} | +42° 50′ 08″ | 12.2 |
| 1175 | Peanut Galaxy | Lenticular galaxy | Perseus | 03^{h} 04^{m} 32.3^{s} | +42° 20′ 22″ | 13.89 |
| 1176 | | Star | Perseus | 03^{h} 04^{m} 34.9^{s} | +42° 23′ 36″ | |
| 1177 | | Spiral galaxy | Perseus | 03^{h} 04^{m} 37.1^{s} | +42° 21′ 46″ | 15.5 |
| 1178 | | Star | Perseus | 03^{h} 04^{m} 38.8^{s} | +42° 18′ 48″ | |
| 1179 | | Spiral galaxy | Eridanus | 03^{h} 02^{m} 38.5^{s} | −18° 53′ 52″ | 13.83 |
| 1180 | | Galaxy | Eridanus | 03^{h} 01^{m} 51.0^{s} | −15° 01′ 47″ | 15.76 |
| 1181 | | Lenticular galaxy | Eridanus | 03^{h} 01^{m} 42.7^{s} | −15° 03′ 08″ | 16.19 |
| 1182 | | Spiral galaxy | Eridanus | 03^{h} 03^{m} 28.4^{s} | −09° 40′ 13″ | 14.79 |
| 1183 | | Star | Perseus | 03^{h} 04^{m} 46.1^{s} | +42° 22′ 08″ | |
| 1184 | | Spiral galaxy | Cepheus | 03^{h} 16^{m} 45.0^{s} | +80° 47′ 36″ | 13.44 |
| 1185 | | Barred spiral galaxy | Eridanus | 03^{h} 02^{m} 59.5^{s} | −09° 07′ 56″ | 14.46 |
| 1186 | Duplicate of NGC 1174 | Barred spiral galaxy | Perseus | 03^{h} 05^{m} 30.8^{s} | +42° 50′ 08″ | 12.2 |
| 1187 | | Spiral galaxy | Eridanus | 03^{h} 02^{m} 37.4^{s} | −22° 52′ 02″ | 11.4 |
| 1188 | | Lenticular galaxy | Eridanus | 03^{h} 03^{m} 43.4^{s} | −15° 29′ 04″ | 14.77 |
| 1189 | | Barred spiral galaxy | Eridanus | 03^{h} 03^{m} 24.5^{s} | −15° 37′ 24″ | 15.15 |
| 1190 | | Lenticular galaxy | Eridanus | 03^{h} 03^{m} 26.4^{s} | −15° 39′ 45″ | 15.3 |
| 1191 | | Lenticular galaxy | Eridanus | 03^{h} 03^{m} 30.8^{s} | −15° 41′ 07″ | 15.28 |
| 1192 | | Elliptical galaxy | Eridanus | 03^{h} 03^{m} 34.6^{s} | −15° 40′ 44″ | 15.36 |
| 1193 | | Open cluster | Perseus | 03^{h} 05^{m} 55.7^{s} | +44° 22′ 59″ | 12.6 |
| 1194 | | Lenticular galaxy | Cetus | 03^{h} 03^{m} 49.1^{s} | −01° 06′ 13″ | 14 |
| 1195 | | Galaxy | Eridanus | 03^{h} 03^{m} 32.8^{s} | −12° 02′ 23″ | 14.5 |
| 1196 | | Lenticular galaxy | Eridanus | 03^{h} 03^{m} 35.2^{s} | −12° 04′ 35″ | 14.5 |
| 1197 | Doesn't exist | Unknown | Perseus | 03^{h} 06^{m} 14.2^{s} | +44° 03′ 40″ | |
| 1198 | IC 282 | Lenticular galaxy | Perseus | 03^{h} 06^{m} 13.2^{s} | +41° 50′ 56″ | 13.5 |
| 1199 | | Elliptical galaxy | Eridanus | 03^{h} 03^{m} 38.4^{s} | −15° 36′ 49″ | 12.37 |
| 1200 | | Lenticular galaxy | Eridanus | 03^{h} 03^{m} 54.5^{s} | −11° 59′ 31″ | 13.2 |

== 1201–1300 ==
| NGC number | Other names | Object type | Constellation | Right ascension (J2000) | Declination (J2000) | Apparent magnitude |
|---|---|---|---|---|---|---|
| 1201 | | Lenticular galaxy | Fornax | 03^{h} 04^{m} 08.0^{s} | −26° 04′ 11″ | 12.2 |
| 1202 | | Spiral galaxy | Eridanus | 03^{h} 05^{m} 02.5^{s} | −06° 29′ 30″ | 16.6 |
| 1203 | | Elliptical galaxy | Eridanus | 03^{h} 05^{m} 14.4^{s} | −14° 22′ 41″ | 12.5 |
| 1204 | | Spiral galaxy | Eridanus | 03^{h} 04^{m} 39.9^{s} | −12° 20′ 29″ | 14.21 |
| 1205 | Duplicate of NGC 1182 | Spiral galaxy | Eridanus | 03^{h} 03^{m} 28.4^{s} | −09° 40′ 13″ | 14.79 |
| 1206 | | Elliptical galaxy | Eridanus | 03^{h} 06^{m} 09.7^{s} | −08° 49′ 59″ | 14.68 |
| 1207 | | Spiral galaxy | Perseus | 03^{h} 08^{m} 15.5^{s} | +38° 22′ 56″ | 13.38 |
| 1208 | | Spiral galaxy | Eridanus | 03^{h} 06^{m} 11.9^{s} | −09° 32′ 29″ | 13.35 |
| 1209 | | Elliptical galaxy | Eridanus | 03^{h} 06^{m} 03.0^{s} | −15° 36′ 41″ | 12.86 |
| 1210 | | Lenticular galaxy | Fornax | 03^{h} 06^{m} 45.3^{s} | −25° 42′ 59″ | 13.46 |
| 1211 | | Barred spiral galaxy | Cetus | 03^{h} 06^{m} 52.4^{s} | −00° 47′ 40″ | 13.2 |
| 1212 | IC 1883 | Spiral galaxy | Perseus | 03^{h} 09^{m} 42.2^{s} | +40° 53′ 35″ | 16 |
| 1213 | IC 1881 | Spiral galaxy | Perseus | 03^{h} 09^{m} 17.3^{s} | +38° 38′ 58″ | 15 |
| 1214 | | Lenticular galaxy | Eridanus | 03^{h} 06^{m} 56.0^{s} | −09° 32′ 39″ | 14.3 |
| 1215 | | Spiral galaxy | Eridanus | 03^{h} 07^{m} 09.5^{s} | −09° 35′ 35″ | 14 |
| 1216 | | Lenticular galaxy | Eridanus | 03^{h} 07^{m} 18.5^{s} | −09° 36′ 46″ | 15.25 |
| 1217 | | Spiral galaxy | Fornax | 03^{h} 06^{m} 06.0^{s} | −39° 02′ 11″ | 13.64 |
| 1218 | | Spiral galaxy | Cetus | 03^{h} 08^{m} 26.2^{s} | +04° 06′ 39″ | 13.84 |
| 1219 | | Spiral galaxy | Cetus | 03^{h} 08^{m} 28.0^{s} | +02° 06′ 31″ | 13.82 |
| 1220 | | Open cluster | Perseus | 03^{h} 11^{m} 40.7^{s} | +53° 20′ 53″ | 11.8 |
| 1221 | | Lenticular galaxy | Eridanus | 03^{h} 08^{m} 15.5^{s} | −04° 15′ 34″ | 14.6 |
| 1222 | | Lenticular galaxy | Eridanus | 03^{h} 08^{m} 56.7^{s} | −02° 57′ 19″ | 13.62 |
| 1223 | | Elliptical galaxy | Eridanus | 03^{h} 08^{m} 19.9^{s} | −04° 08′ 18″ | 14.42 |
| 1224 | | Lenticular galaxy | Perseus | 03^{h} 11^{m} 13.5^{s} | +41° 21′ 49″ | 14.7 |
| 1225 | | Galaxy | Eridanus | 03^{h} 08^{m} 47.2^{s} | −04° 06′ 06″ | 14.85 |
| 1226 | | Elliptical galaxy | Perseus | 03^{h} 11^{m} 05.3^{s} | +35° 23′ 13″ | 13.85 |
| 1227 | | Lenticular galaxy | Perseus | 03^{h} 11^{m} 07.7^{s} | +35° 19′ 29″ | 15.24 |
| 1228 | | Lenticular galaxy | Eridanus | 03^{h} 08^{m} 11.7^{s} | −22° 55′ 22″ | 14.59 |
| 1229 | | Barred spiral galaxy | Eridanus | 03^{h} 08^{m} 10.8^{s} | −22° 57′ 39″ | 14.82 |
| 1230 | | Lenticular galaxy | Eridanus | 03^{h} 08^{m} 16.4^{s} | −22° 59′ 02″ | 15.37 |
| 1231 | | Spiral galaxy | Eridanus | 03^{h} 06^{m} 29.3^{s} | −15° 34′ 09″ | 14.42 |
| 1232 | | Spiral galaxy | Eridanus | 03^{h} 09^{m} 45.4^{s} | −20° 34′ 45″ | 10.7 |
| 1233 | | Spiral galaxy | Perseus | 03^{h} 12^{m} 33.1^{s} | +39° 19′ 08″ | 14 |
| 1234 | PGC 11813 | Barred spiral galaxy | Eridanus | 03^{h} 9^{m} 39.1^{s} | −07° 50′ 47″ | 15.3g |
| 1235 | Duplicate of NGC 1233 | Spiral galaxy | Perseus | 03^{h} 12^{m} 33.1^{s} | +39° 19′ 08″ | 14 |
| 1236 | | Galaxy | Aries | 03^{h} 11^{m} 28.0^{s} | +10° 48′ 30″ | 15.7 |
| 1237 | | Double star | Eridanus | 03^{h} 10^{m} 09.0^{s} | −08° 41′ 32″ | |
| 1238 | | Elliptical galaxy | Eridanus | 03^{h} 10^{m} 52.7^{s} | −10° 44′ 53″ | 14.3 |
| 1239 | | Lenticular galaxy | Eridanus | 03^{h} 10^{m} 53.7^{s} | −02° 33′ 11″ | 14.61 |
| 1240 | | Double star? | Aries | 03^{h} 13^{m} 26.7^{s} | +30° 30′ 26″ | |
| 1241 | Arp 304 | Barred spiral galaxy | Eridanus | 03^{h} 11^{m} 14.6^{s} | −08° 55′ 20″ | 11.99 |
| 1242 | Arp 305 | Barred spiral galaxy | Eridanus | 03^{h} 11^{m} 19.3^{s} | −08° 54′ 09″ | 14.55 |
| 1243 | | Double star | Eridanus | 03^{h} 11^{m} 25.4^{s} | −08° 56′ 43″ | |
| 1244 | | Spiral galaxy | Horologium | 03^{h} 06^{m} 31.1^{s} | −66° 46′ 32″ | 13.88 |
| 1245 | | Open cluster | Perseus | 03^{h} 15^{m} | +47° 15′ | 9.2 |
| 1246 | | Elliptical galaxy | Horologium | 03^{h} 07^{m} 02.1^{s} | −66° 56′ 19″ | 13.85 |
| 1247 | | Spiral galaxy | Eridanus | 03^{h} 12^{m} 14.3^{s} | −10° 28′ 52″ | 13.47 |
| 1248 | | Lenticular galaxy | Eridanus | 03^{h} 12^{m} 48.5^{s} | −05° 13′ 29″ | 13.72 |
| 1249 | | Barred spiral galaxy | Horologium | 03^{h} 10^{m} 01.2^{s} | −53° 20′ 09″ | 12.19 |
| 1250 | | Lenticular galaxy | Perseus | 03^{h} 15^{m} 21.1^{s} | +41° 21′ 20″ | 13.96 |
| 1251 | | Double star | Cetus | 03^{h} 14^{m} 09.1^{s} | +01° 27′ 24″ | |
| 1252 | | non-existent (Note: Thought to be an open cluster Gaia data shows stars in the area are unrelated) | Horologium | 03^{h} 10^{m} 44.3^{s} | −57° 45′ 31″ | 12.58 |
| 1253 | | Spiral galaxy | Eridanus | 03^{h} 14^{m} 09.1^{s} | −02° 49′ 22″ | 13 |
| 1254 | | Lenticular galaxy | Cetus | 03^{h} 14^{m} 24.0^{s} | +02° 40′ 38″ | 15.1 |
| 1255 | | Spiral galaxy | Fornax | 03^{h} 13^{m} 32.0^{s} | −25° 43′ 31″ | 12.06 |
| 1256 | | Spiral galaxy | Eridanus | 03^{h} 13^{m} 58.3^{s} | −21° 59′ 11″ | 14.37 |
| 1257 | | Double star | Perseus | 03^{h} 16^{m} 59.5^{s} | +41° 31′ 45″ | |
| 1258 | | Spiral galaxy | Eridanus | 03^{h} 14^{m} 05.5^{s} | −21° 46′ 27″ | 13.95 |
| 1259 | | Lenticular galaxy | Eridanus | 03^{h} 17^{m} 17.3^{s} | +41° 23′ 07″ | 16 |
| 1260 | | Lenticular galaxy | Perseus | 03^{h} 17^{m} 27.2^{s} | +41° 24′ 19″ | 14.32 |
| 1261 | | Globular cluster | Horologium | 03^{h} 12^{m} 15.4^{s} | −55° 13′ 01″ | 9.8 |
| 1262 | | Spiral galaxy | Eridanus | 03^{h} 15^{m} 33.6^{s} | −15° 52′ 46″ | 15 |
| 1263 | | Galaxy | Eridanus | 03^{h} 15^{m} 39.5^{s} | −15° 05′ 54″ | 15.04 |
| 1264 | | Barred spiral galaxy | Perseus | 03^{h} 17^{m} 59.6^{s} | +41° 31′ 13″ | 16 |
| 1265 | | Elliptical galaxy | Perseus | 03^{h} 18^{m} 15.8^{s} | +41° 51′ 28″ | 13.22 |
| 1266 | | Lenticular galaxy | Eridanus | 03^{h} 16^{m} 00.8^{s} | −02° 25′ 38″ | 14 |
| 1267 | | Elliptical galaxy | Perseus | 03^{h} 18^{m} 44.9^{s} | +41° 28′ 04″ | 15.4 |
| 1268 | | Spiral galaxy | Perseus | 03^{h} 18^{m} 45.1^{s} | +41° 29′ 19″ | 14.2 |
| 1269 | | Barred spiral galaxy | Eridanus | 03^{h} 17^{m} 18.6^{s} | −41° 06′ 29″ | 9.39 |
| 1270 | | Elliptical galaxy | Perseus | 03^{h} 18^{m} 58.1^{s} | +41° 28′ 12″ | 14.26 |
| 1271 | | Lenticular galaxy | Perseus | 03^{h} 19^{m} 11.3^{s} | +41° 21′ 12″ | 15.1 |
| 1272 | | Elliptical galaxy | Perseus | 03^{h} 19^{m} 21.3^{s} | +41° 29′ 26″ | 12.86 |
| 1273 | | Lenticular galaxy | Perseus | 03^{h} 19^{m} 26.7^{s} | +41° 32′ 26″ | 14.27 |
| 1274 | | Elliptical galaxy | Perseus | 03^{h} 19^{m} 40.5^{s} | +41° 32′ 55″ | 15.12 |
| 1275 | Perseus A | Elliptical galaxy | Perseus | 03^{h} 19^{m} 48.1^{s} | +41° 30′ 42″ | 12.64 |
| 1276 | | Double star | Perseus | 03^{h} 19^{m} 51.2^{s} | +41° 38′ 31″ | |
| 1277 | | Lenticular galaxy | Perseus | 3^{h} 19^{m} 51.5^{s} | +41° 34′ 25″ | 14.66 |
| 1278 | IC 1907 | Elliptical galaxy | Perseus | 03^{h} 19^{m} 54.1^{s} | +41° 33′ 48″ | 13.57 |
| 1279 | | Lenticular galaxy | Perseus | 03^{h} 19^{m} 59.1^{s} | +41° 28′ 46″ | 15.5 |
| 1280 | | Spiral galaxy | Cetus | 03^{h} 17^{m} 57.1^{s} | −00° 10′ 09″ | 14 |
| 1281 | | Elliptical galaxy | Perseus | 03^{h} 20^{m} 06.1^{s} | +41° 37′ 48″ | 14.5 |
| 1282 | | Elliptical galaxy | Perseus | 03^{h} 20^{m} 12.1^{s} | +41° 22′ 01″ | 13.87 |
| 1283 | | Elliptical galaxy | Perseus | 03^{h} 20^{m} 15.5^{s} | +41° 23′ 55″ | 14.73 |
| 1284 | | Lenticular galaxy | Eridanus | 03^{h} 17^{m} 45.5^{s} | −10° 17′ 21″ | 14.64 |
| 1285 | | Barred spiral galaxy | Eridanus | 03^{h} 17^{m} 53.4^{s} | −07° 17′ 52″ | 13.5g |
| 1286 | | Galaxy | Eridanus | 03^{h} 17^{m} 48.5^{s} | −07° 37′ 01″ | 14.1g |
| 1287 | | Spiral galaxy | Eridanus | 03^{h} 18^{m} 33.5^{s} | −02° 43′ 01″ | 14.72 |
| 1288 | | Spiral galaxy | Fornax | 03^{h} 17^{m} 13.2^{s} | −32° 34′ 33″ | 13.26 |
| 1289 | IC 314 | Lenticular galaxy | Eridanus | 03^{h} 18^{m} 49.8^{s} | −01° 58′ 24″ | 13.48 |
| 1290 | | Galaxy | Eridanus | 03^{h} 19^{m} 25.1^{s} | −13° 59′ 23″ | 15.4 |
| 1291 | Duplicate of NGC 1269 | Barred spiral galaxy | Eridanus | 03^{h} 17^{m} 18.6^{s} | −41° 06′ 29″ | 9.39 |
| 1292 | | Spiral galaxy | Fornax | 03^{h} 18^{m} 14.9^{s} | −27° 36′ 37″ | 12.7 |
| 1293 | | Elliptical galaxy | Perseus | 03^{h} 21^{m} 36.4^{s} | +41° 23′ 34″ | 14.5 |
| 1294 | | Lenticular galaxy | Perseus | 03^{h} 21^{m} 39.9^{s} | +41° 21′ 38″ | 14.3 |
| 1295 | | Galaxy | Eridanus | 03^{h} 20^{m} 03.2^{s} | −13° 59′ 54″ | 13.3 |
| 1296 | | Barred spiral galaxy | Eridanus | 03^{h} 18^{m} 49.7^{s} | −13° 03′ 45″ | 14.76 |
| 1297 | | Lenticular galaxy | Eridanus | 03^{h} 19^{m} 14.2^{s} | −19° 06′ 00″ | 12.77 |
| 1298 | | Elliptical galaxy | Eridanus | 03^{h} 20^{m} 13.1^{s} | −02° 06′ 51″ | 14.95 |
| 1299 | | Barred spiral galaxy | Eridanus | 03^{h} 20^{m} 09.7^{s} | −06° 15′ 43″ | 13.37 |
| 1300 | | Barred spiral galaxy | Eridanus | 03^{h} 19^{m} 40.8^{s} | −19° 24′ 40″ | 11.2 |

== 1301–1400 ==
| NGC number | Other names | Object type | Constellation | Right ascension (J2000) | Declination (J2000) | Apparent magnitude |
|---|---|---|---|---|---|---|
| 1301 | | Barred spiral galaxy | Eridanus | 03^{h} 20^{m} 35.3^{s} | −18° 42′ 55″ | 13.87 |
| 1302 | | Barred spiral galaxy | Fornax | 03^{h} 19^{m} 51.2^{s} | −26° 03′ 38″ | 11.69 |
| 1303 | | Galaxy | Eridanus | 03^{h} 20^{m} 40.8^{s} | −07° 23′ 40″ | 14.2g |
| 1304 | | Lenticular galaxy | Eridanus | 03^{h} 21^{m} 12.8^{s} | −04° 35′ 03″ | 14.4 |
| 1305 | | Lenticular galaxy | Eridanus | 03^{h} 21^{m} 23.0^{s} | −02° 19′ 01″ | 14.32 |
| 1306 | | Spiral galaxy | Fornax | 03^{h} 21^{m} 03.0^{s} | −25° 30′ 45″ | 13.6 |
| 1307 | Duplicate of NGC 1304 | Lenticular galaxy | Eridanus | 03^{h} 21^{m} 12.8^{s} | −04° 35′ 03″ | 14.4 |
| 1308 | | Barred spiral galaxy | Eridanus | 03^{h} 22^{m} 28.5^{s} | −02° 45′ 26″ | 14.7 |
| 1309 | | Spiral galaxy | Eridanus | 03^{h} 22^{m} 06.5^{s} | −15° 24′ 02″ | 12.1 |
| 1310 | | Spiral galaxy | Fornax | 03^{h} 21^{m} 03.5^{s} | −37° 06′ 07″ | 12.5 |
| 1311 | | Barred spiral galaxy | Horologium | 03^{h} 20^{m} 06.9^{s} | −52° 11′ 08″ | 13.44 |
| 1312 | | Double star | Taurus | 03^{h} 23^{m} 41.7^{s} | +01° 11′ 05″ | |
| 1313 | | Spiral galaxy | Reticulum | 03^{h} 18^{m} 15.4^{s} | −66° 29′ 50″ | 9.4 |
| 1314 | | Spiral galaxy | Eridanus | 03^{h} 22^{m} 41.1^{s} | −04° 11′ 12″ | 14.86 |
| 1315 | | Lenticular galaxy | Eridanus | 03^{h} 23^{m} 06.6^{s} | −21° 22′ 31″ | 13.88 |
| 1316 | Fornax A | Lenticular galaxy | Fornax | 03^{h} 22^{m} 41.5^{s} | −37° 12′ 34″ | 9.7 |
| 1317 | Fornax B | Spiral galaxy | Fornax | 03^{h} 22^{m} 44.8^{s} | −37° 06′ 01″ | 11.9 |
| 1318 | Duplicate of NGC 1317 | Spiral galaxy | Fornax | 03^{h} 22^{m} 44.8^{s} | −37° 06′ 01″ | 11.9 |
| 1319 | | Lenticular galaxy | Eridanus | 03^{h} 23^{m} 56.4^{s} | −21° 31′ 40″ | 14.06 |
| 1320 | | Spiral galaxy | Eridanus | 03^{h} 24^{m} 48.7^{s} | −03° 02′ 32″ | 13.32 |
| 1321 | | Elliptical galaxy | Eridanus | 03^{h} 24^{m} 48.6^{s} | −03° 00′ 56″ | 14.21 |
| 1322 | | Galaxy | Eridanus | 03^{h} 24^{m} 54.7^{s} | −02° 55′ 09″ | 14.36 |
| 1323 | | Galaxy | Eridanus | 03^{h} 24^{m} 56.1^{s} | −02° 49′ 20″ | 16.02 |
| 1324 | | Spiral galaxy | Eridanus | 03^{h} 25^{m} 01.7^{s} | −05° 44′ 45″ | 13.2g |
| 1325 | | Spiral galaxy | Eridanus | 03^{h} 24^{m} 25.6^{s} | −21° 32′ 39″ | 12.49 |
| 1326 | | Lenticular galaxy | Fornax | 03^{h} 23^{m} 56.4^{s} | −36° 27′ 53″ | 12.2 |
| 1327 | | Barred spiral galaxy | Fornax | 03^{h} 25^{m} 23.1^{s} | −25° 40′ 49″ | 15.24 |
| 1328 | | Galaxy | Eridanus | 03^{h} 25^{m} 39.1^{s} | −04° 07′ 30″ | 14.78 |
| 1329 | | Spiral galaxy | Eridanus | 03^{h} 26^{m} 02.6^{s} | −17° 35′ 29″ | 13.79 |
| 1330 | | Asterism | Perseus | 03^{h} 29^{m} 04.5^{s} | +41° 40′ 31″ | |
| 1331 | IC 324 | Elliptical galaxy | Eridanus | 03^{h} 26^{m} 28.3^{s} | −21° 21′ 20″ | 14.33 |
| 1332 | | Lenticular galaxy | Eridanus | 03^{h} 26^{m} 17.3^{s} | −21° 20′ 07″ | 12.11 |
| 1333 | | Diffuse nebula | Perseus | 03^{h} 29^{m} 02^{s} | +31° 21′ | 10.9 |
| 1334 | | Spiral galaxy | Perseus | 03^{h} 30^{m} 01.8^{s} | +41° 49′ 55″ | 14.1 |
| 1335 | | Lenticular galaxy | Perseus | 03^{h} 30^{m} 19.5^{s} | +41° 34′ 22″ | 14.8 |
| 1336 | | Lenticular galaxy | Fornax | 03^{h} 26^{m} 32.2^{s} | −35° 42′ 49″ | 13.1 |
| 1337 | | Spiral galaxy | Eridanus | 03^{h} 28^{m} 06.0^{s} | −08° 23′ 18″ | 12.5 |
| 1338 | | Spiral galaxy | Eridanus | 03^{h} 28^{m} 54.5^{s} | −12° 09′ 12″ | 13.7b |
| 1339 | | Elliptical galaxy | Fornax | 03^{h} 28^{m} 06.6^{s} | −32° 17′ 10″ | 12.51 |
| 1340 | | Elliptical galaxy | Fornax | 03^{h} 28^{m} 19.7^{s} | −31° 04′ 05″ | 11.27 |
| 1341 | | Spiral galaxy | Fornax | 03^{h} 27^{m} 58.4^{s} | −37° 09′ 00″ | 13.21 |
| 1342 | | Open cluster | Perseus | 03^{h} 31^{m} 40.1^{s} | +37° 22′ 46″ | 6.7 |
| 1343 | | Spiral galaxy | Cassiopeia | 03^{h} 37^{m} 49.7^{s} | +72° 34′ 17″ | 13.5 |
| 1344 | Duplicate of NGC 1340 | Elliptical galaxy | Fornax | 03^{h} 28^{m} 19.7^{s} | −31° 04′ 05″ | 11.27 |
| 1345 | | Barred spiral galaxy | Eridanus | 03^{h} 29^{m} 31.7^{s} | −17° 46′ 42″ | 14.33 |
| 1346 | | Spiral galaxy | Eridanus | 03^{h} 30^{m} 13.2^{s} | −05° 32′ 36″ | 13.8g |
| 1347 | Arp 39 | Interacting galaxy | Eridanus | 03^{h} 29^{m} 41.5^{s} | −22° 17′ 06″ | 13.72 |
| 1348 | | Open cluster | Perseus | 03^{h} 34^{m} 08.5^{s} | +51° 25′ 14″ | |
| 1349 | | Lenticular galaxy | Taurus | 03^{h} 31^{m} 27.5^{s} | +04° 22′ 51″ | 14.17 |
| 1350 | | Spiral galaxy | Fornax | 03^{h} 31^{m} 08.1^{s} | −33° 37′ 43″ | 11.5 |
| 1351 | | Lenticular galaxy | Fornax | 03^{h} 30^{m} 35.0^{s} | −34° 51′ 14″ | 13.02 |
| 1352 | | Lenticular galaxy | Eridanus | 03^{h} 31^{m} 33.0^{s} | −19° 16′ 42″ | 14.79 |
| 1353 | | Barred spiral galaxy | Eridanus | 03^{h} 32^{m} 03.0^{s} | −20° 49′ 09″ | 12.57 |
| 1354 | | Spiral galaxy | Eridanus | 03^{h} 32^{m} 29.4^{s} | −15° 13′ 16″ | 13.46 |
| 1355 | | Lenticular galaxy | Eridanus | 03^{h} 33^{m} 23.5^{s} | −04° 59′ 55″ | 14.56 |
| 1356 | | Spiral galaxy | Horologium | 03^{h} 30^{m} 40.8^{s} | −50° 18′ 35″ | 13.71 |
| 1357 | | Spiral galaxy | Eridanus | 03^{h} 33^{m} 17.0^{s} | −13° 39′ 48″ | 12.4 |
| 1358 | | Spiral galaxy | Eridanus | 03^{h} 33^{m} 39.7^{s} | −05° 05′ 22″ | 14 |
| 1359 | | Irregular galaxy | Eridanus | 03^{h} 33^{m} 47.7^{s} | −19° 29′ 31″ | 13.0 |
| 1360 | | Planetary nebula | Fornax | 03^{h} 33^{m} 14.6^{s} | −25° 52′ 18″ | 11.0 |
| 1361 | | Elliptical galaxy | Eridanus | 03^{h} 34^{m} 17.8^{s} | −06° 15′ 54″ | 13.8 |
| 1362 | | Lenticular galaxy | Eridanus | 03^{h} 33^{m} 53.1^{s} | −20° 16′ 58″ | 14.2 |
| 1363 | | Barred spiral galaxy | Eridanus | 03^{h} 34^{m} 49.5486^{s} | −09° 50′ 32.476″ | 13.9b |
| 1364 | | Galaxy | Eridanus | 03^{h} 34^{m} 58.8^{s} | −09° 50′ 19″ | 15.4 |
| 1365 | | Barred spiral galaxy | Fornax | 03^{h} 33^{m} 36.3^{s} | −36° 08′ 28″ | 10.3 |
| 1366 | | Lenticular galaxy | Fornax | 03^{h} 33^{m} 53.7^{s} | −31° 11′ 39″ | 13.03 |
| 1367 | | Spiral galaxy | Fornax | 03^{h} 35^{m} 01.3^{s} | −24° 55′ 59″ | 11.57 |
| 1368 | | Galaxy | Eridanus | 03^{h} 34^{m} 58.9^{s} | −15° 39′ 21″ | 15.22 |
| 1369 | | Barred spiral galaxy | Fornax | 03^{h} 36^{m} 45.2^{s} | −36° 15′ 22″ | 13.47 |
| 1370 | | Lenticular galaxy | Eridanus | 03^{h} 35^{m} 14.6^{s} | −20° 22′ 25″ | 13.7 |
| 1371 | Duplicate of NGC 1367 | Spiral galaxy | Fornax | 03^{h} 35^{m} 01.3^{s} | −24° 55′ 59″ | 11.57 |
| 1372 | | Elliptical galaxy | Eridanus | 03^{h} 36^{m} 59.7^{s} | −15° 52′ 53″ | 15.39 |
| 1373 | | Elliptical galaxy | Fornax | 03^{h} 34^{m} 59.2^{s} | −35° 10′ 16″ | 14.27 |
| 1374 | | Elliptical galaxy | Fornax | 03^{h} 35^{m} 16.6^{s} | −35° 13′ 35″ | 12 |
| 1375 | | Lenticular galaxy | Fornax | 03^{h} 35^{m} 16.8^{s} | −35° 15′ 56″ | 13.5 |
| 1376 | | Spiral galaxy | Eridanus | 03^{h} 37^{m} 05.9^{s} | −05° 02′ 34″ | 12.89 |
| 1377 | | Lenticular galaxy | Eridanus | 03^{h} 36^{m} 39.0^{s} | −20° 54′ 06″ | 13.8 |
| 1378 | | Double star | Fornax | 03^{h} 35^{m} 58.2^{s} | −35° 12′ 40″ | |
| 1379 | | Elliptical galaxy | Fornax | 03^{h} 36^{m} 03.9^{s} | −35° 26′ 28″ | 12.64 |
| 1380 | | Lenticular galaxy | Fornax | 03^{h} 36^{m} 27.6^{s} | −34° 58′ 34″ | 11.2 |
| 1381 | | Lenticular galaxy | Fornax | 03^{h} 36^{m} 31.8^{s} | −35° 17′ 48″ | 12.3 |
| 1382 | | Lenticular galaxy | Fornax | 03^{h} 37^{m} 08.9^{s} | −35° 11′ 42″ | 12.92 |
| 1383 | | Elliptical galaxy | Eridanus | 03^{h} 37^{m} 39.2^{s} | −18° 20′ 22″ | 13.45 |
| 1384 | | Spiral galaxy | Taurus | 03^{h} 39^{m} 13.6^{s} | +15° 49′ 10″ | 15.36 |
| 1385 | | Barred spiral galaxy | Fornax | 03^{h} 37^{m} 28.3^{s} | −24° 30′ 05″ | 11.76 |
| 1386 | | Lenticular galaxy | Eridanus | 03^{h} 36^{m} 46.2^{s} | −35° 59′ 57″ | 12.09 |
| 1387 | | Lenticular galaxy | Fornax | 03^{h} 36^{m} 57.0^{s} | −35° 30′ 24″ | 12.01 |
| 1388 | | Elliptical galaxy | Eridanus | 03^{h} 38^{m} 12.0^{s} | −15° 53′ 58″ | 14.88 |
| 1389 | | Lenticular galaxy | Eridanus | 03^{h} 37^{m} 11.7^{s} | −35° 44′ 46″ | 13.16 |
| 1390 | | Barred spiral galaxy | Eridanus | 03^{h} 37^{m} 52.2^{s} | −19° 00′ 30″ | 14.59 |
| 1391 | | Lenticular galaxy | Eridanus | 03^{h} 38^{m} 52.9^{s} | −18° 21′ 15″ | 14.34 |
| 1392 | ESO 358-40 (Note: Originally this NGC object did not actually exist, but in 1982 its designation was given to ESO 358-40 (03^{h} 37^{m} 46.996^{s}, −36° 08′ 50.75″)) | Galaxy | Eridanus | 03^{h} 37^{m} 31.6^{s} | −37° 07′ 13″ | |
| 1393 | | Lenticular galaxy | Eridanus | 03^{h} 38^{m} 38.6^{s} | −18° 25′ 41″ | 12.97 |
| 1394 | | Lenticular galaxy | Eridanus | 03^{h} 39^{m} 06.9^{s} | −18° 17′ 32″ | 13.82 |
| 1395 | | Elliptical galaxy | Eridanus | 03^{h} 38^{m} 29.8^{s} | −23° 01′ 40″ | 10.97 |
| 1396 | | Lenticular galaxy | Eridanus | 03^{h} 38^{m} 06.5^{s} | −35° 26′ 24″ | 14.82 |
| 1397 | | Barred spiral galaxy | Eridanus | 03^{h} 39^{m} 47.1^{s} | −04° 40′ 12″ | 14.7 |
| 1398 | | Barred spiral galaxy | Fornax | 03^{h} 38^{m} 52.1^{s} | −26° 20′ 16″ | 10.63 |
| 1399 | | Elliptical galaxy | Fornax | 03^{h} 38^{m} 29.3^{s} | −35° 27′ 01″ | 10.3 |
| 1400 | | Lenticular galaxy | Eridanus | 03^{h} 39^{m} 30.7^{s} | −18° 41′ 18″ | 12.3 |

== 1401–1500 ==
| NGC number | Other names | Object type | Constellation | Right ascension (J2000) | Declination (J2000) | Apparent magnitude |
|---|---|---|---|---|---|---|
| 1401 | | Barred lenticular galaxy | Eridanus | 03^{h} 39^{m} 21.8^{s} | −22° 43′ 28″ | 12.1 |
| 1402 | | Barred lenticular galaxy | Eridanus | 03^{h} 39^{m} 30.4^{s} | −18° 31′ 37″ | 13.3 |
| 1403 | | Lenticular galaxy | Eridanus | 03^{h} 39^{m} 10.8^{s} | −22° 23′ 20″ | 12.7 |
| 1404 | | Elliptical galaxy | Fornax | 03^{h} 38^{m} 52.2^{s} | −35° 35′ 42″ | 10.9 |
| 1405 | | Lenticular galaxy | Eridanus | 03^{h} 40^{m} 19^{s} | −15° 31′ 51″ | 14.1 |
| 1406 | | Barred spiral galaxy | Reticulum | 03^{h} 39^{m} 23^{s} | −31° 19′ 20″ | 11.7 |
| 1407 | | Elliptical galaxy | Eridanus | 03^{h} 40^{m} 11.8^{s} | −18° 34′ 49″ | 9.7 |
| 1408 | Doesn't exist | Unknown | Reticulum | 03^{h} 39^{m} 20^{s} | −35° 31′ 30″ | ? |
| 1409 | | Interacting galaxy | Taurus | 03^{h} 41^{m} 10.4^{s} | −01° 18′ 09″ | 14.7 |
| 1410 | | Interacting galaxy | Taurus | 03^{h} 41^{m} 10.8^{s} | −01° 17′ 56″ | 14 |
| 1411 | | Lenticular galaxy | Horologium | 03^{h} 38^{m} 44.9^{s} | −44° 06′ 02″ | 11.3 |
| 1412 | | Lenticular galaxy | Reticulum | 03^{h} 40^{m} 29.3^{s} | −26° 51′ 43″ | 12.5 |
| 1413 | | Galaxy | Eridanus | 03^{h} 40^{m} 11.5^{s} | −15° 36′ 37″ | 14.3 |
| 1414 | | Barred spiral galaxy | Eridanus | 03^{h} 40^{m} 57^{s} | −21° 42′ 48″ | 13.8 |
| 1415 | | Lenticular galaxy | Eridanus | 03^{h} 40^{m} 56.9^{s} | −22° 33′ 51″ | 11.9 |
| 1416 | | Elliptical galaxy | Eridanus | 03^{h} 41^{m} 02.8^{s} | −22° 43′ 09″ | 13.1 |
| 1417 | | Spiral galaxy | Eridanus | 03^{h} 41^{m} 57.2^{s} | −04° 42′ 19″ | 12.1 |
| 1418 | | Barred spiral galaxy | Eridanus | 03^{h} 42^{m} 16.2^{s} | −04° 43′ 54″ | 13.6 |
| 1419 | | Elliptical galaxy | Eridanus | 03^{h} 40^{m} 42^{s} | −37° 30′ 40″ | 12.5 |
| 1420 | | Multiple star | Eridanus | 03^{h} 42^{m} 40^{s} | −05° 51′ 08″ | ? |
| 1421 | | Spiral galaxy | Eridanus | 03^{h} 42^{m} 29.4^{s} | −13° 29′ 16″ | 11.4 |
| 1422 | | Barred spiral galaxy | Eridanus | 03^{h} 41^{m} 31.3^{s} | −21° 40′ 51″ | 13.2 |
| 1423 | | Spiral galaxy | Eridanus | 03^{h} 42^{m} 40.1^{s} | −06° 22′ 54″ | 14.1 |
| 1424 | | Spiral galaxy | Eridanus | 03^{h} 43^{m} 14^{s} | −04° 43′ 49″ | 13.8 |
| 1425 | | Spiral galaxy | Reticulum | 03^{h} 42^{m} 11.5^{s} | −29° 53′ 39″ | 10.6 |
| 1426 | | Elliptical galaxy | Eridanus | 03^{h} 42^{m} 49.3^{s} | −22° 06′ 28″ | 11.3 |
| 1427 | | Elliptical galaxy | Fornax | 03^{h} 42^{m} 19.3^{s} | −35° 23′ 41″ | 11.8 |
| 1427A | | Irregular galaxy | Fornax | 03^{h} 40^{m} 09.4^{s} | −35° 37′ 46″ | 14.2 |
| 1428 | | Lenticular galaxy | Reticulum | 03^{h} 42^{m} 22.9^{s} | −35° 09′ 14″ | 12.8 |
| 1429 | Doesn't exist | Unknown | Eridanus | 03^{h} 44^{m} 04.1^{s} | −04° 43′ 05″ | ? |
| 1430 | | Star | Eridanus | 03^{h} 43^{m} 25.2^{s} | −18° 13′ 28″ | ? |
| 1431 | | Lenticular galaxy | Taurus | 03^{h} 44^{m} 40.7^{s} | +02° 50′ 08″ | 14.2 |
| 1432 | Maia Nebula (Located within Pleiades) | Diffuse nebula | Taurus | 03^{h} 46^{m} | +24° | |
| 1433 | | Barred spiral galaxy | Horologium | 03^{h} 42^{m} 1.2^{s} | −47° 13′ 19″ | 9.8 |
| 1434 | | Galaxy | Eridanus | 03^{h} 46^{m} 12.8^{s} | −09° 40′ 59″ | 14.3 |
| 1435 | Merope Nebula (Located within Pleiades) | Diffuse nebula | Taurus | 03^{h} 46^{m} | +24° | 13 |
| 1436 | | Spiral galaxy | Eridanus | 03^{h} 43^{m} 37.1^{s} | −35° 51′ 15″ | 11.7 |
| 1437 | Duplicate of NGC 1436 | Spiral galaxy | Eridanus | 03^{h} 43^{m} 37.1^{s} | −35° 51′ 15″ | 11.7 |
| 1438 | | Lenticular galaxy | Eridanus | 03^{h} 45^{m} 17.1^{s} | −23° 00′ 08″ | 12.3 |
| 1439 | | Elliptical galaxy | Eridanus | 03^{h} 44^{m} 49.8^{s} | −21° 55′ 13″ | 11.3 |
| 1440 | | Barred lenticular galaxy | Eridanus | 03^{h} 45^{m} 02.9^{s} | −18° 15′ 59″ | 11.6 |
| 1441 | | Barred spiral galaxy | Eridanus | 03^{h} 45^{m} 43^{s} | −04° 05′ 30″ | 13.1 |
| 1442 | Duplicate of NGC 1440 | Barred lenticular galaxy | Eridanus | 03^{h} 45^{m} 02.9^{s} | −18° 15′ 59″ | 11.6 |
| 1443 | | Star | Eridanus | 03^{h} 45^{m} 53.1^{s} | −04° 03′ 08″ | ? |
| 1444 | | Open cluster | Perseus | 03^{h} 49^{m} 25^{s} | +52° 39′ 30″ | 6.6 |
| 1445 | | Galaxy | Eridanus | 03^{h} 44^{m} 56.2^{s} | −09° 51′ 21″ | 14 |
| 1446 | | Star | Eridanus | 03^{h} 45^{m} 57.5^{s} | −04° 06′ 42″ | ? |
| 1447 | | Galaxy | Eridanus | 03^{h} 45^{m} 47.1^{s} | −09° 01′ 06″ | 14.7 |
| 1448 | | Spiral galaxy | Horologium | 03^{h} 44^{m} 31.3^{s} | −44° 38′ 45″ | 10.7 |
| 1449 | | Lenticular galaxy | Eridanus | 03^{h} 46^{m} 03^{s} | −04° 08′ 17″ | 13.5 |
| 1450 | | Galaxy | Eridanus | 03^{h} 45^{m} 36.5^{s} | −09° 14′ 05″ | 14.1 |
| 1451 | | Lenticular galaxy | Eridanus | 03^{h} 46^{m} 07.1^{s} | −04° 04′ 09″ | 13.4 |
| 1452 | | Barred lenticular galaxy | Eridanus | 03^{h} 45^{m} 22.3^{s} | −18° 37′ 59″ | 11.9 |
| 1453 | | Elliptical galaxy | Eridanus | 03^{h} 46^{m} 27.2^{s} | −03° 58′ 08″ | 11.6 |
| 1454 | | Star | Eridanus | 03^{h} 45^{m} 59.3^{s} | −20° 39′ 06″ | ? |
| 1455 | Duplicate of NGC 1452 | Barred lenticular galaxy | Eridanus | 03^{h} 45^{m} 22.3^{s} | −18° 37′ 59″ | 11.9 |
| 1456 | | Double star | Taurus | 03^{h} 48^{m} 08.3^{s} | +22° 33′ 30″ | ? |
| 1457 | Duplicate of NGC 1448 | Spiral galaxy | Horologium | 03^{h} 44^{m} 31.3^{s} | −44° 38′ 45″ | 10.7 |
| 1458 | | Unknown | Eridanus | 03^{h} 46^{m} 58.3^{s} | −18° 14′ 28″ | ? |
| 1459 | | Barred spiral galaxy | Reticulum | 03^{h} 46^{m} 57.9^{s} | −25° 31′ 17″ | 12.8 |
| 1460 | | Barred lenticular galaxy | Eridanus | 03^{h} 46^{m} 13.6^{s} | −36° 41′ 48″ | 12.5 |
| 1461 | | Lenticular galaxy | Eridanus | 03^{h} 48^{m} 27.1^{s} | −16° 23′ 34″ | 11.8 |
| 1462 | | Spiral galaxy | Taurus | 03^{h} 50^{m} 23.4^{s} | +06° 58′ 23″ | 14.4 |
| 1463 | | Spiral galaxy | Reticulum | 03^{h} 46^{m} 15.5^{s} | −59° 48′ 37″ | 13.3 |
| 1464 | | Galaxy | Eridanus | 03^{h} 51^{m} 24.4^{s} | −15° 24′ 08″ | 14.6 |
| 1465 | | Lenticular galaxy | Perseus | 03^{h} 53^{m} 31.9^{s} | +32° 29′ 34″ | 13.8 |
| 1466 | | Globular cluster | Hydrus | 03^{h} 44^{m} 33.4^{s} | −71° 40′ 18″ | 11.4 |
| 1467 | | Lenticular galaxy | Eridanus | 03^{h} 51^{m} 52.7^{s} | −08° 50′ 16″ | 14.1 |
| 1468 | | Lenticular galaxy | Eridanus | 03^{h} 52^{m} 12.5^{s} | −06° 20′ 55″ | 14.2 |
| 1469 | | Lenticular galaxy | Camelopardalis | 04^{h} 00^{m} 27.8^{s} | +68° 34′ 39″ | 13.2 |
| 1470 | | Spiral galaxy | Eridanus | 03^{h} 52^{m} 09.8^{s} | −09° 00′ 00″ | 14.2 |
| 1471 | Duplicate of NGC 1464 | Galaxy | Eridanus | 03^{h} 51^{m} 24.4^{s} | −15° 24′ 08″ | 14.6 |
| 1472 | | Galaxy | Eridanus | 03^{h} 53^{m} 47.3^{s} | −08° 34′ 05″ | 14.4 |
| 1473 | | Irregular galaxy | Hydrus | 03^{h} 47^{m} 26.2^{s} | −68° 13′ 14″ | 13 |
| 1474 | | Barred spiral galaxy | Taurus | 03^{h} 54^{m} 30.3^{s} | +10° 42′ 25″ | 13.9 |
| 1475 | | Star | Eridanus | 03^{h} 53^{m} 49.7^{s} | −08° 08′ 03″ | ? |
| 1476 | | Spiral galaxy | Horologium | 03^{h} 52^{m} 08.6^{s} | −44° 31′ 56″ | 13.1 |
| 1477 | | Galaxy | Eridanus | 03^{h} 54^{m} 02.8^{s} | −08° 34′ 28″ | 14.2 |
| 1478 | | Galaxy | Eridanus | 03^{h} 54^{m} 07.3^{s} | −08° 33′ 18″ | 14.8 |
| 1479 | Doesn't exist | Unknown | Eridanus | 03^{h} 54^{m} 20.4^{s} | −10° 12′ 31″ | ? |
| 1480 | Doesn't exist | Unknown | Eridanus | 03^{h} 54^{m} 32^{s} | −10° 15′ 30″ | ? |
| 1481 | | Lenticular galaxy | Eridanus | 03^{h} 54^{m} 28.9^{s} | −20° 25′ 36″ | 13.8 |
| 1482 | | Lenticular galaxy | Eridanus | 03^{h} 54^{m} 38.9^{s} | −20° 30′ 08″ | 13.3 |
| 1483 | | Barred spiral galaxy | Horologium | 03^{h} 52^{m} 47.7^{s} | −47° 28′ 42″ | 12.3 |
| 1484 | | Barred spiral galaxy | Eridanus | 03^{h} 54^{m} 17.4^{s} | −36° 58′ 15″ | 12.8 |
| 1485 | | Spiral galaxy | Camelopardalis | 04^{h} 05^{m} 03.4^{s} | +70° 59′ 48″ | 12.8 |
| 1486 | | Spiral galaxy | Eridanus | 03^{h} 56^{m} 18.8^{s} | −21° 49′ 15″ | 14.4 |
| 1487 | | Interacting galaxy | Eridanus | 03^{h} 55^{m} 45^{s} | −42° 22′ 04″ | 11.6 |
| 1488 | | Double star | Taurus | 04^{h} 00^{m} 04.7^{s} | +18° 34′ 00″ | ? |
| 1489 | | Barred spiral galaxy | Eridanus | 03^{h} 57^{m} 38.1^{s} | −19° 13′ 02″ | 13.8 |
| 1490 | | Elliptical galaxy | Reticulum | 03^{h} 53^{m} 34.1^{s} | −66° 01′ 05″ | 12.4 |
| 1491 | | Diffuse nebula | Perseus | 04^{h} 03^{m} 21^{s} | +51° 18.9′ 11.3″ | |
| 1492 | | Spiral galaxy | Eridanus | 03^{h} 58^{m} 13.1^{s} | −35° 26′ 45″ | 13.4 |
| 1493 | | Barred spiral galaxy | Horologium | 03^{h} 57^{m} 27.4555^{s} | −46° 12′ 38.554″ | 11.1 |
| 1494 | | Spiral galaxy | Horologium | 03^{h} 57^{m} 42.5^{s} | −48° 54′ 34″ | 11.6 |
| 1495 | | Spiral galaxy | Horologium | 03^{h} 58^{m} 21.4^{s} | −44° 27′ 57″ | 12.6 |
| 1496 | | Open cluster | Perseus | 04^{h} 04^{m} 31.8^{s} | +52° 39′ 41″ | 9.6 |
| 1497 | | Lenticular galaxy | Taurus | 04^{h} 02^{m} 06.8^{s} | +23° 08′ 00″ | 13.3 |
| 1498 | | Multiple star | Eridanus | 04^{h} 00^{m} 19.4^{s} | −12° 01′ 10″ | ? |
| 1499 | California Nebula | Diffuse nebula | Perseus | 04^{h} 03^{m} 18^{s} | +36° 25′ | 4.1 |
| 1500 | | Lenticular galaxy | Dorado | 03^{h} 58^{m} 14.0^{s} | −52° 19′ 44″ | 15.2 |

== 1501–1600 ==
| NGC number | Other names | Object type | Constellation | Right ascension (J2000) | Declination (J2000) | Apparent magnitude |
|---|---|---|---|---|---|---|
| 1501 | | Planetary nebula | Camelopardalis | 04^{h} 06^{m} 59.2^{s} | +60° 55′ 14″ | 15.2 |
| 1502 | | Open cluster | Camelopardalis | 04^{h} 08^{m} | +62° 20′ | 7.5 |
| 1503 | | Barred spiral galaxy | Reticulum | 03^{h} 56^{m} 33.3^{s} | −66° 02′ 26″ | 13.6 |
| 1504 | | Elliptical galaxy | Eridanus | 04^{h} 02^{m} 29.6^{s} | −09° 20′ 06″ | 14.4 |
| 1505 | | Spiral galaxy | Eridanus | 04^{h} 02^{m} 36.3^{s} | −09° 19′ 19″ | 13.7 |
| 1506 | | Lenticular galaxy | Dorado | 04^{h} 00^{m} 21.6^{s} | −52° 34′ 24″ | 13.4 |
| 1507 | | Barred spiral galaxy | Eridanus | 04^{h} 04^{m} 27.2^{s} | −02° 11′ 19″ | 12.3 |
| 1508 | | Spiral galaxy | Taurus | 04^{h} 05^{m} 47.6^{s} | +25° 24′ 33″ | 14.5 |
| 1509 | | Spiral galaxy | Eridanus | 04^{h} 03^{m} 55.1^{s} | −11° 10′ 43″ | 13.7 |
| 1510 | | Lenticular galaxy | Horologium | 04^{h} 03^{m} 32.4^{s} | −43° 24′ 03″ | 13.5 |
| 1511 | | Barred spiral galaxy | Hydrus | 03^{h} 59^{m} 36.98^{s} | −67° 38′ 03.3″ | 12.1 |
| 1512 | | Spiral galaxy | Horologium | 04^{h} 03^{m} 54.3^{s} | −43° 20′ 56″ | 11.5 |
| 1513 | | Open cluster | Perseus | 04^{h} 11^{m} | +49° 31′ | 8.7 |
| 1514 | | Planetary nebula | Taurus | 04^{h} 09^{m} 17.0^{s} | +30° 46′ 33″ | 10.0 |
| 1515 | | Spiral galaxy | Dorado | 04^{h} 04^{m} 02.9^{s} | −54° 06′ 10″ | 11.83 |
| 1515A/1516 | | Barred spiral galaxy | Dorado | 04^{h} 03^{m} 50.0^{s} | −54° 06′ 47″ | 14.6 |
| 1517 | | Spiral galaxy | Taurus | 04^{h} 09^{m} 11.9^{s} | +08° 38′ 56″ | 13.4 |
| 1518 | | Barred spiral galaxy | Eridanus | 04^{h} 06^{m} 49.0^{s} | −21° 10′ 46″ | 11.8 |
| 1519 | | Barred spiral galaxy | Eridanus | 04^{h} 08^{m} 07.2^{s} | −17° 11′ 34″ | 12.9 |
| 1520 | | Open cluster | Mensa | 03^{h} 57^{m} 51.1^{s} | −76° 48′ 20″ | |
| 1521 | | Elliptical galaxy | Eridanus | 04^{h} 08^{m} 18.7^{s} | −21° 03′ 06″ | 11.4 |
| 1522 | | Lenticular galaxy | Dorado | 04^{h} 06^{m} 07.6^{s} | −52° 40′ 10″ | 13.6 |
| 1523 | | Asterism | Dorado | 04^{h} 06^{m} 11.0^{s} | −54° 05′ 16″ | |
| 1524 | NGC 1516A (Note: NGC 1516 refers to the galaxy pair NGC 1524 and NGC 1525) | Barred spiral galaxy | Eridanus | 04^{h} 08^{m} 07.5^{s} | −08° 49′ 46″ | 14.6 |
| 1525 | NGC 1516B | Spiral galaxy | Eridanus | 04^{h} 08^{m} 08.2^{s} | −08° 50′ 05″ | 13.8 |
| 1526 | | Barred spiral galaxy | Reticulum | 04^{h} 05^{m} 12.3^{s} | −65° 50′ 24″ | 13.7 |
| 1527 | | Lenticular galaxy | Horologium | 04^{h} 08^{m} 24.1^{s} | −47° 53′ 48″ | 10.8 |
| 1528 | | Open cluster | Perseus | 04^{h} 15^{m} 19.0^{s} | +51° 12′ 42″ | 6.4 |
| 1529 | | Lenticular galaxy | Reticulum | 04^{h} 07^{m} 19.9^{s} | −62° 53′ 58″ | 13.3 |
| 1530 | | Spiral galaxy | Camelopardalis | 04^{h} 23^{m} 27.0^{s} | +75° 17′ 46″ | 13.4 |
| 1531 | | Lenticular galaxy | Eridanus | 04^{h} 11^{m} 59.2^{s} | −32° 51′ 03″ | 12.9 |
| 1532 | | Spiral galaxy | Eridanus | 04^{h} 12^{m} 04.3^{s} | −32° 52′ 27″ | 10.7 |
| 1533 | | Lenticular galaxy | Dorado | 04^{h} 09^{m} 51.5^{s} | −56° 07′ 10″ | 11.9 |
| 1534 | | Lenticular galaxy | Reticulum | 04^{h} 08^{m} 46.0^{s} | −62° 47′ 45″ | 12 |
| 1535 | | Planetary nebula | Eridanus | 04^{h} 14^{m} 15.8^{s} | −12° 44′ 22″ | 11.6 |
| 1536 | | Barred spiral galaxy | Reticulum | 04^{h} 11^{m} 00.2^{s} | −56° 28′ 57″ | 12.5 |
| 1537 | | Elliptical galaxy | Eridanus | 04^{h} 13^{m} 40.7^{s} | −31° 38′ 44″ | 10.6 |
| 1538 | | Spiral galaxy | Eridanus | 04^{h} 14^{m} 56.0^{s} | −13° 11′ 29″ | 15.1 |
| 1539 | (Identification uncertain) | Galaxy | Taurus | 04^{h} 19^{m} 01.9^{s} | +26° 49′ 39″ | 14.8 |
| 1540 | | Interacting galaxy | Eridanus | 04^{h} 15^{m} 10.5^{s} | −28° 28′ 58″ | 13.9 |
| 1541 | | Lenticular galaxy | Taurus | 04^{h} 17^{m} 00.2^{s} | +00° 50′ 07″ | 13.6 |
| 1542 | | Spiral galaxy | Taurus | 04^{h} 17^{m} 14.1^{s} | +04° 46′ 55″ | 13.9 |
| 1543 | | Barred lenticular galaxy | Reticulum | 04^{h} 12^{m} 43.1^{s} | −57° 44′ 14″ | 10.5 |
| 1544 | | Spiral galaxy | Cepheus | 05^{h} 02^{m} 36.2^{s} | +86° 13′ 22″ | 13.3 |
| 1545 | | Open cluster | Perseus | 04^{h} 20^{m} 56.2^{s} | +50° 15′ 19″ | 6.2 |
| 1546 | | Spiral galaxy | Dorado | 04^{h} 14^{m} 36.7^{s} | −56° 03′ 37″ | 10.9 |
| 1547 | | Barred spiral galaxy | Eridanus | 04^{h} 17^{m} 12.3^{s} | −17° 51′ 27″ | 13.4 |
| 1548 | | Globular cluster | Perseus | 04^{h} 20^{m} 49.6^{s} | +36° 53′ 55″ | |
| 1549 | | Elliptical galaxy | Dorado | 04^{h} 15^{m} 45.0^{s} | −55° 35′ 29″ | 9.8 |
| 1550 | | Lenticular galaxy | Taurus | 04^{h} 19^{m} 38.1^{s} | +02° 24′ 34″ | 12 |
| 1551 | Duplicate of NGC 1550 | Elliptical galaxy | Taurus | 04^{h} 19^{m} 38.1^{s} | +02° 24′ 34″ | 12 |
| 1552 | | Lenticular galaxy | Eridanus | 04^{h} 20^{m} 17.6^{s} | −00° 41′ 33″ | 12.9 |
| 1553 | | Lenticular galaxy | Dorado | 04^{h} 16^{m} 10.6^{s} | −55° 46′ 46″ | 9.4 |
| 1554 | Struve's Lost Nebula | Reflection nebula | Taurus | 04^{h} 21^{m} 43.5^{s} | +19° 31′ 16″ | |
| 1555 | Hind's Variable Nebula | Reflection nebula | Taurus | 04^{h} 21^{m} 57.1^{s} | +19° 32′ 07″ | |
| 1556 | | Spiral galaxy | Dorado | 04^{h} 17^{m} 44.7^{s} | −50° 09′ 51″ | 13.1 |
| 1557 | | Open cluster | Hydrus | 04^{h} 13^{m} 14.0^{s} | −70° 30′ 30″ | |
| 1558 | | Barred spiral galaxy | Caelum | 04^{h} 20^{m} 15.7^{s} | −45° 01′ 52″ | 12.4 |
| 1559 | | Spiral galaxy | Reticulum | 04^{h} 17^{m} 37.3^{s} | −62° 47′ 03″ | 10.9 |
| 1560 | | Spiral galaxy | Camelopardalis | 04^{h} 32^{m} 47.7^{s} | +71° 52′ 46″ | 12.1 |
| 1561 | | Elliptical galaxy | Eridanus | 04^{h} 23^{m} 01.0^{s} | −15° 50′ 43″ | 13.8 |
| 1562 | | Spiral galaxy | Eridanus | 04^{h} 21^{m} 47.6^{s} | −15° 45′ 19″ | 14.3 |
| 1563 | | Elliptical galaxy | Eridanus | 04^{h} 22^{m} 53.9^{s} | −15° 43′ 58″ | 15 |
| 1564 | | Spiral galaxy | Eridanus | 04^{h} 23^{m} 00.9^{s} | −15° 44′ 20″ | 14.6 |
| 1565 | | Spiral galaxy | Eridanus | 04^{h} 23^{m} 23.6^{s} | −15° 44′ 41″ | 14 |
| 1566 | | Spiral galaxy | Dorado | 04^{h} 20^{m} 00.6^{s} | −54° 56′ 17″ | 10.2 |
| 1567 | | Lenticular galaxy | Caelum | 04^{h} 21^{m} 09.0^{s} | −48° 15′ 17″ | |
| 1568 | | Interacting galaxy | Eridanus | 04^{h} 24^{m} 25.4^{s} | −00° 44′ 48″ | 14.9 |
| 1569 | | Irregular galaxy | Camelopardalis | 04^{h} 30^{m} 49.3^{s} | +64° 50′ 53″ | 11.8 |
| 1570 | | Elliptical galaxy | Caelum | 04^{h} 22^{m} 08.9^{s} | −43° 37′ 48″ | 12.3 |
| 1571 | Duplicate of NGC 1570 | Elliptical galaxy | Caelum | 04^{h} 22^{m} 08.9^{s} | −43° 37′ 48″ | 12.3 |
| 1572 | | Barred spiral galaxy | Caelum | 04^{h} 22^{m} 42.7^{s} | −40° 36′ 04″ | 12.4 |
| 1573 | | Elliptical galaxy | Camelopardalis | 04^{h} 35^{m} 04.2^{s} | +73° 15′ 47″ | 11.7 |
| 1573A | UGC 3150 | Barred spiral galaxy | Camelopardalis | 04^{h} 48^{m} 26.7^{s} | +73° 28′ 10″ | 14 |
| 1574 | | Lenticular galaxy | Reticulum | 04^{h} 21^{m} 58.6^{s} | −56° 58′ 28″ | 10.4 |
| 1575 | | Barred spiral galaxy | Eridanus | 04^{h} 26^{m} 20.5^{s} | −10° 05′ 56″ | 12.6 |
| 1576 | | Lenticular galaxy | Eridanus | 04^{h} 26^{m} 18.7^{s} | −03° 37′ 15″ | 13.3 |
| 1577 | Duplicate of NGC 1575 | Barred spiral galaxy | Eridanus | 04^{h} 26^{m} 20.5^{s} | −10° 05′ 56″ | 12.6 |
| 1578 | | Spiral galaxy | Dorado | 04^{h} 23^{m} 46.7^{s} | −51° 35′ 58″ | 13.1 |
| 1579 | | Diffuse nebula | Perseus | 04^{h} 30^{m} 09.5^{s} | +35° 16′ 19″ | |
| 1580 | | Spiral galaxy | Eridanus | 04^{h} 28^{m} 18.4^{s} | −05° 10′ 45″ | 13.5 |
| 1581 | | Lenticular galaxy | Dorado | 04^{h} 24^{m} 44.9^{s} | −54° 56′ 32″ | 12.9 |
| 1582 | | Open cluster | Perseus | 04^{h} 31^{m} 39.0^{s} | +43° 44′ 36″ | 7 |
| 1583 | | Lenticular galaxy | Eridanus | 04^{h} 28^{m} 20.7^{s} | −17° 35′ 46″ | 13.7 |
| 1584 | | Lenticular galaxy | Eridanus | 04^{h} 28^{m} 10.2^{s} | −17° 31′ 26″ | 14 |
| 1585 | | Spiral galaxy | Caelum | 04^{h} 27^{m} 33.0^{s} | −42° 09′ 54″ | 13.5 |
| 1586 | | Spiral galaxy | Eridanus | 04^{h} 30^{m} 38.2^{s} | −00° 18′ 19″ | 13.2 |
| 1587 | | Elliptical galaxy | Taurus | 04^{h} 30^{m} 40.0^{s} | +00° 39′ 45″ | 11.7 |
| 1588 | | Elliptical galaxy | Taurus | 04^{h} 30^{m} 43.7^{s} | +00° 39′ 55″ | 12.9 |
| 1589 | | Spiral galaxy | Taurus | 04^{h} 30^{m} 45.4^{s} | +00° 51′ 48″ | 11.8 |
| 1590 | | Spiral galaxy | Taurus | 04^{h} 31^{m} 10.2^{s} | +07° 37′ 51″ | 13.7 |
| 1591 | | Barred spiral galaxy | Eridanus | 04^{h} 29^{m} 30.7^{s} | −26° 42′ 46″ | 12.9 |
| 1592 | | Spiral galaxy | Eridanus | 04^{h} 29^{m} 40.7^{s} | −27° 24′ 29″ | 13.6 |
| 1593 | | Lenticular galaxy | Taurus | 04^{h} 32^{m} 06.1^{s} | +00° 34′ 04″ | 13.4 |
| 1594 | | Barred spiral galaxy | Eridanus | 04^{h} 30^{m} 51.5^{s} | −05° 47′ 52″ | 13 |
| 1595 | | Elliptical galaxy | Caelum | 04^{h} 28^{m} 21.6^{s} | −47° 48′ 55″ | 12.7 |
| 1596 | | Lenticular galaxy | Dorado | 04^{h} 27^{m} 38.0^{s} | −55° 01′ 35″ | 11.2 |
| 1597 | | Elliptical galaxy | Eridanus | 04^{h} 31^{m} 13.4^{s} | −11° 17′ 24″ | 13.9 |
| 1598 | | Barred spiral galaxy | Caelum | 04^{h} 28^{m} 33.4^{s} | −47° 46′ 57″ | 13.3 |
| 1599 | | Spiral galaxy | Eridanus | 04^{h} 31^{m} 38.8^{s} | −04° 35′ 19″ | 13.7 |
| 1600 | | Elliptical galaxy | Eridanus | 04^{h} 31^{m} 39.9^{s} | −05° 05′ 14″ | 10.9 |

== 1601–1700 ==
| NGC number | Other names | Object type | Constellation | Right ascension (J2000) | Declination (J2000) | Apparent magnitude |
|---|---|---|---|---|---|---|
| 1601 | | Lenticular galaxy | Eridanus | 04^{h} 31^{m} 41.7^{s} | −05° 03′ 35″ | 13.8 |
| 1602 | | Irregular galaxy | Dorado | 04^{h} 27^{m} 54.4^{s} | −55° 03′ 24″ | 13.0 |
| 1603 | | Elliptical galaxy | Eridanus | 04^{h} 31^{m} 49.9^{s} | −05° 05′ 38″ | 13.8 |
| 1604 | | Spiral galaxy | Eridanus | 04^{h} 31^{m} 58.5^{s} | −05° 22′ 10″ | 13.7 |
| 1605 | | Open cluster | Perseus | 04^{h} 34^{m} 52.2^{s} | +45° 16′ 17″ | 10.7 |
| 1606 | | Lenticular galaxy | Eridanus | 04^{h} 32^{m} 03.3^{s} | −05° 01′ 55″ | 14.9 |
| 1607 | | Spiral galaxy | Eridanus | 04^{h} 32^{m} 03.1^{s} | −04° 27′ 38″ | 13.2 |
| 1608 | Duplicate of NGC 1593 | Lenticular galaxy | Taurus | 04^{h} 32^{m} 06.1^{s} | +00° 34′ 04″ | 13.4 |
| 1609 | | Lenticular galaxy | Eridanus | 04^{h} 32^{m} 45.0^{s} | −04° 22′ 19″ | 13.5 |
| 1610 | | Unknown | Eridanus | 04^{h} 32^{m} 44.7^{s} | −04° 34′ 55″ | |
| 1611 | | Barred lenticular galaxy | Eridanus | 04^{h} 33^{m} 05.8^{s} | −04° 17′ 49″ | 13.4 |
| 1612 | | Barred lenticular galaxy | Eridanus | 04^{h} 33^{m} 13.1^{s} | −04° 10′ 19″ | 13.4 |
| 1613 | | Lenticular galaxy | Eridanus | 04^{h} 33^{m} 25.3^{s} | −04° 15′ 54″ | 13.7 |
| 1614 | | Barred spiral galaxy | Eridanus | 04^{h} 33^{m} 59.8^{s} | −08° 34′ 45″ | 12.9 |
| 1615 | | Lenticular galaxy | Taurus | 04^{h} 36^{m} 01.9^{s} | +19° 57′ 03″ | 13.9 |
| 1616 | | Intermediate spiral galaxy | Caelum | 04^{h} 32^{m} 41.9^{s} | −43° 42′ 54″ | 12.6 |
| 1617 | | Barred spiral galaxy | Dorado | 04^{h} 31^{m} 39.5^{s} | −54° 36′ 07″ | 10.4 |
| 1618 | | Barred spiral galaxy | Eridanus | 04^{h} 36^{m} 06.6^{s} | −03° 08′ 55″ | 12.7 |
| 1619 | Duplicate of NGC 1610 | Unknown | Eridanus | 04^{h} 36^{m} 11.4^{s} | −04° 49′ 57″ | |
| 1620 | | Spiral galaxy | Eridanus | 04^{h} 36^{m} 37.2^{s} | −00° 08′ 39″ | 12.3 |
| 1621 | | Elliptical galaxy | Eridanus | 04^{h} 36^{m} 25.0^{s} | −04° 59′ 12″ | 13.6 |
| 1622 | | Barred spiral galaxy | Eridanus | 04^{h} 36^{m} 36.6^{s} | −03° 11′ 18″ | 12.5 |
| 1623 | | Barred spiral galaxy | Eridanus | 04^{h} 35^{m} 32.2^{s} | −13° 33′ 23″ | 15.6 |
| 1624 | | Open cluster | Perseus | 04^{h} 40^{m} 36.4^{s} | +50° 27′ 42″ | 11.8 |
| 1625 | | Barred spiral galaxy | Eridanus | 04^{h} 37^{m} 06.3^{s} | −03° 18′ 14″ | 12.3 |
| 1626 | Duplicate of NGC 1621 | Elliptical galaxy | Eridanus | 04^{h} 36^{m} 25.0^{s} | −04° 59′ 12″ | 13.6 |
| 1627 | | Spiral galaxy | Eridanus | 04^{h} 37^{m} 37.9^{s} | −04° 53′ 17″ | 12.8 |
| 1628 | | Spiral galaxy | Eridanus | 04^{h} 37^{m} 36.1^{s} | −04° 42′ 57″ | 13.4 |
| 1629 | (Located in Large Magellanic Cloud) | Globular cluster | Hydrus | 04^{h} 29^{m} 37.0^{s} | −71° 50′ 18″ | 12.7 |
| 1630 | | Lenticular galaxy | Eridanus | 04^{h} 37^{m} 15.4^{s} | −18° 54′ 07″ | 14.0 |
| 1631 | | Barred lenticular galaxy | Eridanus | 04^{h} 38^{m} 24.1^{s} | −20° 39′ 01″ | 13.3 |
| 1632 | | Spiral galaxy | Eridanus | 04^{h} 39^{m} 58.5^{s} | −09° 27′ 21″ | 14.4 |
| 1633 | | Barred spiral galaxy | Taurus | 04^{h} 40^{m} 09.1^{s} | +07° 20′ 59″ | 13.5 |
| 1634 | | Elliptical galaxy | Taurus | 04^{h} 40^{m} 09.8^{s} | +07° 20′ 20″ | 14.1 |
| 1635 | | Barred lenticular galaxy | Eridanus | 04^{h} 40^{m} 07.9^{s} | −00° 32′ 50″ | 12.4 |
| 1636 | | Spiral galaxy | Eridanus | 04^{h} 40^{m} 40.2^{s} | −08° 36′ 28″ | 13.0 |
| 1637 | | Spiral galaxy | Eridanus | 04^{h} 41^{m} 28.1^{s} | −02° 51′ 29″ | 11.2 |
| 1638 | | Lenticular galaxy | Eridanus | 04^{h} 41^{m} 36.4^{s} | −01° 48′ 30″ | 12.0 |
| 1639 | | Triple star | Eridanus | 04^{h} 40^{m} 52.3^{s} | −16° 59′ 29″ | |
| 1640 | | Barred spiral galaxy | Eridanus | 04^{h} 42^{m} 14.5^{s} | −20° 26′ 05″ | 11.7 |
| 1641 | | Open cluster | Dorado | 04^{h} 35^{m} 38.0^{s} | −65° 46′ 06″ | |
| 1642 | | Spiral galaxy | Taurus | 04^{h} 42^{m} 54.9^{s} | +00° 37′ 08″ | 12.6 |
| 1643 | | Barred spiral galaxy | Eridanus | 04^{h} 43^{m} 43.933^{s} | −05° 19′ 09.562″ | 14 |
| 1644 | | Globular cluster | Dorado | 04^{h} 37^{m} 39.6^{s} | −66° 11′ 49″ | 12.9 |
| 1645 | | Barred lenticular galaxy | Eridanus | 04^{h} 44^{m} 06.3^{s} | −05° 27′ 54″ | 13.0 |
| 1646 | | Elliptical galaxy | Eridanus | 04^{h} 44^{m} 23.5^{s} | −08° 31′ 53″ | 12.4 |
| 1647 | | Open cluster | Taurus | 04^{h} 45^{m} 42.2^{s} | +19° 07′ 09″ | 6.4 |
| 1648 | | Spiral galaxy | Eridanus | 04^{h} 44^{m} 34.7^{s} | −08° 28′ 42″ | 14.6 |
| 1649 | Duplicate of NGC 1652 | Open cluster | Dorado | 04^{h} 38^{m} 22.9^{s} | −68° 40′ 23″ | 13.1 |
| 1650 | | Elliptical galaxy | Eridanus | 04^{h} 45^{m} 11.4^{s} | −15° 52′ 12″ | 12.7 |
| 1651 | | Globular cluster | Mensa | 04^{h} 37^{m} 32.7^{s} | −70° 35′ 08″ | 12.3 |
| 1652 | (Located in Large Magellanic Cloud) | Globular cluster | Dorado | 04^{h} 38^{m} 22.9^{s} | −68° 40′ 23″ | 13.1 |
| 1653 | | Elliptical galaxy | Eridanus | 04^{h} 45^{m} 47.5^{s} | −02° 23′ 34″ | 12.0 |
| 1654 | | Spiral galaxy | Eridanus | 04^{h} 45^{m} 48.4^{s} | −02° 05′ 00″ | 13.4 |
| 1655 | | Double star | Taurus | 04^{h} 47^{m} 11.8^{s} | +20° 55′ 25″ | |
| 1656 | | Lenticular galaxy | Eridanus | 04^{h} 45^{m} 53.3^{s} | −05° 08′ 11″ | 12.9 |
| 1657 | | Barred spiral galaxy | Eridanus | 04^{h} 46^{m} 07.3^{s} | −02° 04′ 37″ | 13.8 |
| 1658 | | Galaxy | Caelum | 04^{h} 44^{m} 01.1^{s} | −41° 27′ 49″ | 13.5 |
| 1659 | | Galaxy | Eridanus | 04^{h} 46^{m} 30.0^{s} | −04° 47′ 19″ | 12.5 |
| 1660 | | Spiral galaxy | Caelum | 04^{h} 44^{m} 11.1^{s} | −41° 29′ 52″ | 14.0 |
| 1661 | | Galaxy | Orion | 04^{h} 47^{m} 07.7^{s} | −02° 03′ 18″ | 13.2 |
| 1662 | | Open cluster | Orion | 04^{h} 48^{m} 27.0^{s} | +10° 55′ 48″ | 6.4 |
| 1663 | | Open cluster | Orion | 04^{h} 49^{m} 24.3^{s} | +13° 08′ 27″ | 14.5 |
| 1664 | | Open cluster | Auriga | 04^{h} 51^{m} 05.4^{s} | +43° 40′ 34″ | 7.6 |
| 1665 | | Lenticular galaxy | Eridanus | 04^{h} 48^{m} 17.0^{s} | −05° 25′ 38″ | 12.8 |
| 1666 | | Barred lenticular galaxy | Eridanus | 04^{h} 48^{m} 32.8^{s} | −06° 34′ 10″ | 12.6 |
| 1667 | | Barred spiral galaxy | Eridanus | 04^{h} 48^{m} 37.0^{s} | −06° 19′ 13″ | 12.1 |
| 1668 | | Lenticular galaxy | Caelum | 04^{h} 46^{m} 05.9^{s} | −44° 43′ 58″ | 12.8 |
| 1669 | | Spiral galaxy | Dorado | 04^{h} 43^{m} 00.0^{s} | −65° 48′ 51″ | 13.8 |
| 1670 | | Lenticular galaxy | Orion | 04^{h} 49^{m} 42.6^{s} | −02° 45′ 36″ | 12.8 |
| 1671 | | Lenticular galaxy | Orion | 04^{h} 49^{m} 33.8^{s} | +00° 15′ 12″ | 12.9 |
| 1672 | | Barred spiral galaxy | Dorado | 04^{h} 45^{m} 42.1^{s} | −59° 14′ 56″ | 11.0 |
| 1673 | (Located in Large Magellanic Cloud) | Open cluster | Mensa | 04^{h} 42^{m} 39.7^{s} | −69° 49′ 17″ | 14.1 |
| 1674 | | Unknown | Taurus | 04^{h} 52^{m} 25.0^{s} | +23° 51′ 37″ | |
| 1675 | | Unknown | Taurus | 04^{h} 52^{m} 25.0^{s} | +23° 51′ 37″ | |
| 1676 | (Located in Large Magellanic Cloud) | Open cluster | Dorado | 04^{h} 43^{m} 54.2^{s} | −68° 49′ 40″ | |
| 1677 | Duplicate of NGC 1659 | Galaxy | Eridanus | 04^{h} 46^{m} 30.0^{s} | −04° 47′ 19″ | 12.5 |
| 1678 | | Lenticular galaxy | Orion | 04^{h} 51^{m} 35.4^{s} | −02° 37′ 22″ | 13.2 |
| 1679 | | Barred spiral galaxy | Caelum | 04^{h} 49^{m} 55.5^{s} | −31° 58′ 02″ | 11.6 |
| 1680 | | Barred spiral galaxy | Pictor | 04^{h} 48^{m} 33.7^{s} | −47° 49′ 00″ | 13.6 |
| 1681 | | Spiral galaxy | Eridanus | 04^{h} 51^{m} 50.1^{s} | −05° 48′ 11″ | 12.9 |
| 1682 | | Elliptical galaxy | Orion | 04^{h} 52^{m} 19.7^{s} | −03° 06′ 19″ | 13.5 |
| 1683 | | Spiral galaxy | Orion | 04^{h} 52^{m} 17.5^{s} | −03° 01′ 27″ | 14.7 |
| 1684 | | Elliptical galaxy | Orion | 04^{h} 52^{m} 31.1^{s} | −03° 06′ 20″ | 12.0 |
| 1685 | | Barred lenticular galaxy | Orion | 04^{h} 52^{m} 34.2^{s} | −02° 56′ 59″ | 14.1 |
| 1686 | | Galaxy | Eridanus | 04^{h} 52^{m} 54.7^{s} | −15° 20′ 47″ | 13.7 |
| 1687 | | Barred spiral galaxy | Caelum | 04^{h} 51^{m} 21.1^{s} | −33° 56′ 21″ | 13.9 |
| 1688 | | Barred spiral galaxy | Dorado | 04^{h} 48^{m} 23.5^{s} | −59° 48′ 00″ | 12.1 |
| 1689 | Duplicate of NGC 1667 | Barred spiral galaxy | Eridanus | 04^{h} 48^{m} 37.0^{s} | −06° 19′ 13″ | 12.1 |
| 1690 | | Elliptical galaxy | Orion | 04^{h} 54^{m} 19.3^{s} | +01° 38′ 26″ | 14.3 |
| 1691 | | Barred lenticular galaxy | Orion | 04^{h} 54^{m} 38.3^{s} | +03° 16′ 04″ | 12.0 |
| 1692 | | Lenticular galaxy | Eridanus | 04^{h} 55^{m} 23.7^{s} | −20° 34′ 16″ | 13.0 |
| 1693 | (Located in Large Magellanic Cloud) | Open cluster | Dorado | 04^{h} 47^{m} 38.8^{s} | −69° 20′ 37″ | 12.9 |
| 1694 | | Spiral galaxy | Eridanus | 04^{h} 55^{m} 16.8^{s} | −04° 39′ 08″ | 14.3 |
| 1695 | (Located in Large Magellanic Cloud) | Open cluster | Dorado | 04^{h} 47^{m} 44.5^{s} | −69° 22′ 26″ | 12.2 |
| 1696 | (Located in Large Magellanic Cloud) | Globular cluster | Dorado | 04^{h} 48^{m} 30.0^{s} | −68° 14′ 35″ | 14.0 |
| 1697 | (Located in Large Magellanic Cloud) | Open cluster | Dorado | 04^{h} 48^{m} 36.4^{s} | −68° 33′ 29″ | 12.6 |
| 1698 | (Located in Large Magellanic Cloud) | Open cluster | Dorado | 04^{h} 49^{m} 04.5^{s} | −69° 06′ 49″ | 12.1 |
| 1699 | | Spiral galaxy | Eridanus | 04^{h} 56^{m} 59.5^{s} | −04° 45′ 26″ | 13.9 |
| 1700 | | Elliptical galaxy | Eridanus | 04^{h} 56^{m} 56.3^{s} | −04° 51′ 52″ | 12 |

== 1701–1800 ==
| NGC number | Other names | Object type | Constellation | Right ascension (J2000) | Declination (J2000) | Apparent magnitude |
|---|---|---|---|---|---|---|
| 1701 | Enterprise Galaxy | Spiral galaxy | Caelum | 04^{h} 55^{m} 51.1^{s} | −29° 53′ 01″ | 12.8 |
| 1702 | (Located in Large Magellanic Cloud) | Open cluster | Mensa | 04^{h} 49^{m} 27.7^{s} | −69° 51′ 03″ | 12.5 |
| 1703 | | Barred spiral galaxy | Dorado | 04^{h} 52^{m} 51.9^{s} | −59° 44′ 34″ | 11.3 |
| 1704 | (Located in Large Magellanic Cloud) | Open cluster | Dorado | 04^{h} 49^{m} 55.5^{s} | −69° 45′ 23″ | 11.5 |
| 1705 | | Lenticular galaxy | Pictor | 04^{h} 54^{m} 13.7^{s} | −53° 21′ 40″ | 12.8 |
| 1706 | | Spiral galaxy | Dorado | 04^{h} 52^{m} 31.1^{s} | −62° 59′ 10″ | 12.6 |
| 1707 | | Open cluster | Orion | 04^{h} 58^{m} 21.1^{s} | +08° 14′ 20″ | |
| 1708 | | Open cluster | Camelopardalis | 05^{h} 03^{m} 27.0^{s} | +52° 50′ 00″ | |
| 1709 | | Barred lenticular galaxy | Orion | 04^{h} 58^{m} 44.0^{s} | −00° 28′ 40″ | 14.2 |
| 1710 | | Lenticular galaxy | Lepus | 04^{h} 57^{m} 16.8^{s} | −15° 17′ 20″ | 12.7 |
| 1711 | (Located in Large Magellanic Cloud) | Open cluster | Mensa | 04^{h} 50^{m} 36.2^{s} | −69° 59′ 08″ | 10.1 |
| 1712 | (Located in Large Magellanic Cloud) | Open cluster | Dorado | 04^{h} 50^{m} 58.5^{s} | −69° 24′ 27″ | |
| 1713 | | Elliptical galaxy | Orion | 04^{h} 58^{m} 54.7^{s} | −00° 29′ 19″ | 12.7 |
| 1714 | (Located in Large Magellanic Cloud) | Open cluster | Dorado | 04^{h} 52^{m} 08.4^{s} | −66° 55′ 23″ | 11.5 |
| 1715 | (Located in Large Magellanic Cloud) | Diffuse nebula | Dorado | 04^{h} 52^{m} 10^{s} | −66° 54′ | |
| 1716 | | Barred spiral galaxy | Lepus | 04^{h} 58^{m} 13.3221^{s} | −20° 21′ 49.347″ | 13.90 |
| 1717 | | Spiral galaxy | Orion | 04^{h} 58^{m} 44.0^{s} | −00° 28′ 40″ | 14.2 |
| 1718 | (Located in Large Magellanic Cloud) | Open cluster | Dorado | 04^{h} 52^{m} 25.4^{s} | −67° 03′ 03″ | 12.3 |
| 1719 | | Spiral galaxy | Orion | 04^{h} 59^{m} 34.5^{s} | −00° 15′ 38″ | 13.6 |
| 1720 | | Barred spiral galaxy | Eridanus | 04^{h} 59^{m} 20.5^{s} | −07° 51′ 33″ | 12.4 |
| 1721 | | Barred spiral galaxy | Eridanus | 04^{h} 59^{m} 17.4^{s} | −11° 07′ 06″ | 12.8 |
| 1722 | (Within boundaries of Large Magellanic Cloud) | Open cluster | Dorado | 04^{h} 51^{m} 50.7^{s} | −69° 23′ 56″ | 13.2 |
| 1723 | | Barred spiral galaxy | Eridanus | 04^{h} 59^{m} 25.9^{s} | −10° 58′ 50″ | 11.7 |
| 1724 | | Open cluster | Auriga | 05^{h} 03^{m} 33.0^{s} | +49° 29′ 30″ | |
| 1725 | | Lenticular galaxy | Eridanus | 04^{h} 59^{m} 22.9^{s} | −11° 12′ 58″ | 13 |
| 1726 | | Lenticular galaxy | Eridanus | 04^{h} 59^{m} 41.9^{s} | −07° 45′ 18″ | 11.7 |
| 1727 | | Star forming region | Dorado | 04^{h} 52^{m} 20.0^{s} | −69° 20′ 42″ | 11.1 |
| 1728 | | Spiral galaxy | Eridanus | 04^{h} 59^{m} 27.8^{s} | −11° 07′ 24″ | 13.9 |
| 1729 | | Spiral galaxy | Orion | 05^{h} 00^{m} 15.6^{s} | −03° 21′ 11″ | 12.9 |
| 1730 | | Barred spiral galaxy | Lepus | 04^{h} 59^{m} 31.7^{s} | −15° 49′ 24″ | 12.3 |
| 1731 | (Located in Large Magellanic Cloud) | Star cluster | Dorado | 04^{h} 53^{m} 32.1^{s} | −66° 55′ 31″ | 9.9 |
| 1732 | (Located in Large Magellanic Cloud) | Open cluster | Dorado | 04^{h} 53^{m} 10.6^{s} | −68° 39′ 00″ | 12.3 |
| 1733 | (Located in Large Magellanic Cloud) | Open cluster | Dorado | 04^{h} 54^{m} 04.8^{s} | −66° 40′ 58″ | 13.3 |
| 1734 | (Located in Large Magellanic Cloud) | Open cluster | Dorado | 04^{h} 53^{m} 33.6^{s} | −68° 46′ 08″ | 13.1 |
| 1735 | (Located in Large Magellanic Cloud) | Open cluster | Dorado | 04^{h} 54^{m} 19.7^{s} | −67° 05′ 59″ | 10.8 |
| 1736 | (Located in Large Magellanic Cloud) | Emission nebula | Dorado | 04^{h} 53^{m} 01.6^{s} | −68° 03′ 12″ | |
| 1737 | (Located in Large Magellanic Cloud) | Emission nebula | Dorado | 04^{h} 53^{m} 57.8^{s} | −69° 10′ 28″ | |
| 1738 | | Barred spiral galaxy | Lepus | 05^{h} 01^{m} 46.5^{s} | −18° 09′ 27″ | 12.9 |
| 1739 | | Galaxy | Lepus | 05^{h} 01^{m} 47.3^{s} | −18° 10′ 02″ | 13.5 |
| 1740 | | Lenticular galaxy | Orion | 05^{h} 01^{m} 54.7^{s} | −03° 17′ 45″ | 12.9 |
| 1741A | | Spiral galaxy | Eridanus | 05^{h} 01^{m} 38.7^{s} | −04° 15′ 32″ | 15.0 |
| 1741B | | Spiral galaxy | Eridanus | 05^{h} 01^{m} 35.4^{s} | −04° 15′ 48″ | 14.6 |
| 1742 | | Star | Orion | 05^{h} 02^{m} 00.5^{s} | −03° 17′ 14″ | |
| 1743 | (Located in Large Magellanic Cloud) | Emission nebula | Dorado | 04^{h} 54^{m} 03.2^{s} | −69° 11′ 57″ | |
| 1744 | | Barred spiral galaxy | Lepus | 04^{h} 59^{m} 57.6^{s} | −26° 01′ 22″ | 11.1 |
| 1745 | (Located in Large Magellanic Cloud) | Open cluster | Dorado | 04^{h} 54^{m} 20.7^{s} | −69° 09′ 32″ | |
| 1746 | | Open cluster | Taurus | 05^{h} 03^{m} 50.0^{s} | +23° 46′ 12″ | 6.1 |
| 1747 | (Located in Large Magellanic Cloud) | Open cluster | Dorado | 04^{h} 55^{m} 11.0^{s} | −67° 10′ 08″ | 9.4 |
| 1748 | (Located in Large Magellanic Cloud) | Emission nebula | Dorado | 04^{h} 54^{m} 23.7^{s} | −69° 11′ 06″ | |
| 1749 | (Located in Large Magellanic Cloud) | Open cluster | Dorado | 04^{h} 54^{m} 56.1^{s} | −68° 11′ 20″ | 13.6 |
| 1750 | | Open cluster | Taurus | 05^{h} 03^{m} 54.0^{s} | +23° 39′ 30″ | |
| 1751 | (Located in Large Magellanic Cloud) | Open cluster | Dorado | 04^{h} 54^{m} 12.1^{s} | −69° 48′ 23″ | 14.5 |
| 1752 | | Barred spiral galaxy | Eridanus | 05^{h} 02^{m} 09.6^{s} | −08° 14′ 27″ | 12.4 |
| 1753 | | Spiral galaxy | Orion | 05^{h} 02^{m} 32.2^{s} | −03° 20′ 41″ | 14.5 |
| 1754 | | Open cluster | Mensa | 04^{h} 54^{m} 17.9^{s} | −70° 26′ 30″ | 12.0 |
| 1755 | (Located in Large Magellanic Cloud) | Open cluster | Dorado | 04^{h} 56^{m} 51.5^{s} | −66° 24′ 25″ | 9.9 |
| 1756 | (Located in Large Magellanic Cloud) | Globular cluster | Dorado | 04^{h} 54^{m} 49.9^{s} | −69° 14′ 15″ | 12.2 |
| 1757 | Doesn't exist | Unknown | Eridanus | 05^{h} 02^{m} 39.3^{s} | −04° 43′ 23″ | |
| 1758 | | Open cluster | Taurus | 05^{h} 04^{m} 36.0^{s} | +23° 47′ 54″ | |
| 1759 | | Elliptical galaxy | Caelum | 05^{h} 00^{m} 49.0^{s} | −38° 40′ 25″ | 12.8 |
| 1760 | (Located in Large Magellanic Cloud) | Emission nebula | Dorado | 04^{h} 56^{m} 36.0^{s} | −66° 31′ 24″ | |
| 1761 | (Located in Large Magellanic Cloud) | Open cluster | Dorado | 04^{h} 56^{m} 42.0^{s} | −66° 28′ 45″ | 9.9 |
| 1762 | | Spiral galaxy | Orion | 05^{h} 03^{m} 37.0^{s} | +01° 34′ 24″ | 12.6 |
| 1763 | (Located in Large Magellanic Cloud) | Emission nebula | Dorado | 04^{h} 55^{m} 14.0^{s} | −68° 07′ 18″ | 9.9 |
| 1764 | | Open cluster | Dorado | 04^{h} 56^{m} 27.8^{s} | −67° 41′ 38″ | 12.6 |
| 1765 | | Barred lenticular galaxy | Dorado | 04^{h} 58^{m} 24.3^{s} | −62° 01′ 40″ | 13.0 |
| 1766 | (Located in Large Magellanic Cloud) | Open cluster | Mensa | 04^{h} 55^{m} 57.7^{s} | −70° 13′ 31″ | 12.2 |
| 1767 | | Open cluster | Dorado | 04^{h} 56^{m} 27.4^{s} | −69° 24′ 02″ | 10.6 |
| 1768 | (Located in Large Magellanic Cloud) | Open cluster | Dorado | 04^{h} 57^{m} 00.2^{s} | −68° 14′ 58″ | 12.8 |
| 1769 | (Located in Large Magellanic Cloud) | Emission nebula | Dorado | 04^{h} 57^{m} 44.7^{s} | −66° 27′ 49″ | |
| 1770 | | Star forming region | Dorado | 04^{h} 57^{m} 18.0^{s} | −68° 24′ 54″ | |
| 1771 | | Spiral galaxy | Dorado | 04^{h} 58^{m} 55.6^{s} | −63° 17′ 54″ | 13.4 |
| 1772 | (Located in Large Magellanic Cloud) | Open cluster | Dorado | 04^{h} 56^{m} 52.9^{s} | −69° 33′ 22″ | 11.0 |
| 1773 | | Emission nebula | Dorado | 04^{h} 58^{m} 12.0^{s} | −66° 21′ 57″ | |
| 1774 | (Located in Large Magellanic Cloud) | Open cluster | Dorado | 04^{h} 58^{m} 06.9^{s} | −67° 14′ 33″ | 10.8 |
| 1775 | (Located in Large Magellanic Cloud) | Open cluster | Mensa | 04^{h} 56^{m} 53.4^{s} | −70° 25′ 47″ | 12.6 |
| 1776 | (Located in Large Magellanic Cloud) | Open cluster | Dorado | 04^{h} 58^{m} 39.8^{s} | −66° 25′ 47″ | 13.0 |
| 1777 | (Located in Large Magellanic Cloud) | Open cluster | Mensa | 04^{h} 55^{m} 47.8^{s} | −74° 17′ 08″ | 12.8 |
| 1778 | | Open cluster | Auriga | 05^{h} 08^{m} 05.0^{s} | +37° 01′ 24″ | 7.7 |
| 1779 | | Barred spiral galaxy | Eridanus | 05^{h} 05^{m} 18.0^{s} | −09° 08′ 52″ | 12.1 |
| 1780 | | Barred lenticular galaxy | Lepus | 05^{h} 06^{m} 20.7^{s} | −19° 28′ 01″ | 13.7 |
| 1781 | | Barred lenticular galaxy | Lepus | 05^{h} 07^{m} 55.1^{s} | −18° 11′ 24″ | 12.6 |
| 1782 | (Located in Large Magellanic Cloud) | Open cluster | Dorado | 04^{h} 57^{m} 51.2^{s} | −69° 23′ 32″ | 10.5 |
| 1783 | (Located in Large Magellanic Cloud) | Globular cluster | Dorado | 04^{h} 59^{m} 08.8^{s} | −65° 59′ 07″ | 10.9 |
| 1784 | | Spiral galaxy | Lepus | 05^{h} 05^{m} 26.7^{s} | −11° 52′ 21″ | 12 |
| 1785 | (Superposed on Large Magellanic Cloud) | Asterism | Dorado | 04^{h} 58^{m} 35.3^{s} | −68° 50′ 37″ | |
| 1786 | (Located in Large Magellanic Cloud) | Globular cluster | Dorado | 04^{h} 59^{m} 07.9^{s} | −67° 44′ 43″ | 10.9 |
| 1787 | (Located in Large Magellanic Cloud) | Open cluster | Dorado | 05^{h} 00^{m} 02.0^{s} | −65° 47′ 42″ | 10.9 |
| 1788 | | Diffuse nebula | Orion | 05^{h} 06^{m} 54^{s} | −03° 21′ | 5.8 |
| 1789 | (Located in Large Magellanic Cloud) | Open cluster | Mensa | 04^{h} 57^{m} 51.2^{s} | −71° 54′ 03″ | 13.1 |
| 1790 | | Open cluster | Auriga | 05^{h} 11^{m} 07.2^{s} | +52° 03′ 30″ | |
| 1791 | (Located in Large Magellanic Cloud) | Open cluster | Mensa | 04^{h} 59^{m} 06.6^{s} | −70° 10′ 08″ | 13.1 |
| 1792 | | Barred spiral galaxy | Columba | 05^{h} 05^{m} 13.8^{s} | −37° 58′ 47″ | 10.2 |
| 1793 | (Located in Large Magellanic Cloud) | Open cluster | Dorado | 04^{h} 59^{m} 38.3^{s} | −69° 33′ 28″ | 12.4 |
| 1794 | Duplicate of NGC 1781 | Barred spiral galaxy | Lepus | 05^{h} 07^{m} 55.1^{s} | −18° 11′ 24″ | 12.6 |
| 1795 | (Located in Large Magellanic Cloud) | Globular cluster | Dorado | 04^{h} 59^{m} 47.0^{s} | −69° 48′ 05″ | 12.4 |
| 1796 | | Barred spiral galaxy | Dorado | 05^{h} 02^{m} 42.8^{s} | −61° 08′ 23″ | 12.3 |
| 1797 | | Spiral galaxy | Eridanus | 05^{h} 07^{m} 44.9^{s} | −08° 01′ 08″ | 13.5 |
| 1798 | | Open cluster | Auriga | 05^{h} 11^{m} 39.3^{s} | +47° 41′ 44″ | 10.0 |
| 1799 | | Barred lenticular galaxy | Eridanus | 05^{h} 07^{m} 44.5^{s} | −07° 58′ 08″ | 13.7 |
| 1800 | | Irregular galaxy | Columba | 05^{h} 06^{m} 25.4^{s} | −31° 57′ 16″ | 12.6 |

== 1801–1900 ==
| NGC number | Other names | Object type | Constellation | Right ascension (J2000) | Declination (J2000) | Apparent magnitude |
|---|---|---|---|---|---|---|
| 1801 | (Located in Large Magellanic Cloud) | Open cluster | Dorado | 05^{h} 00^{m} 34.6^{s} | −69° 36′ 50″ | 12.2 |
| 1802 | | Open cluster | Taurus | 05^{h} 10^{m} 14.0^{s} | +24° 07′ 30″ | |
| 1803 | | Barred spiral galaxy | Pictor | 05^{h} 05^{m} 26.5^{s} | −49° 34′ 03″ | 12.9 |
| 1804 | (Located in Large Magellanic Cloud) | Open cluster | Dorado | 05^{h} 01^{m} 03.3^{s} | −69° 04′ 58″ | 11.9 |
| 1805 | (Located in Large Magellanic Cloud) | Globular cluster | Dorado | 05^{h} 02^{m} 21.4^{s} | −66° 06′ 44″ | 10.6 |
| 1806 | (Located in Large Magellanic Cloud) | Globular cluster | Dorado | 05^{h} 02^{m} 11.4^{s} | −67° 59′ 02″ | |
| 1807 | | Open cluster | Taurus | 05^{h} 10^{m} 46.0^{s} | +16° 30′ 48″ | 7.0 |
| 1808 | | Barred spiral galaxy | Columba | 05^{h} 07^{m} 42.3^{s} | −37° 30′ 46″ | 10.7 |
| 1809 | | Spiral galaxy | Dorado | 05^{h} 02^{m} 05.3^{s} | −69° 34′ 06″ | 12.1 |
| 1810 | (Located in Large Magellanic Cloud) | Open cluster | Dorado | 05^{h} 03^{m} 23.3^{s} | −66° 22′ 55″ | 11.9 |
| 1811 | | Spiral galaxy | Columba | 05^{h} 08^{m} 42.5^{s} | −29° 16′ 35″ | 13.6 |
| 1812 | | Spiral galaxy | Columba | 05^{h} 08^{m} 52.8^{s} | −29° 15′ 06″ | 12.6 |
| 1813 | (Located in Large Magellanic Cloud) | Open cluster | Mensa | 05^{h} 02^{m} 40.4^{s} | −70° 19′ 05″ | 12.8 |
| 1814 | (Located in Large Magellanic Cloud) | Open cluster | Dorado | 05^{h} 03^{m} 46.5^{s} | −67° 18′ 03″ | 9.0 |
| 1815 | (Located in Large Magellanic Cloud) | Open cluster | Mensa | 05^{h} 02^{m} 27.3^{s} | −70° 37′ 16″ | 12.4 |
| 1816 | (Located in Large Magellanic Cloud) | Open cluster | Dorado | 05^{h} 03^{m} 50.8^{s} | −67° 15′ 39″ | 9.0 |
| 1817 | | Open cluster | Taurus | 05^{h} 12^{m} 27.0^{s} | +16° 41′ 00″ | 7.7 |
| 1818 | (Located in Large Magellanic Cloud) | Globular cluster | Dorado | 05^{h} 04^{m} 14.8^{s} | −66° 26′ 04″ | 9.7 |
| 1819 | | Barred lenticular galaxy | Orion | 05^{h} 11^{m} 46.0^{s} | +05° 12′ 03″ | 12.5 |
| 1820 | (Located in Large Magellanic Cloud) | Open cluster | Dorado | 05^{h} 04^{m} 06.0^{s} | −67° 16′ 42″ | 9.0 |
| 1821 | | Irregular galaxy | Lepus | 05^{h} 11^{m} 46.0^{s} | −15° 08′ 04″ | 13.3 |
| 1822 | (Located in Large Magellanic Cloud) | Open cluster | Dorado | 05^{h} 05^{m} 09.2^{s} | −66° 12′ 38″ | 13.2 |
| 1823 | (Located in Large Magellanic Cloud) | Open cluster | Mensa | 05^{h} 03^{m} 25.0^{s} | −70° 20′ 08″ | 12.1 |
| 1824 | | Barred spiral galaxy | Dorado | 05^{h} 06^{m} 56.0^{s} | −59° 43′ 31″ | 12.6 |
| 1825 | (Located in Large Magellanic Cloud) | Open cluster | Dorado | 05^{h} 04^{m} 19.0^{s} | −68° 55′ 36″ | 12.0 |
| 1826 | (Located in Large Magellanic Cloud) | Open cluster | Dorado | 05^{h} 05^{m} 34.0^{s} | −66° 13′ 52″ | 13.3 |
| 1827 | | Barred spiral galaxy | Columba | 05^{h} 10^{m} 04.4^{s} | −36° 57′ 37″ | 12.6 |
| 1828 | (Located in Large Magellanic Cloud) | Open cluster | Dorado | 05^{h} 04^{m} 20.9^{s} | −69° 23′ 18″ | 12.5 |
| 1829 | | Open cluster | Dorado | 05^{h} 04^{m} 57.4^{s} | −68° 03′ 20″ | |
| 1830 | (Located in Large Magellanic Cloud) | Open cluster | Dorado | 05^{h} 04^{m} 38.3^{s} | −69° 20′ 25″ | 12.6 |
| 1831 | (Located in Large Magellanic Cloud) | Globular cluster | Dorado | 05^{h} 06^{m} 16.2^{s} | −64° 55′ 07″ | 11.2 |
| 1832 | | Barred spiral galaxy | Lepus | 05^{h} 12^{m} 03.0^{s} | −15° 41′ 20″ | 11.3 |
| 1833 | (Located in Large Magellanic Cloud) | Open cluster | Mensa | 05^{h} 04^{m} 21.8^{s} | −70° 43′ 54″ | |
| 1834 | (Located in Large Magellanic Cloud) | Open cluster | Dorado | 05^{h} 05^{m} 11.4^{s} | −69° 12′ 27″ | |
| 1835 | (Located in Large Magellanic Cloud) | Open cluster | Dorado | 05^{h} 05^{m} 05.7^{s} | −69° 24′ 15″ | 10.6 |
| 1836 | (Located in Large Magellanic Cloud) | Open cluster | Dorado | 05^{h} 05^{m} 34.5^{s} | −68° 37′ 41″ | 12.2 |
| 1837 | (Located in Large Magellanic Cloud) | Open cluster | Mensa | 05^{h} 04^{m} 55.9^{s} | −70° 42′ 51″ | 10.6 |
| 1838 | (Located in Large Magellanic Cloud) | Open cluster | Dorado | 05^{h} 06^{m} 47.0^{s} | −68° 25′ 24″ | 12.9 |
| 1839 | (Located in Large Magellanic Cloud) | Open cluster | Dorado | 05^{h} 06^{m} 02.4^{s} | −68° 37′ 37″ | 11.8 |
| 1840 | (Located in Large Magellanic Cloud) | Open cluster | Mensa | 05^{h} 05^{m} 19.2^{s} | −71° 45′ 47″ | |
| 1841 | (Located in Large Magellanic Cloud) | Globular cluster | Mensa | 04^{h} 45^{m} 23.1^{s} | −83° 59′ 49″ | 14.1 |
| 1842 | (Located in Large Magellanic Cloud) | Open cluster | Dorado | 05^{h} 07^{m} 18.2^{s} | −67° 16′ 24″ | 14.0 |
| 1843 | | Spiral galaxy | Orion | 05^{h} 14^{m} 06.1^{s} | −10° 37′ 36″ | 12.7 |
| 1844 | (Located in Large Magellanic Cloud) | Open cluster | Dorado | 05^{h} 07^{m} 30.7^{s} | −67° 19′ 25″ | 12.1 |
| 1845 | (Superposed on Large Magellanic Cloud) | Open cluster | Mensa | 05^{h} 05^{m} 45.0^{s} | −70° 34′ 54″ | 10.2 |
| 1846 | (Located in Large Magellanic Cloud) | Open cluster | Dorado | 05^{h} 07^{m} 34.7^{s} | −67° 27′ 31″ | 11.3 |
| 1847 | (Located in Large Magellanic Cloud) | Open cluster | Dorado | 05^{h} 07^{m} 08.2^{s} | −68° 58′ 17″ | 11.1 |
| 1848 | (Located in Large Magellanic Cloud) | Open cluster | Mensa | 05^{h} 07^{m} 27.2^{s} | −71° 11′ 44″ | 9.7 |
| 1849 | (Located in Large Magellanic Cloud) | Open cluster | Dorado | 05^{h} 09^{m} 34.9^{s} | −66° 18′ 57″ | 12.8 |
| 1850 | (Located in Large Magellanic Cloud) | Open cluster | Dorado | 05^{h} 08^{m} 45.8^{s} | −68° 45′ 39″ | 8.8 |
| 1851 | | Globular cluster | Columba | 05^{h} 14^{m} 06.3^{s} | −40° 02′ 50″ | 8.8 |
| 1852 | (Located in Large Magellanic Cloud) | Open cluster | Dorado | 05^{h} 09^{m} 24.0^{s} | −67° 46′ 39″ | 12.0 |
| 1853 | | Barred spiral galaxy | Dorado | 05^{h} 12^{m} 16.0^{s} | −57° 23′ 58″ | 13.0 |
| 1854 | (Located in Large Magellanic Cloud) | Globular cluster | Dorado | 05^{h} 09^{m} 20.0^{s} | −68° 50′ 51″ | 10.4 |
| 1855 | (Located in Large Magellanic Cloud) | Globular cluster | Dorado | 05^{h} 09^{m} 20.0^{s} | −68° 50′ 51″ | 10.4 |
| 1856 | (Located in Large Magellanic Cloud) | Open cluster | Dorado | 05^{h} 09^{m} 29.4^{s} | −69° 07′ 40″ | 10.1 |
| 1857 | | Open cluster | Auriga | 05^{h} 20^{m} | +39° 21′ | 8.1 |
| 1858 | (Located in Large Magellanic Cloud) | Open cluster | Dorado | 05^{h} 09^{m} 55.0^{s} | −68° 53′ 54″ | 9.9 |
| 1859 | (Located in Large Magellanic Cloud) | Open cluster | Dorado | 05^{h} 11^{m} 31.8^{s} | −65° 14′ 59″ | 12.3 |
| 1860 | (Located in Large Magellanic Cloud) | Open cluster | Dorado | 05^{h} 10^{m} 39.6^{s} | −68° 45′ 08″ | 11.0 |
| 1861 | (Located in Large Magellanic Cloud) | Open cluster | Mensa | 05^{h} 10^{m} 22.2^{s} | −70° 46′ 38″ | 13.2 |
| 1862 | (Located in Large Magellanic Cloud) | Open cluster | Dorado | 05^{h} 12^{m} 34.6^{s} | −66° 09′ 16″ | 13.3 |
| 1863 | (Located in Large Magellanic Cloud) | Open cluster | Dorado | 05^{h} 11^{m} 39.6^{s} | −68° 43′ 37″ | 11.0 |
| 1864 | (Located in Large Magellanic Cloud) | Open cluster | Dorado | 05^{h} 12^{m} 40.7^{s} | −67° 37′ 17″ | 12.9 |
| 1865 | (Located in Large Magellanic Cloud) | Open cluster | Dorado | 05^{h} 12^{m} 25.1^{s} | −68° 46′ 16″ | 12.9 |
| 1866 | (Located in Large Magellanic Cloud) | Globular cluster | Dorado | 05^{h} 13^{m} 39.1^{s} | −65° 27′ 56″ | 9.7 |
| 1867 | (Located in Large Magellanic Cloud) | Open cluster | Dorado | 05^{h} 13^{m} 42.5^{s} | −66° 17′ 39″ | 13.4 |
| 1868 | (Located in Large Magellanic Cloud) | Globular cluster | Dorado | 05^{h} 14^{m} 36.5^{s} | −63° 57′ 18″ | 11.6 |
| 1869 | (Located in Large Magellanic Cloud) | Open cluster | Dorado | 05^{h} 13^{m} 56.3^{s} | −67° 22′ 46″ | 14.0 |
| 1870 | (Located in Large Magellanic Cloud) | Open cluster | Dorado | 05^{h} 13^{m} 10.0^{s} | −69° 07′ 01″ | 11.3 |
| 1871 | | Open cluster | Dorado | 05^{h} 13^{m} 51.8^{s} | −67° 27′ 10″ | 10.1 |
| 1872 | (Located in Large Magellanic Cloud) | Open cluster | Dorado | 05^{h} 13^{m} 11.7^{s} | −69° 18′ 45″ | 11.4 |
| 1873 | (Located in Large Magellanic Cloud) | Open cluster | Dorado | 05^{h} 13^{m} 55.7^{s} | −67° 20′ 04″ | 10.4 |
| 1874 | (Located in Large Magellanic Cloud) | Nebula | Dorado | 05^{h} 13^{m} 11.7^{s} | −69° 22′ 35″ | |
| 1875 | | Interacting galaxies | Orion | 05^{h} 21^{m} 45.7^{s} | +06° 41′ 20″ | 13.7 |
| 1876 | (Located in Large Magellanic Cloud) | Open cluster | Dorado | 05^{h} 13^{m} 18.5^{s} | −69° 21′ 52″ | 11.7 |
| 1877 | (Located in Large Magellanic Cloud) | Open cluster | Dorado | 05^{h} 13^{m} 39.0^{s} | −69° 23′ 00″ | |
| 1878 | (Located in Large Magellanic Cloud) | Open cluster | Mensa | 05^{h} 12^{m} 51.0^{s} | −70° 28′ 18″ | 12.9 |
| 1879 | | Barred spiral galaxy | Columba | 05^{h} 19^{m} 48.1^{s} | −32° 08′ 33″ | 12.8 |
| 1880 | (Located in Large Magellanic Cloud) | Emission nebula | Dorado | 05^{h} 13^{m} 39.2^{s} | −69° 22′ 52″ | |
| 1881 | (Located in Large Magellanic Cloud) | Open cluster | Dorado | 05^{h} 13^{m} 36.0^{s} | −69° 17′ 54″ | |
| 1882 | (Located in Large Magellanic Cloud) | Open cluster | Dorado | 05^{h} 15^{m} 33.4^{s} | −66° 07′ 47″ | 12.3 |
| 1883 | | Open cluster | Auriga | 05^{h} 25^{m} 54.1^{s} | +46° 29′ 25″ | 12.0 |
| 1884 | Doesn't exist | Unknown | Dorado | 05^{h} 15^{m} 58.0^{s} | −66° 09′ 48″ | |
| 1885 | (Located in Large Magellanic Cloud) | Open cluster | Dorado | 05^{h} 15^{m} 05.9^{s} | −68° 58′ 40″ | 12.0 |
| 1886 | | Galaxy | Lepus | 05^{h} 21^{m} 48.2^{s} | −23° 48′ 36″ | 12.7 |
| 1887 | (Located in Large Magellanic Cloud) | Open cluster | Dorado | 05^{h} 16^{m} 06.0^{s} | −66° 19′ 07″ | 12.7 |
| 1888 | | Barred spiral galaxy | Lepus | 05^{h} 22^{m} 34.4^{s} | −11° 30′ 01″ | 11.9 |
| 1889 | | Elliptical galaxy | Lepus | 05^{h} 22^{m} 35.3^{s} | −11° 29′ 49″ | 13.1 |
| 1890 | (Located in Large Magellanic Cloud) | Open cluster | Mensa | 05^{h} 13^{m} 45.9^{s} | −72° 04′ 41″ | 12.8 |
| 1891 | | Open cluster | Columba | 05^{h} 21^{m} 44.0^{s} | −35° 47′ 24″ | |
| 1892 | | Spiral galaxy | Dorado | 05^{h} 17^{m} 09.5^{s} | −64° 57′ 37″ | 12.2 |
| 1893 | | Open cluster | Auriga | 05h 22m 44s | +33° 24′ 42″ | 14.38 |
| 1894 | (Located in Large Magellanic Cloud) | Open cluster | Dorado | 05^{h} 15^{m} 51.3^{s} | −69° 28′ 07″ | 12.2 |
| 1895 | (Located in Large Magellanic Cloud) | Emission nebula | Dorado | 05^{h} 16^{m} 52.4^{s} | −67° 19′ 47″ | |
| 1896 | | Open cluster | Auriga | 05^{h} 25^{m} 41.9^{s} | +29° 19′ 42″ | |
| 1897 | (Located in Large Magellanic Cloud) | Open cluster | Dorado | 05^{h} 17^{m} 32.4^{s} | −67° 26′ 56″ | 13.5 |
| 1898 | (Located in Large Magellanic Cloud) | Open cluster | Dorado | 05^{h} 16^{m} 42.4^{s} | −69° 39′ 23″ | 11.9 |
| 1899 | (Located in Large Magellanic Cloud) | Emission nebula | Dorado | 05^{h} 17^{m} 46.0^{s} | −67° 54′ 00″ | |
| 1900 | (Located in Large Magellanic Cloud) | Open cluster | Dorado | 05^{h} 19^{m} 09.4^{s} | −63° 01′ 25″ | 13.6 |

== 1901–2000 ==
| NGC number | Other names | Object type | Constellation | Right ascension (J2000) | Declination (J2000) | Apparent magnitude |
|---|---|---|---|---|---|---|
| 1901 | | Open cluster | Dorado | 05^{h} 18^{m} 11.0^{s} | −68° 27′ 00″ | |
| 1902 | (Located in Large Magellanic Cloud) | Open cluster | Dorado | 05^{h} 18^{m} 18.6^{s} | −66° 37′ 39″ | 11.77 |
| 1903 | (Located in Large Magellanic Cloud) | Open cluster | Dorado | 05^{h} 17^{m} 22.7^{s} | −69° 20′ 08″ | 11.86 |
| 1904 | Messier 79 | Globular cluster | Lepus | 05^{h} 24^{m} 10.6^{s} | −24° 31′ 27″ | 9.2 |
| 1905 | (Located in Large Magellanic Cloud) | Open cluster | Dorado | 05^{h} 18^{m} 22.7^{s} | −67° 16′ 39″ | 13.21 |
| 1906 | | Galaxy | Lepus | 05^{h} 24^{m} 47.1^{s} | −15° 56′ 36″ | |
| 1907 | | Open cluster | Auriga | 05^{h} 28^{m} 06^{s} | +35° 20′ | 8.9 |
| 1908 | Doesn't exist | Unknown | Orion | 05^{h} 25^{m} 53.8^{s} | −02° 31′ 44″ | |
| 1909 | IC 2118 | Reflection nebula | Eridanus | 05^{h} 02^{m} | −07.9° | 13 |
| 1910 | (Located in Large Magellanic Cloud) | Open cluster | Dorado | 05^{h} 18^{m} 42.5^{s} | −69° 14′ 12″ | 9.65 |
| 1911 | | Open cluster | Dorado | 05^{h} 19^{m} 25.7^{s} | −66° 40′ 59″ | |
| 1912 | Messier 38 | Open cluster | Auriga | 05^{h} 28^{m} 43^{s} | +35° 51′ | 6.7 |
| 1913 | (Located in Large Magellanic Cloud) | Open cluster | Dorado | 05^{h} 18^{m} 18.7^{s} | −69° 32′ 15″ | 11.14 |
| 1914 | (Located in Large Magellanic Cloud) | Open cluster | Mensa | 05^{h} 17^{m} 37^{s} | −71° 15.0′ | 12.01 |
| 1915 (Note: According to NED, NGC 1915 may also be named NGC 1919.) | (Located in Large Magellanic Cloud) | Open cluster | Dorado | 05^{h} 19^{m} 27.3^{s} | −66° 44′ 24″ | 11.14 |
| 1916 | (Located in Large Magellanic Cloud) | Open cluster | Dorado | 05^{h} 18^{m} 37.9^{s} | −69° 24′ 23″ | 10.38 |
| 1917 | (Located in Large Magellanic Cloud) | Open cluster | Dorado | 05^{h} 19^{m} 03.4^{s} | −69° 00′ 06″ | 12.33 |
| 1918 | (Located in Large Magellanic Cloud) | Supernova remnant | Dorado | 05^{h} 19^{m} 04.5^{s} | −69° 38′ 56″ | |
| 1919 | (Located in Large Magellanic Cloud) | Nebula (Note: SIMBAD lists this as a cluster of stars.) | Dorado | 05^{h} 20^{m} 09^{s} | −66° 52.4′ | |
| 1920 (Note: According to NED, NGC 1920 may also be NGC 1911.) | (Located in Large Magellanic Cloud) | Open cluster | Dorado | 05^{h} 20^{m} 33^{s} | −66° 46.7′ | 12.54 |
| 1921 | | Open cluster (Note: SIMBAD lists this as an "object of unknown nature".) | Dorado | 05^{h} 20^{m} 33^{s} | −66° 46.7′ | 12.54 |
| 1922 | (Located in Large Magellanic Cloud) | Open cluster | Dorado | 05^{h} 19^{m} 50.0^{s} | −69° 30′ 04″ | 11.51 |
| 1923 | | Open cluster | Dorado | 05^{h} 21^{m} 33^{s} | −65° 29.3′ | 11.24 |
| 1924 | | Barred spiral galaxy | Orion | 05^{h} 28^{m} 02.0^{s} | −05° 18′ 38″ | 13.25 |
| 1925 | (Located in Large Magellanic Cloud) | Open cluster (Note: SIMBAD lists this as a stellar association.) | Dorado | 05^{h} 21^{m} 42^{s} | −65° 50.4′ | |
| 1926 | (Located in Large Magellanic Cloud) | Open cluster | Dorado | 05^{h} 20^{m} 35.4^{s} | −69° 31′ 31″ | 11.79 |
| 1927 | Doesn't exist | Unknown | Eridanus | 05^{h} 28^{m} 43.0^{s} | −08° 22′ 38″ | |
| 1928 | (Located in Large Magellanic Cloud) | Open cluster | Dorado | 05^{h} 20^{m} 55.9^{s} | −69° 28′ 35″ | 12.47 |
| 1929 | (Located in Large Magellanic Cloud) | Open cluster | Dorado | 05^{h} 21^{m} 46.8^{s} | −67° 53′ 42″ | 14.0 |
| 1930 | | Lenticular galaxy | Pictor | 05^{h} 25^{m} 56.8^{s} | −46° 43′ 42″ | |
| 1931 | | Open cluster | Auriga | 05^{h} 31^{m} 26.6^{s} | +34° 14′ 58″ | 10.1 |
| 1932 | (Superposed on Large Magellanic Cloud) | Lenticular galaxy | Dorado | 05^{h} 22^{m} 27.2^{s} | −66° 09′ 06″ | 11.84 |
| 1933 | (Located in Large Magellanic Cloud) | Open cluster (Note: SIMBAD lists this as the star GSC 08890-00548.) | Dorado | 05^{h} 22^{m} 27.3^{s} | −66° 09′ 08″ | |
| 1934 | (Located in Large Magellanic Cloud) | Open cluster (Note: SIMBAD lists this as "interstellar matter".) | Dorado | 05^{h} 21^{m} 50^{s} | −67° 54.2′ | 10.50 |
| 1935 | (Located in Large Magellanic Cloud) | Stellar association | Dorado | 05^{h} 21^{m} 58^{s} | −67° 57.3′ | |
| 1936 | IC 2127 (Located in Large Magellanic Cloud) | Emission nebula | Dorado | 05^{h} 22^{m} 12.5^{s} | −67° 58′ 32″ | 11.60 |
| 1937 | (Located in Large Magellanic Cloud) | Stellar association | Dorado | 05^{h} 22^{m} 29.0^{s} | −67° 53′ 42″ | |
| 1938 | (Located in Large Magellanic Cloud) | Open cluster | Mensa | 05^{h} 21^{m} 24.3^{s} | −69° 56′ 32″ | 13.09 |
| 1939 | (Located in Large Magellanic Cloud) | Open cluster | Mensa | 05^{h} 21^{m} 26.8^{s} | −69° 56′ 59″ | 11.83 |
| 1940 | (Located in Large Magellanic Cloud) | Open cluster | Dorado | 05^{h} 22^{m} 44.3^{s} | −67° 11′ 11″ | 11.91 |
| 1941 | (Located in Large Magellanic Cloud) | Open cluster | Dorado | 05^{h} 23^{m} 07.9^{s} | −66° 22′ 45″ | 12.00 |
| 1942 | (Located in Large Magellanic Cloud) | Open cluster | Dorado | 05^{h} 24^{m} 43^{s} | −63° 56′ 24″ | 13.46 |
| 1943 | (Located in Large Magellanic Cloud) | Open cluster | Mensa | 05^{h} 22^{m} 30.3^{s} | −70° 09′ 19″ | 11.88 |
| 1944 | (Located in Large Magellanic Cloud) | Open cluster | Mensa | 05^{h} 21^{m} 57.5^{s} | −72° 29′ 39″ | 11.84 |
| 1945 | (Located in Large Magellanic Cloud) | Emission nebula | Dorado | 05^{h} 25^{m} 01.0^{s} | −66° 25′ 24″ | |
| 1946 | | Open cluster | Dorado | 05^{h} 25^{m} 15^{s} | −66° 24′ | 12.7 |
| 1947 | | Lenticular galaxy | Dorado | 05^{h} 26^{m} 47.6^{s} | −63° 45′ 36″ | 10.8 |
| 1948 | | Association of stars | Dorado | 05^{h} 24^{m} 20.0^{s} | −66° 24′ 12″ | 10.8 |
| 1949 | (Within boundaries of Large Magellanic Cloud) | Open cluster | Dorado | 05^{h} 24^{m} 58.2^{s} | −68° 28′ 41″ | 12.39 |
| 1950 | (Located in Large Magellanic Cloud) | Open cluster | Mensa | 05^{h} 24^{m} 33.0^{s} | −69° 54′ 04″ | 13.17 |
| 1951 | (Located in Large Magellanic Cloud) | Open cluster | Dorado | 05^{h} 26^{m} 05.4^{s} | −66° 35′ 52″ | 10.58 |
| 1952 | Messier 1; Crab Nebula | Supernova remnant | Taurus | 05^{h} 34^{m} 32.0^{s} | +22° 00′ 52″ | 8.4 |
| 1953 | (Located in Large Magellanic Cloud) | Open cluster | Dorado | 05^{h} 25^{m} 27^{s} | −68° 50′ 18″ | 11.74 |
| 1954 | | Spiral galaxy | Lepus | 05^{h} 32^{m} 48.4^{s} | −14° 03′ 46″ | 11.8 |
| 1955 | (Located in Large Magellanic Cloud) | Diffuse nebula | Mensa | 05^{h} 26^{m} 12^{s} | −67° 29′ 54″ | 8.87 |
| 1956 | | Spiral galaxy | Mensa | 05^{h} 19^{m} 35.3^{s} | −77° 43′ 43″ | 13.1 |
| 1957 | | Galaxy | Lepus | 05^{h} 32^{m} 55.2^{s} | −14° 07′ 59″ | 13.9 |
| 1958 | (Located in Large Magellanic Cloud) | Open cluster | Dorado | 05^{h} 25^{m} 31^{s} | −69° 50′ 13″ | 12.99 |
| 1959 | (Located in Large Magellanic Cloud) | Open cluster | Mensa | 05^{h} 25^{m} 36^{s} | −69° 55′ 36″ | 12.17 |
| 1960 | Messier 36 | Open cluster | Auriga | 05^{h} 36^{m} 12^{s} | +34° 08′ | 6.1 |
| 1961 | | Spiral galaxy | Camelopardalis | 05^{h} 42^{m} 05.4^{s} | +69° 22′ 42″ | 12.2 |
| 1962 | | Open cluster | Dorado | 05^{h} 27^{m} 00^{s} | −68° 51′ 00″ | |
| 1963 | | Open cluster | Columba | 05^{h} 32^{m} 17^{s} | −36° 23′ 30″ | |
| 1964 | | Spiral galaxy | Lepus | 05^{h} 33^{m} 21.7^{s} | −21° 56′ 45″ | 11.45 |
| 1965 | (Located in Large Magellanic Cloud) | Open cluster | Dorado | 05^{h} 26^{m} 29^{s} | −68° 48′ 24″ | 11.70 |
| 1966 | (Located in Large Magellanic Cloud) | Open cluster | Dorado | 05^{h} 26^{m} 30.4^{s} | −68° 49′ 02″ | 11.83 |
| 1967 | (Located in Large Magellanic Cloud) | Open cluster | Dorado | 05^{h} 26^{m} 43^{s} | −69° 06′ 06″ | 10.81 |
| 1968 | (Located in Large Magellanic Cloud) | Open cluster | Dorado | 05^{h} 27^{m} 23^{s} | −69° 28′ 18″ | 8.22 |
| 1969 | (Located in Large Magellanic Cloud) | Open cluster | Dorado | 05^{h} 26^{m} 34.1^{s} | −69° 50′ 27″ | 12.46 |
| 1970 | (Located in Large Magellanic Cloud) | Open cluster | Dorado | 05^{h} 26^{m} 49^{s} | −69° 49′ 42″ | 10.28 |
| 1971 | (Located in Large Magellanic Cloud) | Open cluster | Dorado | 05^{h} 26^{m} 45.6^{s} | −69° 51′ 03″ | 11.90 |
| 1972 | (Located in Large Magellanic Cloud) | Open cluster | Dorado | 05^{h} 26^{m} 48.8^{s} | −69° 50′ 17″ | 12.62 |
| 1973 | | Diffuse nebula | Orion | 05^{h} 35^{m} | −04° 44′ | 7 |
| 1974 | | Open cluster | Dorado | 05^{h} 27^{m} 59.0^{s} | −67° 25′ 27″ | 10.3 |
| 1975 | | Nebula | Orion | 05^{h} 35^{m} | −05° 23′ | 7 |
| 1976 | Messier 42; Orion Nebula | Diffuse nebula | Orion | 05^{h} 35^{m} 17.3^{s} | −05° 23′ 28″ | 5 |
| 1977 | | Open cluster | Orion | 05^{h} 35^{m} 15.0^{s} | −04° 53′ 12″ | 7 |
| 1978 | | Globular cluster | Dorado | 05^{h} 28^{m} 45.0^{s} | −66° 14′ 14″ | 10.7 |
| 1979 | | Lenticular galaxy | Lepus | 05^{h} 34^{m} 01.1^{s} | −23° 18′ 36″ | 12.84 |
| 1980 | | Open cluster | Orion | 05^{h} 35^{m} | −05° 55′ | 2.5 |
| 1981 | | Open cluster | Orion | 05^{h} 35^{m} | −04° 24′ | 4.2 |
| 1982 | Messier 43; de Mairan's Nebula | Diffuse nebula | Orion | 05^{h} 35^{m} 31^{s} | −05° 16′ | 9 |
| 1983 | (Located in Large Magellanic Cloud) | Open cluster | Dorado | 05^{h} 27^{m} 44^{s} | −68° 59′ 06″ | 9.9 |
| 1984 | (Within boundaries of Large Magellanic Cloud) | Open cluster | Dorado | 05^{h} 27^{m} 40^{s} | −69° 08′ 06″ | 9.99 |
| 1985 | | Reflection nebula | Auriga | 05^{h} 37^{m} 47.8^{s} | +31° 59′ 24″ | |
| 1986 | | Open cluster | Mensa | 05^{h} 27^{m} 37.7^{s} | −69° 58′ 14″ | 11.3 |
| 1987 | (Located in Large Magellanic Cloud) | Open cluster | Mensa | 05^{h} 27^{m} 17.1^{s} | −70° 44′ 14″ | 12.0 |
| 1988 | | Star | Taurus | 05^{h} 38^{m} | +21° 14′ | |
| 1989 | | Lenticular galaxy | Caelum | 05^{h} 34^{m} 23.4^{s} | −30° 48′ 04″ | 14.10 |
| 1990 | Epsilon Orionis Nebula | Reflection nebula | Orion | 05^{h} 36^{m} 12.8^{s} | −01° 12′ 07″ | |
| 1991 | (Within boundaries of Large Magellanic Cloud) | Open cluster | Dorado | 05^{h} 27^{m} 59.0^{s} | −67° 25′ 27″ | 10.30 |
| 1992 | | Spiral galaxy | Columba | 05^{h} 34^{m} 32.0^{s} | −30° 53′ 46″ | 14.65 |
| 1993 | | Lenticular galaxy | Lepus | 05^{h} 35^{m} 25.6^{s} | −17° 48′ 55″ | 13.39 |
| 1994 | (Within boundaries of Large Magellanic Cloud) | Open cluster | Dorado | 05^{h} 28^{m} 21.8^{s} | −69° 08′ 31″ | 9.8 |
| 1995 | | Double star | Pictor | 05^{h} 33^{m} 03.3^{s} | −48° 40′ 30″ | |
| 1996 | | Open cluster | Taurus | 05^{h} 38^{m} | +25° 46′ | |
| 1997 | | Open cluster | Dorado | 05^{h} 30^{m} 34^{s} | −63° 12.2′ 14.3″ | 13.43 |
| 1998 | | Lenticular galaxy | Pictor | 05^{h} 33^{m} 15.2^{s} | −48° 41′ 42″ | 14.3 |
| 1999 | | Diffuse nebula | Orion | 05^{h} 36^{m} 27^{s} | −06° 43′ | 9.5 |
| 2000 | | Open cluster | Mensa | 05^{h} 27^{m} 30^{s} | −71° 53′ | 12.3 |

== See also ==
- Lists of astronomical objects
