= NGC 2006 =

Association of stars located in the constellation Dorado

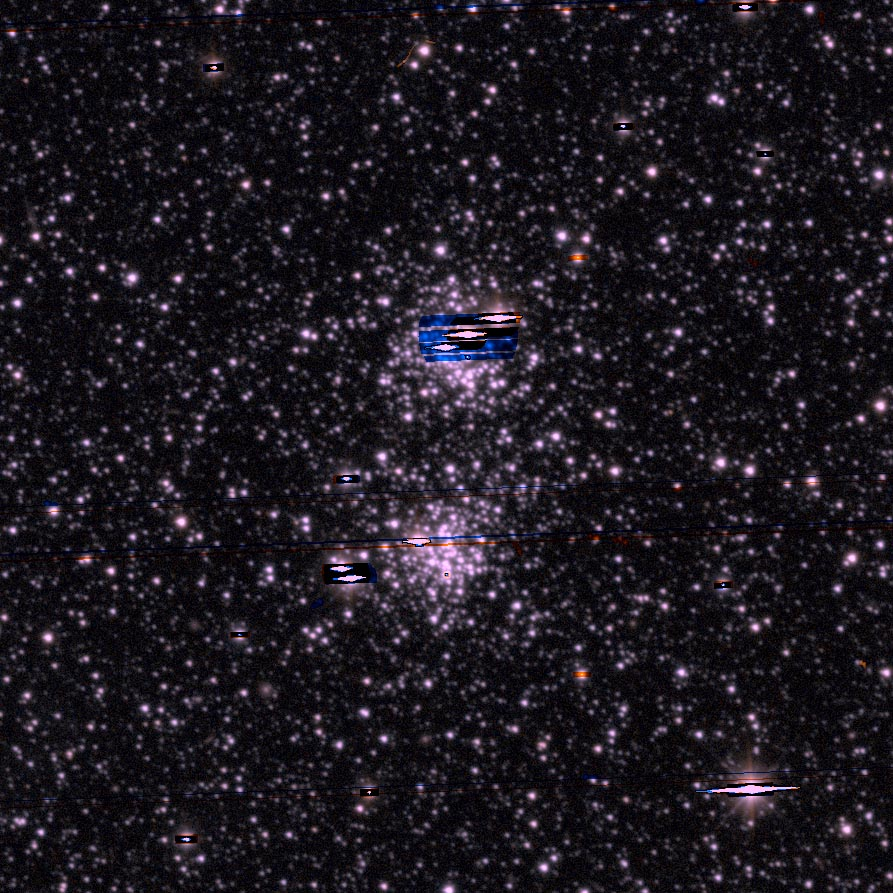
- The association of stars NGC 2006

Observation data (J2000 epoch)
- Right ascension: 05^{h} 31^{m} 19^{s}
- Declination: −66° 56′ 51″
- Apparent magnitude (V): 10.88

Physical characteristics

Associations
- Constellation: Dorado

NGC 2006 (also known as ESO 086-008 + ESO 086-007) comprises two small open clusters which form a small association of stars located in the constellation Dorado. Discovered by British astronomer John Herschel on December 23, 1834, it has a visual magnitude of 10.88 and is visible with a telescope having an aperture of 6 inches (150mm) or more. It is located in the Large Magellanic Cloud. The southern cluster is estimated to be about 50 light years across whilst the northern cluster is about 40 light years across with the entire object spanning between 90 and 95 light years.

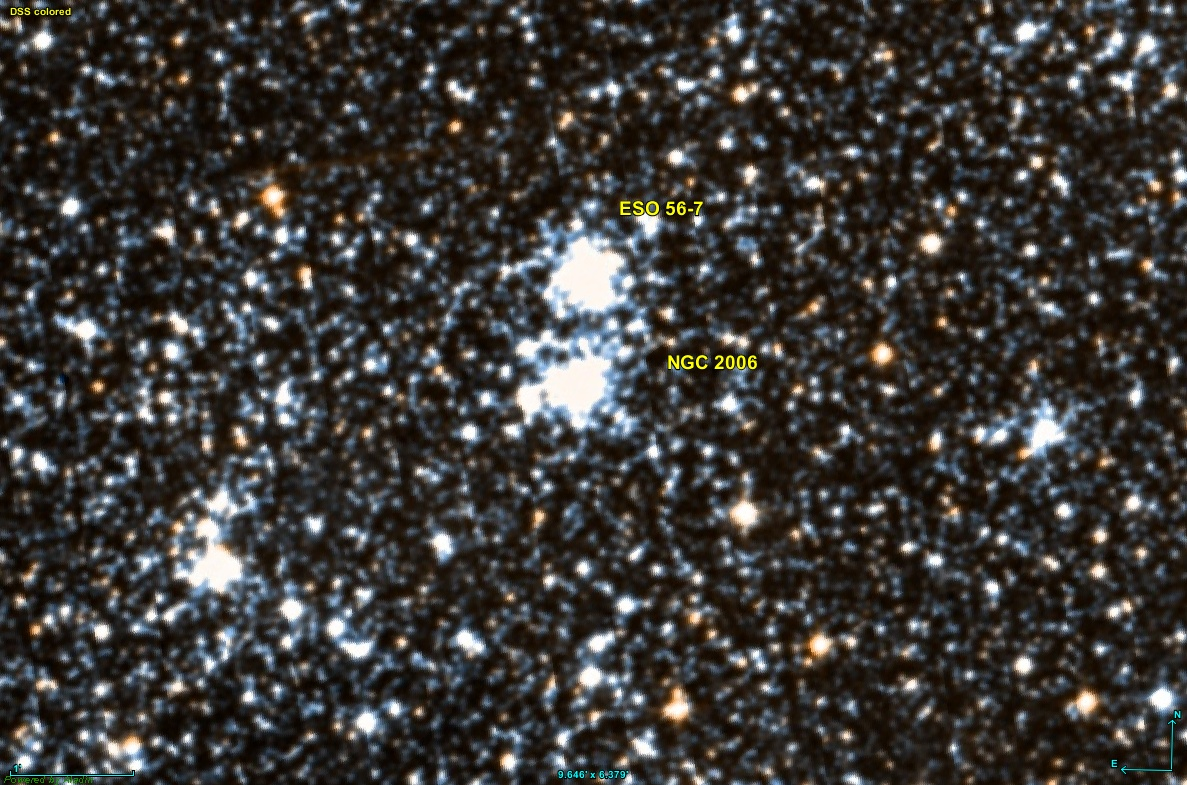
NGC 2006
