= NGC 2257 =

Globular cluster in the constellation Dorado

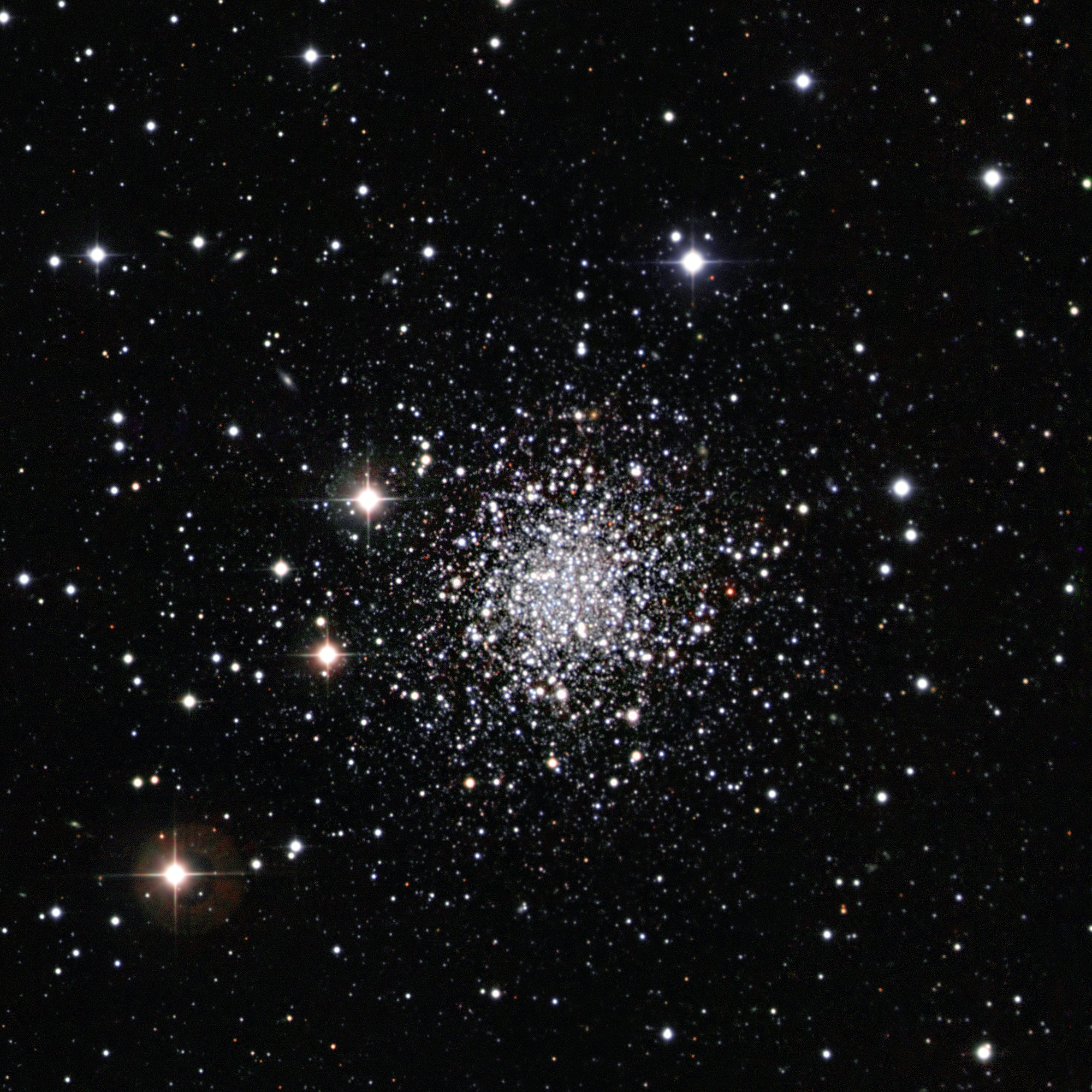
- NGC 2257 image made by the Wide Field Imager instrument on the 2.2-metre MPG/ESO telescope at La Silla

Observation data (J2000 epoch)
- Constellation: Dorado
- Right ascension: 06^{h} 30^{m} 12.62^{s}
- Declination: −64° 19′ 40.0″
- Apparent magnitude (V): 12.62
- Apparent dimensions (V): 3.4′

Physical characteristics
- Mass: 1.01×10^{5} M_{☉}
- Metallicity: [Fe/H] = −1.78 dex
- Estimated age: 12.74±2.00 Gyr
- Other designations: KMHK 1756, [SL63] 895, ESO 87-24, LW 481

NGC 2257 is a globular cluster that lies on the outskirts of the Large Magellanic Cloud (LMC). It was discovered in 1834 by John Herschel. The compiler of the New General Catalogue, John Louis Emil Dreyer, described this cluster as "faint, considerably large, round, very gradually a little brighter middle, mottled but not resolved, 17.0 seconds of time diameter." At an aperture of 30.5 arcseconds, its apparent V-band magnitude is 12.62, but at this wavelength, it has 0.12 magnitudes of interstellar extinction.

NGC 2257 is quite old, at about 12.74 billion years old. Its estimated mass is 1.01×10^{5} M_{☉}, and its total luminosity is 5.1×10^{4} L_{☉}, leading to a mass-to-luminosity ratio of 2.00 M_{☉}/L_{☉}. All else equal, older star clusters have higher mass-to-luminosity ratios; that is, they have lower luminosities for the same mass.
