= NGC 1898 =

Globular cluster in the constellation Dorado

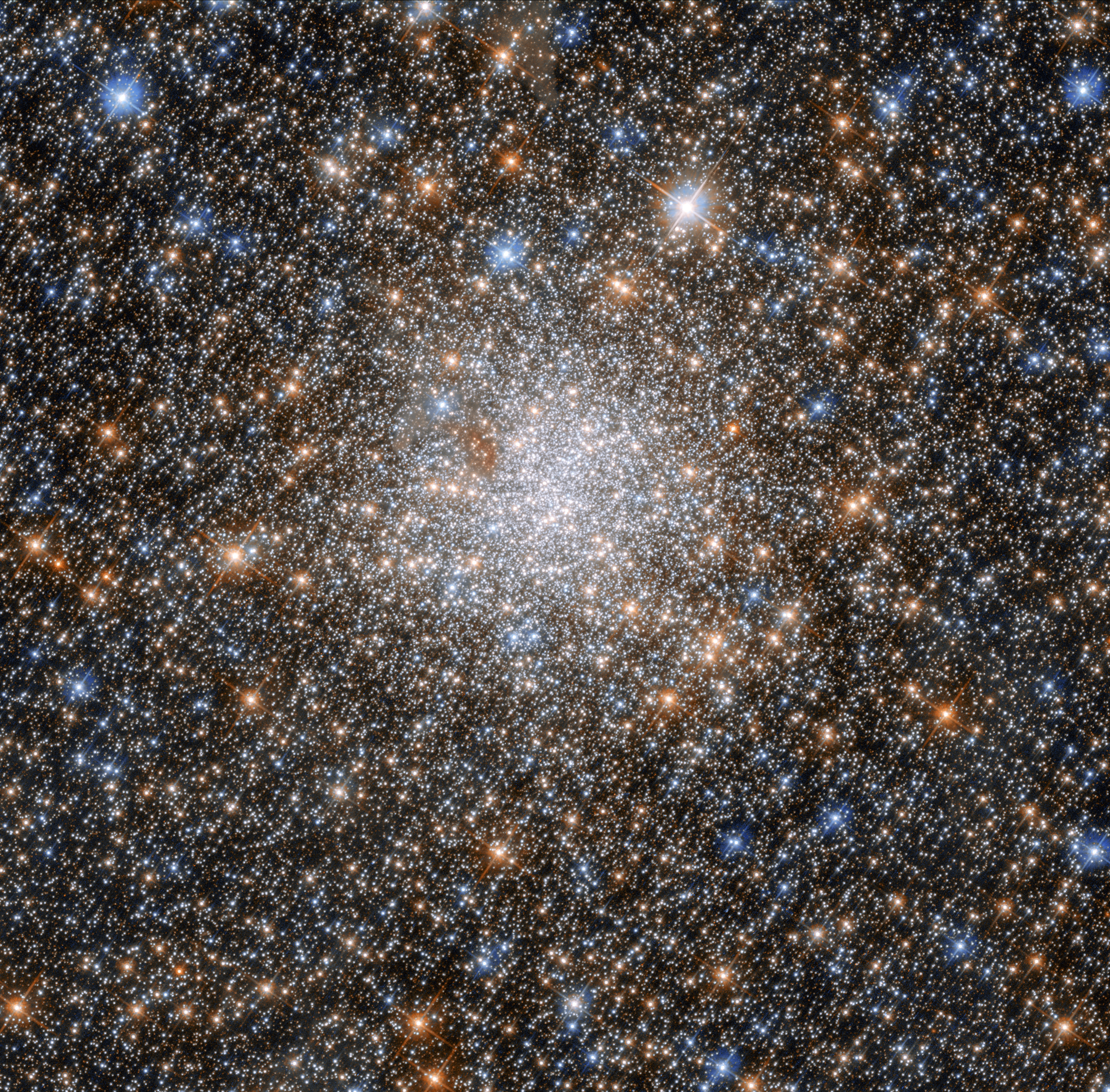
- NGC 1898 taken by Hubble Space Telescope.

Observation data (J2000 epoch)
- Constellation: Dorado
- Right ascension: 05^{h} 16^{m} 41.24^{s}
- Declination: −69° 39′ 24.4″
- Distance: 170,000 ly
- Apparent magnitude (V): 11.86

Physical characteristics
- Other designations: BSDL 2439, ESO 56-90, OGLE-CL LMC 292, [SL63] 350

NGC 1898 is a globular cluster in the constellation of Dorado at an approximate distance of 170,000 light-years. NGC 1898 is located in the Large Magellanic Cloud, a satellite galaxy of the Milky Way, and was for some time believed to be discovered by John Herschel in 1834; however recent research shows it was first observed by James Dunlop in 1826.
