= NGC 1856 =

Star cluster in the constellation Dorado

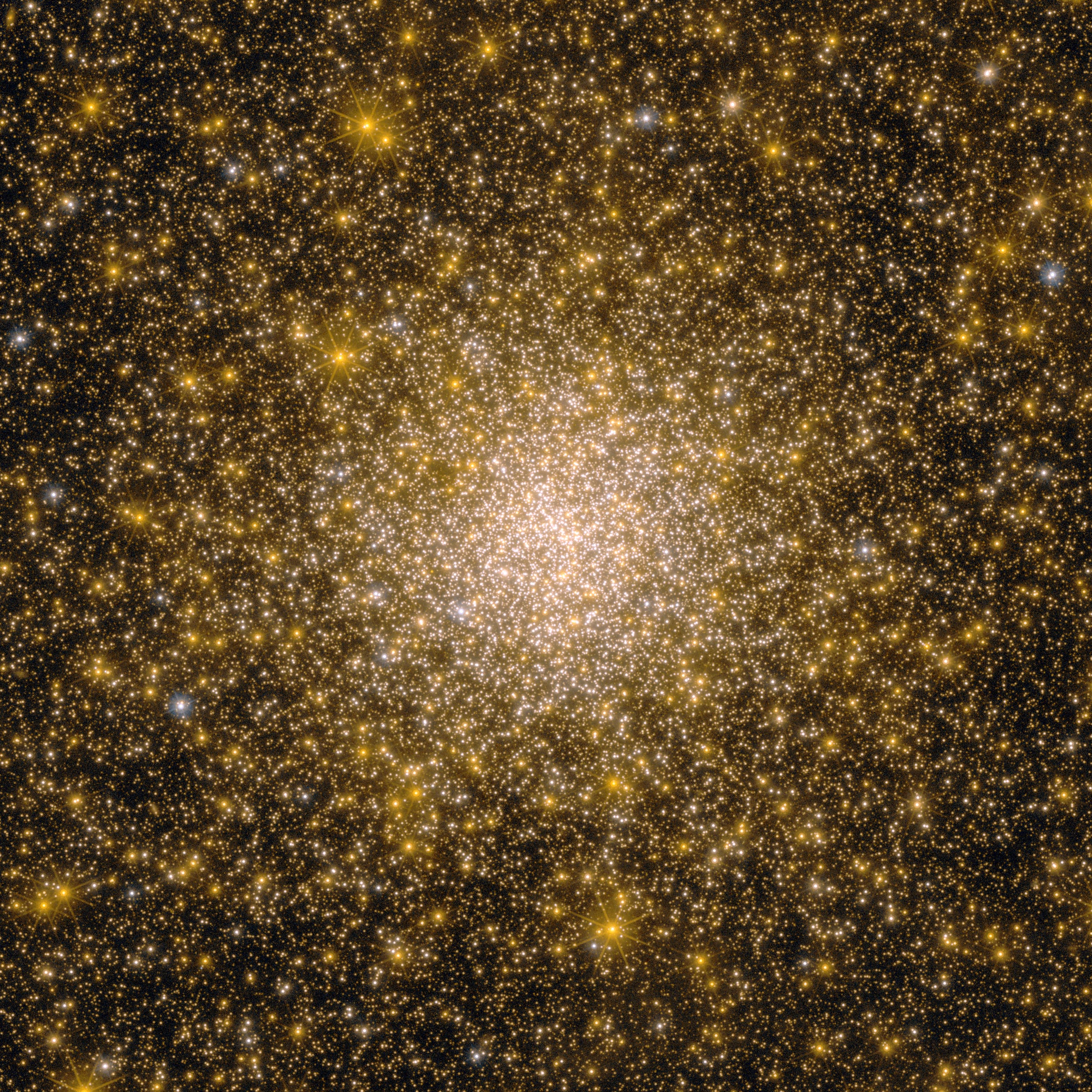
- Hubble Space Telescope photograph of NGC 1856

Observation data (J2000.0 epoch)
- Constellation: Dorado
- Right ascension: 05^{h} 09^{m} 29.4^{s}
- Declination: −69° 07′ 39″
- Apparent magnitude (V): 10.1

Physical characteristics

NGC 1856 is a young, massive star cluster similar to a "blue globular cluster" in the Magellanic Clouds in the constellation Dorado. Its age was initially reported estimated to be 80 million years, and later estimated to be around 300 million years The object was discovered in 1826 by James Dunlop with a 9-inch reflecting telescope.
