= NGC 1852 =

Star cluster in the constellation Dorado

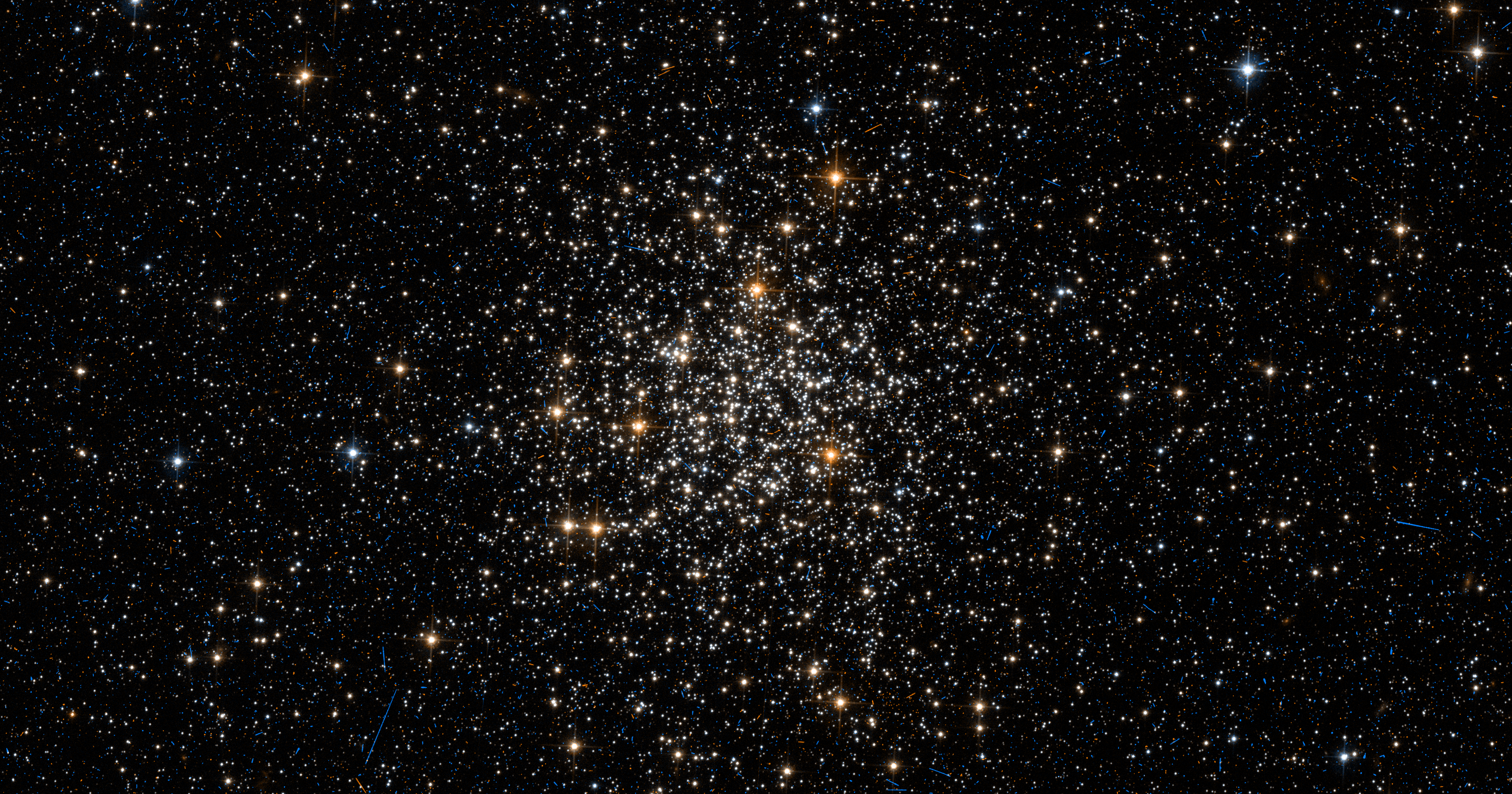
- Hubble Space Telescope photograph of NGC 1852

Observation data (J2000.0 epoch)
- Right ascension: 05^{h} 09^{m} 24^{s}
- Declination: −67° 46.38′
- Apparent magnitude (V): 12.0
- Apparent dimensions (V): 2'

Physical characteristics

Associations
- Constellation: Dorado

NGC 1852 is a star cluster in the Large Magellanic Cloud in the constellation Dorado. It was discovered in 1826 by James Dunlop with a 9-inch reflecting telescope.
