= NGC 1903 =

Star cluster in the constellation Dorado

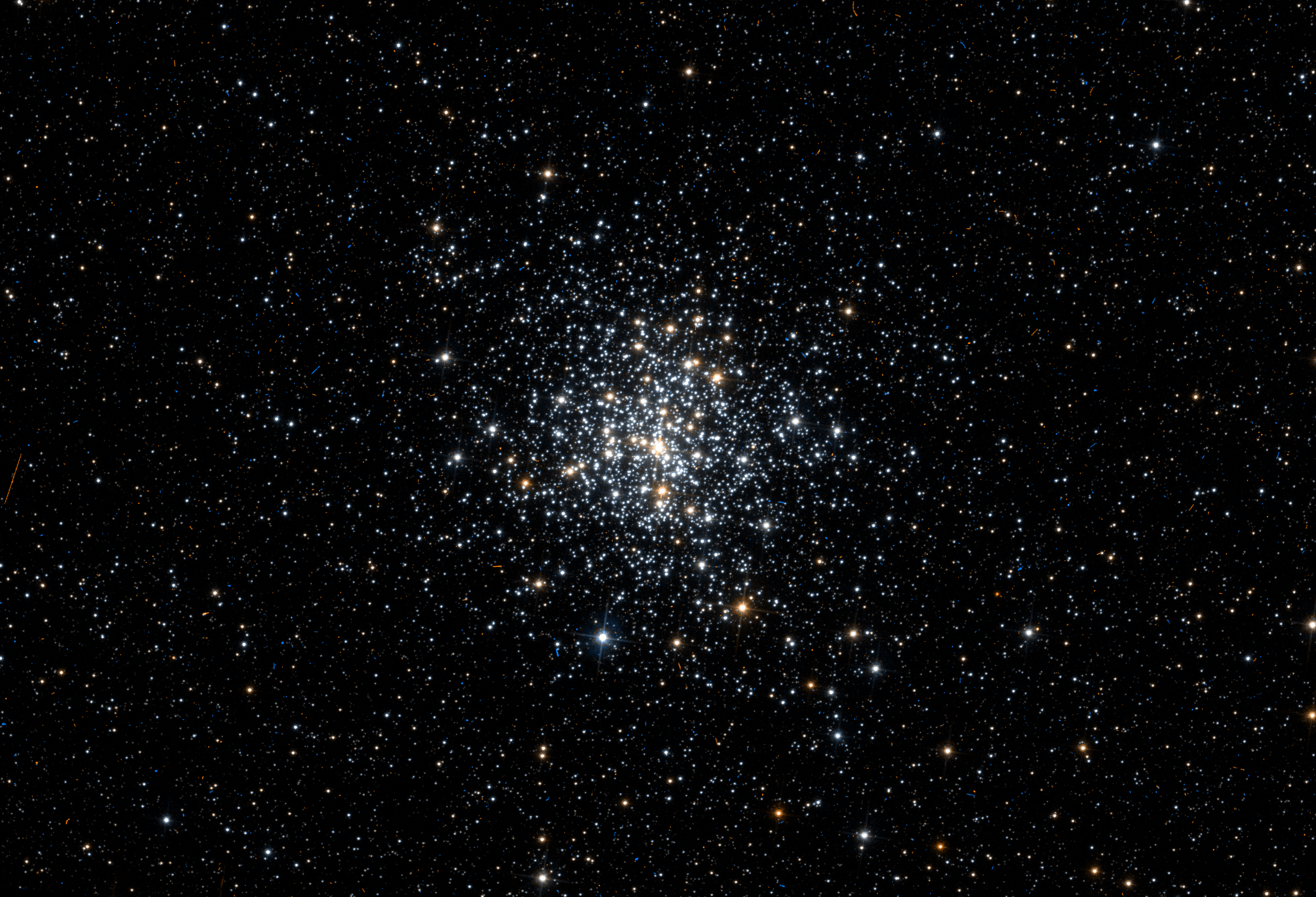
- Hubble Space Telescope photograph of NGC 1903

Observation data (J2000.0 epoch)
- Right ascension: 05^{h} 17^{m} 22.4^{s}
- Declination: −69° 20′ 07″
- Apparent magnitude (V): 11.9
- Apparent dimensions (V): 1′

Physical characteristics

Associations
- Constellation: Dorado

NGC 1903 is a star cluster in the Large Magellanic Cloud in the constellation Dorado. It was discovered in 1834 by John Herschel with an 18.7-inch reflecting telescope.

== Sources ==
- van Loon, J. Th.; et al. (November 2005). "Dust-enshrouded giants in clusters in the Magellanic Clouds". Astronomy and Astrophysics. 442 (2): 597–613. arXiv:astro-ph/0507571. Bibcode:2005A&A...442..597V. doi:10.1051/0004-6361:20053528.
