= NGC 1847 =

Star cluster in the constellation Dorado

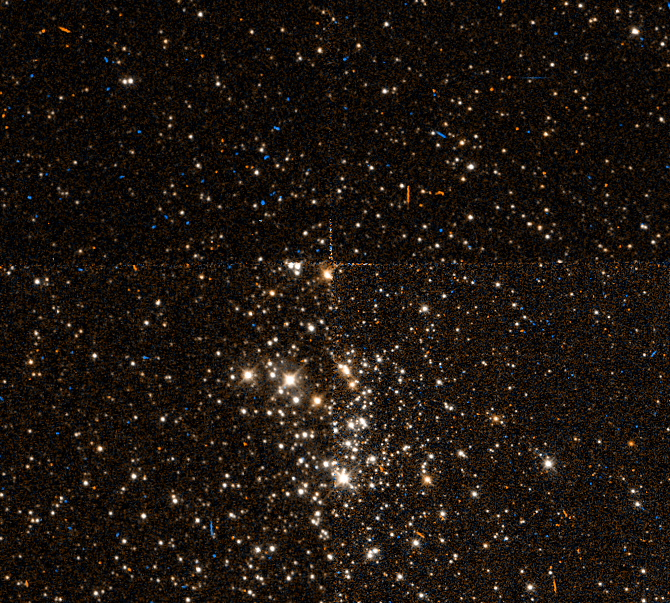
- Hubble Space Telescope photograph of NGC 1847

Observation data (J2000.0 epoch)
- Right ascension: 05^{h} 07^{m} 8.2^{s}
- Declination: −68° 58′ 17″
- Apparent magnitude (V): 12.4

Physical characteristics

Associations
- Constellation: Dorado

NGC 1847 is a young, massive star cluster in the bar of the Large Magellanic Cloud in the constellation Dorado. It was discovered in 1835 by John Herschel with an 18.7-inch reflecting telescope.
