= NGC 2011 =

Star cluster in the constellation Dorado

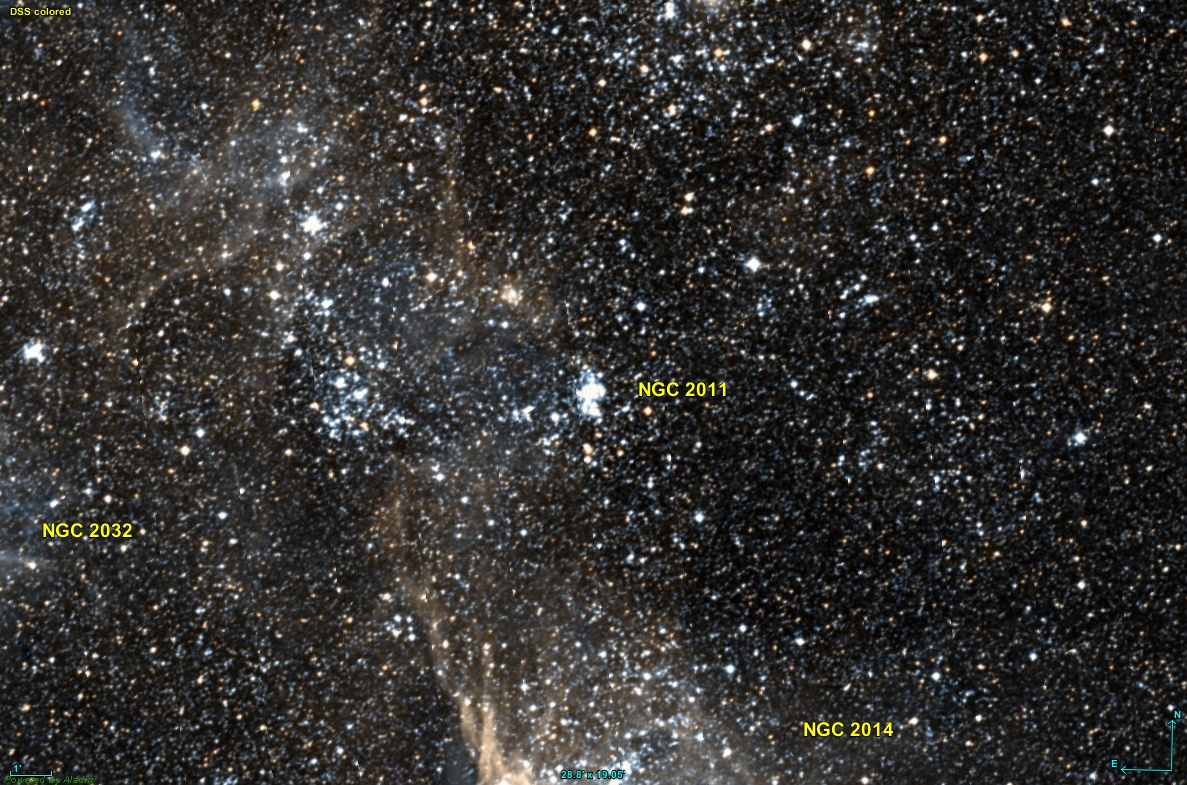
- The open cluster NGC 2011

Observation data (J2000 epoch)
- Right ascension: 05^{h} 32^{m} 16^{s}
- Declination: −67° 30′ 21″
- Apparent magnitude (V): 10.58

Physical characteristics

Associations
- Constellation: Doradus

NGC 2011 (also known as ESO 56-114) is a small open cluster located in the constellation Dorado. It was discovered by 19th century Scottish astronomer James Dunlop in 1826 and has a visual magnitude of 10.58, being visible with a telescope having an aperture of 6 inches (150mm) or more. It is located in the Large Magellanic Cloud and is estimated to be between 60 and 65 light years across.
