= NGC 1970 =

Open cluster in the constellation Dorado

Nebula

Observation data: epoch
- Right ascension: 05^{h} 26^{m} 49.0^{s}
- Declination: −68° 49′ 42″
- Apparent magnitude (V): 10.28
- Constellation: Dorado
- Designations: ESO 56-SC127

NGC 1970 (also known as ESO 56-SC127) is a bright open cluster and emission nebula in the constellation Dorado in the Large Magellanic Cloud. It was discovered by John Herschel on January 31, 1835. Its apparent size is 8.0. It is commonly known as the Tulip Nebula.

== See also ==
- List of NGC objects (1001–2000)
