= NGC 1997 =

Open star cluster within the Large Magellanic cloud

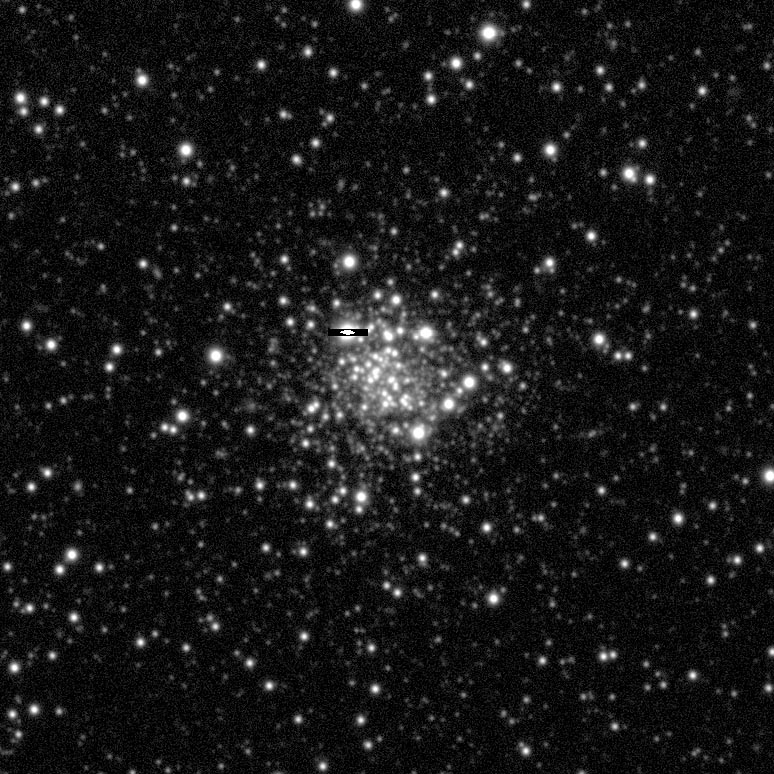
- NGC 1997 Open cluster within the Large Magellanic Cloud.

Observation data (J2000.0 epoch)
- Right ascension: 05^{h} 30^{m} 34.7^{s}
- Declination: −63° 11′ 58″
- Apparent magnitude (V): 13.43
- Apparent dimensions (V): 1.80

Physical characteristics
- Other designations: ESO 86-SC1, GC 1200, h 2886

Associations
- Constellation: Dorado

NGC 1997 (also known as ESO 86-SC1) is an open cluster located in the constellation Dorado which is part of the Large Magellanic Cloud. It was discovered by John Herschel on November 30, 1834. Its apparent magnitude is 13.43 and its size is 1.80 arc minutes.
