= NGC 1974 =

Open cluster in the constellation Dorado

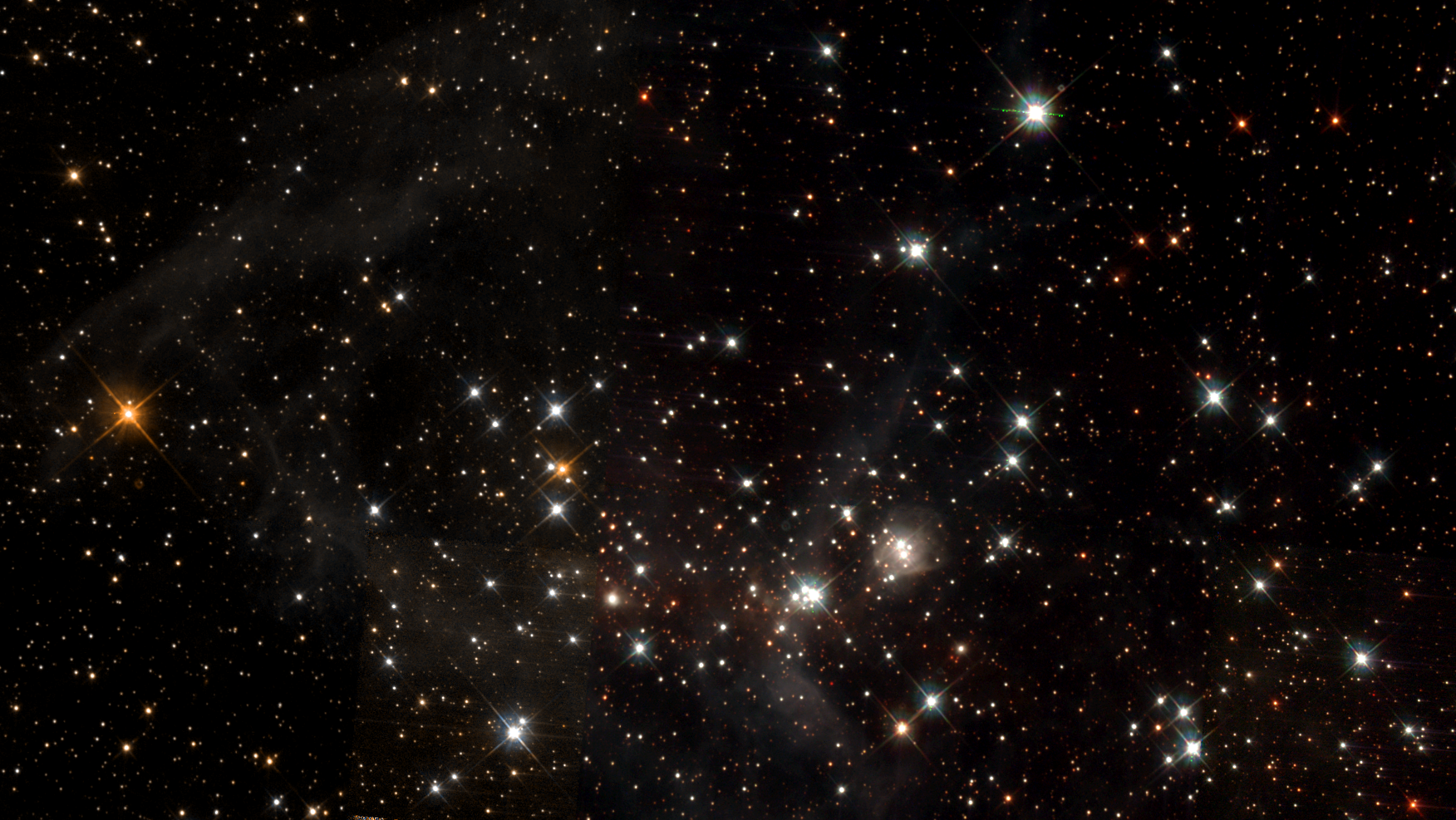
- NGC 1974 through the Hubble Space Telescope

Observation data (J2000.0 epoch)
- Right ascension: 05^{h} 28^{m} 59.02^{s}
- Declination: −67° 25′ 26.9″
- Apparent magnitude (V): 9.0
- Apparent dimensions (V): 1.7

Physical characteristics
- Other designations: NGC 1991, ESO 85-SC89, GC 1178, h 2877, Dun 213

Associations
- Constellation: Dorado

NGC 1974 (also known as NGC 1991 and ESO 85-SC89) is an open cluster associated with an emission nebula which is located in the constellation Dorado and is part of the Large Magellanic Cloud. It was discovered by James Dunlop on November 6, 1826, and later observed by John Herschel on January 2, 1837, subsequently cataloged as NGC 1991. Its apparent magnitude is 9.0 and its size is 1.7 arc minutes.
