= NGC 2004 =

Open cluster in the constellation Dorado

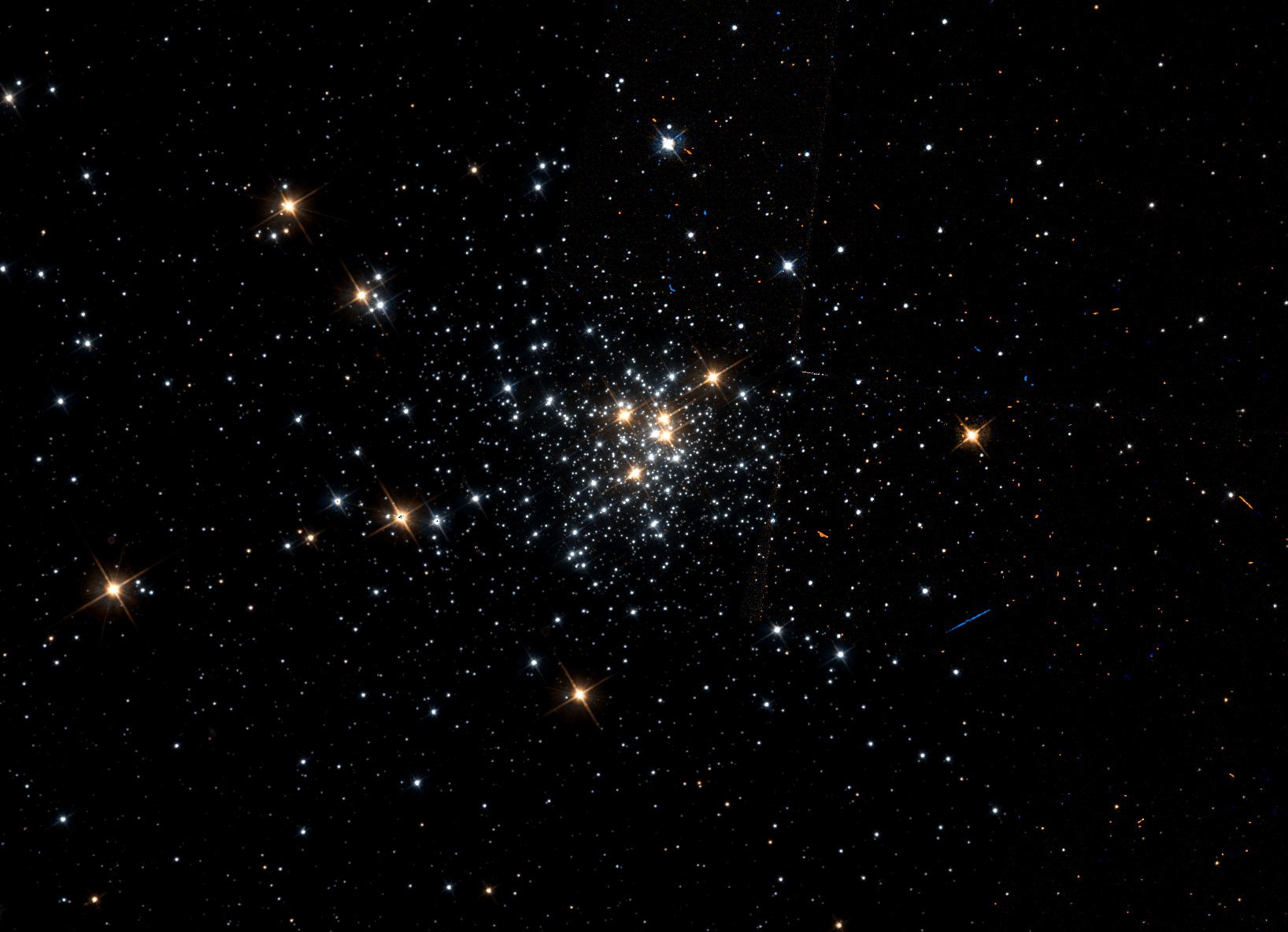
- Hubble Space Telescope image of NGC 2004

Observation data (J2000 epoch)
- Right ascension: 05^{h} 30^{m} 41.340^{s}
- Declination: −67° 17′ 21.83″
- Distance: 163.1 ± 0.3 ly (50 ± 0.1 pc)
- Apparent magnitude (V): 9.6
- Apparent dimensions (V): 3.0' × 2.8'

Physical characteristics
- Mass: ~2.3×10^{4} M_{☉}
- Estimated age: 20 Ma
- Other designations: NGC 2004, ESO 86-SC4

Associations
- Constellation: Dorado

NGC 2004 (also known as ESO 86-SC4) is an open cluster of stars in the southern constellation of Dorado. It was discovered by Scottish astronomer James Dunlop on September 24, 1826. This is a young, massive cluster with an age of about 20 million years and 23,000 times the mass of the Sun. It has a core radius of 2.85 ± 0.46 pc (9.3 ± 1.5 ly). NGC 2004 is a member of the Large Magellanic Cloud, which is a satellite galaxy of the Milky Way.
