= NGC 1872 =

Open cluster in the constellation Dorado

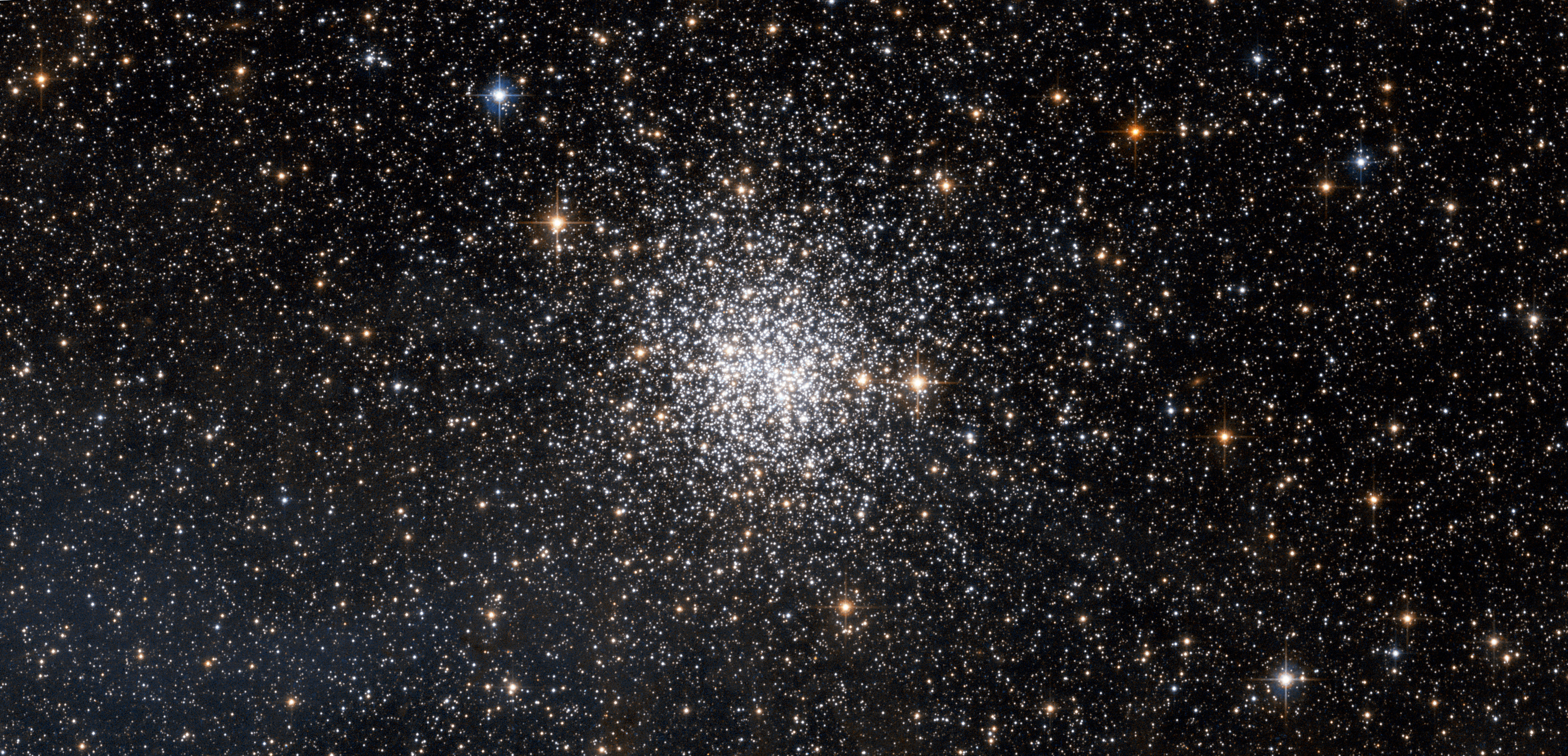
- NGC 1872, a rich cluster of thousands of stars lying in our small neighbouring galaxy, the Large Magellanic Cloud, 3′ view Credit: ESA/Hubble and NASA

Observation data (J2000 epoch)
- Right ascension: 05^{h} 13^{m} 11.7^{s}
- Declination: −69° 18′ 45″
- Apparent magnitude (V): 11.4
- Apparent dimensions (V): 1′

Physical characteristics

Associations
- Constellation: Dorado

NGC 1872 is an open cluster within the Large Magellanic Cloud in the constellation Dorado. It was discovered by James Dunlop in 1826.

NGC 1872 has characteristics of both globular clusters and open clusters - it is visually as rich as a typical globular but is much younger, and, like many open clusters, has bluer stars. Such intermediate clusters are common in the Large Magellanic Cloud.

== Gallery ==
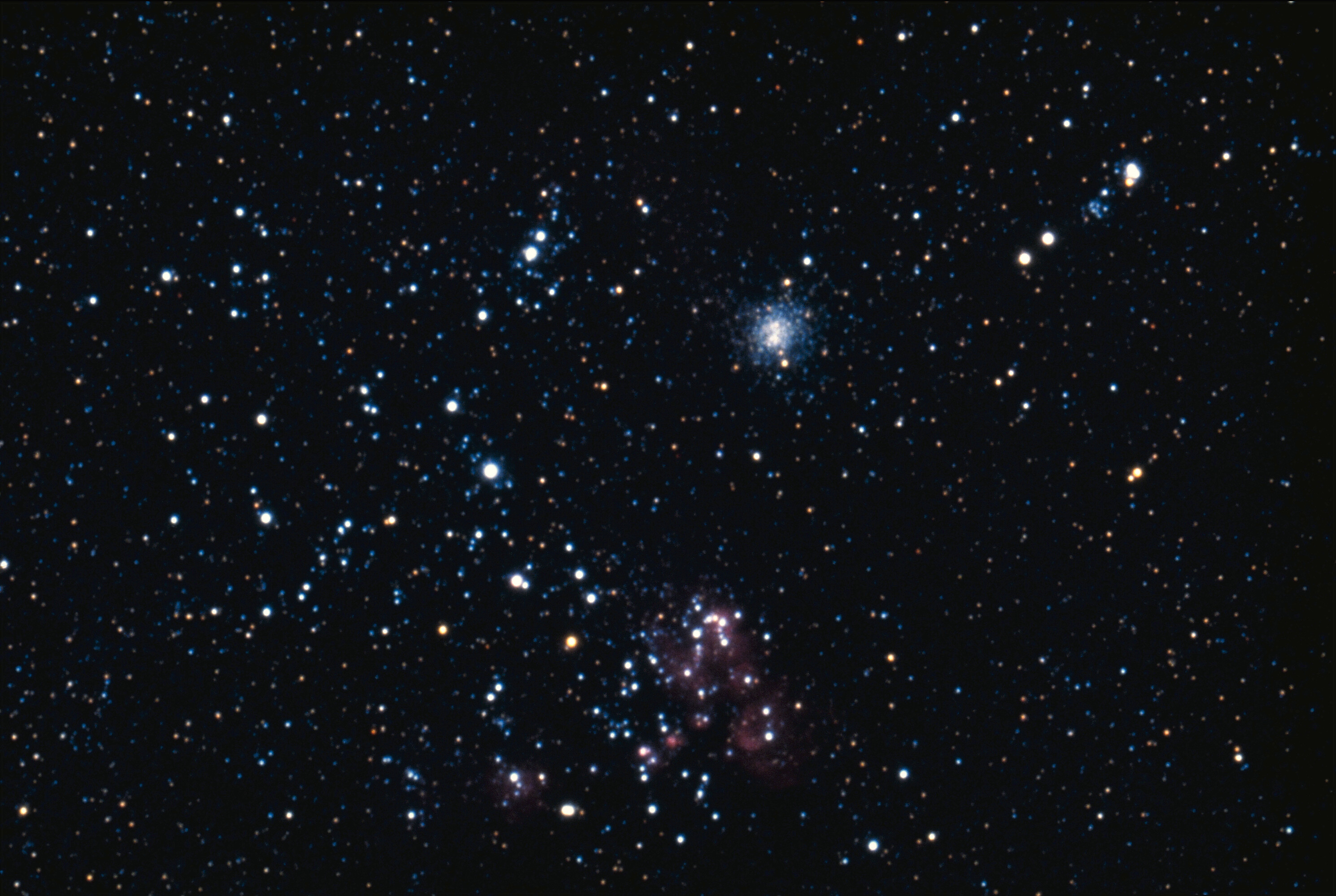
NGC 1872 wide field view.
