= NGC 1983 =

Open cluster in the constellation Dorado

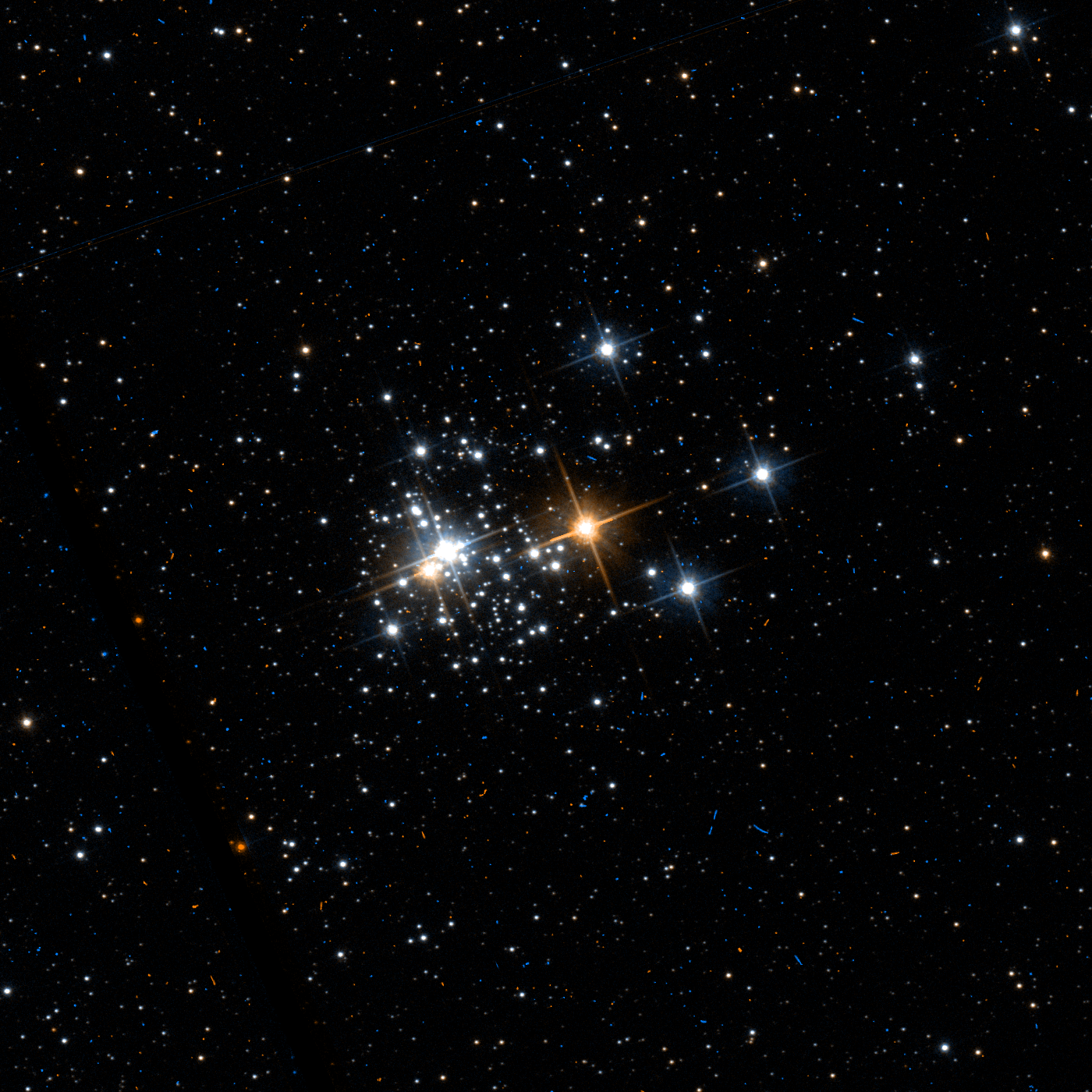
- The open cluster NGC 1983 through the Hubble Space Telescope; Credit: NASA/ESA

Observation data (J2000.0 epoch)
- Right ascension: 05^{h} 27^{m} 44.2^{s}
- Declination: −68° 59′ 10″
- Apparent magnitude (V): 9.9
- Apparent dimensions (V): 1.0

Physical characteristics
- Other designations: ESO 56-SC133

Associations
- Constellation: Dorado

NGC 1983 (also known as ESO 56-SC133) is an open cluster associated with an emission nebula which is located in the constellation Dorado and part of the Large Magellanic Cloud. It was discovered by John Herschel on 11 November 1836. It has an apparent magnitude of 9.9 and its size is 1.0 arc minutes.
