= NGC 1860 =

Open cluster in the constellation Dorado

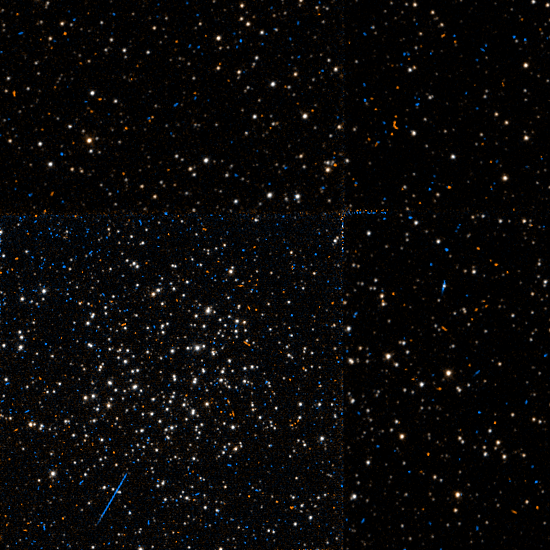
- Hubble Space Telescope photograph of NGC 1860

Observation data (J2000.0 epoch)
- Right ascension: 05^{h} 10^{m} 41^{s}
- Declination: −68° 45′ 13″
- Apparent magnitude (V): 12.0
- Apparent dimensions (V): 2'

Physical characteristics

Associations
- Constellation: Dorado

NGC 1860 is an open cluster in the Large Magellanic Cloud in the constellation Dorado. It was discovered in 1836 by John Herschel with an 18.7-inch reflecting telescope.
