= NGC 1859 =

Open cluster in the constellation Dorado

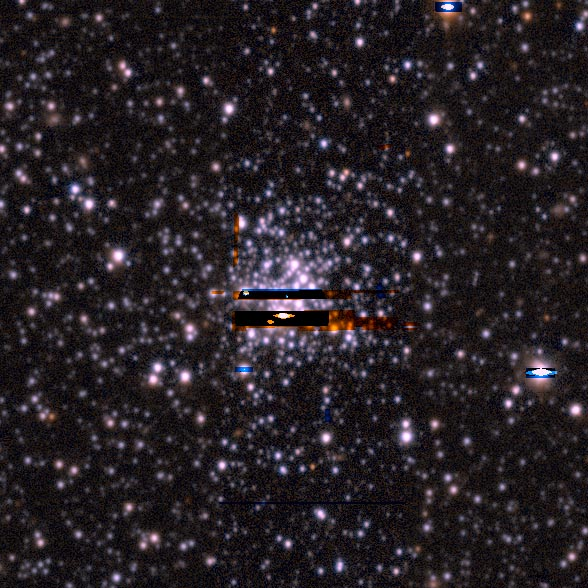
- NGC 1859 (legacy surveys)

Observation data (J2000.0 epoch)
- Right ascension: 05^{h} 11^{m} 31^{s}
- Declination: −65° 15.0′
- Apparent magnitude (V): 12.26

Physical characteristics

Associations
- Constellation: Dorado

NGC 1859 is an open cluster in the constellation Dorado. It was discovered in 1834 by the British astronomer John Herschel with an 18.7-inch reflecting telescope.
