= NGC 1978 =

Globular cluster in the constellation Dorado

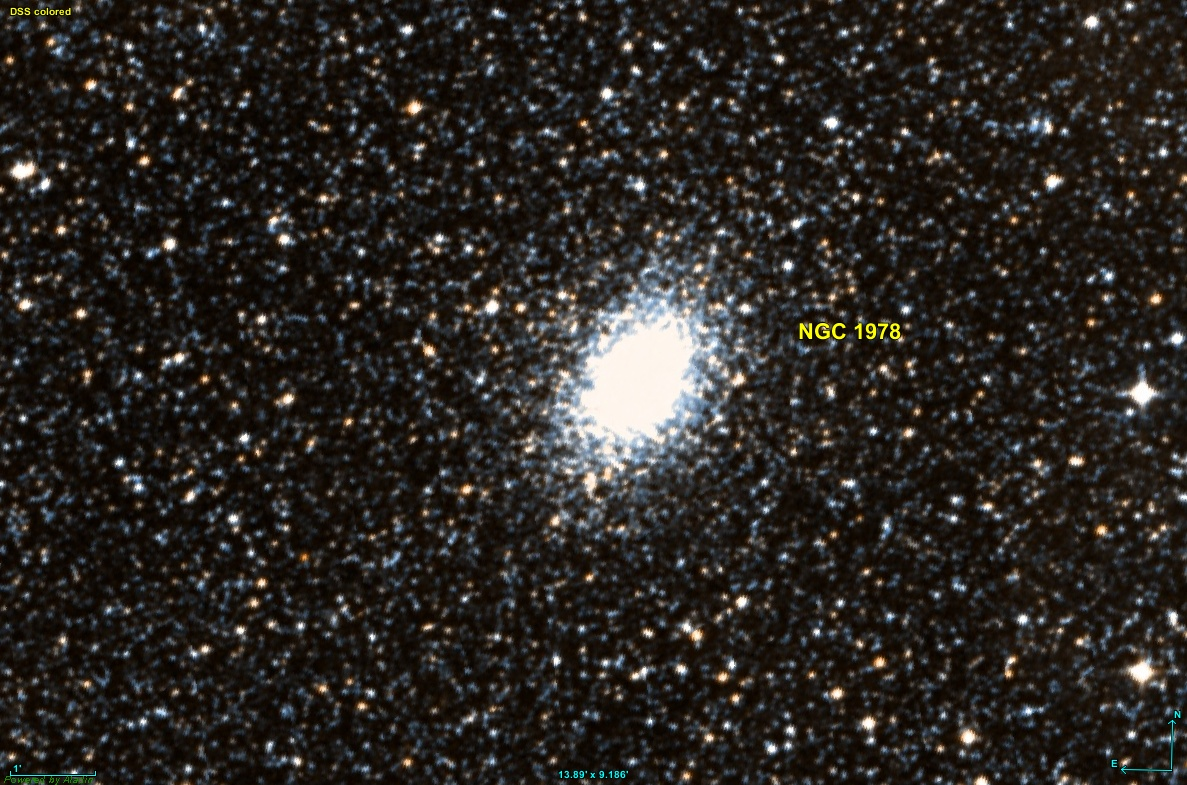
- The globular cluster NGC 1978

Observation data (J2000 epoch)
- Class: VI
- Constellation: Dorado
- Right ascension: 05^{h} 28^{m} 48^{s}
- Declination: −66° 13′ 59″
- Distance: 159,700 ly (49,000 pc)
- Apparent magnitude (V): 10.12
- Apparent dimensions (V): 10.7′ × 3.9′

Physical characteristics
- Mass: 2×10^{5} M_{☉}
- Metallicity: [Fe/H] = −0.38 ± 0.02 dex
- $\begin{smallmatrix}\left[\ce{M}/\ce{H}\right]\end{smallmatrix}$ = 0.008 dex
- Estimated age: 1.9 ± 0.1 Gyr
- Other designations: ESO 85-SC90, KMHK 944

NGC 1978 (also known as ESO 85-SC90) is an elliptical shaped globular cluster in the constellation Dorado. It is located within the Large Magellanic Cloud. It was discovered by James Dunlop on November 6, 1826. At an aperture of 50 arcseconds, its apparent V-band magnitude is 10.20, but at this wavelength, it has 0.16 magnitudes of interstellar extinction. It appears 3.9 arcminutes wide. NGC 1978 has a radial velocity of 293.1 ± 0.9 km/s.

The northwest half of NGC 1978 is iron-rich and younger whereas the southeast part of the cluster has very little iron. NGC 1978 is also highly elliptical (ε ~ 0.30 ± 0.02), suggesting tidal action between it and the Large Magellanic Cloud. It is rich in pulsating asymptotic giant branch stars, often oxygen-rich or carbon-rich. NGC 1978 is about 2 billion years old. Its estimated mass is 1.36×10^{5} M_{☉}, and its total luminosity is 3.41×10^{5} L_{☉}, leading to a mass-to-luminosity ratio of 0.40 M_{☉}/L_{☉}. All else equal, older star clusters have higher mass-to-luminosity ratios; that is, they have lower luminosities for the same mass.
