= NGC 2002 =

Open cluster in the constellation Dorado

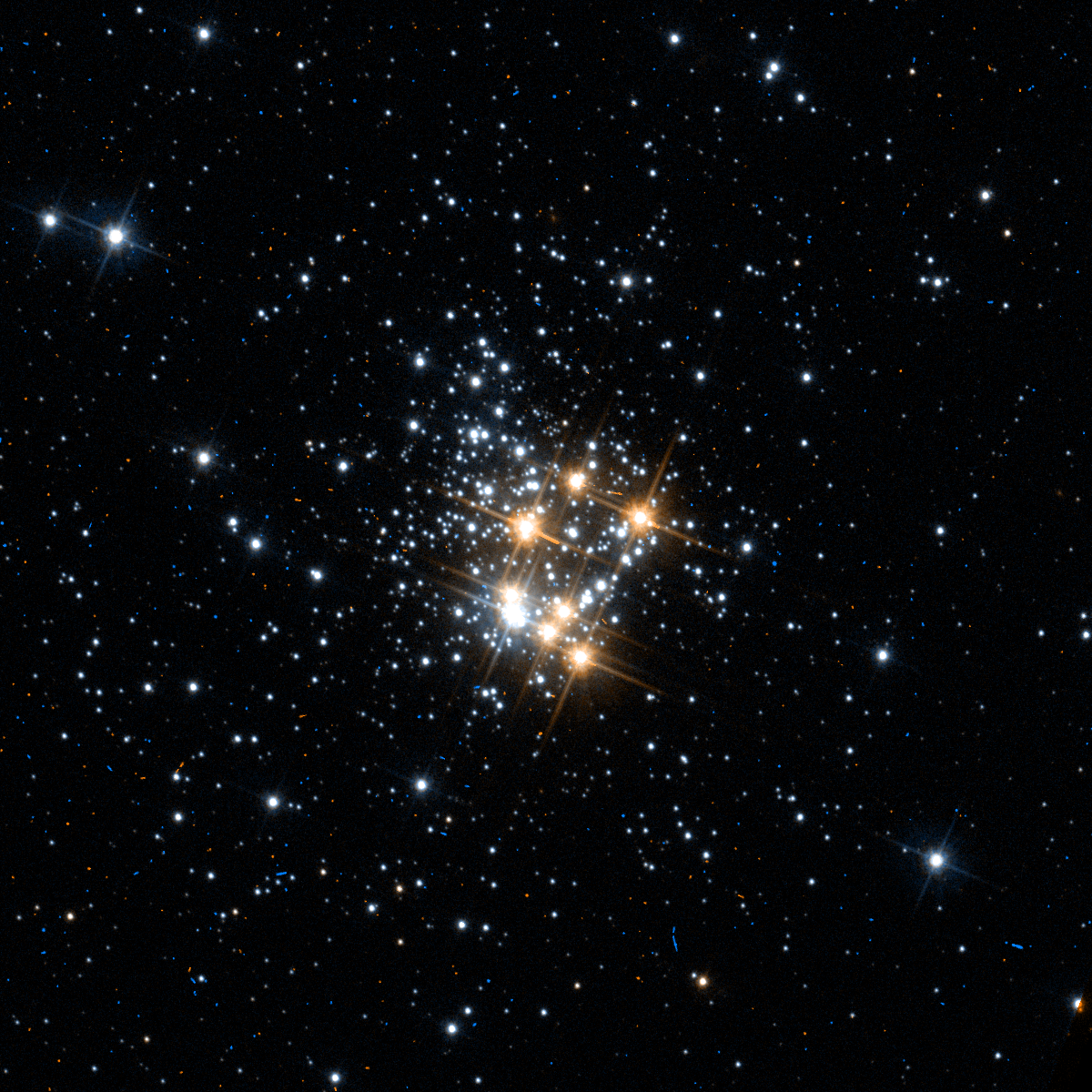
- Hubble Space Telescope image of NGC 2002

Observation data (J2000 epoch)
- Right ascension: 05^{h} 30^{m} 20.4^{s}
- Declination: −66° 53′ 03″
- Apparent dimensions (V): 10.84

Physical characteristics
- Other designations: ESO 86-SC3

Associations
- Constellation: Dorado

NGC 2002 (also known as ESO 86-SC3) is an open cluster located in the constellation Dorado and is part of the Large Magellanic Cloud. It was discovered by James Dunlop on September 24, 1826. Its apparent magnitude is 10.1, and its size is 2.0 arc minutes.

NGC 2002 contains five red supergiants, prominent in deep images of the cluster. Together with the main sequence turnoff, these tightly constrain the age of the cluster to 18 million years. The cluster shows strong stellar stratification with the brightest stars concentrated at the centre of the cluster and fainter stars dominating further out.
