= NGC 2078 =

Emission nebula in the constellation Dorado

Emission nebula
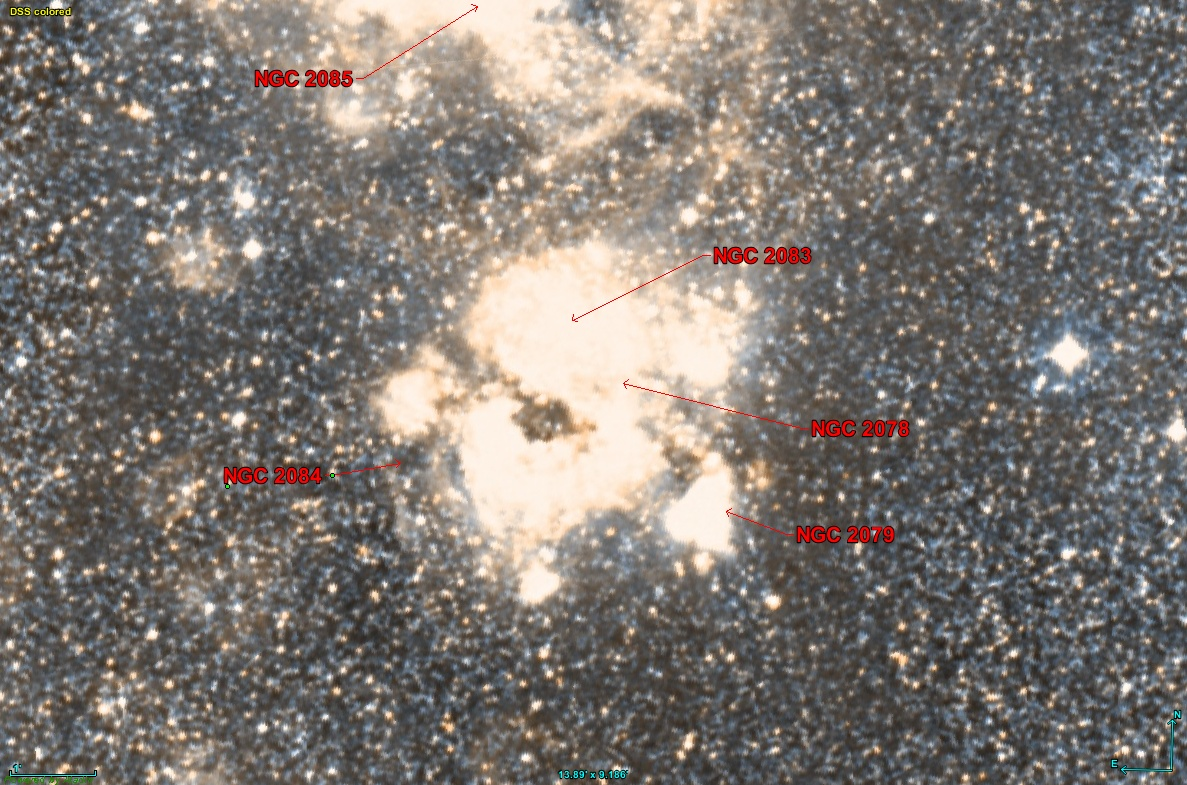

Observation data: J2000.0 epoch
- Right ascension: 05^{h} 39^{m} 54^{s}
- Declination: −69° 44′ 54″
- Distance: 160,000 ly
- Constellation: Dorado
- Designations: ESO 57-EN10

NGC 2078 is an emission nebula with an apparent magnitude of 10.9, located in the constellation Dorado. It was discovered on September 24, 1826, by James Dunlop.
