= LEDA 89996 =

Spiral galaxy in the constellation Dorado

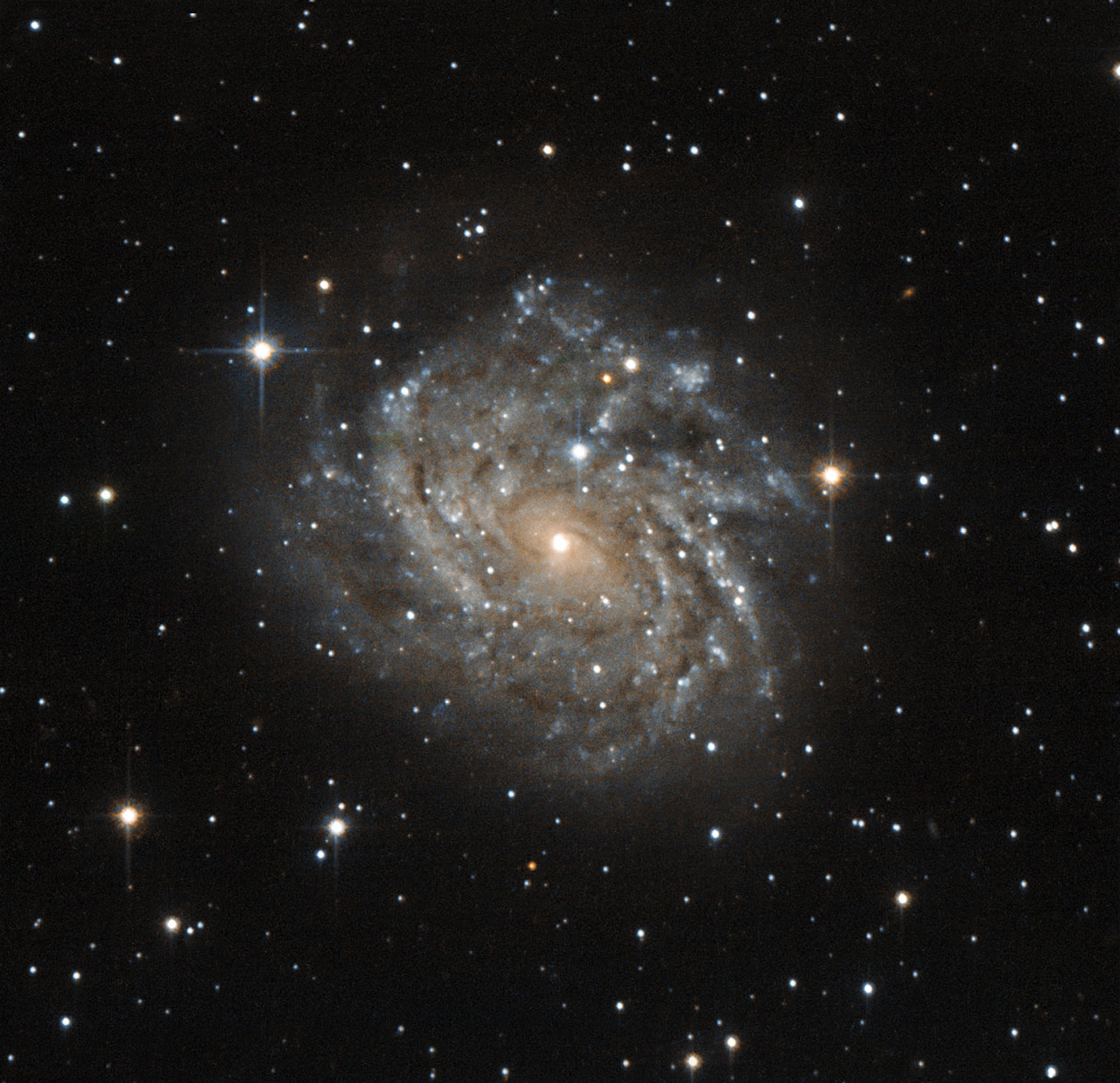
- The spiral galaxy LEDA 89996, taken by the Hubble Space Telescope

Observation data (J2000 epoch)
- Constellation: Dorado
- Right ascension: 04^{h} 54^{m} 28.29^{s}
- Declination: −66° 25′ 28.06″
- Redshift: 0.023700
- Heliocentric radial velocity: 7105(km/s)
- Apparent magnitude (V): 16.9

Characteristics
- Type: S
- Apparent size (V): 0.53′ × 0.48′

Other designations
- 2MASS J04542829-6625280, 2MASX J04542820-6625275

LEDA 89996, also known by its 2MASS designation 2MASS J04542829-6625280, is a spiral galaxy. It is located within the constellation Dorado and appears very close to the Large Magellanic Cloud.

The galaxy was observed by the Hubble Space Telescope on 6 July 2015 and is similar in appearance to the Milky Way being spiral shaped with winding spiral arms. The darker patches between the arms is dust and gas. Many new stars form in this area making the spirals appear very bright.
