= NGC 2027 =

Open cluster in the constellation Dorado

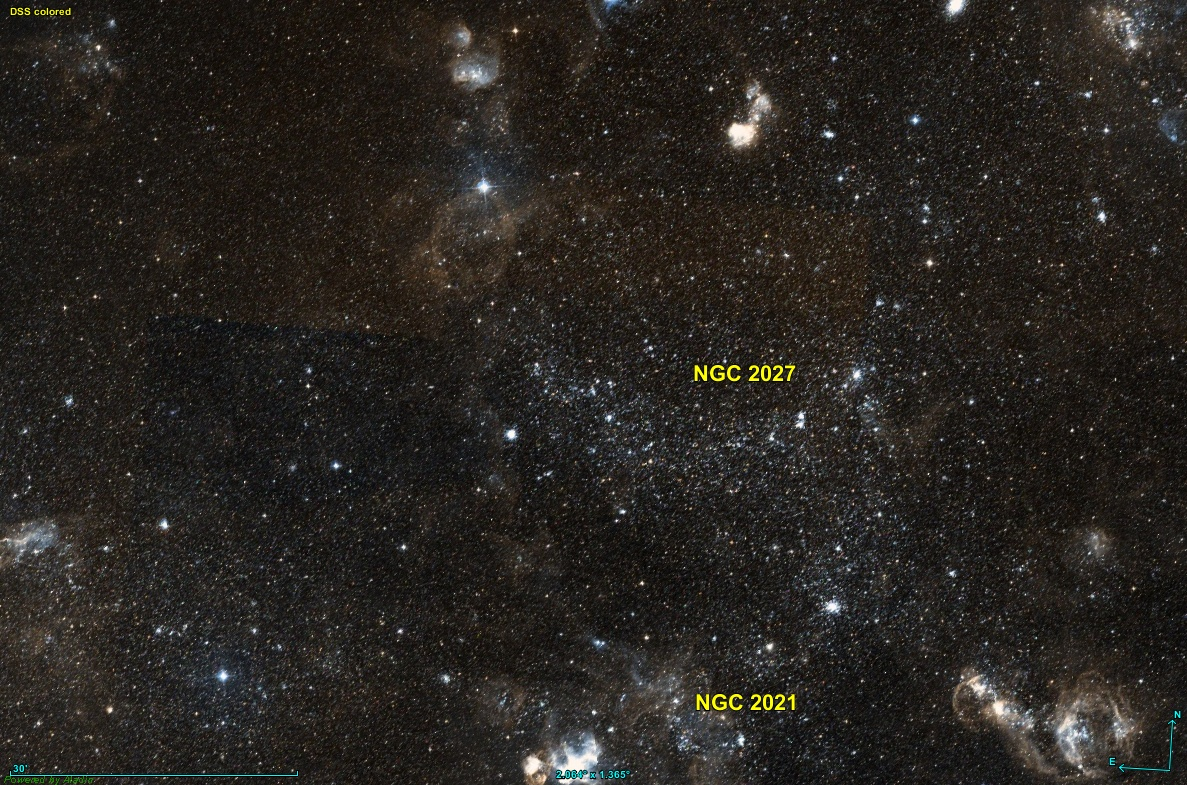
- NGC 2027, just right of centre, with NGC 2021 just below it

Observation data (J2000 epoch)
- Right ascension: 05^{h} 31^{m} 00.33^{s}
- Declination: −66° 55′ 05.75″
- Distance: 160 kly (50 kpc)
- Apparent magnitude (V): 11.5
- Apparent dimensions (V): 0.7′

Physical characteristics
- Other designations: ESO 86-SC13

Associations
- Constellation: Dorado

NGC 2027 (also known as ESO 86-SC13) is a 12th magnitude open cluster located in the constellation Dorado which is also part of the Large Magellanic Cloud and was discovered by James Dunlop on November 6, 1826. Its apparent diameter is 0.7 arcminutes.
