= NGC 1901 =

Open cluster in the constellation Dorado

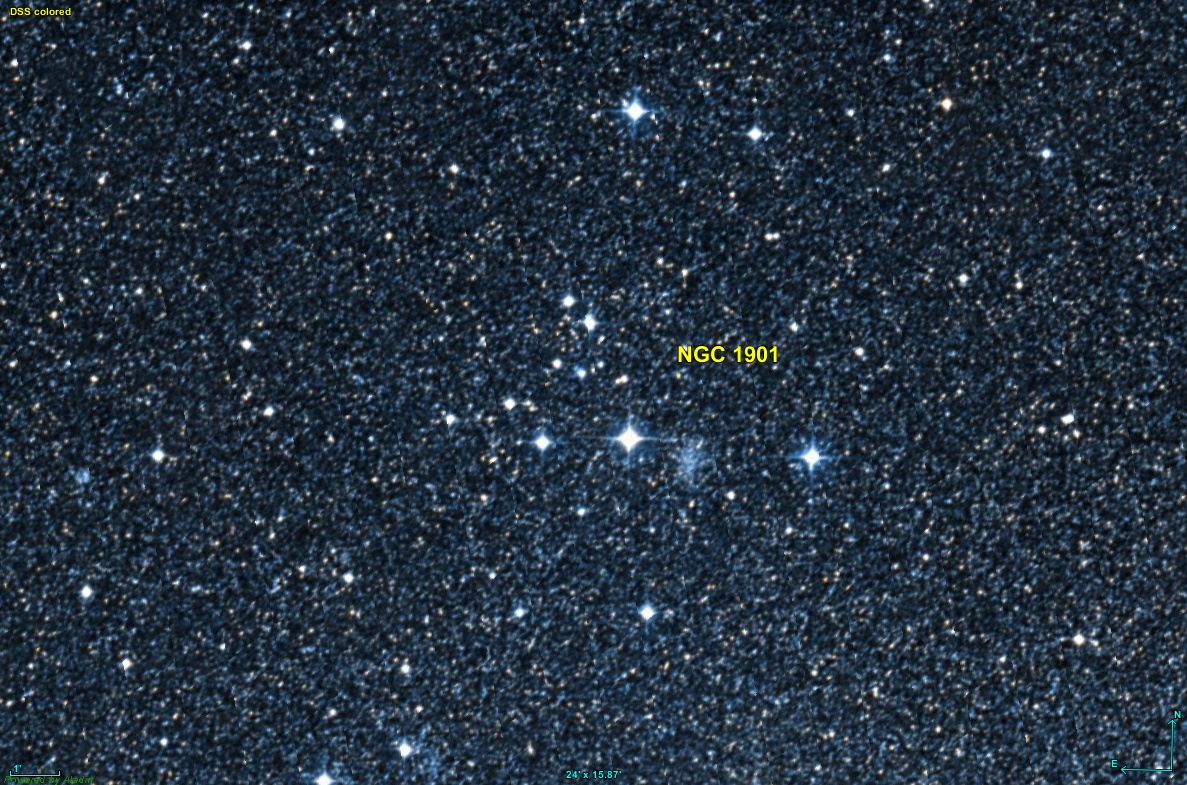
- The open cluster NGC 1901

Observation data Epoch J2000 Equinox ICRS
- Constellation: Dorado
- Right ascension: 05^{h} 18^{m} 11.0^{s}
- Declination: −68° 27′ 00″

Characteristics

Astrometry
Radial velocity (R_{v})	-1.354 km/s
Distance	1,354 ly (415 pc)

Details
Age	0.6 Gyr

Other designations
- ESO 56-SC91, OCL 791

NGC 1901 is an open cluster in the constellation Dorado. Although it is part of the Milky Way, it appears superimposed over the Large Magellanic Cloud. It has a bright middle and is a little rich, with stars from 7th magnitude downwards. The celestial object was discovered on 30 December 1836 by the British astronomer John Herschel. The cluster is sparsely populated with GAIA data suggesting a membership of around 80 stars. It is considered unlikely it will survive its next pass through the Milky Way’s galactic plane in about 18 million years time.
