= NGC 1935 =

Emission nebula in the constellation Dorado

Emission nebula
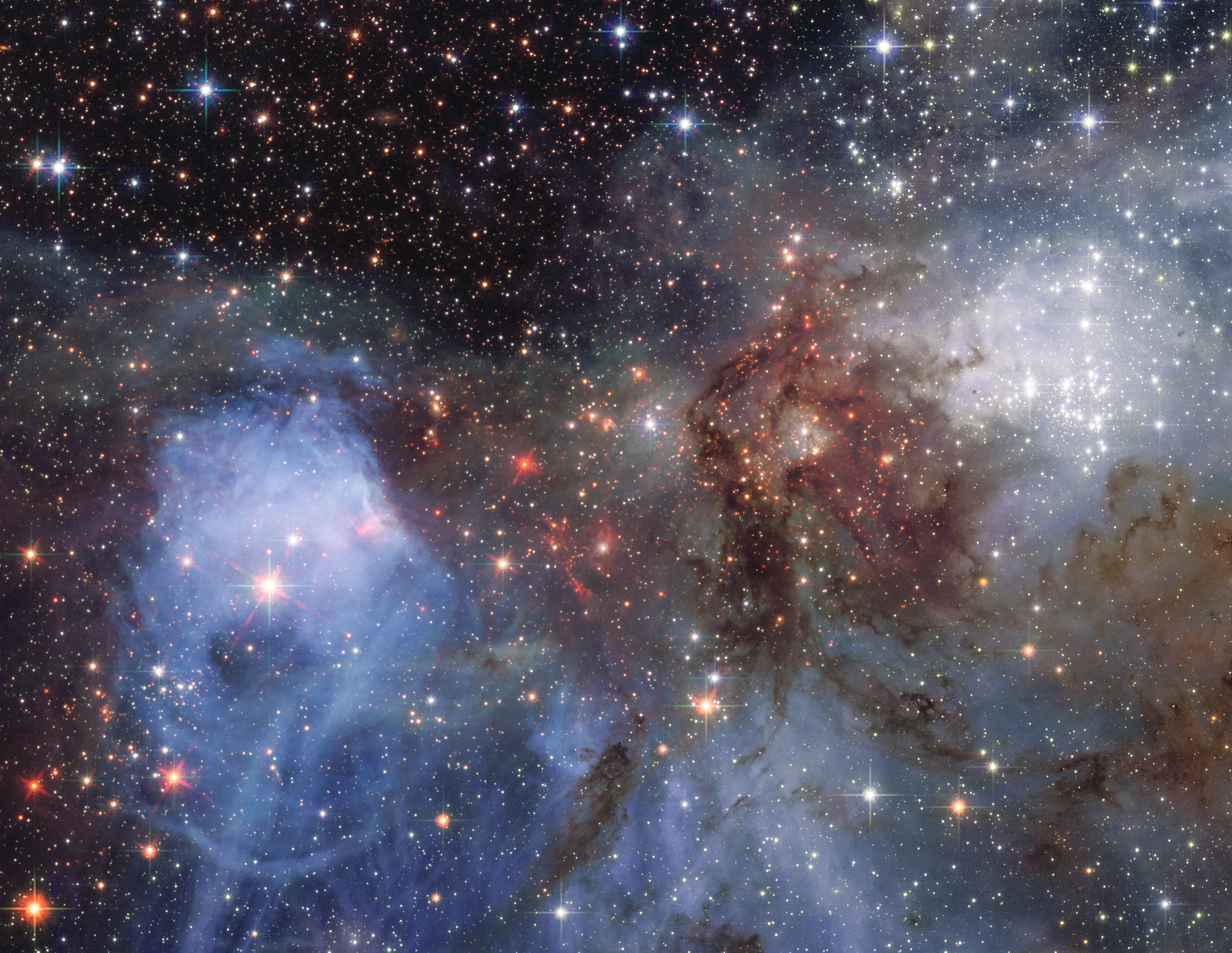
- NGC 1935, just left of centre with NGC 1936, just bottom left of centre

Observation data: epoch
- Right ascension: 05^{h} 21^{m} 58.8^{s}
- Declination: −67° 57′ 27″
- Constellation: Dorado
- Designations: ESO 56-EN110, IC 2126

NGC 1935 (also known as ESO 56-EN110 and IC 2126) is an emission nebula which is part of the larger LMC-N44 nebula in the constellation Dorado. NGC 1935 is also located in the Large Magellanic Cloud. It was discovered by John Herschel in 1834 and added to the Catalogue of Nebulae and Clusters of Stars as NGC 1935, then was observed by Williamina Fleming in 1901 and later added to the Index Catalogue as IC 2126.
