= NGC 1934 =

Emission nebula in the constellation Dorado

Emission nebula
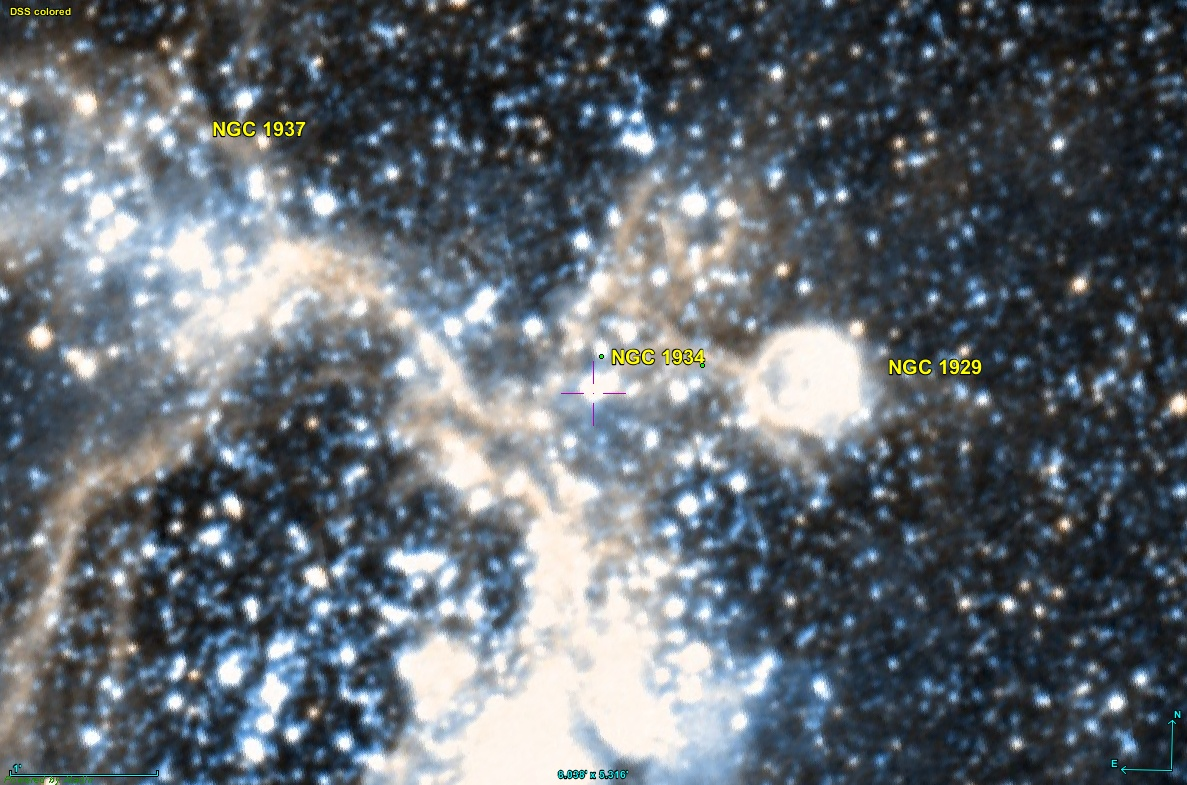
- NGC 1934, just above the centre, with NGC 1929 just to the right of the centre and NGC 1937, which is at the far top left

Observation data: epoch
- Right ascension: 05^{h} 21^{m} 54.0^{s}
- Declination: −67° 54′ 54″
- Apparent magnitude (V): 10.50
- Constellation: Dorado
- Designations: ESO 56-SC109

NGC 1934 (also known as ESO 56-SC109) is an emission nebula located in the constellation Dorado and is part of the Large Magellanic Cloud. It was discovered by John Herschel on November 23, 1834. Its apparent magnitude is 10.50.
