= NGC 1706 =

Large Spiral Galaxy in the constellation Dorado

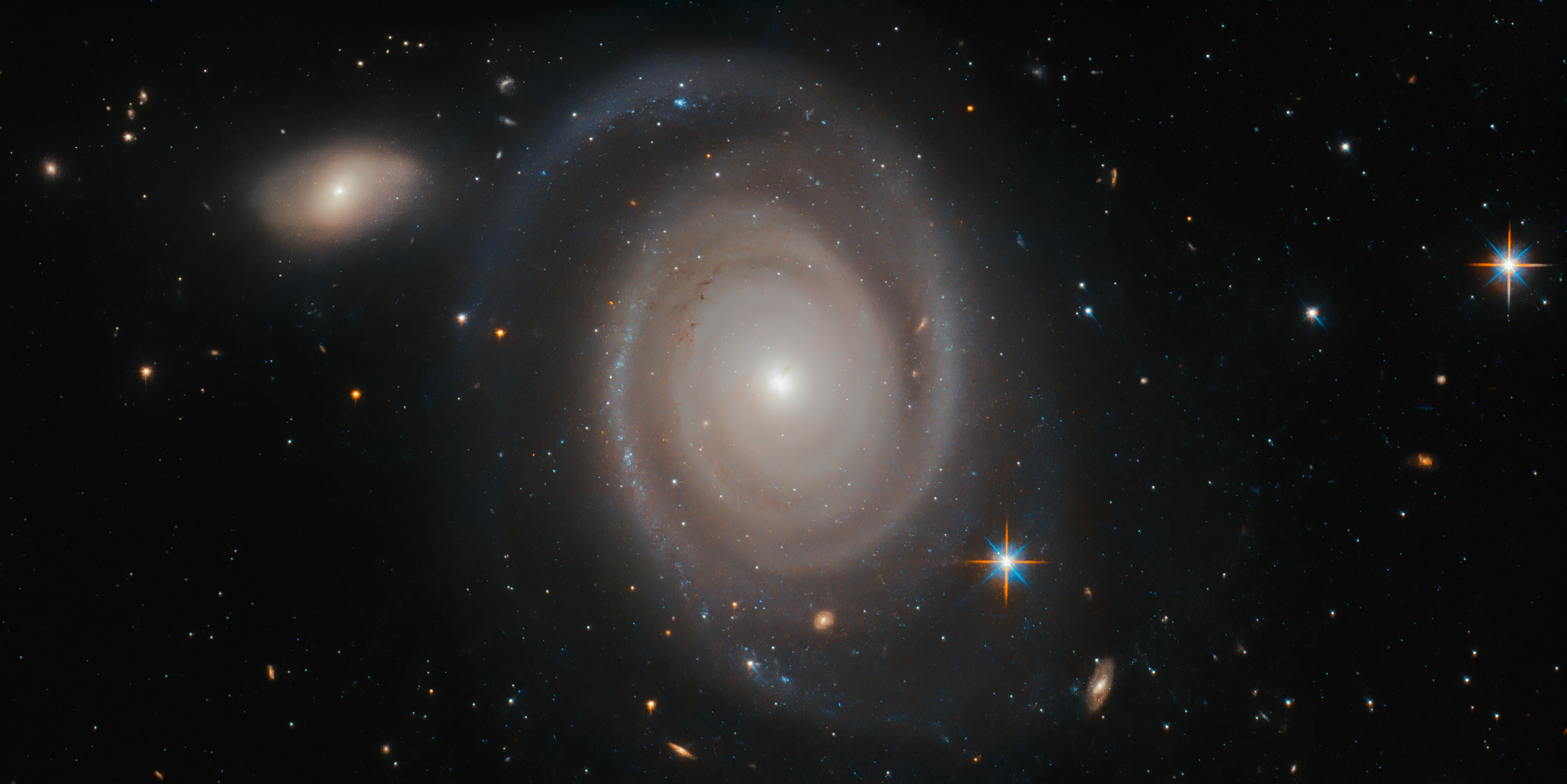
- NGC 1706 imaged by the Hubble Space Telescope

Observation data (J2000 epoch)
- Constellation: Dorado
- Right ascension: 04^{h} 52^{m} 31.0284^{s}
- Declination: −62° 59′ 08.398″
- Redshift: 0.016308±0.0000870
- Heliocentric radial velocity: 4,889±26 km/s
- Distance: 236.4 ± 16.6 Mly (72.49 ± 5.10 Mpc)
- Group or cluster: ESO 85-38 Group (LGG 125)
- Apparent magnitude (V): 13.53

Characteristics
- Type: SA(rs)ab
- Size: ~165,400 ly (50.72 kpc) (estimated)
- Apparent size (V): 1.4′ × 1.0′

Other designations
- ESO 085- G 007, 2MASX J04523101-6259089, PGC 16220

NGC 1706 is a large spiral galaxy in the constellation of Dorado. Its velocity with respect to the cosmic microwave background is 4,915±26 km/s, which corresponds to a Hubble distance of 236.4 ± 16.6 Mly (72.49 ± 5.10 Mpc). It was discovered by British astronomer John Herschel on 25 December 1837.

NGC 1706 has a possible active galactic nucleus, i.e. it has a compact region at the center of a galaxy that emits a significant amount of energy across the electromagnetic spectrum, with characteristics indicating that this luminosity is not produced by the stars.

== ESO 85-38 Group ==
NGC 1706 is a member of the ESO 85-38 Group (also known as LGG 125). The other two galaxies in the group are NGC 1771 and ESO 85-38.

== See also ==
- List of NGC objects (1001–2000)
