= NGC 1755 =

Open cluster in the constellation Dorado

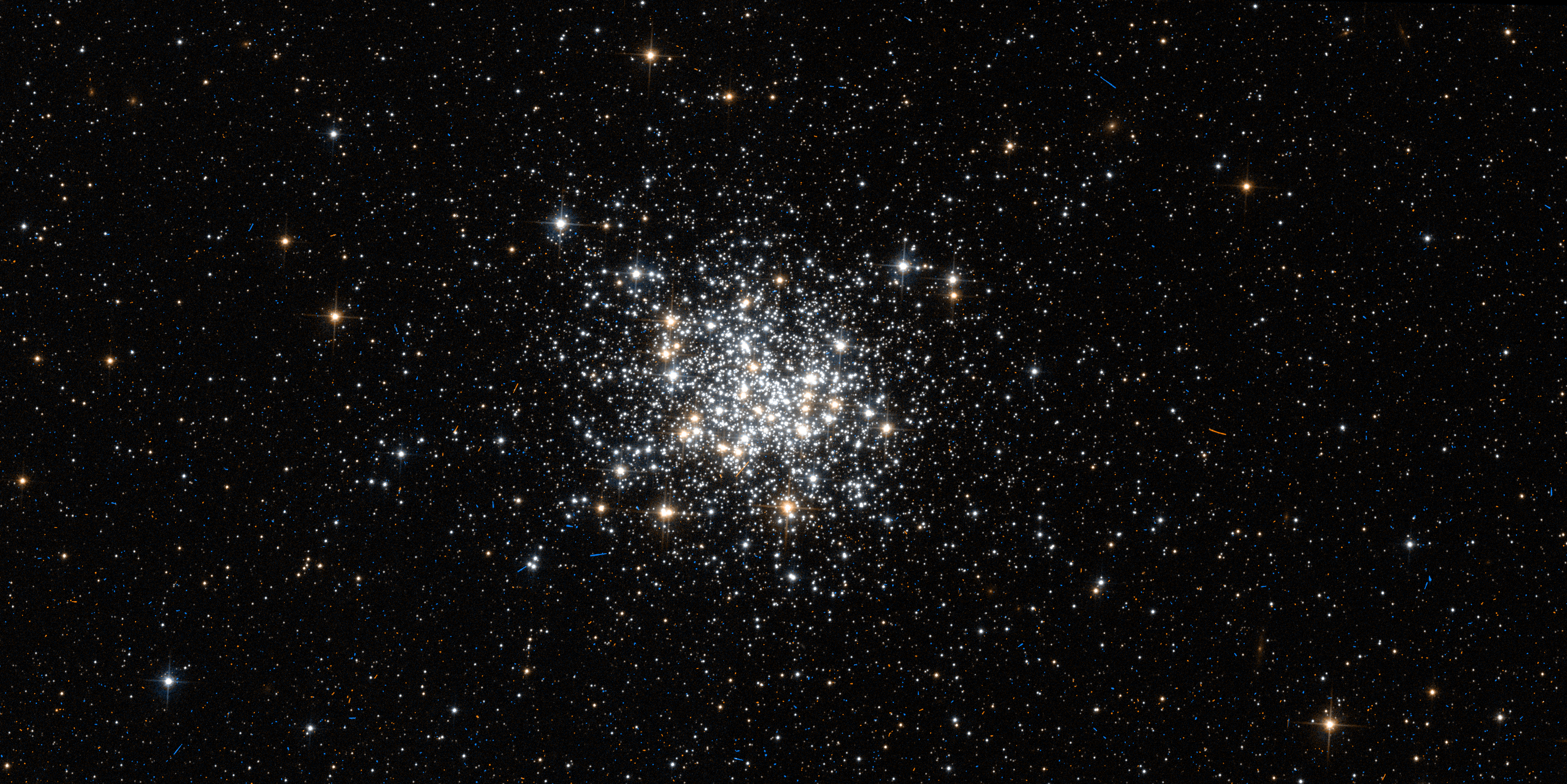
- NGC 1755 (Hubble)

Observation data (J2000 epoch)
- Right ascension: 04^{h} 55^{m} 16.390^{s}
- Declination: −68° 12′ 23.12″
- Distance: 160,000 ly (49,000 pc)
- Absolute magnitude (V): 9.9
- Apparent dimensions (V): 2.6′

Physical characteristics
- Estimated age: 80 Myr
- Other designations: ESO 56-SC28

Associations
- Constellation: Dorado

NGC 1755 (also known as ESO 56-SC28) is an open star cluster in the Large Magellanic Cloud in the constellation Dorado. It is about 120 light years across and due to its size could be a globular cluster. It has a diameter of 2.6′ and an apparent magnitude of 9.9. It was discovered by James Dunlop in 1826.
