= NGC 1820 =

Open cluster in the constellation Dorado

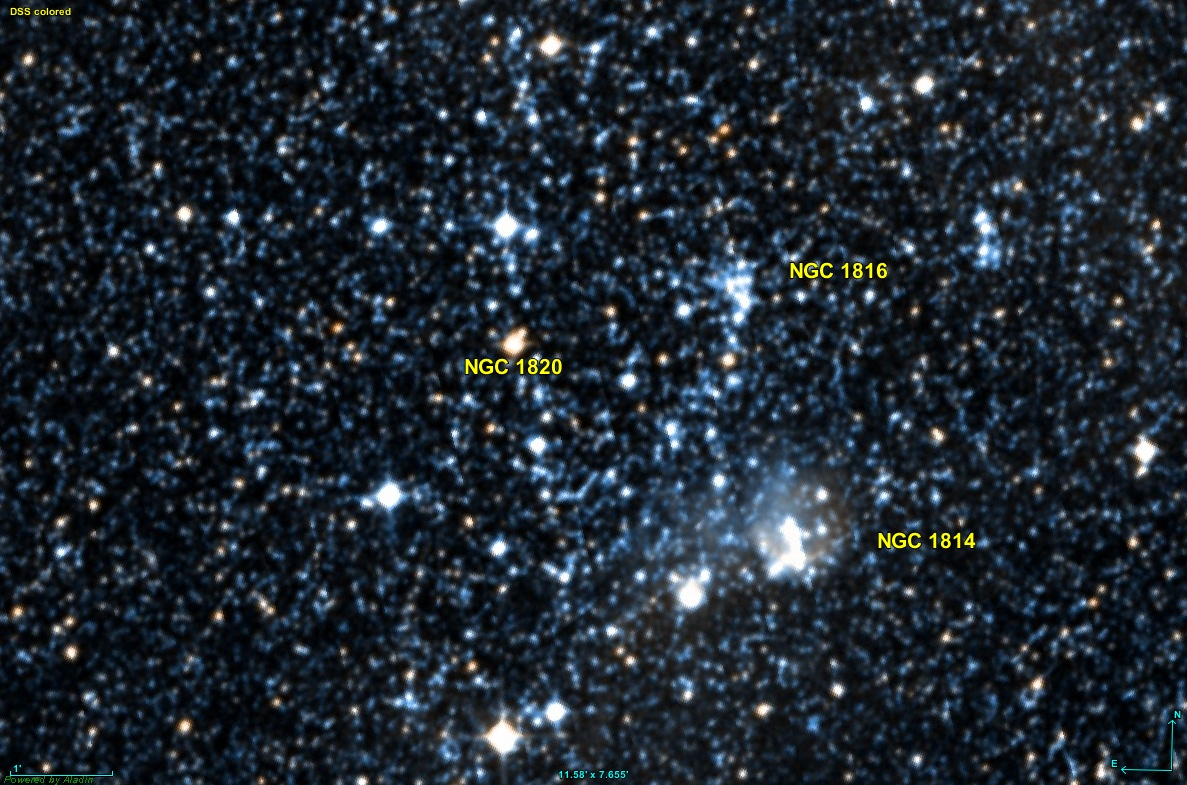
- NGC 1820 with NGC 1816 north-east of it and NGC 1814 south-east of the open cluster

Observation data (J2000 epoch)
- Right ascension: 05^{h} 04^{m} 06.0^{s}
- Declination: −67° 16′ 42″

Physical characteristics
- Other designations: ESO 85-SC39

Associations
- Constellation: Dorado

NGC 1820 (also known as ESO 85-SC39) is an open cluster in the constellation Dorado. It is located within the Large Magellanic Cloud. It has a magnitude of 9.0 and was discovered by John Herschel on 2 January 1837.
