= NGC 1929 =

Open cluster in the constellation Dorado

Nebula
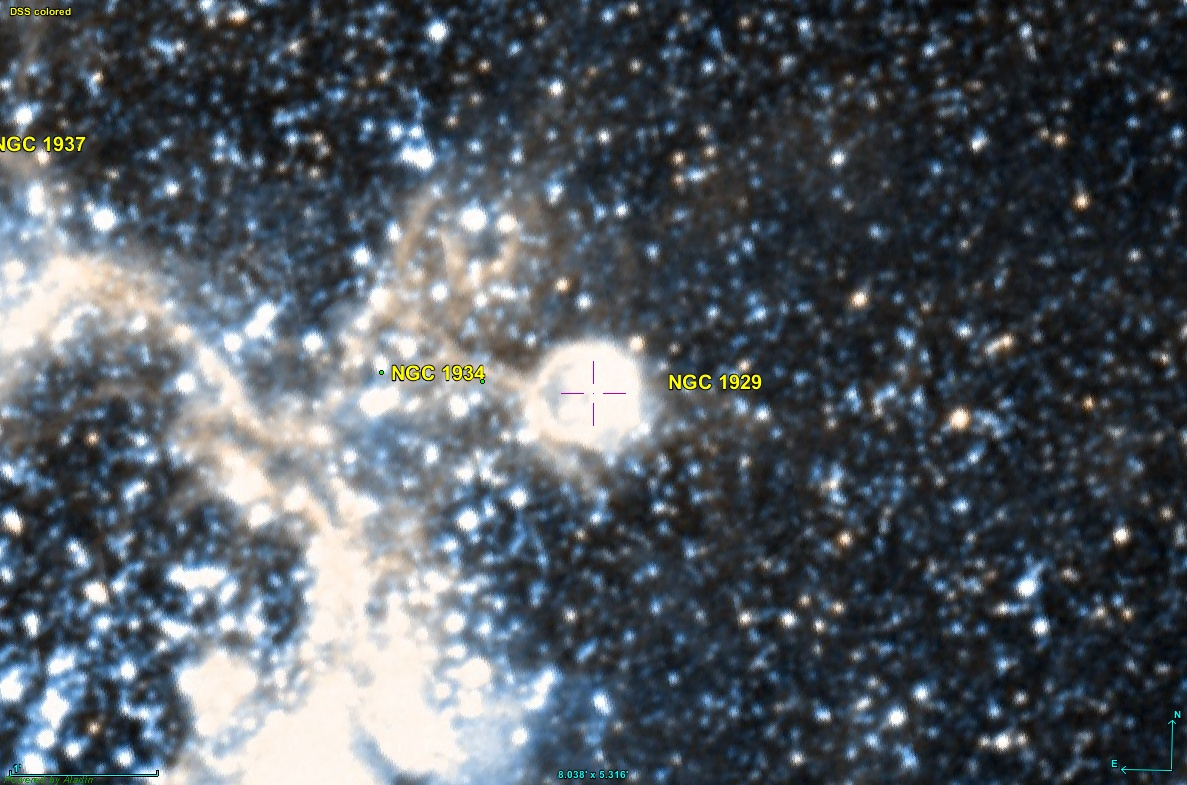
- NGC 1929, just right of centre, with NGC 1934 just to the left of the centre and NGC 1937, which is at the far top left

Observation data: epoch
- Right ascension: 05^{h} 21^{m} 37.0^{s}
- Declination: −67° 54′ 48″
- Apparent magnitude (V): 14.0
- Constellation: Dorado
- Designations: ESO 56-EN107

NGC 1929 (also known as ESO 56-EN107) is an open cluster associated with the emission nebula located within the N44 nebula in the constellation Dorado and part of the Large Magellanic Cloud. It was discovered by James Dunlop on August 3, 1826. Its apparent magnitude is 14.0, and its size is 0.8 arc minutes.
