= NGC 1854 =

Globular cluster in the constellation Dorado

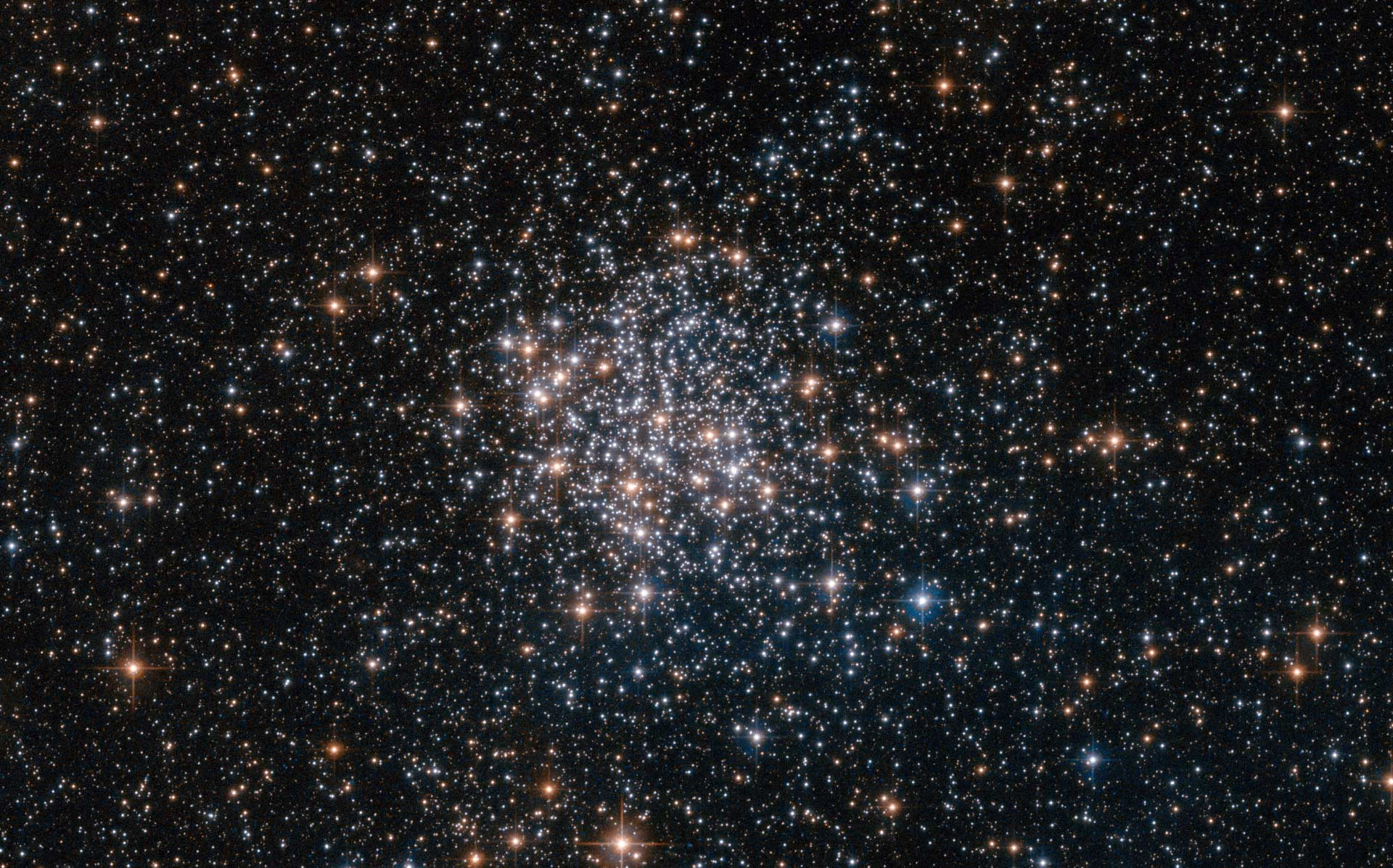
- Photograph of NGC 1854 taken by the Hubble Space Telescope

Observation data (J2000 epoch)
- Constellation: Dorado
- Right ascension: 05^{h} 09^{m} 20.10^{s}
- Declination: −68° 50′ 52.8″
- Distance: ~163000 (~50000)
- Apparent magnitude (V): 10.39
- Apparent dimensions (V): 2.3' × 2.3'

Physical characteristics
- Other designations: NGC 1855, ESO 56-72, OGLE-CL LMC 154

NGC 1854 (also known as NGC 1855) is a young globular cluster in the northern part of the central bar structure of the Large Magellanic Cloud in the constellation Dorado. At 200x magnification the cluster appears very bright, large and round, with dozens of very faint stars visible. NGC 1858, a nebula/star cluster object, lies to the south-east.

The cluster was first discovered by Scottish astronomer James Dunlop who observed it in 1826.
