= NGC 2122 =

Emission nebula in the constellation Dorado

Emission nebula
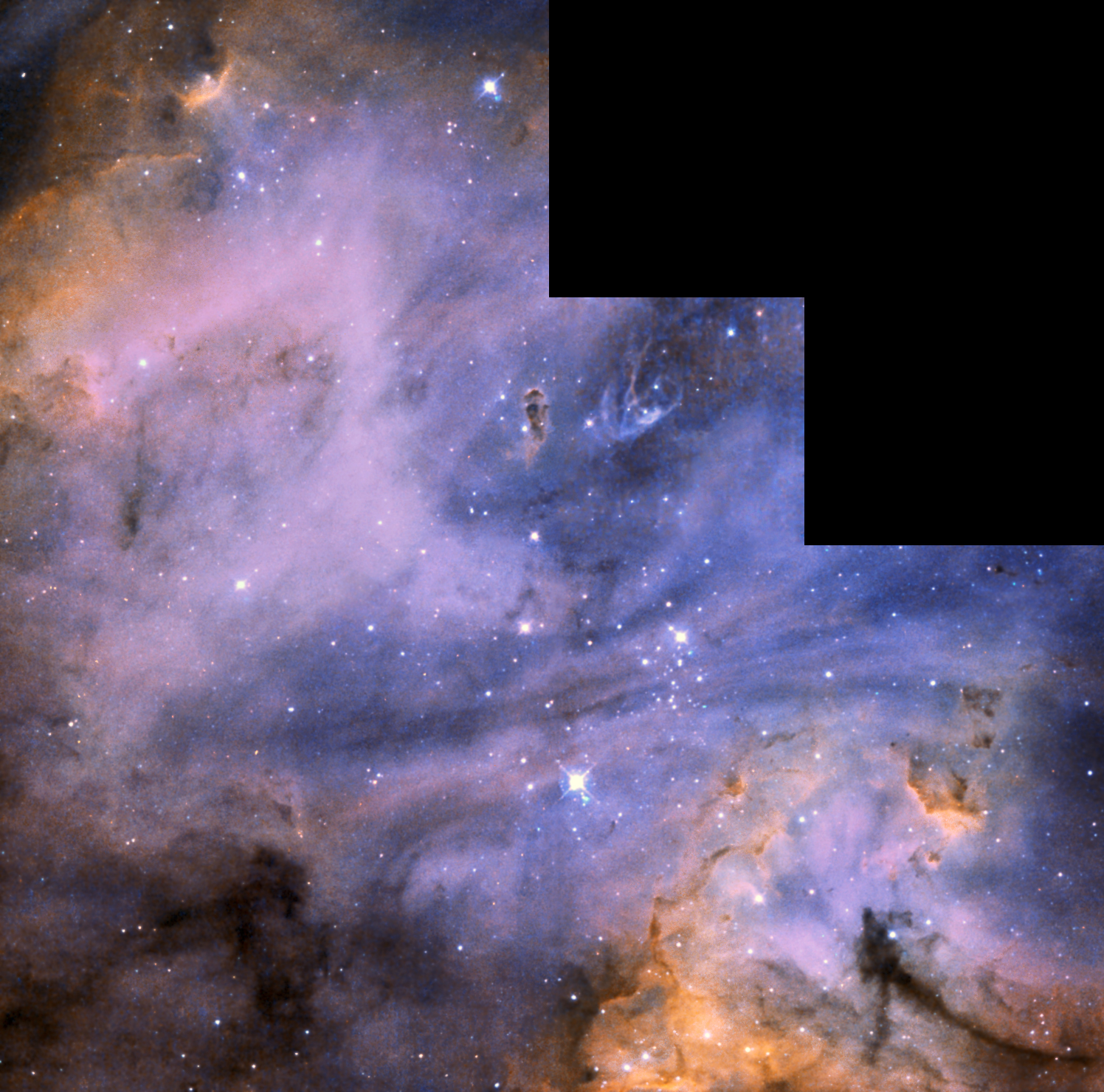
- A Hubble Space Telescope (HST) image of NGC 2122

Observation data: J2000 epoch
- Right ascension: 5^{h} 48^{m} 48.6^{s}
- Declination: −70° 42′ 52″
- Constellation: Mensa
- Designations: LMC N 180B, LHA 120-N 180B

NGC 2122, also known as N 180B (LHA 120-N 180B), is an emission nebula located in the Large Magellanic Cloud.
