= NGC 1936 =

Emission nebula in the constellation Dorado

Emission nebula
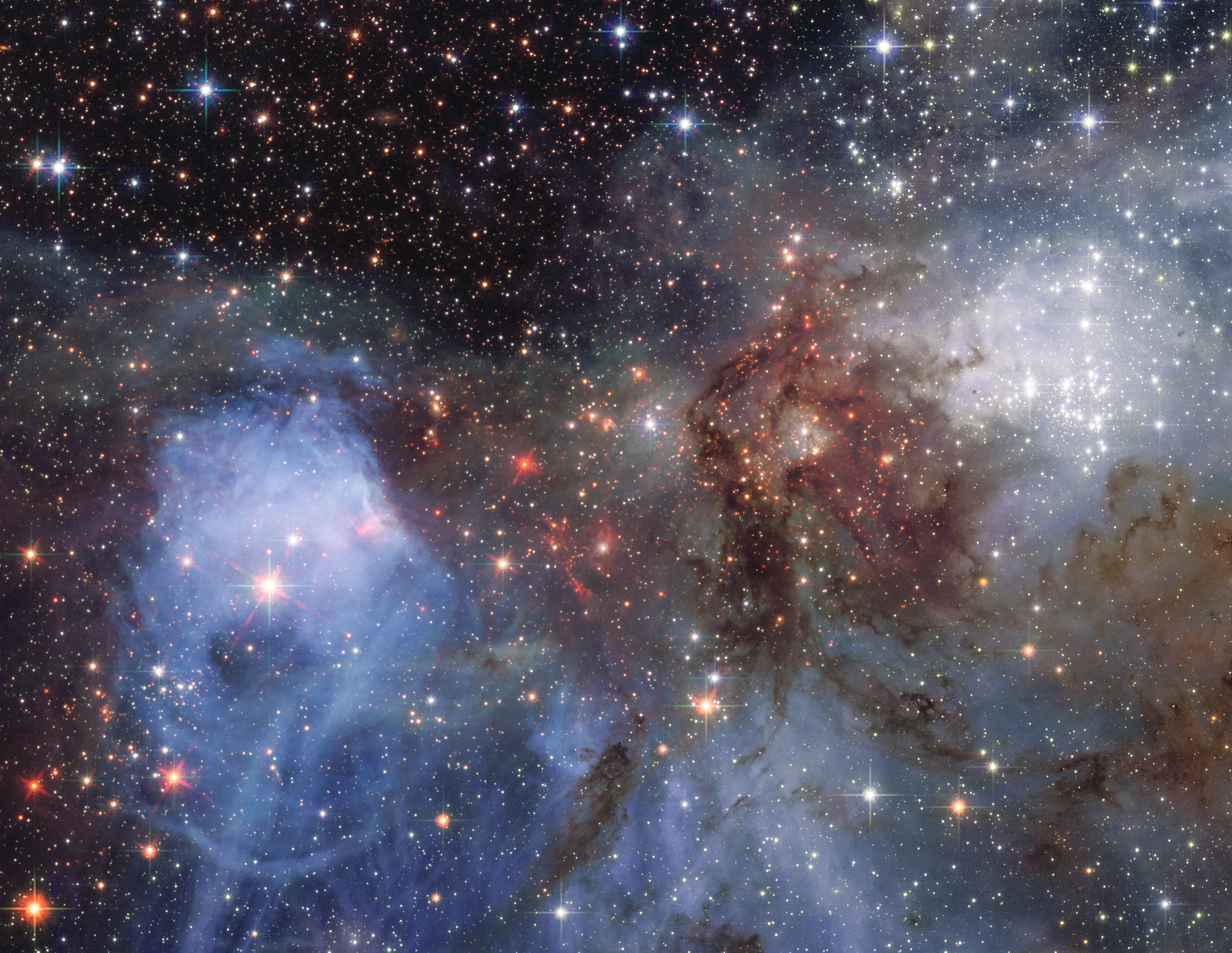
- NGC 1936, just to the left of the centre with NGC 1935, slightly to the top right of it

Observation data: epoch
- Right ascension: 05^{h} 22^{m} 11^{s}
- Declination: −67° 58′ 59″
- Apparent magnitude (V): 11.60
- Apparent dimensions (V): 12.87
- Constellation: Dorado
- Designations: GC 1142, h 2844, Dunlop 175, IC 2127, ESO 056-EN111

NGC 1936 (also known as IC 2127 and ESO 056-EN111) is an emission nebula which is part of the larger LMC-N44 nebula in the Large Magellanic Cloud. It was discovered by John Herschel in 1834 and added to the Catalogue of Nebulae and Clusters of Stars as NGC 1936. It was later observed by John Dunlop on September 27, 1936, and Williamina Fleming in 1901 and added to the Index Catalogue as IC 2127. Its apparent magnitude is 11.60.
