= Dorado =

Constellation in the southern sky

- Constellation
- List of stars in Dorado
- Abbreviation: Dor
- Genitive: Doradus
- Pronunciation: /dəˈreɪdoʊ/, genitive /dəˈreɪdəs/
- Symbolism: the dolphinfish
- Right ascension: 5^{h}
- Declination: −65°
- Quadrant: SQ1
- Area: 179 sq. deg. (72nd)
- Main stars: 3
- Bayer/Flamsteed stars: 14
- Stars brighter than 3.00^{m}: 0
- Stars within 10.00 pc (32.62 ly): 1
- Brightest star: α Dor (3.27^{m})
- Nearest star: GJ 1068
- Messier objects: 0
- Meteor showers: None
- Bordering constellations: Caelum; Horologium; Reticulum; Hydrus; Mensa; Volans; Pictor
- Visible at latitudes between +20° and −90°. Best visible at 21:00 (9 p.m.) during the month of January.

Dorado (US: /dəˈreɪdoʊ/, also UK: /-ˈrɑːdoʊ/) is a constellation in the Southern Sky. It was named in the late 16th century and is now one of the 88 modern constellations. Its name refers to the mahi-mahi (Coryphaena hippurus), which is known as dorado ("golden") in Spanish, although it has also been depicted as a swordfish. Dorado contains most of the Large Magellanic Cloud, the remainder being in the constellation Mensa. The South Ecliptic pole also lies within this constellation.

Even though the name Dorado is not Latin but Spanish, astronomers give it the Latin genitive form Doradus when naming its stars; it is treated (like the adjacent asterism Argo Navis) as a feminine proper name of Greek origin ending in -ō (like Io or Callisto or Argo), which have a genitive ending -ūs.

== History ==
Dorado was one of twelve constellations named by Petrus Plancius from the observations of Pieter Dirkszoon Keyser and Frederick de Houtman. It appeared:

- On a 35-centimetre-diameter (14 in) celestial globe published in 1597 (or 1598) in Amsterdam by Plancius with Jodocus Hondius.
- First depiction in a celestial atlas, in Johann Bayer's Uranometria of 1603.
- In Johannes Kepler's edition of Tycho Brahe's star list in the Rudolphine Tables of 1627; this was the first time that it was given the alternative name Xiphias, the swordfish. The name Dorado ultimately became dominant and was adopted by the IAU.

Dorado represents a dolphinfish; it has also been called the goldfish because Dorado are gold-colored.

== Features ==
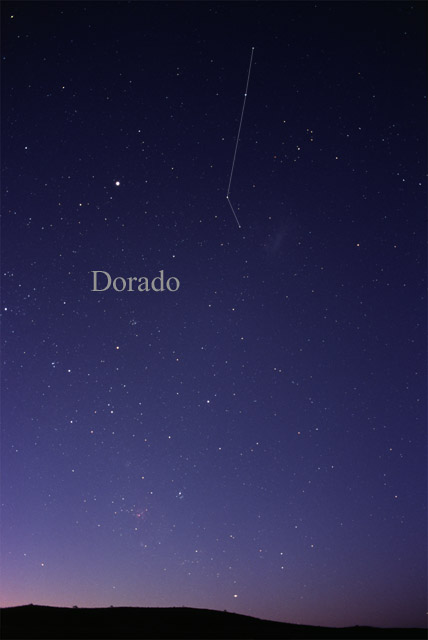
The constellation Dorado as it can be seen by the naked eye

=== Stars ===
Lacaille gave 15 stars Bayer designations Alpha through Pi in 1756, but omitted Iota, Omicron, and Xi, and labelled two stars as Eta and Pi. Mu Doradus was removed from star catalogues because of its dimness.

Alpha Doradus is a blue-white star of magnitude 3.3, 176 light-years from Earth. It is the brightest star in Dorado. Beta Doradus is a notably bright Cepheid variable star. It is a yellow-tinged supergiant star that has a minimum magnitude of 4.1 and a maximum magnitude of 3.5. One thousand and forty light-years from Earth, Beta Doradus has a period of 9 days and 20 hours.

R Doradus is one of the many variable stars in Dorado. S Dor, 9.721 hypergiant in the Large Magellanic Cloud, is the prototype of S Doradus variable stars. The variable star R Doradus 5.73 has the largest-known apparent size of any star other than the Sun. WOH G64 is a binary system in the Large Magellanic Cloud that contains the largest known star with a well defined radius at 1,540 ± 77 solar radii. Gamma Doradus is the prototype of the Gamma Doradus variable stars.

Supernova 1987A was the closest supernova to occur since the invention of the telescope. SNR 0509-67.5 is the remnant of an unusually energetic Type Ia supernova from about 400 years ago.

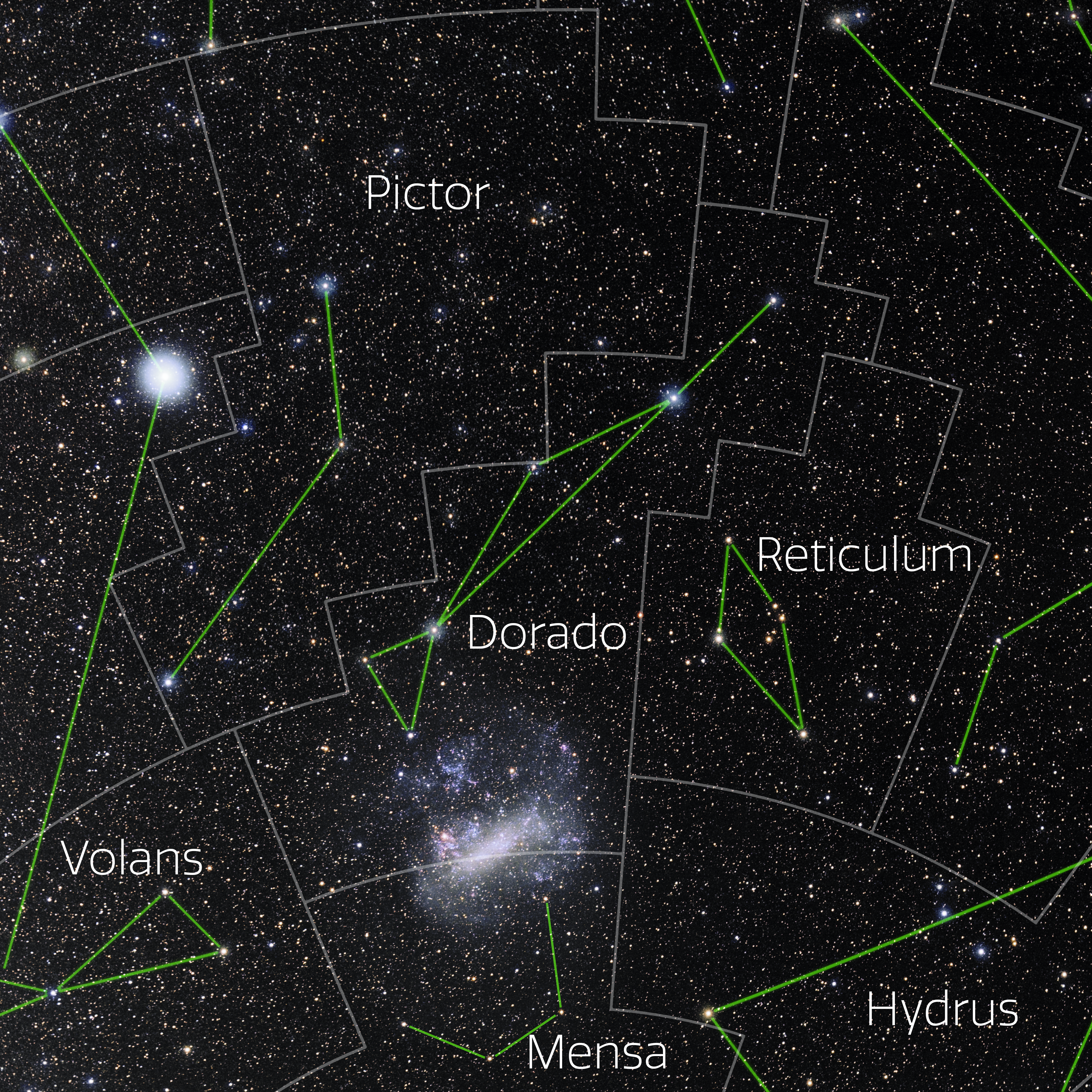
The constellation Dorado showing the IAU boundaries, the constellation stick figure, and labels for its brightest stars. Astrophotograph by Eckhard Slawik, from NOIRLab's 88 Constellations project.

HE 0437-5439 is a hypervelocity star escaping from the Milky Way/Magellanic Cloud system.

Dorado is also the location of the South Ecliptic pole, which lies near the fish's head. The pole was called "Polus Doradinalis" by Philipp von Zesen, aka Caesius.

In early 2020, the exoplanet TOI-700 d was discovered orbiting the star TOI-700 in Dorado. This is the first potentially Earth-like exoplanet to be discovered by the Transiting Exoplanet Survey Satellite.

=== Deep-sky objects ===
Because Dorado contains part of the Large Magellanic Cloud, it is rich in deep sky objects. The Large Magellanic Cloud, 25,000 light-years in diameter, is a satellite galaxy of the Milky Way Galaxy, located at a distance of 179,000 light-years. It has been deformed by its gravitational interactions with the larger Milky Way. In 1987, it became host to SN 1987A, the first supernova of 1987 and the closest since 1604. This 25,000-light-year-wide galaxy contains over 10,000 million stars. All coordinates given are for Epoch J2000.0.

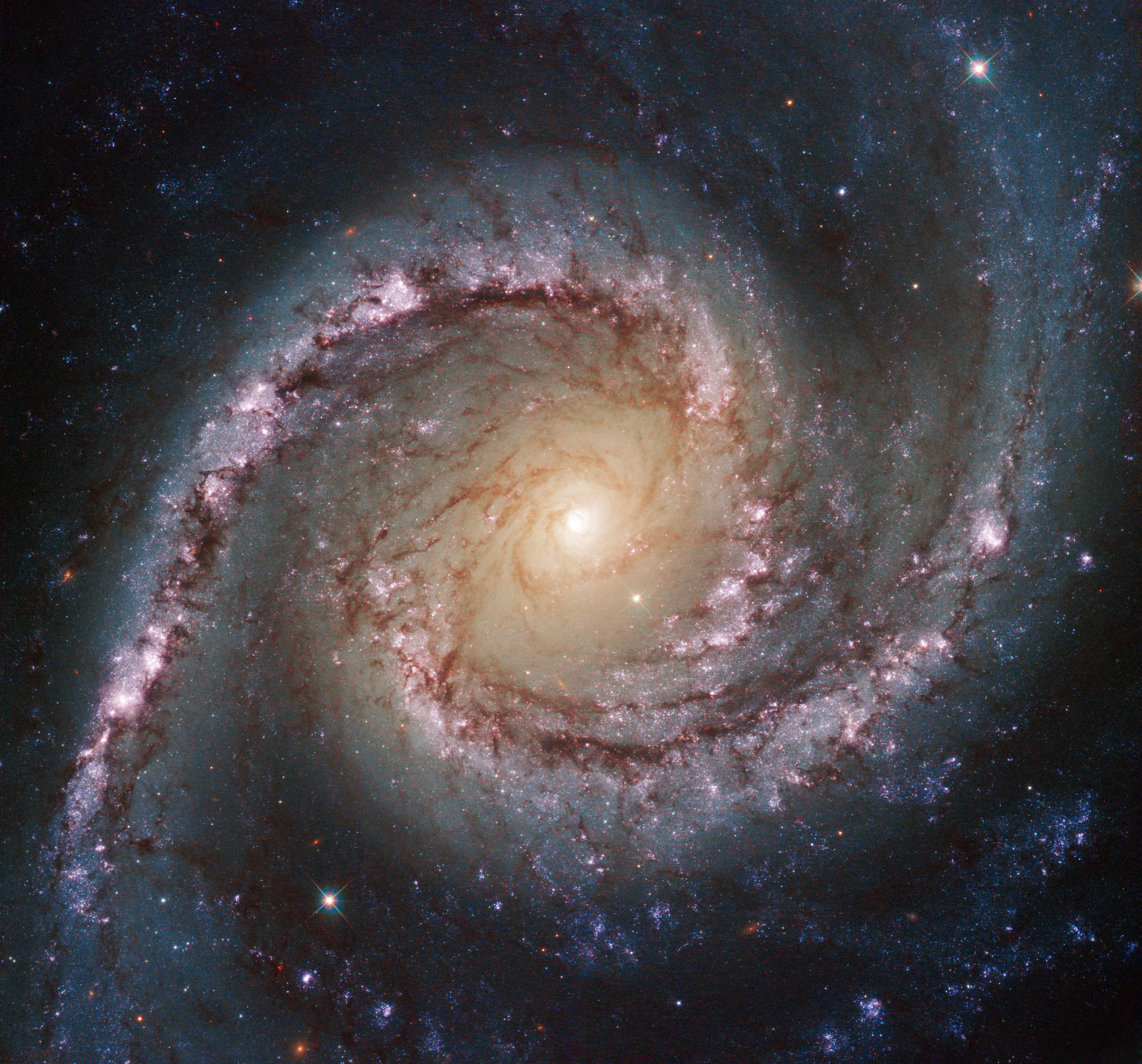
NGC 1566 is an intermediate spiral galaxy.

- N 180B is an emission nebula located in the Large Magellanic Cloud.
- NGC 1566 (RA 04h 20m 00s Dec -56° 56.3′) is a face-on spiral galaxy. It gives its name to the NGC 1566 Group of galaxies.
- NGC 1755 (RA 04h 55m 13s Dec -68° 12.2′) is a globular cluster.
- NGC 1763 (RA 04h 56m 49s Dec -68° 24.5′) is a bright nebula associated with three type B stars.
- NGC 1761 (RA 04h 56m 37s Dec -66° 28.4') is an open cluster.
- NGC 1820 (RA 05h 04m 02s Dec -67° 15.9′) is an open cluster.
- NGC 1850 (RA 05h 08m 44s Dec -68° 45.7′) is a globular cluster.
- NGC 1854 (RA 05h 09m 19s Dec -68° 50.8′) is a globular cluster.
- NGC 1869 (RA 05h 13m 56s Dec -67° 22.8′) is an open cluster.
- NGC 1901 (RA 05h 18m 15s Dec -68° 26.2′) is an open cluster.
- NGC 1910 (RA 05h 18m 43s Dec -69° 13.9′) is an open cluster.
- NGC 1936 (RA 05h 22m 14s Dec -67° 58.7′) is a bright nebula and is one of four NGC objects in close proximity, the others being NGC 1929, NGC 1934 and NGC 1935.
- NGC 1978 (RA 05h 28m 36s Dec -66° 14.0′) is an open cluster.
- NGC 2002 (RA 05h 30m 17s Dec -66° 53.1′) is an open cluster.
- NGC 2014 (RA 05h 44m 12.7s Dec −67° 42′ 57″) is a red emission nebula.
- NGC 2020 (RA 05h 44m 12.7s Dec −67° 42′ 57″) is an HII region surrounding a Wolf–Rayet star.
- NGC 2027 (RA 05h 35m 00s Dec -66° 55.0′) is an open cluster.
- NGC 2032 (RA 05h 35m 21s Dec -67° 34.1′; also known as "Seagull Nebula") is a nebula complex that contains four NGC designations: NGC 2029, NGC 2032, NGC 2035 and NGC 2040.

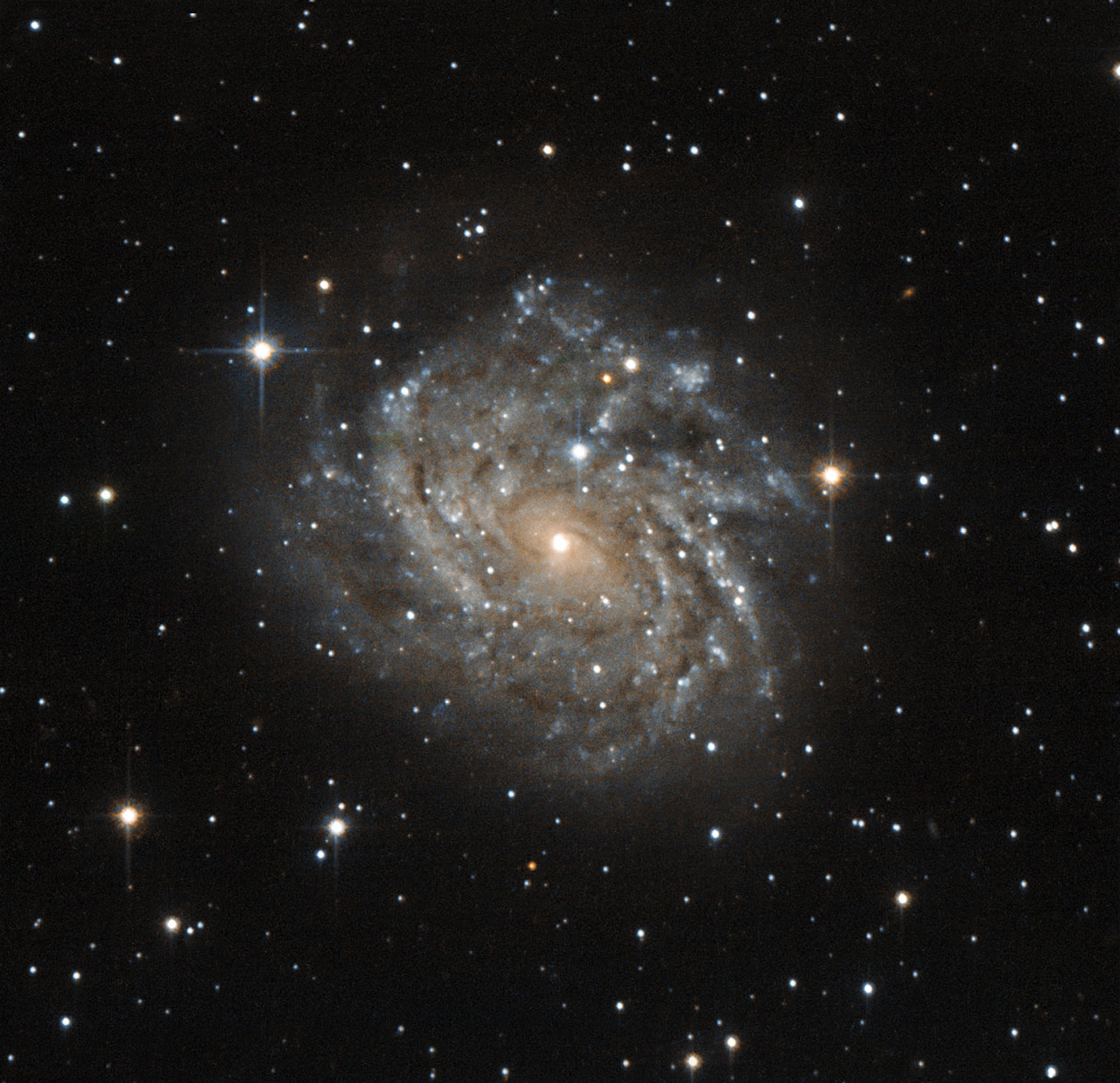
LEDA 89996 is a classic example of a spiral galaxy.

- NGC 2074 (RA 05h 39m 03.0s Dec −69° 29′ 54″) is an emission nebula.
- NGC 2078 (RA 05h 39m 54s Dec −69° 44′ 54″) is an emission nebula.
- NGC 2080, also called the "Ghost Head Nebula", is an emission nebula that is 50 light-years wide in the Large Magellanic Cloud. It is named for the two distinct white patches that it possesses, which are regions of recent star formation. The western portion is colored green from doubly ionized oxygen, the southern portion is red from hydrogen alpha emissions, and the center region is colored yellow from both oxygen and hydrogen emissions. The western white patch, A1, has one massive, recently formed star inside. The eastern patch, A2, has several stars hidden in its dust.
- Tarantula Nebula is in the Large Magellanic Cloud, named for its spiderlike shape. It is also designated 30 Doradus, as it is visible to the naked eye as a slightly out-of-focus star. Larger than any nebula in the Milky Way at 1,000 light-years in diameter, it is also brighter, because it is illuminated by the open star cluster NGC 2070, which has at its center the star cluster R136. The illuminating stars are supergiants.
- NGC 2164 (RA 05h 58m 53s Dec -68° 30.9′) is a globular cluster.
- N44 is a superbubble in the Large Magellanic Cloud that is 1,000 light-years wide. Its overall structure is shaped by the 40 hot stars towards its center. Within the superbubble of N44 is a smaller bubble catalogued as N44F. It is approximately 35 light-years in diameter and is shaped by an incredibly hot star at its center, which has a stellar wind speed of 7 million kilometers per hour. N44F also features dust columns with probable star formation hidden inside.

== Equivalents ==
In Chinese astronomy, the stars of Dorado are in two of Xu Guangqi's Southern Asterisms (近南極星區, Jìnnánjíxīngōu): the White Patches Attached (夾白, Jiābái) and the Goldfish (金魚, Jīnyú).

== Namesakes ==
- Dorado (SS-248) and Dorado (SS-526), two United States Navy submarines, were named after the same sea creature as the constellation.

== Gallery ==
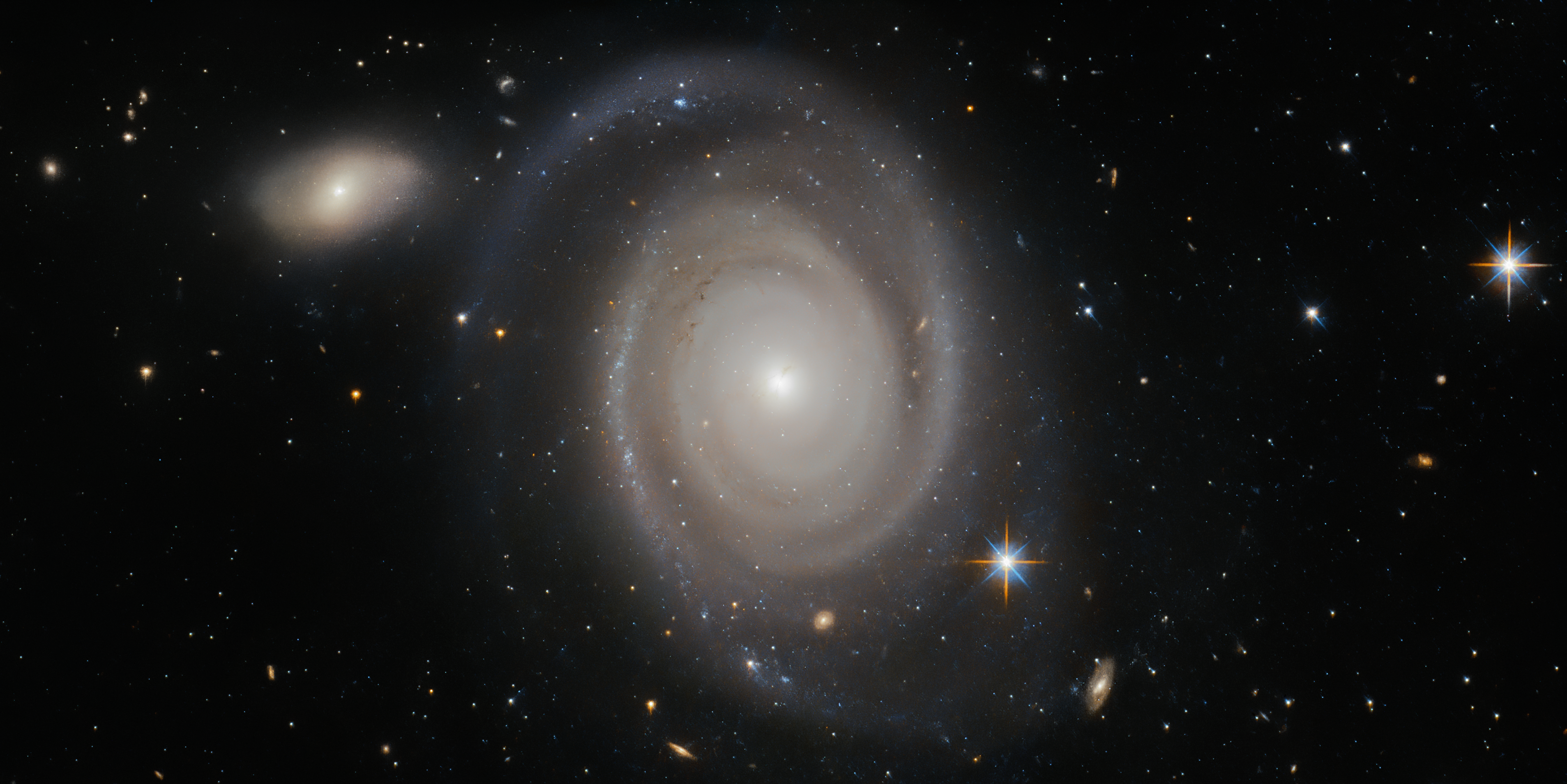
NGC 1706 is a spiral galaxy, about 230 million light-years away.

== See also ==
- Dorado in Chinese astronomy
- IAU-recognized constellations

== Sources ==
- Ridpath, Ian; Tirion, Wil (2017), Stars and Planets Guide, Collins, London, ISBN 978-0-691-17788-5
- Wilkins, Jamie; Dunn, Robert (2006), 300 Astronomical Objects: A Visual Reference to the Universe, Firefly Books, ISBN 978-1-55407-175-3
