= List of stars in Dorado =

This is the list of notable stars in the constellation Dorado, sorted by decreasing brightness.

Name	B	G.	Var	HD	HIP	RA	Dec	vis. mag.	abs. mag.	Dist. (ly)	Sp. class	Notes
α Dor	α	8		29305	21281	04^{h} 33^{m} 59.72^{s}	−55° 02′ 42.0″	3.30	−0.36	176	A0IIIp(Si)	double star; α^{2} CVn variable, V_{max} = 3.26^{m}, V_{min} = 3.30^{m}, P = 2.95 d
β Dor	β	29		37350	26069	05^{h} 33^{m} 37.52^{s}	−62° 29′ 23.5″	3.76	−3.76	1038	F4-G4Ia-II	Cepheid variable, V_{max} = 3.41^{m}, V_{min} = 4.08^{m}, P = 9.8426 d
γ Dor	γ	3		27290	19893	04^{h} 16^{m} 01.49^{s}	−51° 29′ 13.5″	4.26	2.72	66	F0V-F5V	prototype γ Dor variable, V_{max} = 4.23^{m}, V_{min} = 4.27^{m}, P = 0.7570 d
δ Dor	δ	33		39014	27100	05^{h} 44^{m} 46.42^{s}	−65° 44′ 07.9″	4.34	1.10	145	A7V	
HD 40409		36		40409	27890	05^{h} 54^{m} 05.90^{s}	−63° 05′ 27.7″	4.65	2.47	89	K1III/IV	
ζ Dor	ζ	20		33262	23693	05^{h} 05^{m} 30.69^{s}	−57° 28′ 22.8″	4.71	4.38	38	F7V	variable star, ΔV = 0.005^{m}, P = 3.49614 d
θ Dor	θ	22		34649	24372	05^{h} 13^{m} 45.43^{s}	−67° 11′ 07.3″	4.81	−1.31	546	K2III	
η^{2} Dor	η^{2}	40		43455	29353	06^{h} 11^{m} 15.02^{s}	−65° 35′ 22.9″	5.01	−1.56	671	M2.5III	semiregular variable, V_{max} = 4.94^{m}, V_{min} = 5.09^{m}
ν Dor	ν	39		43107	29134	06^{h} 08^{m} 44.34^{s}	−68° 50′ 36.4″	5.06	0.42	277	B8V	
ε Dor	ε	34		39844	27534	05^{h} 49^{m} 53.55^{s}	−66° 54′ 04.4″	5.10	−0.88	512	B6V	suspected variable
λ Dor	λ	23		36189	25429	05^{h} 26^{m} 19.28^{s}	−58° 54′ 45.4″	5.14	−0.64	467	G6III	
WZ Dor		21	WZ	33684	23840	05^{h} 07^{m} 34.01^{s}	−63° 23′ 58.5″	5.19	−1.23	627	M3III	semiregular variable, ΔV = 0.12^{m}, P = 40 d
κ Dor	κ	12		30478	22040	04^{h} 44^{m} 21.12^{s}	−59° 43′ 58.2″	5.28	1.11	222	A8/A9III/IV	suspected δ Sct variable, ΔV = 0.03^{m}
G Dor	G	28		37297	26001	05^{h} 32^{m} 59.52^{s}	−64° 13′ 39.1″	5.34	1.08	232	G8/K0III	spectroscopic binary
π^{2} Dor	π^{2}	42		46116	30565	06^{h} 25^{m} 28.65^{s}	−69° 41′ 26.8″	5.37	0.81	266	G8III	
π^{1} Dor	π^{1}	38		45669	30321	06^{h} 22^{m} 38.23^{s}	−69° 59′ 02.9″	5.56	−0.75	595	K5III	
R Dor	P	9	R	29712	21479	04^{h} 36^{m} 45.68^{s}	−62° 04′ 37.1″	5.59	1.61	203	M8IIIe	semiregular variable, V_{max} = 4.78^{m}, V_{min} = 6.32^{m}, P = 172 d
η^{1} Dor	η^{1}	41		42525	28909	06^{h} 06^{m} 09.36^{s}	−66° 02′ 22.9″	5.72	0.68	332	A0V	
HD 36584		24		36584	25482	05^{h} 26^{m} 59.82^{s}	−68° 37′ 21.0″	6.02	1.62	248	F0IV/V	double star
HD 27604		4		27604	20109	04^{h} 18^{m} 39.98^{s}	−52° 51′ 37.0″	6.08	1.73	242	A8V+...	double star
HD 31746		18		31746	22844	04^{h} 54^{m} 52.92^{s}	−58° 32′ 52.1″	6.11	3.66	101	F3V	
HD 36876		27		36876	25781	05^{h} 30^{m} 15.87^{s}	−63° 55′ 40.2″	6.19	0.75	400	F0IV	double star
HD 28255		6		28255	20552	04^{h} 24^{m} 12.32^{s}	−57° 04′ 16.2″	6.28	4.12	88	G4V+...	triple star
HR 1960		31	AZ	37935	26368	05^{h} 36^{m} 54.99^{s}	−66° 33′ 37.1″	6.28	−0.82	856	B9.5V	Be star, V_{max} = 6.26^{m}, V_{min} = 6.29^{m}, P = 395.48 d
HD 46730		43		46730	30973	06^{h} 30^{m} 03.01^{s}	−65° 34′ 06.2″	6.28	1.34	317	F0III	variable star, ΔV = 0.008^{m}, P = 0.10133 d
HD 37501		30		37501	26190	05^{h} 34^{m} 57.44^{s}	−61° 10′ 33.5″	6.32	1.18	348	G5IV	
HD 39963		35		39963	27660	05^{h} 51^{m} 23.10^{s}	−64° 02′ 01.0″	6.35	−1.32	1116	G8III	
HD 31754	(γ)	19		31754	22737	04^{h} 53^{m} 30.49^{s}	−66° 40′ 31.6″	6.43	−1.30	1148	M0/M1III	semiregular variable, V_{max} = 6.39^{m}, V_{min} = 6.43^{m}
HD 24863		1		24863	18275	03^{h} 54^{m} 33.94^{s}	−52° 41′ 25.2″	6.46	1.31	349	A4V	suspected variable, V_{max} = 6.40^{m}, V_{min} = 6.47^{m}
HD 30610		13		30610	22081	04^{h} 44^{m} 57.91^{s}	−63° 13′ 46.9″	6.46	0.73	456	K0/K1III	suspected variable, V_{max} = 6.45^{m}, V_{min} = 6.48^{m}
XY Dor		2	XY	25470	18691	04^{h} 00^{m} 15.53^{s}	−51° 33′ 53.9″	6.52		1250	M1III	semiregular variable, ΔV = 0.07^{m}
XZ Dor			XZ	31009	22381	04^{h} 49^{m} 04.75^{s}	−56° 39′ 59.7″	6.55		1450	M2III	slow irregular variable, ΔV = 0.16^{m}
AB Dor			AB	36705	25647	05^{h} 28^{m} 44.83^{s}	−65° 26′ 54.9″	7.00		49	K0V	triple-star system; T Tau star, V_{max} = 6.74^{m}, V_{min} = 7.12^{m}, P = 0.5139 d; member of the AB Doradus moving group
HD 28254				28254	20606	04^{h} 24^{m} 50.71^{s}	−50° 37′ 19.9″	7.71	3.96	183	G5V	has a planet (b)
HD 30177				30177	21850	04^{h} 41^{m} 54.37^{s}	−58° 01′ 14.7″	8.41		179	G8V	has two planets (b and c)
HD 33579				33579	23718	05^{h} 05^{m} 55.51^{s}	−67° 53′ 10.9″	9.14		160000	A4Ia	in LMC; yellow hypergiant
S Dor			S	35343		05^{h} 18^{m} 14.3^{s}	−69° 14′ 59″	9.72			A0-5eq	in LMC; prototype luminous blue variable, V_{max} = 8.8^{m}, V_{min} = 10.83^{m}; one of the most luminous stars known
WASP-62						05^{h} 48^{m} 34.0^{s}	−63° 59′ 18″	10.3		1566	F7	Naledi; has a transiting planet (b)
HD 38282				38282		05^{h} 38^{m} 53.39^{s}	−69° 02′ 00.9″	10.50		160000	WN5-6h+WN6-6h	in LMC; Wolf–Rayet binary; both components among the most luminous stars known
HD 37974				37974		05^{h} 36^{m} 25.84^{s}	−69° 22′ 55.9″	10.96		160000	Be	in LMC; blue hypergiant; α Cyg variable, V_{max} = 10.85^{m}, V_{min} = 11.0^{m}, one of the most luminous stars known
Melnick 42						05^{h} 38^{m} 42.13^{s}	−69° 05′ 55.3″	10.96		160000	O3If/WN	in LMC; one of the most luminous stars known
AA Dor			AA	269696		05^{h} 31^{m} 40.35^{s}	−69° 53′ 02.2″	11.14			sdB+dM	Algol variable, V_{max} = 11.13^{m}, V_{min} = 11.6^{m}, P = 0.2615398 d
RW Dor			RW	269320	24763	05^{h} 18^{m} 32.54^{s}	−68° 13′ 32.8″	11.16		307.5	G4/5V	W UMa variable, ΔV = 0.454^{m}, P = 0.285463 d
R99				269445		05^{h} 22^{m} 59.80^{s}	−68° 01′ 46.6″	11.46		160000	Bep	in LMC; luminous blue variable, one of the most luminous stars known
HD 36402				36402		05^{h} 26^{m} 03.94^{s}	−67° 29′ 57.0″	11.62		160000	WC4+O8I	in LMC; Wolf–Rayet star
HV 883						05^{h} 00^{m} 07.51^{s}	−68° 27′ 00.2″	11.63		160000	G2:Iabv...	in LMC; Cepheid variable, V_{max} = 11.55^{m}, V_{min} = 12.85^{m}, P = 133.45 d
HD 34664				34664		05^{h} 13^{m} 52.99^{s}	−67° 26′ 54.9″	11.70		160000	B0Iab:e	in LMC; Be star
Gliese 163					19394	04^{h} 09^{m} 15.66^{s}	−53° 22′ 25.3″	11.81		48.88	M3.5	has 3 planets
R139						05^{h} 38^{m} 42.35^{s}	−69° 04′ 58.1″	11.97		160000	O7Iap	in LMC; one of the most luminous stars known
Brey 75						05^{h} 38^{m} 40.53^{s}	−67° 05′ 57.2″	12.02		160000	WN6h	in LMC; Wolf–Rayet star; one of the most luminous stars known
R84				269227		05^{h} 13^{m} 54.27^{s}	−69° 31′ 46.7″	12.04		160000	WN9h	in LMC; Wolf–Rayet star
HD 38489				38489		05^{h} 40^{m} 13.33^{s}	−69° 22′ 46.5″	12.22		160000	B[e]	in LMC; Be star
HD 269810				269810		05^{h} 35^{m} 13.91^{s}	−67° 33′ 27.5″	12.28		160000	OB	in LMC; one of the most luminous and most massive stars known
BAT99-104						05^{h} 38^{m} 41.88^{s}	−69° 06′ 13.7″	12.5		160000	WN	in LMC; Wolf–Rayet star; one of the most luminous stars known
R136a1						05^{h} 38^{m} 42.43^{s}	−69° 06′ 02.2″	12.77		160000	WN5h	in R136; most massive and most luminous star known as of 2014
R136c						05^{h} 38^{m} 42.92^{s}	−69° 06′ 04.9″	12.86		160000	WN5h	in R136; one of the most massive and most luminous stars known
R136a3						05^{h} 38^{m} 42.29^{s}	−69° 06′ 03.5″	12.93		160000	Wn5h	in R136; one of the most massive and most luminous stars known
HD 38344				38344		05^{h} 39^{m} 11.32^{s}	−69° 02′ 01.4″	13.07		160000	WR:	in LMC; Wolf–Rayet star; one of the most luminous stars known
LH54-425						05^{h} 26^{m} 24.25^{s}	−67° 30′ 17.2″	13.1		160000	O3IIIf+O6v	in LMC
BE 381						05^{h} 35^{m} 54.37^{s}	−67° 59′ 07.9″	13.27		160000	WN9h	in LMC; Wolf–Rayet star
R136a2						05^{h} 36^{m} 42.45^{s}	−69° 06′ 02.2″	13.38		160000	Wn5h	in R136; one of the most massive and most luminous stars known
BAT99-116						05^{h} 38^{m} 44.25^{s}	−69° 06′ 05.8″	13.5		160000	WN...	in LMC; high-mass X-ray binary; companion star is one of the most luminous stars known
MACHO 80.7443.1718						05^{h} 26^{m} 24.46^{s}	−68° 47′ 04.94″	13.63		160000	B0Iae+O9.5V	in LMC; most extreme heartbeat star known
R136b						05^{h} 38^{m} 42.77^{s}	−69° 06′ 03.4″	13.66		160000	WN9ha	in R136; Wolf–Rayet star
R136a5						05^{h} 38^{m} 42.47^{s}	−69° 06′ 02.0″	13.73		160000	O3Iab:	in R136; one of the most massive and most luminous stars known
A0538-66						05^{h} 35^{m} 41.01^{s}	−66° 51′ 53.5″	13.8		160000	B0.5IIIe	in LMC; high-mass X-ray binary
BI 253						05^{h} 37^{m} 34.46^{s}	−69° 01′ 10.2″	13.88		160000	O2V(f*)	in LMC; O2 spectral type standard; runaway star
LMC X-4						05^{h} 32^{m} 49.54^{s}	−66° 22′ 13.3″	14.0		160000	O8III	in LMC; high-mass X-ray binary
BAT99-68						05^{h} 35^{m} 42.22^{s}	−69° 11′ 54.24″	14.13		160000	O3If*/WN6	in LMC; Wolf–Rayet binary; one of the most luminous stars known
BB Dor			BB			05^{h} 29^{m} 28.66^{s}	−58° 54′ 46.5″	14.3				VY Scl variable, V_{max} = 14.3^{m}, V_{min} = 19.3^{m}, P = 0.154095 d
R127				269858		05^{h} 36^{m} 43.69^{s}	−69° 29′ 47.5″	14.5		160000	O8(f)p	in LMC; luminous blue variable
LMC X-1						05^{h} 39^{m} 38.84^{s}	−69° 44′ 35.7″	14.5		160000	O8(f)p	in LMC; high-mass X-ray binary
HD 269908				269908		05^{h} 38^{m} 27.70^{s}	−68° 28′ 58.5″	14.71		160000	WR	in LMC; Wolf–Rayet star; one of the most luminous stars known
BAT99-66						05^{h} 35^{m} 29.81^{s}	−67° 06′ 49.4″	15.36		160000	WR:	in LMC; Wolf–Rayet star; one of the most luminous stars known
VFTS 102						05^{h} 37^{m} 39.25^{s}	−69° 05′ 51.04″	15.81		160000	Omp+...	in LMC; fastest-rotating known star
VFTS 682						05^{h} 38^{m} 59.53^{s}	−69° 04′ 26.72″	16.08		160000	WN5h	in LMC; one of the most massive and most luminous stars known
HE 0437-5439						04^{h} 38^{m} 12.77^{s}	−54° 33′ 11.9″	16.3		200000	BV	hypervelocity star
LMC X-3						05^{h} 38^{m} 56.30^{s}	−64° 05′ 03.0″	17.2		160000	B2.5Ve	in LMC; high-mass X-ray binary
WOH G64						04^{h} 55^{m} 10.48^{s}	−68° 20′ 29.8″	18.46		160000	M7.5	in LMC; one of the largest known stars
CAL-83						05^{h} 43^{m} 34.5^{s}	−68° 22′ 18″			160000		in LMC; X-ray binary
PSR B0540-69						05^{h} 40^{m} 11.16^{s}	−69° 19′ 53.9″			160000	O8(f)p	in LMC; pulsar
PSR J0537-6910						05^{h} 37^{m} 47.42^{s}	−69° 10′ 19.9″			160000	O8(f)p	in LMC; pulsar
SGR 0525-66						05^{h} 26^{m} 00.7^{s}	−66° 04′ 35″			160000		in LMC; soft gamma repeater
Table legend: • Name = Proper name • B = Bayer designation • F or/and G. = Flamsteed designation or Gould designation • Var = Variable star designation • HD = Henry Draper Catalogue designation number • HIP = Hipparcos Catalogue designation number • RA = Right ascension for the Epoch/Equinox J2000.0 • Dec = Declination for the Epoch/Equinox J2000.0 • vis. mag. = visual magnitude (m or m_{v}), also known as apparent magnitude • abs. mag. = absolute magnitude (M_{v}) • Dist. (ly) = Distance in light-years from Earth • Sp. class = Spectral class of the star in the stellar classification system • Notes = Common name(s) or alternate name(s); comments; notable properties [for example: multiple star status, range of variability if it is a variable star, exoplanets, etc.]

== See also ==
- Lists of stars by constellation
