= HD 269810 =

Star in the constellation Dorado

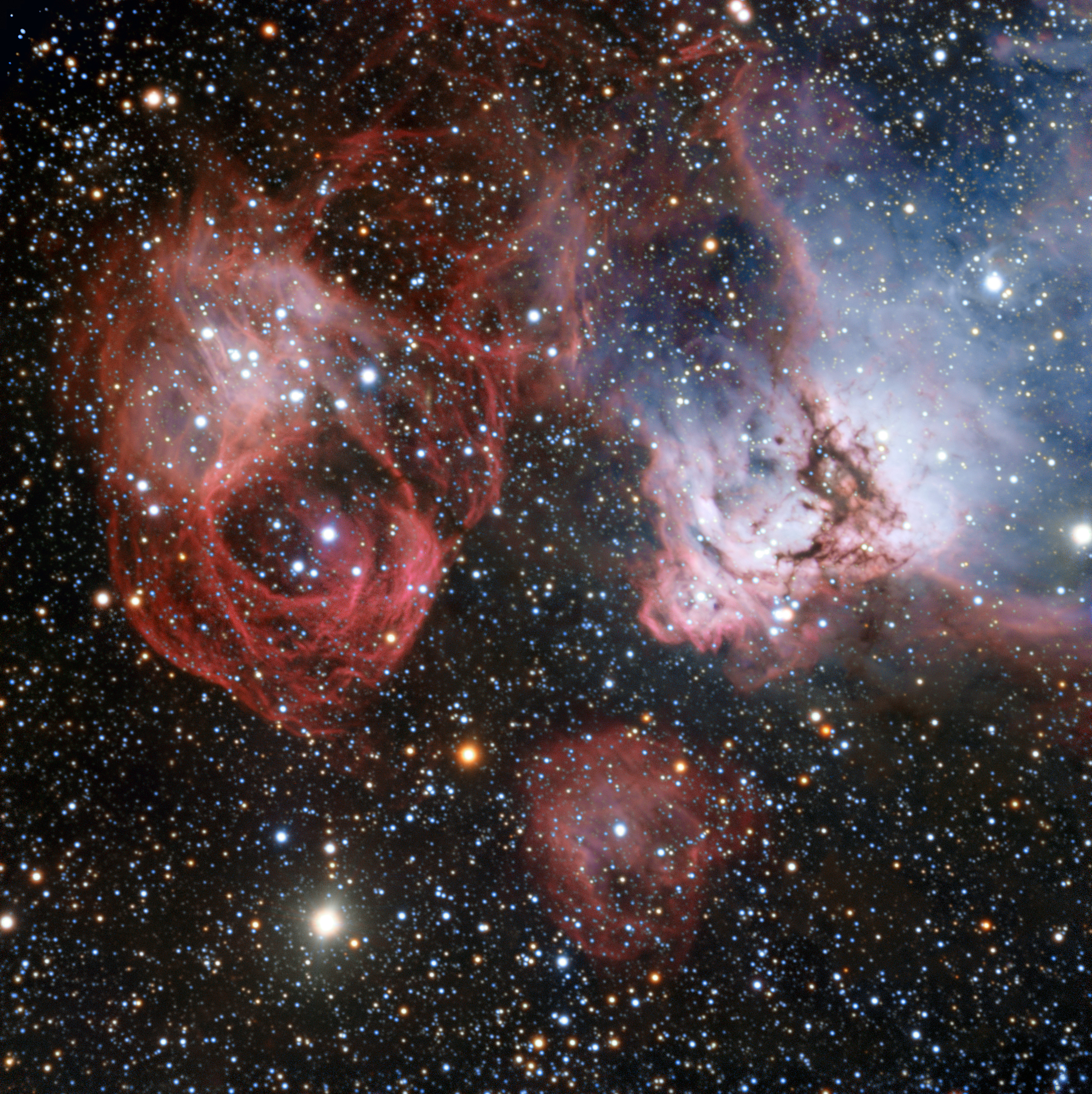
- A VLT image of NGC 2040, NGC 2035, and NGC 2032, with HD 269810 circled in red

Observation data Epoch J2000 Equinox ICRS
- Constellation: Dorado
- Right ascension: 05^{h} 35^{m} 13.90^{s}
- Declination: −67° 33′ 27.5″
- Apparent magnitude (V): 12.22

Characteristics
- Spectral type: O2III(f^{*})
- B−V color index: −0.14

Astrometry
Radial velocity (R_{v})	303 km/s
Proper motion (μ)	RA: +1.801 mas/yr Dec.: +0.677 mas/yr
Parallax (π)	−0.0098±0.0310 mas
Distance	49,000 pc
Absolute magnitude (M_{V})	−6.6

Details
Mass	130 M_{☉}
Radius	18 R_{☉}
Luminosity	2.2 million L_{☉}
Surface gravity (log g)	4.0 cgs
Temperature	52,500 K
Metallicity	≤0.1 He/H
Rotational velocity (v sin i)	173 km/s

Other designations
- GCRV 24403, RMC 122, UBV 5767, ARDB C54, SK −67° 211, UCAC2 2218036, ARDB 317, GSC 09162-00101, TYC 9162-101-1, CSI−67-05351, 2MASS J05351389-6733275, UBV M 28781

Database references
SIMBAD	data

HD 269810 is a blue giant star in the Large Magellanic Cloud. It is one of the most massive and most luminous stars known, and one of only a handful of stars with the spectral type O2. The star's name, HD 269810, comes from the Henry Draper Catalogue. The serial number 269810 indicates it was published in the extension of the catalogue and is formally referred to as HDE 269810.

== Properties ==
HD 269810 is classified as an O2 III (f^{*}) star with a temperature of 52,500 K. The luminosity class of III indicates a star somewhat evolved and expanded compared to the zero-age main sequence. The spectral peculiarity code (f^{*}) indicates strong Niii emission lines, even stronger Niv emission, and weak Heii emission. The star's radius is 18 R_{☉}, but because of its high surface temperature it is two million times brighter than the Sun. The high temperature generates a fast stellar wind of 3,750 km/s (2,330 mi/s), shedding over a millionth of the mass of the sun each year. In 1995, HD 269810 was estimated to be 190 times the mass of the Sun and was thought to be the heaviest star known, but its mass estimate is now revised down to be around 130 M_{☉}.

Stars as massive as HD 269810 with metallicity typical of the Large Magellanic Cloud will maintain near-homogeneous chemical structure due to strong convection and rotational mixing. This produces strong helium and nitrogen surface abundance enhancement even during core hydrogen burning. Their rotation rates will also decrease significantly due to mass loss and envelope inflation, so that gamma-ray bursts are unlikely when this type of star reaches core collapse. They are expected to develop directly into Wolf–Rayet stars, passing through WN, WC, and WO stages before exploding as a type Ic supernova and leaving behind a black hole. The total lifetime would be around 2 million years, showing an O-type spectrum for most of that time before a shorter period with a WR spectrum.
