= Pi Doradus =

The Bayer designation Pi Doradus (π Dor / π Doradus) is shared by two stars in the constellation Dorado:

- π^{1} Doradus, a red giant star.
- π^{2} Doradus, a red clump giant star.
