= WR 21a =

Star in the constellation Carina

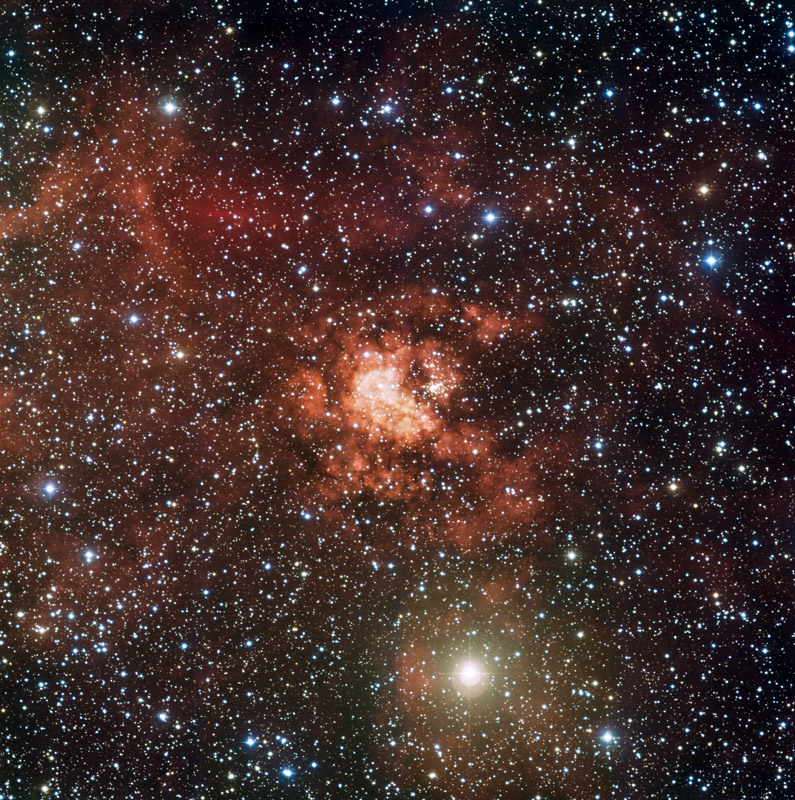
- Location of WR 21a (circled) near RCW 49; Credit: ESO

Observation data Epoch J2000 Equinox ICRS
- Constellation: Carina
- Right ascension: 10^{h} 25^{m} 56.502^{s}
- Declination: −57° 48′ 43.52″
- Apparent magnitude (V): 12.661

Characteristics
- Evolutionary stage: main sequence + main sequence
- Spectral type: O3/WN5ha + O3Vz((f*))
- B−V color index: +1.507
- Variable type: Eclipsing

Astrometry
| Proper motion (μ) | RA: −4.079 mas/yr Dec.: 2.617 mas/yr |
| Parallax (π) | 0.2497±0.0143 mas |
| Distance | 13,100 ± 700 ly (4,000 ± 200 pc) |
| Absolute magnitude (M_{V}) | −7.20 |

Orbit
| Primary | WR |
| Name | O |
| Period (P) | 31.67855±0.00002 days |
| Semi-major axis (a) | 230 R_{☉} |
| Eccentricity (e) | 0.695±0.007 |
| Inclination (i) | 61.8±1.5° |
| Semi-amplitude (K_{1}) (primary) | 158.0±2.7 km/s |
| Semi-amplitude (K_{2}) (secondary) | 278.1±2.8 km/s |

Details

WR
| Mass | 94.4 M_{☉} |
| Radius | 23.3±1.6 R_{☉} |
| Luminosity | 1,510,000 L_{☉} |
| Surface gravity (log g) | 3.69 cgs |
| Temperature | 45,000 K |

O
| Mass | 53.6 M_{☉} |
| Radius | 14.8±2.0 R_{☉} |
| Luminosity | 1,050,000 L_{☉} |
| Surface gravity (log g) | 3.81 cgs |
| Temperature | 50,680 K |
| Age | 1.5 Myr |

Other designations
- WR 21a, 2MASS J10255650-5748435

Database references
| SIMBAD | data |

WR 21a is an eclipsing binary star in the constellation Carina. It includes one of the most massive known stars and is one of the most massive binaries.

WR 21a lies near the Westerlund 2 open cluster and likely to be an ejected member.

The distance of WR 21a was not definitively known until Gaia mission. There have been estimates from 2.85 kpc to around 8 kpc, with consequent uncertainties in the system luminosity. The larger distance was preferred because of consistency with the derived orbital parameters.

Every 31 days and 16 hours the two stars in this system revolve around each other. The inclination of the orbit means that only very shallow eclipses are observed and the brightness dips by only about 0.05 magnitudes. There are also even smaller brightness variations attributed to the heartbeat effect where the closest passage of the stars in their eccentric orbits creates brightness changes as the two stars illuminate each other. There may also be tidally-excited oscillations producing further small variations.

The colliding winds of the two stars produce extremely high temperatures and luminous x-ray emission. The system is also bright at radio wavelengths.
