= WR 20a =

Star in the constellation Carina

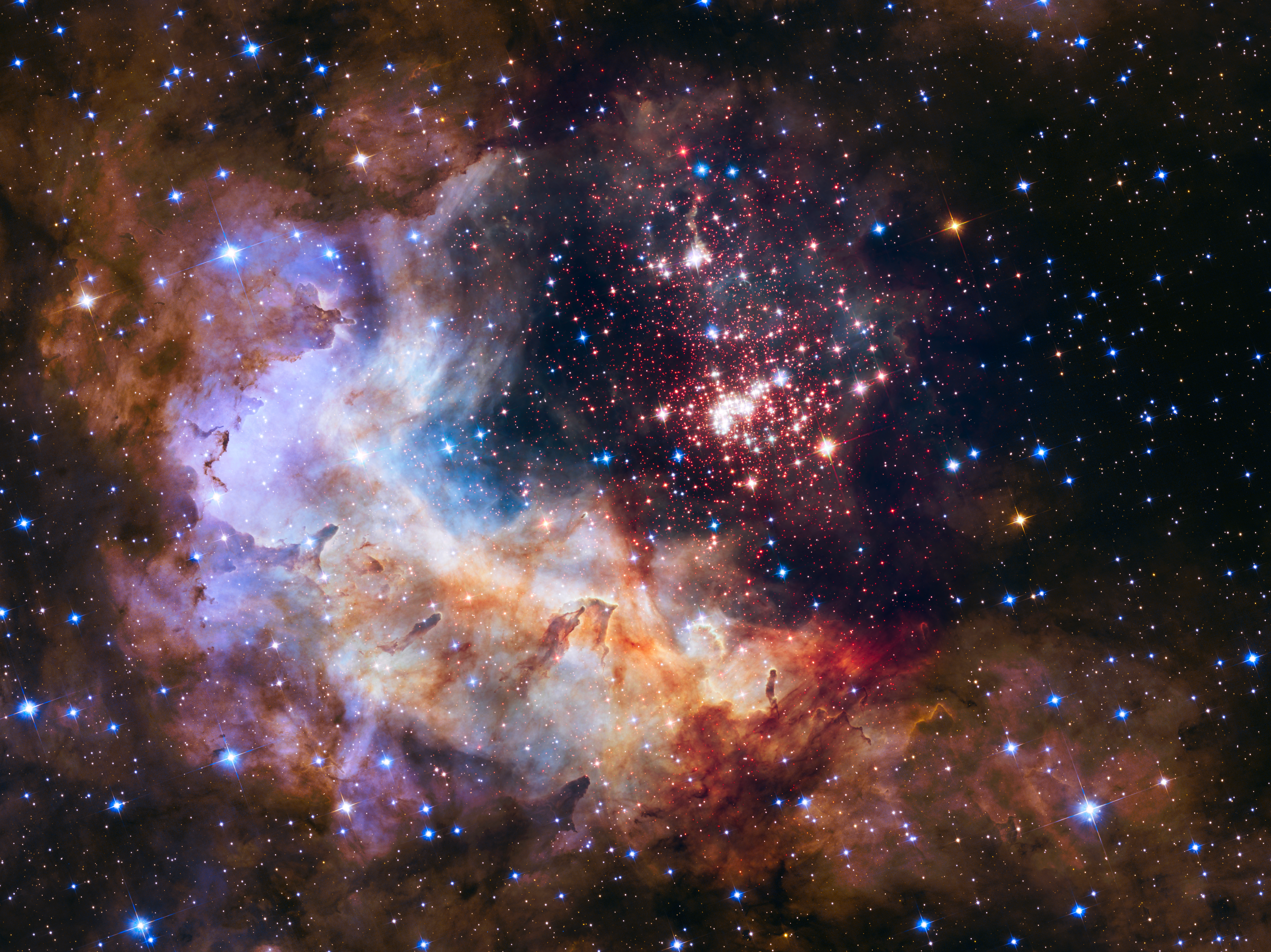
- WR 20a (circled) near Westerlund 2 Credit: NASA, ESA, the Hubble Heritage Team (STScI/AURA), A. Nota (ESA/STScI), and the Westerlund 2 Science Team

Observation data Epoch J2000 Equinox ICRS
- Constellation: Carina
- Right ascension: 10^{h} 23^{m} 58.002^{s}
- Declination: −57° 45′ 48.99″
- Apparent magnitude (V): 13.28

Characteristics
- Evolutionary stage: slash stars
- Spectral type: O3If*/WN6 + O3If*/WN6
- U−B color index: +0.29
- B−V color index: +1.63
- Variable type: β Lyr + WR

Astrometry
Proper motion (μ)	RA: −5.391 mas/yr Dec.: +2.949 mas/yr
Parallax (π)	0.2310±0.0171 mas
Distance	20,500 ± 2,300 ly (6,300±700 pc)
Absolute magnitude (M_{V})	−6.49 / −6.49

Orbit
Period (P)	3.68475±0.0012 days
Semi-major axis (a)	26 R_{☉}
Eccentricity (e)	0
Inclination (i)	74.5±1.0°
Semi-amplitude (K_{1}) (primary)	353.1 km/s
Semi-amplitude (K_{2}) (secondary)	362.6 km/s

Details

Primary
Mass	82.2±4.7 M_{☉}
Radius	14.1±0.4 R_{☉}
Luminosity	600,000+140,000 −110,000 L_{☉}
Surface gravity (log g)	3.8 cgs
Temperature	43,000±2,000 K

Secondary
Mass	81.4±4.7 M_{☉}
Radius	19.3±0.5 R_{☉}
Luminosity	540,000+120,000 −100,000 L_{☉}
Surface gravity (log g)	3.8 cgs
Temperature	41,840±250 K

Other designations
- V712 Carinae, THA 35-II-36, Westerlund 2 MSP 240, 2MASS J10235800-5745489, UBV M 40466, Westerlund 2 4

Database references
SIMBAD	data

WR 20a is an eclipsing binary star belonging to or recently (0.5 millions years before present) ejected from the young, massive cluster Westerlund 2. It was discovered in 2004 to be one of the most massive binary systems for which the masses of the components have been accurately measured.

Each star in the system has about eighty times the mass of the Sun. It is not clear why this system is located away from the center of the cluster. It is possible that the system was formed in the core, but that it was ejected by dynamical interactions.

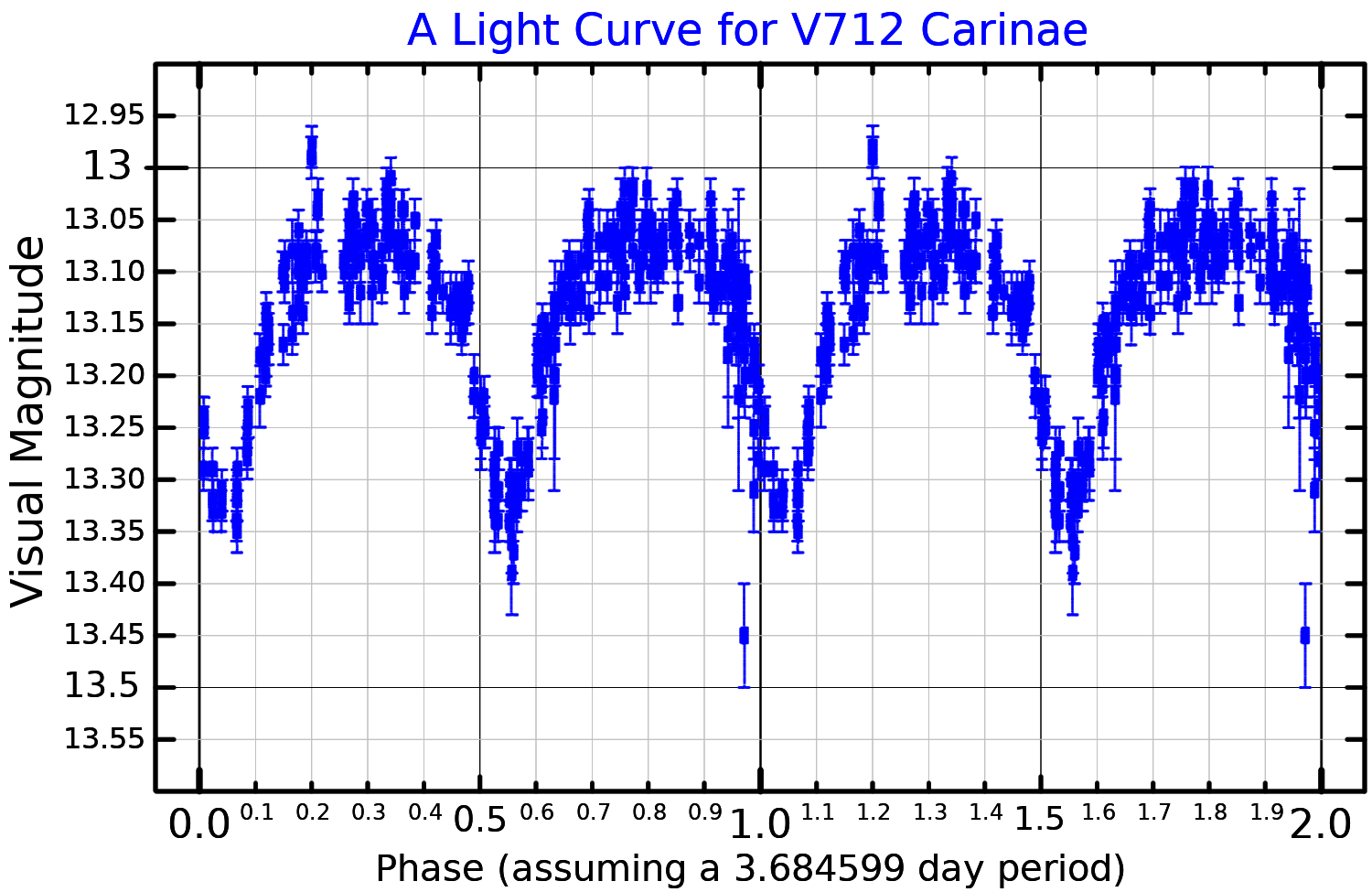
A visual band light curve for WR 20a (V712 Carinae), adapted from Kochanek et al. (2017)

Every 3.6 days the two stars in this system revolve around each other. Although the stars are in a very tight orbit, both stars in the system are detached. In 2004, Alceste Z. Bonanos et al. announced their discovery that the two stars eclipse each other on each orbit, producing a drop in brightness of about 0.4 magnitudes. The brightness is also continuously variable outside the eclipses due to the distorted shapes of the two stars. The primary and secondary minima are almost the same depth since the size and temperature of each star is almost identical.

It is expected that within a million years the two will expand and come into contact. A large nitrogen abundance has been measured on the surface of the stars, about six times the abundance of nitrogen measured in the sun. This nitrogen is probably produced in deeper layers of the star and pushed towards the surface by rotational mixing.

A collision between the two winds of the systems has been detected in the visible as well as in X-rays. The X-ray emitting region must be quite extended since it does not suffer from any eclipse.

== See also ==
- List of most massive stars
