= NGC 2029 =

Emission nebula in the constellation Dorado

Emission nebula
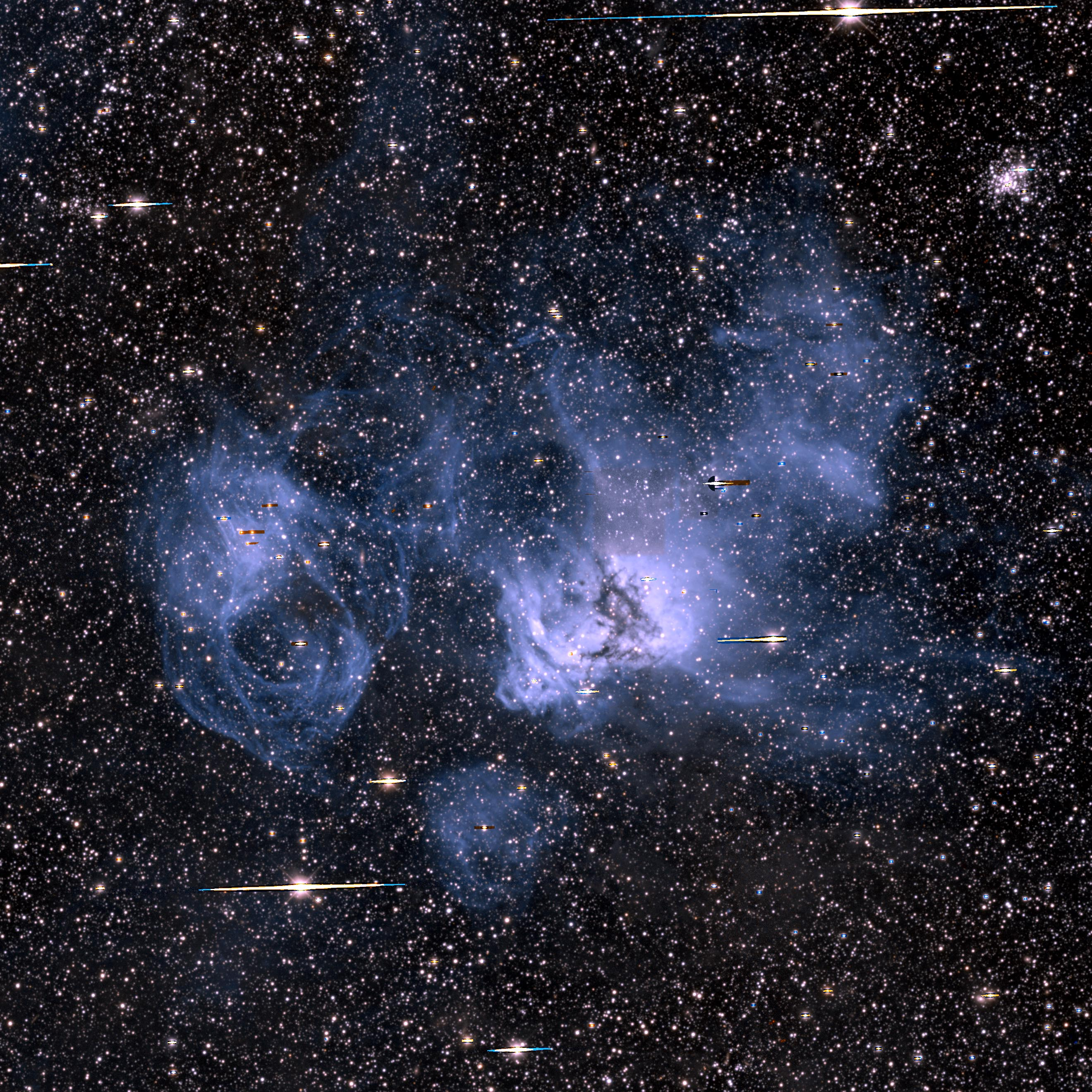
- The emission nebula NGC 2029 with NGC 2032 (right), NGC 2035 (middle) and NGC 2040 (left). Image from the legacy surveys

Observation data: epoch
- Right ascension: 05^{h} 35^{m} 00^{s}
- Declination: −67° 33′ 00″
- Apparent magnitude (V): 12.29
- Constellation: Dorado
- Designations: ESO 56-EN156

NGC 2029 (also known as ESO 56-EN156 or the Dragon's Head Nebula) is an emission nebula in the constellation Dorado and is part of the Large Magellanic Cloud. It is part of a complex of nebulae and stars, including NGC 2032, NGC 2035 and NGC 2040. It was discovered by James Dunlop on the 27 September 1826. Its apparent magnitude is 12.29, and its size is 2.25 arc minutes.

The coordinates for NGC 2029 and NGC 2030 were reversed between Herschel's original Catalogue of Nebulae and Clusters of Stars and the New General Catalogue. NGC 2030, originally GC 2029, is an isolated nebula with an embedded star cluster, about 1.5 degrees north of NGC 2029.
