= Westerlund 2 =

Open star cluster in the Carina constellation

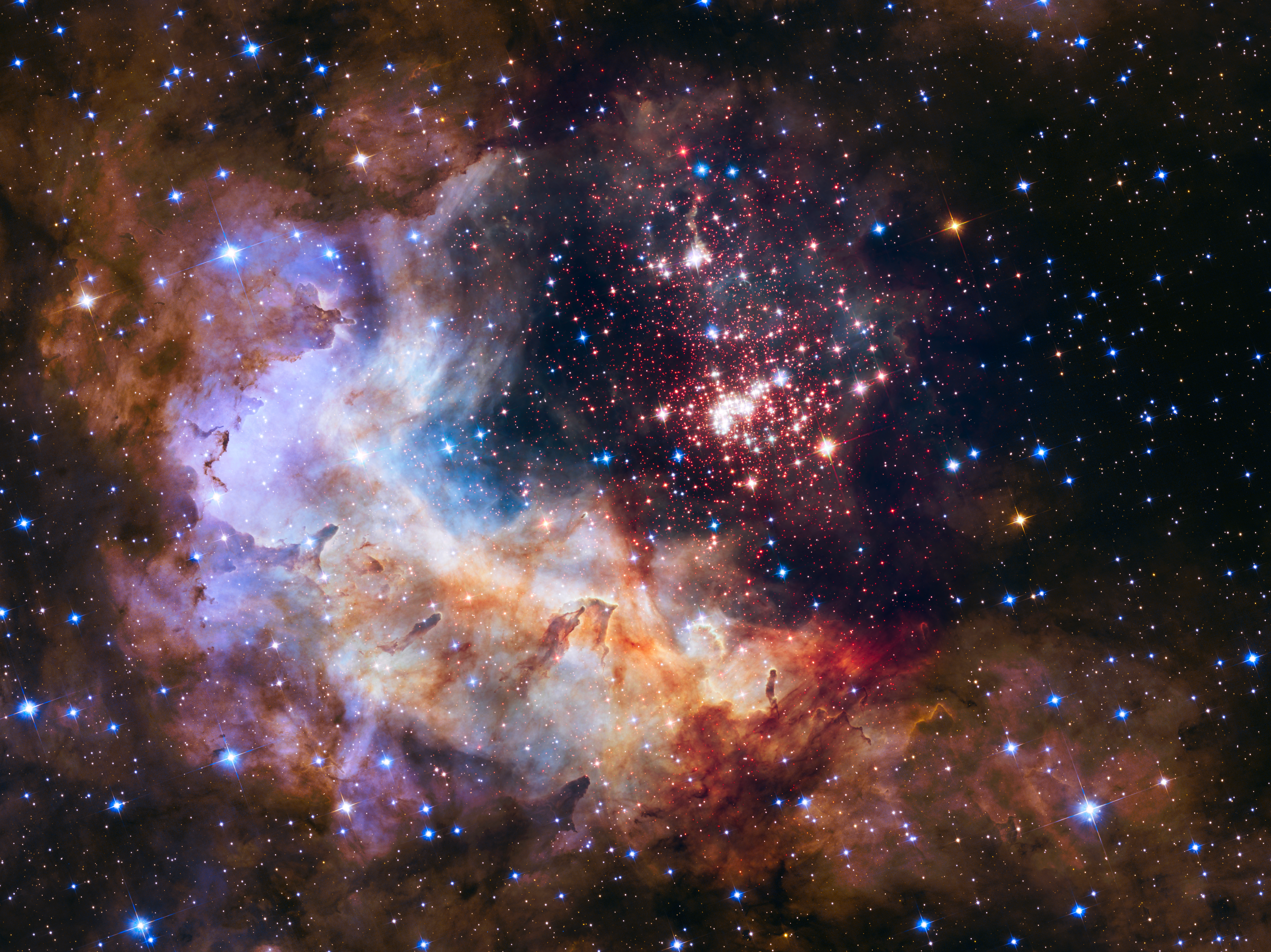
- The cluster Westerlund 2 and its surroundings Credit: Hubble Space Telescope

Observation data (J2000 epoch)
- Right ascension: 10^{h} 23^{m} 58.1^{s}
- Declination: −57° 45′ 49″
- Distance: 20000 ly (6000 pc)
- Apparent magnitude (V): 10.5

Physical characteristics
- Contains some of the hottest, brightest, and most massive stars.
- Other designations: ESO 127-18, VDBH 95

Associations
- Constellation: Carina

Westerlund 2 is an obscured compact young star cluster (perhaps even a super star cluster) in the Milky Way, with an estimated age of about one or two million years. It contains some of the hottest, brightest, and most massive stars known. The cluster resides inside H II region RCW 49, located 20,000 light-years away in the constellation Carina. It is half a degree from the naked eye Cepheid variable V399 Carinae.

== Cluster members ==
The cluster contains at least a dozen early O stars, of which at least three are eclipsing binaries. All are hotter than 38,000 K and more luminous than 230,000 L_{☉}. There are around 20 further O class stars in the cluster, all main sequence objects implying a very young age for the cluster.

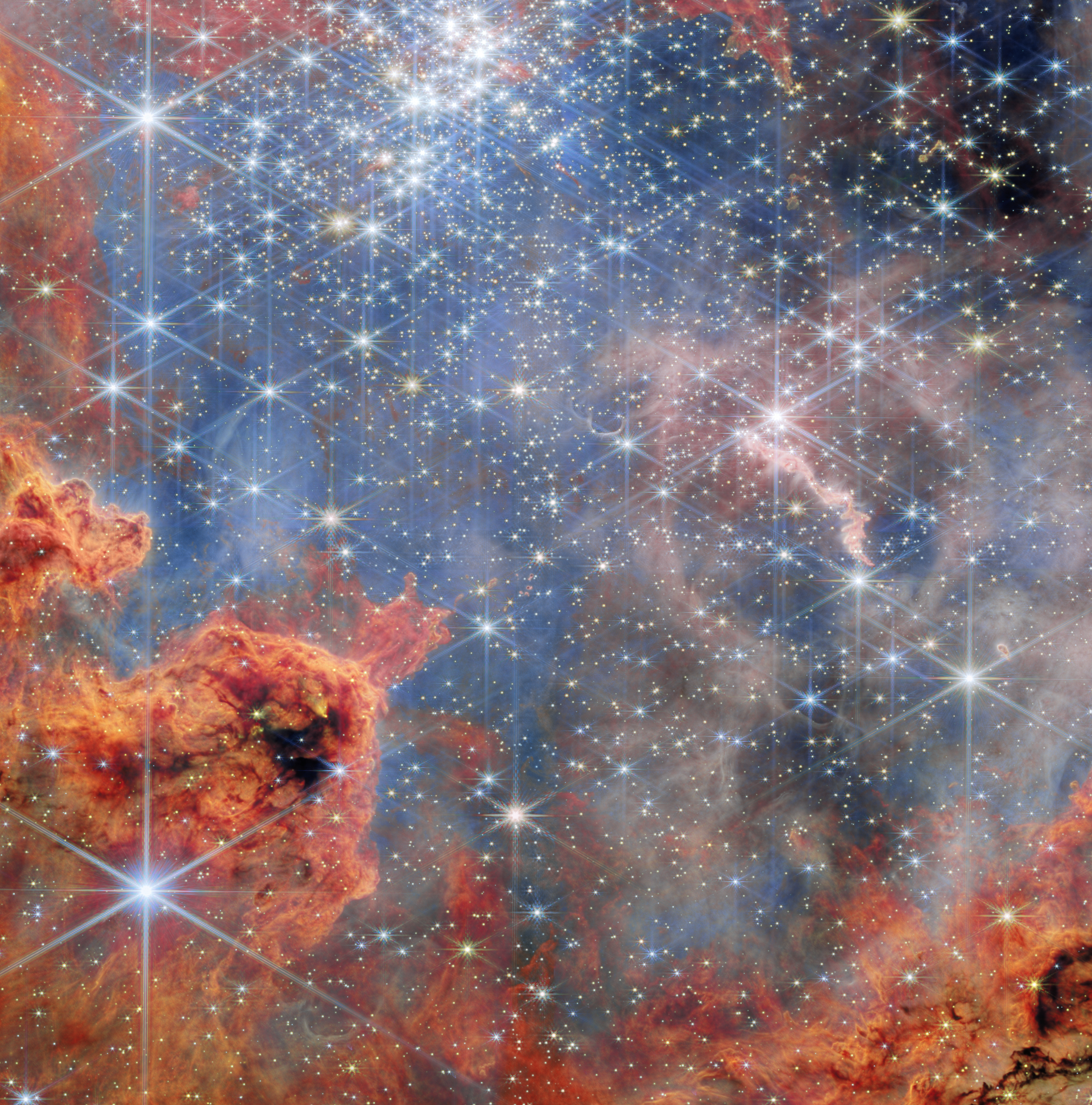
Westerlund 2 imaged by the James Webb Space Telescope (north is towards bottom right)

Several Wolf–Rayet stars are found in the vicinity of Westerlund 2, although not in the central core. WR 20a, a binary consisting of two WR stars, and the single stars WR 20aa, WR 20b, and WR 20c are all thought to be members of the cluster, although possibly now runaway members. All five Wolf Rayets are extremely young massive objects with OIf^{*}/WN spectral types, amongst the most luminous stars in the galaxy. This composite spectral type indicates young very massive hydrogen-burning stars that are just starting to convect nitrogen and helium to the surface and develop denser stellar winds so that they show the emission lines of a Wolf-Rayet star. WR21a, itself a massive binary, lies in the same direction but is unlikely to be a member of Westerlund 2.

Westerlund 2 also contains a large number of pre-main sequence stars with masses below 2.5 M_{☉}. These stars constrain the age of the cluster to near 2 Myr.

== Discovery ==
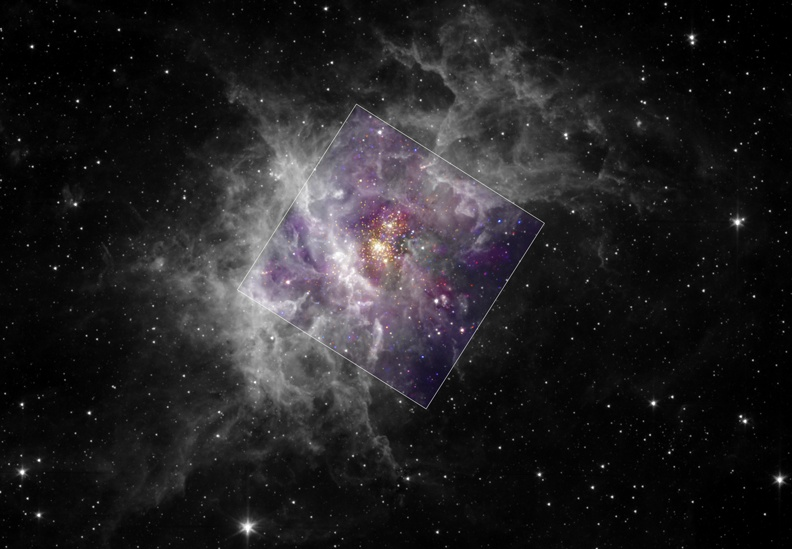
Westerlund 2 surrounded by stellar nursery RCW 49

As its name indicates, the Westerlund 2 cluster was discovered by Bengt Westerlund in the 1960s but its stellar content was assessed only in later years.

== Hubble 25th Anniversary Image ==
On 23 April 2015 an image of the Westerlund 2 cluster was chosen to celebrate the 25th anniversary of the Hubble Space Telescope.

== See also ==
- Westerlund 1
- R136
