= LH 54-425 =

Star in the constellation Dorado

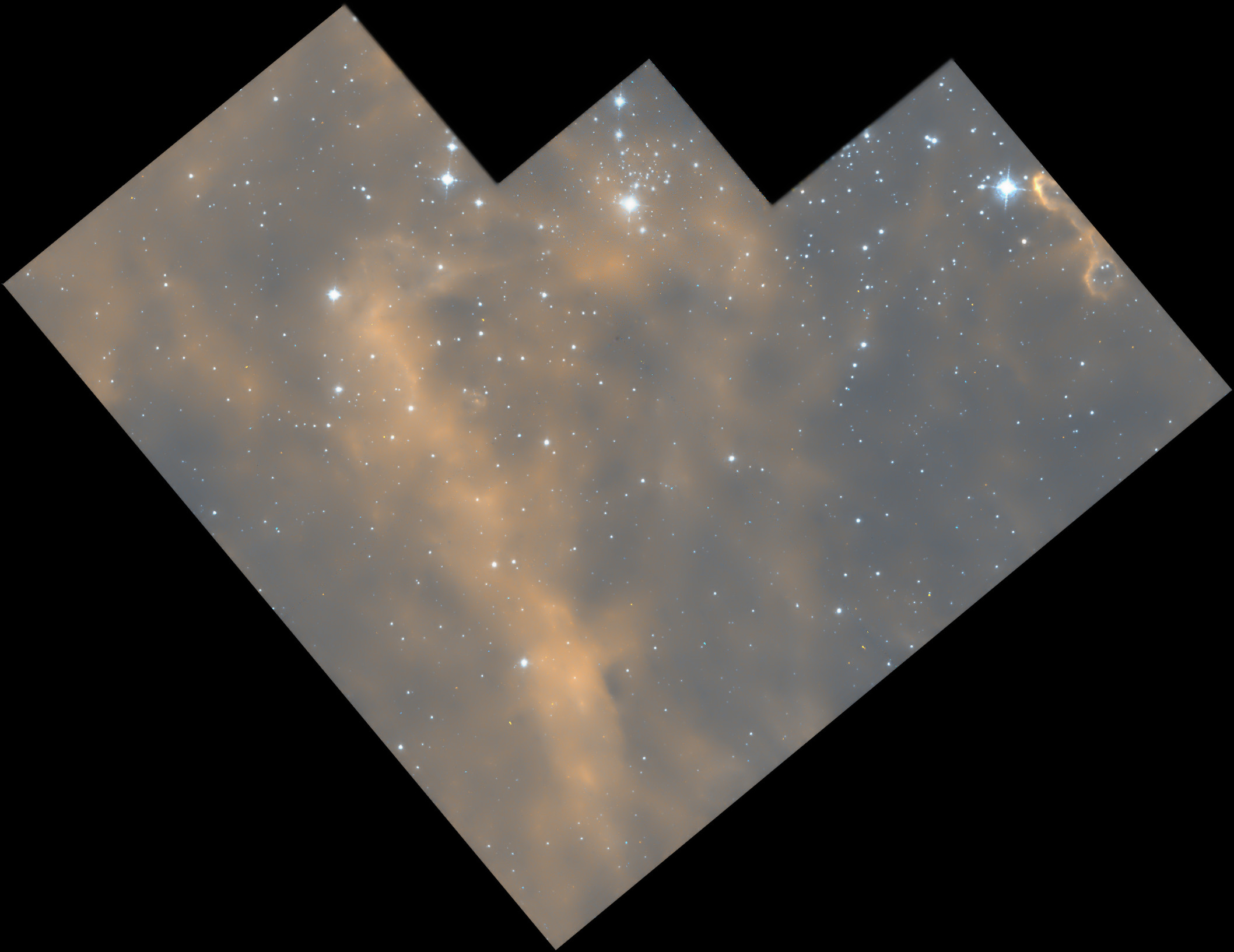
- LH 54-425 is the bright star on the left. NGC 1955 is the cluster in the middle, dominated by the B0 supergiant HD 269925. The bright star on the right is the Wolf–Rayet/O-supergiant binary HD 36402.

Observation data Epoch J2000 Equinox ICRS
- Constellation: Dorado
- Right ascension: 05^{h} 26^{m} 24.2505^{s}
- Declination: −67° 30′ 17.194″
- Apparent magnitude (V): 13.13

Characteristics
- Spectral type: O3V + O5V
- U−B color index: +0.01
- B−V color index: −0.31

Orbit
Period (P)	2.2474 days
Semi-major axis (a)	30.4 R_{☉}
Eccentricity (e)	0
Inclination (i)	55°
Semi-amplitude (K_{1}) (primary)	201.6 km/s
Semi-amplitude (K_{2}) (secondary)	359.1 km/s

Details

primary
Mass	47 M_{☉}
Radius	11.4 R_{☉}
Luminosity	500,000 L_{☉}
Surface gravity (log g)	4.00 cgs
Temperature	45,000 K
Rotational velocity (v sin i)	197 km/s

secondary
Mass	28 M_{☉}
Radius	8.1 R_{☉}
Luminosity	160,000 L_{☉}
Surface gravity (log g)	4.07 cgs
Temperature	41,000 K
Rotational velocity (v sin i)	182 km/s
Age	2.0 Myr

Database references
SIMBAD	data

LH 54-425 is a spectroscopic binary star system in the LH 54 OB association within the Large Magellanic Cloud in the constellation Dorado.

== Discovery and visibility ==
The OB association LH 54 was catalogued by astronomers Lucke and Hodge in 1970, listed as containing 18 member stars. It is associated with NGC 1955, part of the N51 H_{II} region. The brightness and colour of LH 54-425 were measured in 1974. In 1996 M.S. Oey determined that LH 54-425 has an apparent (visual) magnitude of 13.13 and classified it as an O3-class giant.

A series of photometric and spectroscopic observations carried out by P. Ostrov between from 1998 to 2001 revealed that LH 54-425 varied very slightly with a regular period of 2.2475 days due to distorted stars in a close binary system composed by an O3 class giant and an approximately O5 class companion. The masses of the two stars were estimated at 100 M_{☉} and 50 M_{☉}. A derivation of the orbit in 2008 using more accurate radial velocity data defined the companions as O3 and O5 main sequence stars with masses of 47 M_{☉} and 28 M_{☉} respectively.

== System ==
The binary system has an orbital period of 2 days, 5 hours, and 56 minutes. The two stars are separated by only 15 times the width of the sun, or less than twice their own diameters. The more massive primary orbits at 200 km/s, while the secondary moves at 350 km/s, and the system as a whole is approaching us at around 300 km/s.

== Properties ==
Both members of the LH 54-425 binary system are hot, massive, and luminous stars. The less massive secondary has an effective surface temperature of 41,000 K and the more massive primary is 45,000 K. The stars are 8 and 11 times the size of the sun, and the combination of high temperature and large size means the primary star is 500,000 times as luminous as the sun and the secondary 160,000 times as luminous. They are emitting a stellar wind with a velocity of 2,800 km/s.

== Evolution ==
Stellar evolutionary models closely match the properties of the two stars at two million years old. At this age, they have almost the same mass as when they first formed. Comparison between the models and observations suggest a small mass discrepancy, with the models predicting higher masses than those derived from the orbit. This is a long-standing and unsolved problem in the modelling of massive stars.

As the pair evolve, they may merge to form a single massive star. In time, the individual stars or the result of the merger will explode as a core-collapse supernova.
