= NGC 2032 =

Emission nebula in the constellation Dorado

Emission nebula

Observation data: epoch
- Right ascension: 05^{h} 35^{m} 20.0^{s}
- Declination: −67° 34′ 36″
- Constellation: Dorado
- Designations: ESO 56-EN160, Seagull Nebula

NGC 2032 (also known as ESO 56-EN160 and the Seagull Nebula) is an emission nebula in the constellation Dorado and near the supershell LMC-4 and it consists of NGC 2029, NGC 2035 and NGC 2040. It was first discovered by James Dunlop on 27 September 1826, and John Herschel rerecorded it on 2 November 1834. NGC 2032 is located in the Large Magellanic Cloud.
