= NGC 2035 =

Emission nebula in the constellation Dorado

Nebula
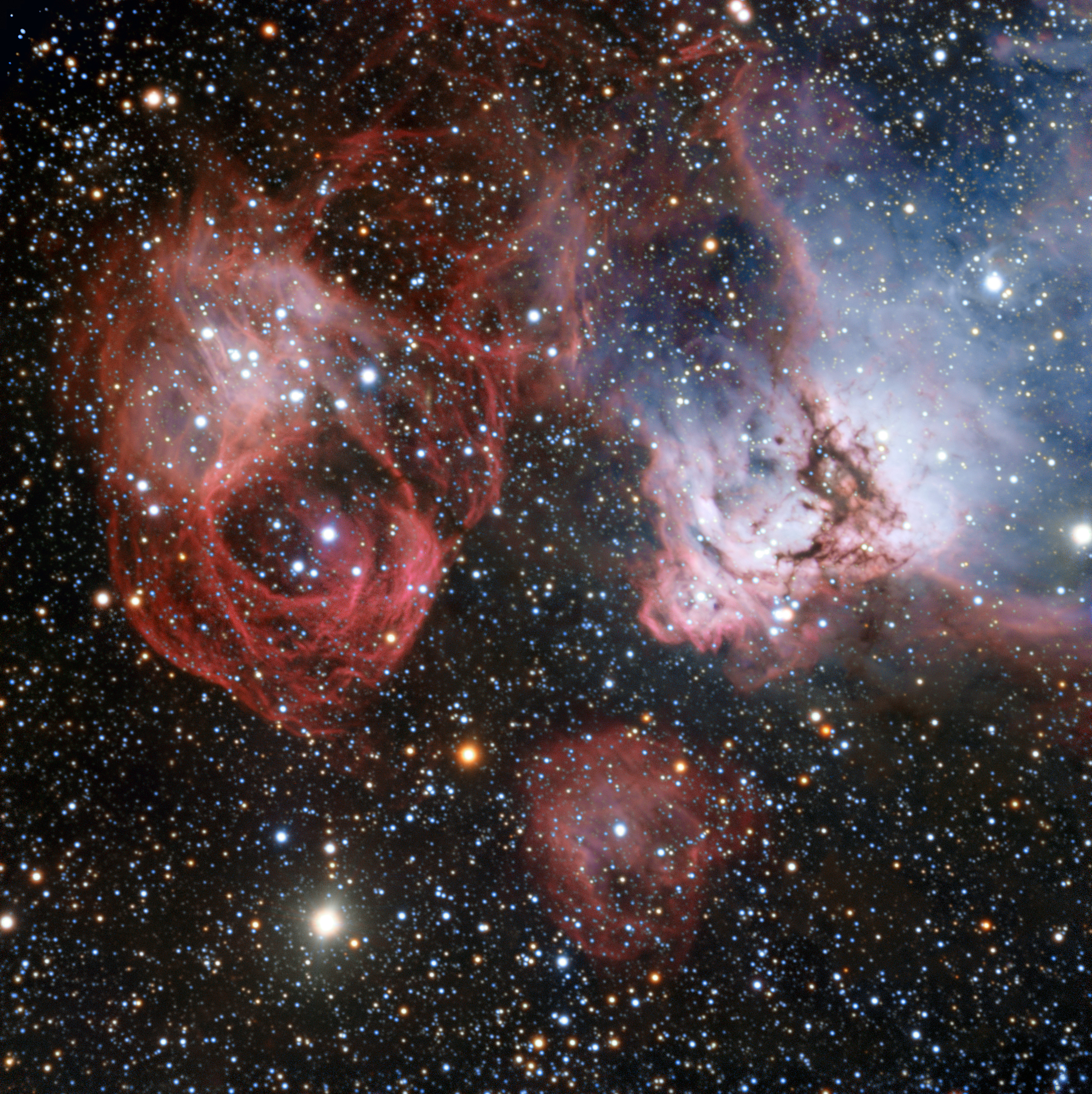
- NGC 2035, just right of centre, with NGC 2032 on the right and NGC 2040 on the left (ESO)

Observation data: epoch
- Right ascension: 05^{h} 35^{m} 30.0^{s}
- Declination: −67° 35′ 00″
- Apparent dimensions (V): 3.0
- Constellation: Dorado
- Designations: ESO 56-EN161, Dragon's Head Nebula

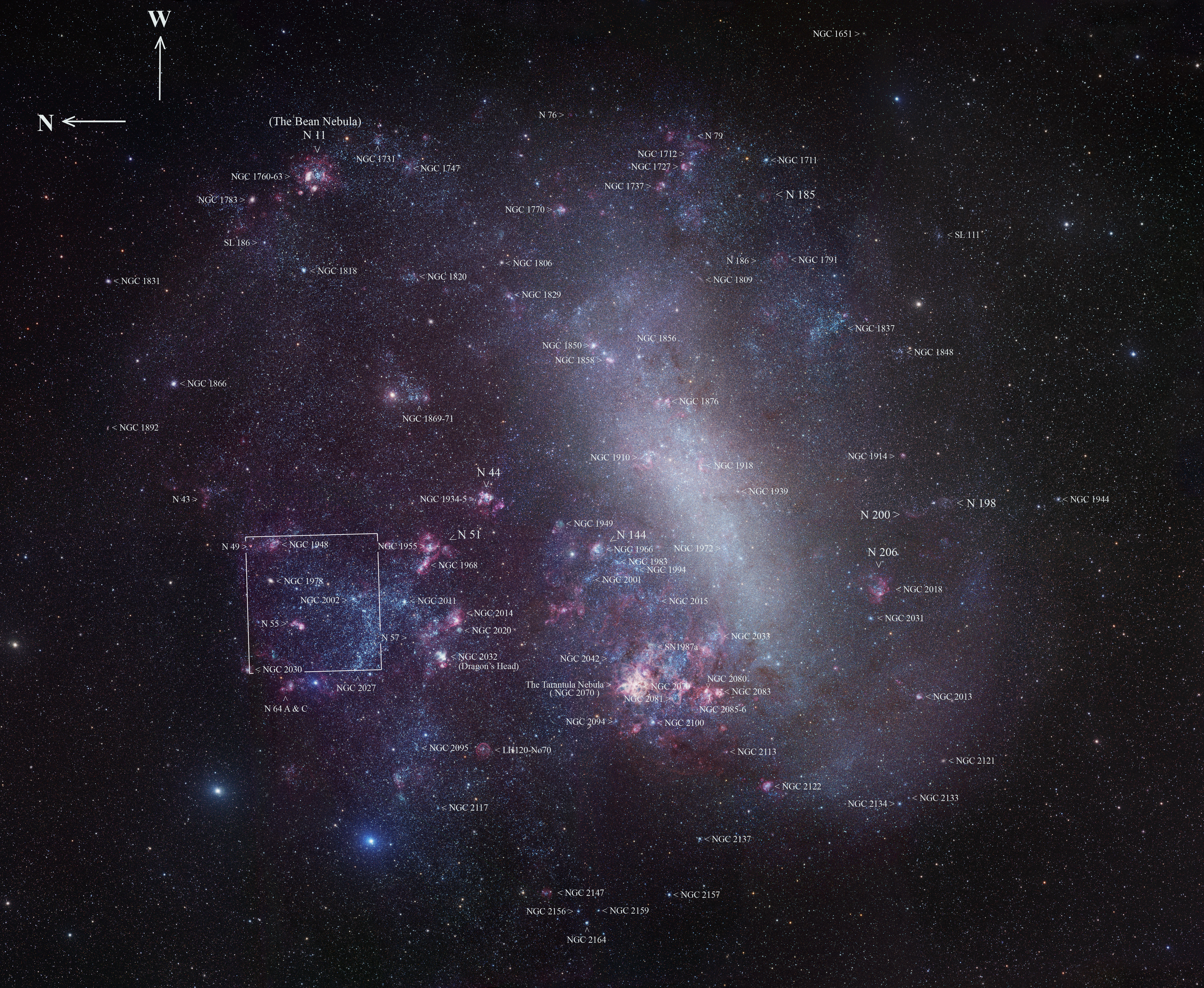
The Large Magellanic Cloud, with the location of NGC 2035 and NGC 2032 marked just left of centre

NGC 2035 (also known as ESO 56-EN161 and the Dragon's Head Nebula) is an emission nebula and a H II region in the constellation Dorado and part of the Large Magellanic Cloud. It was discovered by James Dunlop on August 3, 1826. Its apparent size is 3.0.

NGC 2035 is part of a complex of nebulae and stars, including NGC 2029, NGC 2032 and NGC 2040, found north of the main bar of the LMC. It consists of large bright gas clouds which are separated by dark dust clouds. NGC 2029, NGC 2032 and NGC 2035 are star-forming regions, while NGC 2040 is a supernova remnant which contains an open cluster.
