= MACHO 80.7443.1718 =

Binary star in the Large Magellanic Cloud

Observation data Epoch J2000.0 Equinox ICRS
- Constellation: Dorado
- Right ascension: 05^{h} 26^{m} 24.462^{s}
- Declination: −68° 47′ 04.94″
- Apparent magnitude (V): 13.628

Characteristics
- Evolutionary stage: Supergiant + Main-sequence star
- Spectral type: B0 Iae + O9.5 V
- Variable type: Heartbeat star

Astrometry
Radial velocity (R_{v})	289.4±1.5 km/s
Proper motion (μ)	RA: 1.607 mas/yr Dec.: 0.509 mas/yr

Orbit
Period (P)	32.83627±0.00846 d
Semi-major axis (a)	159 R_{☉}
Eccentricity (e)	0.507±0.033
Inclination (i)	43.9±0.2°
Periastron epoch (T)	2458505.470±0.034
Argument of periastron (ω) (secondary)	300.2±2.0°
Semi-amplitude (K_{1}) (primary)	61.9±2.8 km/s

Details

A
Mass	34.5+1.5 −2.0 M_{☉}
Radius	23.7+2.9 −1.2 R_{☉}
Luminosity	4.07+0.39 −0.36×10^{5} L_{☉}
Surface gravity (log g)	3.25±0.25 cgs
Temperature	30000±1000 K
Age	5.6+1.5 −1.1 Myr

B
Mass	15.7±1.3 M_{☉}
Radius	5.7+0.4 −0.5 R_{☉}
Luminosity	2.88+0.83 −0.70×10^{4} L_{☉}
Surface gravity (log g)	4.1±0.1 cgs
Temperature	31600±1000 K

Other designations
- 2MASS J05262445−6847049, ASASSN-V J052624.38−684705.6, SSTISAGEMC J052624.46−684705.0, TIC 373840312, GMP94 100, Gaia DR2 4658489067332871552, Gaia DR3 4658489067332871552

Database references
SIMBAD	data

MACHO 80.7443.1718 is a binary star in the LH 58 association in the Large Magellanic Cloud, in the constellation of Dorado, first identified among about 800 stars in 1994. It consists of a 35 M_{☉} blue supergiant in an eccentric orbit with a secondary companion that cannot be observed directly, but is likely an O-type main-sequence star of around 15 M_{☉}.

It is the most extreme heartbeat star known, exhibiting variations in brightness of around 40% due to a strong tidal resonance at the 25th and 41st harmonics of its orbital period, plus a 10% variation at other times due to tidal resonances. With a combined mass of ~50 M_{☉}, it is also the second most massive such system known, after HD 5980 AB. The tidal interactions at periastron produce immense, unstable waves on the primary with a height of 2.7 million miles (4.3×10^{6} km), or 6 R_{☉}; and disrupts its atmosphere. It has also accelerated the spin to the point that it is now an oblate spheroid.

The system's orbit is slowly decaying as mass is transferred from the secondary to the primary star, which led astrophysicists Abraham Loeb and Morgan MacLeod of the Harvard–Smithsonian Center for Astrophysics to describe MACHO 80.7443.1718 as a "heartbreak star". Jayasinghe et al. (2021) modeled the system and predicted that the primary will eventually overflow its Roche lobe and deposit mass onto the secondary, inflating its mass to 24 M_{☉}. The primary will eventually go supernova and become a black hole of about 8 M_{☉}, but the explosion would not be strong enough to eject the secondary. The secondary will become a 12 M_{☉} helium star, and be ejected from the system when it goes supernova as well, leaving a 1.6 M_{☉} neutron star remnant. However, according to Susan Mallally at the Space Telescope Science Institute, the heartbeat mass transfer may influence the system's evolution in ways that cannot be predicted using current models.
