= Kappa Doradus =

Suspected variable in the constellation Dorado

κ Doradus
- Location of κ Doradus on the map (circled)

Observation data Epoch J2000.0 Equinox ICRS
- Constellation: Dorado
- Right ascension: 04^{h} 44^{m} 21.17834^{s}
- Declination: −59° 43′ 57.8563″
- Apparent magnitude (V): 5.28 (5.27 - 5.30)

Characteristics
- Spectral type: A8 IV
- B−V color index: +0.20
- Variable type: suspected δ Scuti

Astrometry
Radial velocity (R_{v})	0.00±3.70 km/s
Proper motion (μ)	RA: +23.860 mas/yr Dec.: +39.974 mas/yr
Parallax (π)	14.8207±0.0795 mas
Distance	220 ± 1 ly (67.5 ± 0.4 pc)
Absolute magnitude (M_{V})	+1.15

Details
Mass	1.78^{+0.36}_{−0.20} M_{☉}
Radius	2.88^{+0.21}_{−0.19} R_{☉}
Luminosity	26.6 L_{☉}
Surface gravity (log g)	3.79±0.08 cgs
Temperature	7,623±123 K
Metallicity [Fe/H]	−0.18 dex
Rotational velocity (v sin i)	230 km/s

Other designations
- κ Dor, 12 G. Doradus, NSV 16162, CPD−59°376, FK5 2354, GC 5810, HD 30478, HIP 22040, HR 1530, SAO 233664, TIC 220414802

Database references
SIMBAD	data

Kappa Doradus is a solitary star located in the southern constellation of Dorado. Its name is a Bayer designation that is Latinized from κ Doradus and abbreviated Kappa Dor or κ Dor. This star is faintly visible to the naked eye as a white-hued point of light with an apparent magnitude of 5.28. The object is located relatively close at a distance of 220 light-years based on Gaia DR3 parallax measurements. Its heliocentric radial velocity is too poorly constrained to determine whether its distance from the Solar System is changing significantly. At its current distance, Kappa Doradus' brightness is diminished by two-tenths of a magnitude due to interstellar extinction and it has an absolute magnitude of +1.15.

Houk & Cowley (1975) found a stellar classification of A8/9 III/IV, which means it is presenting as an evolved A-type star with the characteristics of an A8 and A9 star and the blended luminosity class of a giant star and a subgiant. It has also been assigned a class of A8 IV and A5 III, indicating either a slightly evolved subgiant or an evolved giant star.

Kappa Doradus has 1.78 times the mass of the Sun and 2.88 times the radius of the Sun. However, this is only its polar radius, as it has an equatorial bulge 26% greater than its polar radius. It radiates 26.6 times the luminosity of the Sun from its photosphere at an effective temperature of 7,623 K. Kappa Doradus is metal deficient with an iron abundance 66.1% of the Sun's or [Fe/H] = −0.18. Like many hot stars it spins rapidly, having a projected rotational velocity of 230 km/s, which causes the aforementioned oblation.

Kappa Doradus variability was first observed in 1981 by astronomer H. M. Matizen. In the paper, it is used as a comparison star for Alpha Doradus. Matizen found out that Kappa Doradus show Delta Scuti-like amplitudes of 0.03 magnitudes in the visual passband within hours. As of 2004 however, it has not been confirmed to be variable.
