= HD 74423 =

Variable star in the constellation Volans

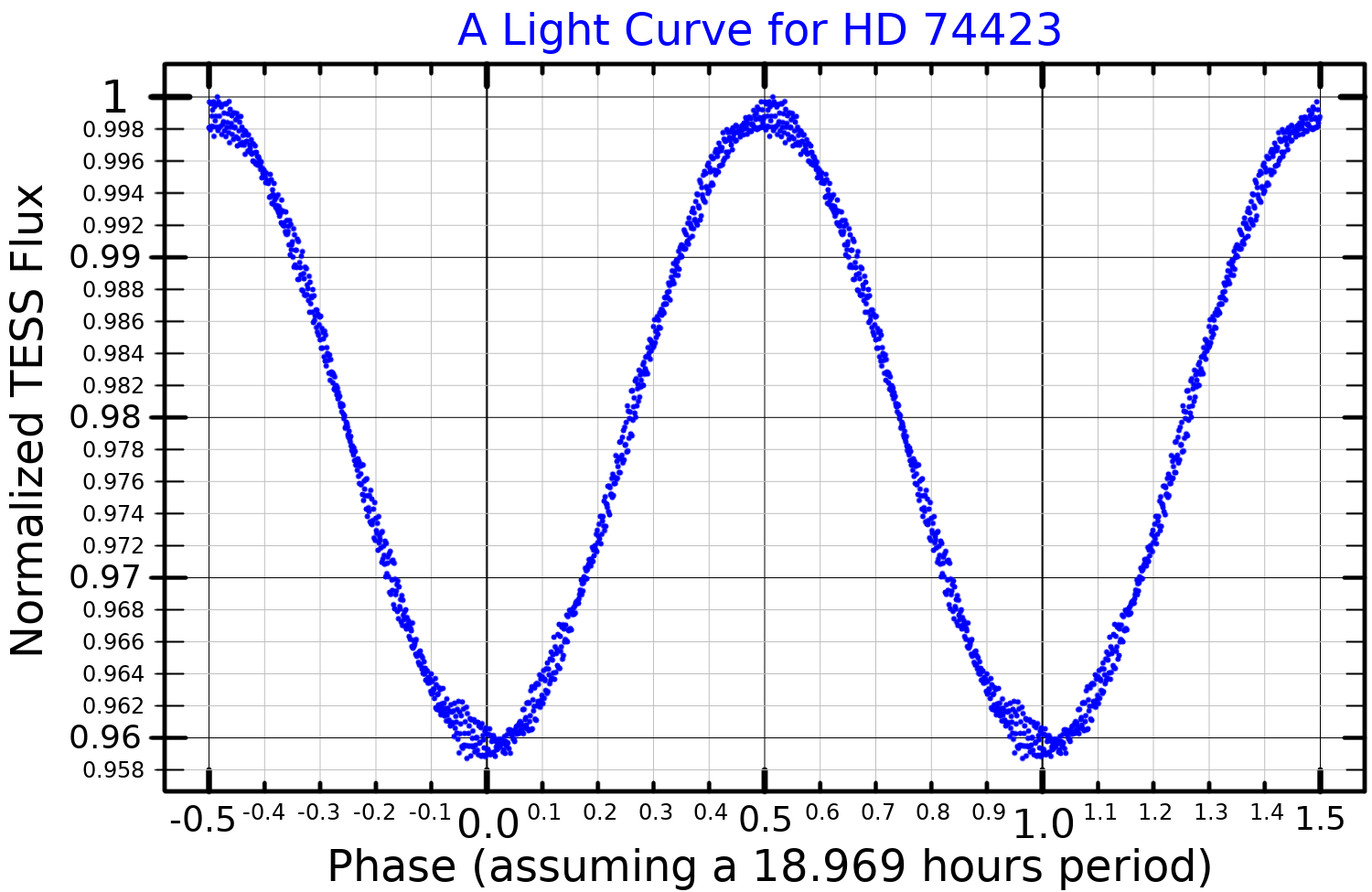
- A light curve for HD 74423 plotted from TESS data

Observation data Epoch J2000.0 Equinox J2000.0 (ICRS)
- Constellation: Volans
- Right ascension: 08^{h} 40^{m} 17.985^{s}
- Declination: −64° 50′ 16.84″
- Apparent magnitude (V): 8.58–8.66

Characteristics
- Evolutionary stage: main sequence
- Spectral type: A7VkA0mA0 λ Boo
- Apparent magnitude (B): 8.81±0.02
- Apparent magnitude (J): 8.065±0.020
- Apparent magnitude (H): 8.021±0.067
- Apparent magnitude (K): 7.944±0.040
- Variable type: α^{2} CVn or Ellipsoidal and δ Sct

Astrometry
| Proper motion (μ) | RA: −9.719 mas/yr Dec.: 11.732 mas/yr |
| Parallax (π) | 2.1018±0.0150 mas |
| Distance | 1,550 ± 10 ly (476 ± 3 pc) |

Details

primary
| Mass | 2.1 M_{☉} |
| Radius | 3.3 R_{☉} |
| Surface gravity (log g) | 3.6 cgs |
| Temperature | 7,900 K |
| Metallicity [Fe/H] | −1.0 dex |

secondary
| Mass | 2.0 M_{☉} |
| Radius | 3.2 R_{☉} |
| Surface gravity (log g) | 3.6 cgs |
| Temperature | 7,600 K |
| Metallicity [Fe/H] | −1.0 dex |
| Age | 800 Myr |

Other designations
- HD 74423, CD−64°342, SAO 250298, TYC 8934-1662-1, TIC 355151781

Database references
| SIMBAD | data |

HD 74423 is a heartbeat binary star and one component pulsates on only one hemisphere. This is caused by tidal interaction with its partner. The star is located in the constellation Volans.

HD 74423 is slightly variable in brightness. It fluctuates between magnitudes 8.58 and 8.66 every 19 hours. The exact variability type is unclear. It was initially found in a search for α^{2} Canum Venaticorum variables and assumed to be one, but has since been considered to be a δ Scuti variable. The spectrum shows unusually strong absorption lines of some iron peak elements, a characteristic of λ Boötis stars. Both components are thought to show the chemical peculiarity.
