= NGC 1955 =

Open cluster in the constellation Dorado

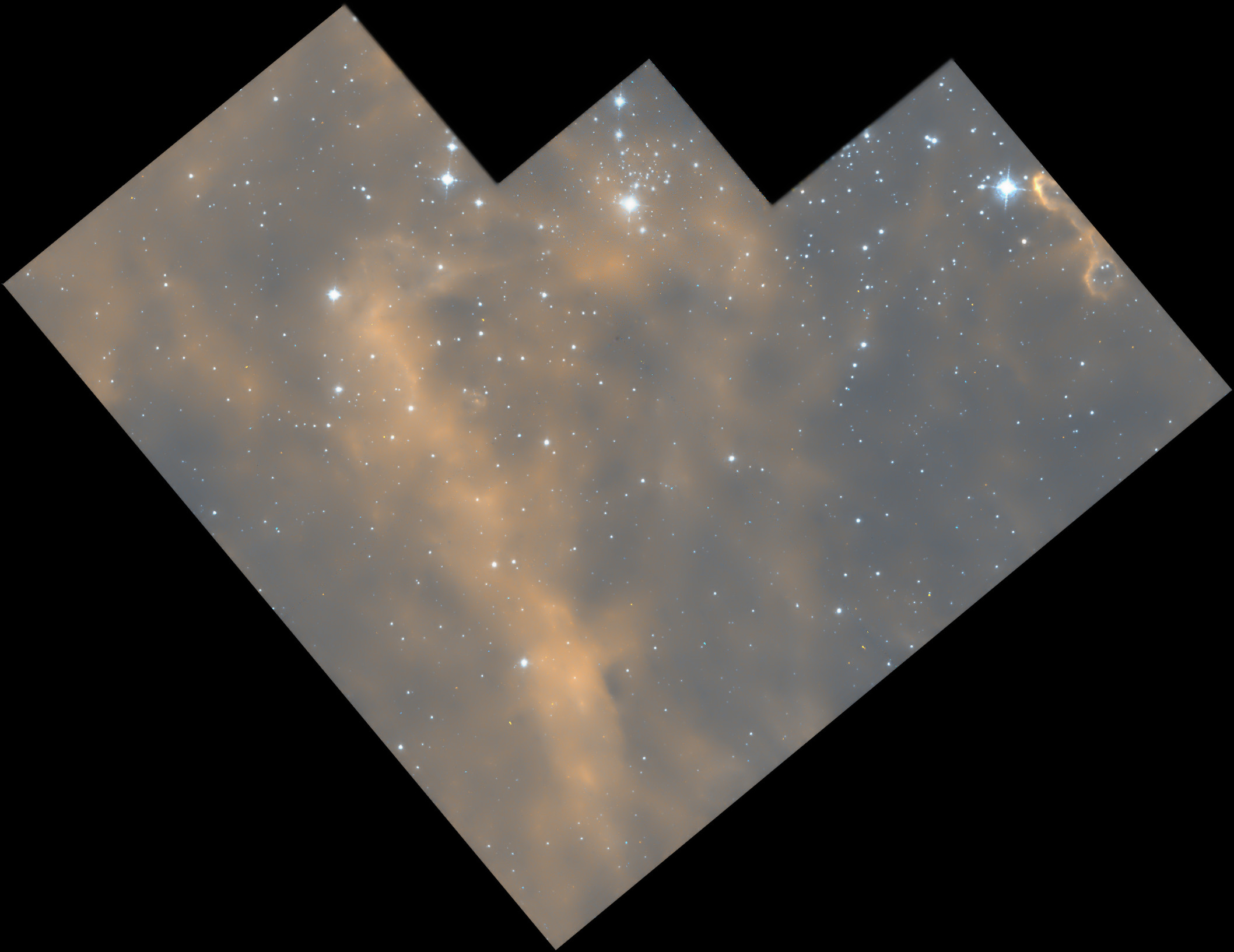
- The open cluster NGC 1955 and surrounding nebulosity

Observation data (J2000 epoch)
- Right ascension: 05^{h} 26^{m} 10.0^{s}
- Declination: −67° 29′ 51″
- Apparent magnitude (V): 9.0
- Apparent dimensions (V): 1.8

Physical characteristics
- Other designations: ESO 56-SC121, GC 1161, h 2863, Dun 211

Associations
- Constellation: Dorado

NGC 1955 (also known as ESO 56-SC121) is an open cluster associated with an emission nebula located in the constellation Dorado. This nebula is part of the H II region which is part of the Large Magellanic Cloud and was discovered by James Dunlop on August 3, 1826. Its apparent magnitude is 9.0, and its size is 1.8 arc minutes.
