= Lambda Doradus =

Star in the constellation of Dorado

λ Doradus
- Location of λ Doradus on the map (circled)

Observation data Epoch J2000.0 Equinox ICRS
- Constellation: Dorado
- Right ascension: 05^{h} 26^{m} 19.26577^{s}
- Declination: −58° 54′ 45.06402″
- Apparent magnitude (V): 5.13±0.01

Characteristics
- Evolutionary stage: red giant branch
- Spectral type: G6 III or G8 III
- B−V color index: +1.00

Astrometry
Radial velocity (R_{v})	10±0.07 km/s
Proper motion (μ)	RA: −9.792 mas/yr Dec.: +33.350 mas/yr
Parallax (π)	5.9209±0.0712 mas
Distance	551 ± 7 ly (169 ± 2 pc)
Absolute magnitude (M_{V})	−0.6

Details
Mass	3.82±0.16 M_{☉}
Radius	21.1±0.5 R_{☉}
Luminosity	252±9 L_{☉}
Surface gravity (log g)	2.41±0.12 cgs
Temperature	5,009±43 K
Metallicity [Fe/H]	−0.06±0.04 dex
Rotational velocity (v sin i)	5.2±1 km/s
Age	258 Myr

Other designations
- λ Dor, 23 G. Doradus, CPD−59°472, FK5 2410, GC 6749, HD 36189, HIP 25429, HR 1836, SAO 233981

Database references
SIMBAD	data

Lambda Doradus is a solitary yellow hued star located in the southern constellation of Dorado. Its name is a Bayer designation that is Latinized from λ Doradus and abbreviated Lambda Dor or λ Dor. This star has an apparent visual magnitude of 5.13, making it faintly visible to the naked eye if viewed under ideal conditions. Parallax measurements place the star at a distance of 551 light years, and it is currently receding with a heliocentric radial velocity of 10 km/s.

Lambda Dor has a stellar classification of either G6 or G8 III, depending on the source. Nevertheless, both indicate that it is a red giant, and it is currently on the red giant branch fusing hydrogen in a shell outside a helium core. At present it has 3.82 times the mass of the Sun and at an age of 258 million years, it has expanded to a radius of 21.2 R_{☉}. It radiates at over 250 times the luminosity of the Sun from its photosphere at an effective temperature of 5,009 K. Lambda Dor is slightly metal deficient, with an iron abundance 12% below solar levels. It currently spins with a projected rotational velocity of 5.2 km/s.
