= G Doradus =

Binary star in Dorado

- Location of G Doradus on the map (circled)

Observation data Epoch J2000.0 Equinox J2000.0 (ICRS)
- Constellation: Dorado
- Right ascension: 05^{h} 32^{m} 59.56572^{s}
- Declination: −64° 13′ 39.0537″
- Apparent magnitude (V): 5.34±0.01

Characteristics
- Spectral type: G8/K0 III
- U−B color index: +0.85
- B−V color index: +1.04

Astrometry
Radial velocity (R_{v})	9.8±2.8 km/s
Proper motion (μ)	RA: +45.741 mas/yr Dec.: −3.051 mas/yr
Parallax (π)	13.9330±0.2335 mas
Distance	234 ± 4 ly (72 ± 1 pc)
Absolute magnitude (M_{V})	+1.08

Orbit
Period (P)	180.8757 d
Semi-major axis (a)	0.320 AU
Eccentricity (e)	0.509±0.010
Inclination (i)	52.2±5.2°
Longitude of the node (Ω)	45.4±6.6°
Periastron epoch (T)	2,423,108.42±0.65 JD
Argument of periastron (ω) (secondary)	332.93±1.61°
Semi-amplitude (K_{1}) (primary)	22.36±0.35 km/s

Details

A
Mass	3.47 M_{☉}
Radius	10.5^{+0.1}_{−0.2} R_{☉}
Luminosity	48.4^{+1.6}_{−1.5} L_{☉}
Surface gravity (log g)	2.61 cgs
Temperature	4819±123 K
Metallicity [Fe/H]	−0.20 dex
Rotational velocity (v sin i)	<1.0 km/s
Age	556^{+153}_{−188} Myr

B
Mass	1.87 M_{☉}

Other designations
- G Dor, 28 G. Doradus, CPD−64°456, FK5 2418, GC 6927, HD 37297, HIP 26001, HR 1917, SAO 249309, TIC 149304313

Database references
SIMBAD	data

G Doradus (HD 37297; HR 1917; 28 G. Doradus) is a spectroscopic binary located in the southern constellation Dorado, the dolphinfish. It has an apparent magnitude of 5.34, making it faintly visible to the naked eye under ideal conditions. The system is located relatively close at a distance of 234 light-years based on Gaia DR3 parallax measurements but it is receding with a heliocentric radial velocity of approximately 9.8 km/s. At its current distance, G Doradus' brightness is diminished by a quarter of a magnitude due to interstellar extinction and it has an absolute magnitude of +1.08. The designation "G Doradus" is not a Bayer designation assigned by Benjamin Gould or Lacaille; it arose from the Gould designation 28 G. Doradus.

The visible component has a stellar classification of G8/K0 III, indicating that it is an evolved star with the characteristics of a G8 and K0 giant star. It has 3.47 times the mass of the Sun but at the age of 556 million years, it has expanded to 10.5 times the radius of the Sun. It radiates 48.4 times the luminosity of the Sun from its enlarged photosphere at an effective temperature of 4,819 K, giving it an orangish-yellow hue when viewed in the night sky. G Doradus is slightly metal deficient with an iron abundance of [Fe/H] = −0.20 and it spins too slowly for its projected rotational velocity to be measured accurately.

G Doradus is a single-lined spectroscopic binary; the components – which have a separation of 0.32 AU – take 181 days to circle each other in an elliptical orbit, but the orbit is not well constrained. Although only the primary can be observed in the spectrum, the masses of both components can be determined. Krachieva et al. (1980) derives a mass of 1.87 M_{☉} for the companion, which might be an A-type star.
