= HD 28254 b =

Extrasolar planet in the constellation Dorado

Discovery
- Discovered by: Naef et al.
- Discovery site: La Silla Observatory
- Discovery date: October 19, 2009
- Detection method: radial velocity (HARPS)

Orbital characteristics
- Apastron: 4.78 AU
- Periastron: 0.12 AU
- Semi-major axis: 2.45+0.03 −0.04 AU
- Eccentricity: 0.95+0.03 −0.04
- Orbital period (sidereal): 1,333±4 d 3.65±0.01 yr
- Inclination: 21°+38° −11° or 162°+7° −27°
- Longitude of ascending node: 248°+53° −33° or 163°+38° −36°
- Time of periastron: 2,454,246+9 −10 JD
- Argument of periastron: 289°+20° −18°
- Semi-amplitude: 37.3+5.1 −0.9 m/s
- Star: HD 28254

Physical characteristics
- Mass: 3.8+3.0 −2.2 M_{J}
- Temperature: 207+13 −40 K

HD 28254 b (also known as HIP 20606 b) is an exoplanet which orbits the G-type main sequence star HD 28254, located 180 light-years away in the constellation Dorado.

== Discovery ==
The planet was discovered in a survey by HARPS along with 29 other planets in 2009.

== Properties ==
Due to the planet's high mass, it is assumed to be a gas giant like Jupiter. Since HD 28254 b was detected indirectly, properties such as its inclination, radius, and temperature are unknown. HD 28254 takes about 3 years to orbit its host and has one of the most eccentric orbits around a star. In 2023, the inclination and true mass of HD 28254 b were measured via astrometry, though the mass remains uncertain - it is between about 1.6 and 6.8 times the mass of Jupiter.
