= Nu Doradus =

Star in the constellation Dorado

Observation data Epoch J2000.0 Equinox J2000.0 (ICRS)
- Constellation: Dorado
- Right ascension: 06^{h} 08^{m} 44.26178^{s}
- Declination: −68° 50′ 36.2824″
- Apparent magnitude (V): 5.06

Characteristics
- Evolutionary stage: main sequence
- Spectral type: B8 V
- U−B color index: −0.19
- B−V color index: −0.08

Astrometry
Radial velocity (R_{v})	+17.5 km/s
Proper motion (μ)	RA: −51.204 mas/yr Dec.: +19.086 mas/yr
Parallax (π)	11.5734±0.0820 mas
Distance	282 ± 2 ly (86.4 ± 0.6 pc)
Absolute magnitude (M_{V})	+0.24

Details
Mass	2.73 M_{☉}
Radius	3.2 R_{☉}
Luminosity	107 L_{☉}
Surface gravity (log g)	4.01±0.14 cgs
Temperature	11,381±387 K
Rotation	1.40032 d
Rotational velocity (v sin i)	98 km/s
Age	118 Myr

Other designations
- ν Dor, CPD−68°474, FK5 1166, HD 43107, HIP 29134, HR 2221, SAO 249461

Database references
SIMBAD	data

Nu Doradus is a single, blue-white hued star in the southern constellation of Dorado. Its name is a Bayer designation that is Latinized from ν Doradus and abbreviated Nu Dor or ν Dor. This star is visible to the naked eye with an apparent visual magnitude of +5.06. Based upon an annual parallax shift of 11.6 mas as seen from Earth, it is located about 282 light years from the Sun. At that distance, the visual magnitude is diminished by an extinction of 0.07 due to interstellar dust. It is drifting further from the Sun with a heliocentric radial velocity of +17.5 km/s.

This is an ordinary B-type main-sequence star, as indicated by its stellar classification of B8 V. It is an estimated 118 million years old and is spinning rapidly with a projected rotational velocity of 98 km/s. The star has 2.7 times the mass of the Sun and about 3.2 times the Sun's radius. It is radiating 107 times the Sun's luminosity from its photoshere at an effective temperature of 11,381 K. No infrared excess has been detected.
