= WZ Doradus =

Semiregular variable in Dorado

- Location of WZ Doradus on the map (circled)

Observation data Epoch J2000.0 Equinox ICRS
- Constellation: Dorado
- Right ascension: 05^{h} 07^{m} 34.02686^{s}
- Declination: −63° 23′ 58.8474″
- Apparent magnitude (V): 5.20 - 5.32

Characteristics
- Evolutionary stage: AGB
- Spectral type: M3 III
- U−B color index: +1.85
- B−V color index: +1.65
- Variable type: SRb

Astrometry
Radial velocity (R_{v})	19.3±2.8 km/s
Proper motion (μ)	RA: +13.210 mas/yr Dec.: −44.813 mas/yr
Parallax (π)	5.6282±0.1116 mas
Distance	580 ± 10 ly (178 ± 4 pc)
Absolute magnitude (M_{V})	−1.00

Details
Mass	1.4 M_{☉}
Radius	88.3^{+6.6}_{−10.0} R_{☉}
Luminosity	1,248±47 L_{☉}
Surface gravity (log g)	0.50 cgs
Temperature	3,603±125 K

Other designations
- 21 G. Doradus, WZ Dor, CD−63°188, CPD−63°420, FK5 2389, GC 6314, HD 33684, HIP 23840, HR 1695, SAO 249198, TIC 55298910

Database references
SIMBAD	data

WZ Doradus (HD 33684; HR 1695; 21 G. Doradus) is a solitary red-hued variable star located in the southern constellation Dorado. It has an average apparent magnitude of 5.21, making it faintly visible to the naked eye under ideal conditions. Gaia DR3 parallax measurements imply a distance of 580 light-years and it is currently receding with a heliocentric radial velocity of 19.3 km/s. At its current distance, WZ Doradus is diminished by two-tenths of a magnitude due to interstellar extinction and it has an absolute magnitude of −1.00.

HD 33684 was first observed to vary in brightness by astronomer P. M. Corben in 1971. It was said to have an amplitude of 0.18 magnitudes. A year later, HD 33684 was given the variable star designation WZ Doradus. It was again observed in 1973 by Olin J. Eggen and he noticed that it varied within 40 days. A 1998 survey found no strong emissions indicating dust around the star. Another survey also found no technetium in its spectrum. WZ Doradus is a semiregular variable of subtype SRb that varies between 5.2 and 5.32 within an average period of 40 days. Tabur et al. (2009) found two periods for the star after it was widely believed to only have one period.

WZ Doradus variability periods
Amplitude (mag)	Period (days)
0.042	26.0
0.026	44.6

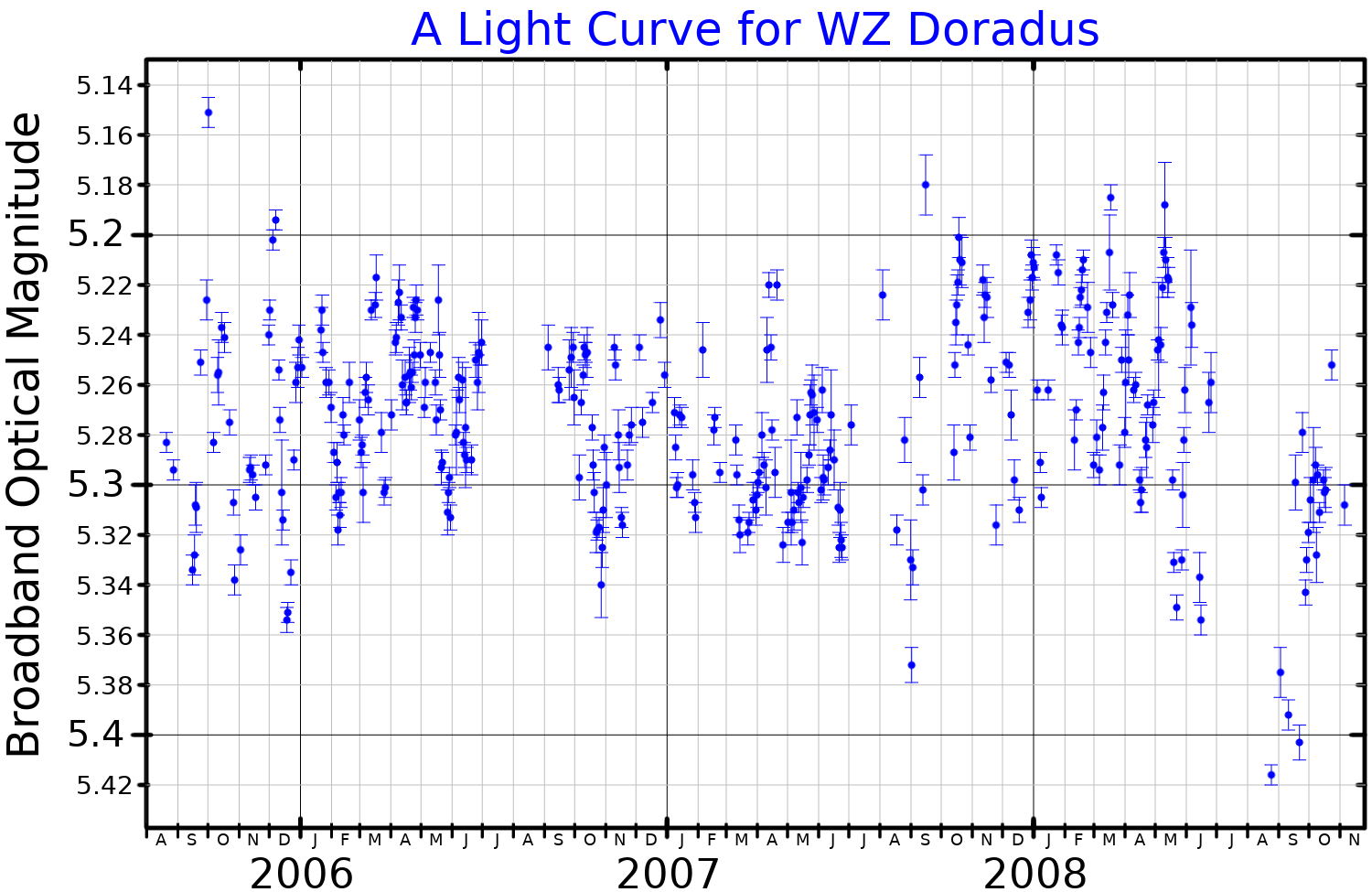
A light curve for WZ Doradus, plotted from data published by Tabur et al.

WZ Doradus has a stellar classification of M3 III, indicating that it is an evolved red giant. It is currently on the asymptotic giant branch, generating energy via the fusion of hydrogen and helium shells around an inert carbon core. As a result of its evolved state, it has expanded to 88.3 times the radius of the Sun and it now radiates 1,248 times the luminosity of the Sun from its enlarged photosphere at an effective temperature of 3,603 K.
