= HD 30177 =

Star in the constellation Dorado

Observation data Epoch J2000.0 Equinox ICRS
- Constellation: Dorado
- Right ascension: 04^{h} 41^{m} 54.374^{s}
- Declination: −58° 01′ 14.73″
- Apparent magnitude (V): 8.41

Characteristics
- Evolutionary stage: main sequence
- Spectral type: G8V
- B−V color index: 0.773±0.015

Astrometry
Radial velocity (R_{v})	62.697±0.0013 km/s
Proper motion (μ)	RA: 66.303±0.023 mas/yr Dec.: −11.795±0.024 mas/yr
Parallax (π)	18.0190±0.0195 mas
Distance	181.0 ± 0.2 ly (55.50 ± 0.06 pc)
Absolute magnitude (M_{V})	4.72±0.09

Details
Mass	1.053±0.023 M_{☉}
Radius	1.019±0.034 R_{☉}
Luminosity	1.04±0.01 L_{☉}
Surface gravity (log g)	4.417±0.034 cgs
Temperature	5,680±56 K
Metallicity [Fe/H]	0.43±0.04 dex
Rotation	~45 d
Rotational velocity (v sin i)	2.96±0.50 km/s
Age	3.6+2.5 −2.2 Gyr

Other designations
- CD−58°984, HD 30177, HIP 21850, SAO 233633, 2MASS J04415438-5801146

Database references
SIMBAD	data

HD 30177 is a single star with a pair of orbiting exoplanets in the southern constellation Dorado. Based on parallax measurements, it is located at a distance of 181 light years from the Sun. It has an absolute magnitude of 4.72, but at that distance the star is too faint to be viewed by the naked eye with an apparent visual magnitude of 8.41. The star is drifting further away with a radial velocity of 62.7 km/s.

The spectrum of HD 30177 matches a late G-type main-sequence star with a stellar classification of G8V. It is a yellow dwarf with a mass and radius similar to the Sun that is fusing hydrogen in its core. The chromosphere shows a negligible level of magnetic activity. The abundance of iron, an indicator of the star's metallicity, is more than double the Sun's. It is radiating a similar luminosity to the Sun from its photosphere at an effective temperature of 5,607 K.

A 2024 multiplicity survey, using astrometry from the Gaia spacecraft, identified a proper motion companion to HD 30177. This co-moving companion is a red dwarf star, around 10% the mass of the Sun, is located at 780" from HD 30177 with a position angle of 188°. The angular distance translates to an observed separation of 43,300 astronomical units.

== Planetary system ==
The Anglo-Australian Planet Search team announced the discovery of HD 30177 b, which has a minimum mass 8 times that of Jupiter, on June 13, 2002. The scientific paper describing the discovery was published in The Astrophysical Journal in 2003. A second massive gas giant planet was later discovered in an approximately 32 year orbit. In 2022, the inclination and estimated mass of both planets were measured via astrometry, figures which were updated in a 2026 publication.

The HD 30177 planetary system
Companion (in order from star)	Mass	Semimajor axis (AU)	Orbital period (days)	Eccentricity	Inclination (°)	Radius
b	8.25+1.05 −0.85 M_{J}	3.49+0.18 −0.14	2,539+1 −3	0.186+0.002 −0.004	65.5+1.7 −4.2	—
c	4.67+0.44 −0.43 M_{J}	9.90+0.29 −0.62	11,320+490 −940	0.21+0.01 −0.02	72.7+17.8 −5.8	—

== See also ==
- List of extrasolar planets
- Pi Mensae
