= HD 30177 b =

Extrasolar planet in the constellation Dorado

Discovery
- Discovered by: Tinney, Butler, Marcy et al.
- Discovery site: Anglo-Australian Planet Search
- Discovery date: June 13, 2002
- Detection method: radial velocity

Orbital characteristics
- Semi-major axis: 3.604+0.135 −0.147 AU
- Eccentricity: 0.207+0.012 −0.017
- Orbital period (sidereal): 6.884+0.014 −0.012 yr
- Inclination: 85.393°+14.354° −18.742°
- Longitude of ascending node: 311.232°+65.057° −148.076°
- Time of periastron: 2448895.006+28.802 −21.419 JD
- Argument of periastron: 25.044°+5.476° −2.875°
- Semi-amplitude: 128.935+2.386 −2.245 m/s
- Star: HD 30177

Physical characteristics
- Mass: 8.403+1.241 −0.489 M_{J}

HD 30177 b is an extrasolar planet located approximately 181.6 light-years away in the constellation of Dorado, orbiting the star HD 30177.

== Discovery ==
This planet was discovered on June 13, 2002 by Tinney, Butler, and Marcy et al. using the Doppler spectroscopy from the Anglo-Australian Telescope.

== Properties ==
This is one of the most massive planets ever detected by the radial velocity method. In addition, the planet orbits far from the star, about 4 AU away, taking 2770 days (7.58 years) to orbit the star. Even though the massive planet is orbiting at 4 AU from the star, the radial velocity semi-amplitude is high, around 146.8±2.8 m/s. In 2022, the inclination and true mass of HD 30177 b were measured via astrometry, showing the true mass to be close to the minimum mass.

== See also ==
- Pi Mensae b
