= HD 36584 =

Visual binary in Dorado

- Location of HD 36584 on the map (circled)

Observation data Epoch J2000.0 Equinox ICRS
- Constellation: Dorado
- A
- Right ascension: 05^{h} 26^{m} 59.80322^{s}
- Declination: −68° 37′ 21.1327″
- Apparent magnitude (V): 6.62±0.01
- B
- Right ascension: 05^{h} 26^{m} 59.87970^{s}
- Declination: −68° 37′ 22.4439″
- Apparent magnitude (V): 6.91±0.01

Characteristics
- Spectral type: F0 IV/V

A
- Evolutionary stage: main sequence
- B−V color index: +0.37

B
- Evolutionary stage: main sequence
- B−V color index: +0.40

Astrometry
Radial velocity (R_{v})	−4.60±3.4 km/s
Absolute magnitude (M_{V})	+1.57

A
Proper motion (μ)	RA: −10.638 mas/yr Dec.: −17.846 mas/yr
Parallax (π)	12.4037±0.0261 mas
Distance	263.0 ± 0.6 ly (80.6 ± 0.2 pc)

B
Proper motion (μ)	RA: −4.710 mas/yr Dec.: −19.675 mas/yr
Parallax (π)	12.4171±0.0384 mas
Distance	262.7 ± 0.8 ly (80.5 ± 0.2 pc)

Orbit
Period (P)	795 yr
Semi-major axis (a)	1.704″
Eccentricity (e)	0.887
Inclination (i)	129.5°
Longitude of the node (Ω)	74.8°
Periastron epoch (T)	2,403,927.97472 JD
Argument of periastron (ω) (secondary)	112.8°

Details

A
Mass	1.69 M_{☉}
Radius	2.4 R_{☉}
Luminosity	11.2 L_{☉}
Surface gravity (log g)	3.67 cgs
Temperature	6,800 K

B
Mass	1.57 M_{☉}
Radius	2.2 R_{☉}
Luminosity	8.3 L_{☉}
Temperature	6,604 K

Other designations
- 24 G. Doradus, CD−68°308, CPD−68°375, GC 6795, HD 36584, HIP 25482, HR 1859, SAO 249281, CCDM J05270-6837AB, WDS J05270-6837AB

Database references
SIMBAD	the system
- A
- B

HD 36584 (HR 1859; 24 G. Doradus) is a visual binary located in the southern constellation Dorado. The primary has an apparent magnitude of 6.62 and the secondary has an apparent magnitude of 6.91, making both stars visible in a telescope but not to the naked eye. The system is located relatively close at a distance of 263 light-years based on Gaia DR3 parallax measurements and it is drifting closer with a heliocentric radial velocity of −4.6 km/s. The system has a combined absolute magnitude of 1.57.

HD 36584 was first discovered to be a double star in 1898 by astronomer R.T.A Innes. At the time of discovery, the components had a separation of only half an arcsecond and the secondary was located at a position angle of 210°. The separation between the components increased to 1.34" and the position angle of the secondary shifted to 162° in 1997. At this separation, the components can be resolved in an amateur telescope, but the individual characteristics of both stars cannot be studied. As of 2015, the secondary is located at a distance of 1.4" along a position angle of 159°. The two stars take about 795 years to circle each other in a very eccentric orbit.

The system has a combined stellar classification of F0 IV/V, indicating that it is an evolved F-type star that has the blended luminosity class of a subgiant and main sequence star. The components have masses 1.69 and 1.57 times that of the Sun respectively.
