= HD 28254 =

Star in the constellation Dorado

Observation data Epoch J2000.0 Equinox ICRS
- Constellation: Dorado
- Right ascension: 04^{h} 24^{m} 50.705^{s}
- Declination: −50° 37′ 19.88″
- Apparent magnitude (V): 7.69

Characteristics
- Evolutionary stage: subgiant
- Spectral type: G1IV/V
- Apparent magnitude (B): 8.412
- Apparent magnitude (R): 7.70
- Apparent magnitude (J): 6.395±0.026
- Apparent magnitude (H): 6.133±0.031
- Apparent magnitude (K): 6.006±0.029
- B−V color index: 0.722
- V−R color index: 0.01

Astrometry
Radial velocity (R_{v})	−9.315±0.002 km/s
Proper motion (μ)	RA: −67.277 mas/yr Dec.: −143.680 mas/yr
Parallax (π)	18.1242±0.0247 mas
Distance	180.0 ± 0.2 ly (55.17 ± 0.08 pc)
Absolute magnitude (M_{V})	4.001

Details
Mass	1.11±0.01 M_{☉}
Radius	1.57±0.02 R_{☉}
Luminosity	2.19±0.01 L_{☉}
Surface gravity (log g)	4.08±0.02 cgs
Temperature	5,607±37 K
Metallicity [Fe/H]	0.36±0.03 dex
Rotational velocity (v sin i)	2.50±1.0 km/s
Age	7.8±0.4 Gyr

Other designations
- CD−50°1385, GC 5376, HD 28254, HIP 20606, SAO 233508, PPM 333464

Database references
SIMBAD	A
- B
Exoplanet Archive	data

HD 28254 is a binary star system located 180 light-years away in the constellation Dorado. The primary component is an 8th magnitude G-type main-sequence star. This star is larger, cooler, brighter, and more massive than the Sun, and its metal content is 2.3 times as much as the Sun. In 2009, a gas giant exoplanet was found in orbit around the star.

== Properties ==
HD 28254 is a G-type star with a spectral type G1IV/V, indicating that it has begun its evolution off the main sequence. It is estimated to have a mass 11% larger than the Sun's, a radius 57% larger, and an age around 7.8 billion years. It has a luminosity of 1.57 times the solar luminosity and an effective temperature of about 5,600 K. HD 28254 has a low activity level and a larger metallicity than the Sun, with 2.3 times the solar iron abundance.

HD 28254 is the brighter component of a visual binary. Its companion, HD 28254 B, has a visual apparent magnitude of 13.8 and is located at a separation of 4.3 arcseconds. The two stars have maintained the same separation through time, indicating that they form a physical binary system. Furthermore, the radial velocity of the primary shows signs of orbital motion. From its brightness, the companion star is probably a red dwarf with spectral type between M0V and M2V, with about 48% the solar mass. The projected separation between the stars is 235 AU, corresponding to an orbital period of more than 1,000 years.

== Planetary system ==
In 2010, the discovery of an exoplanet orbiting HD 28254 was published. It was detected by Doppler spectroscopy from observations with the HARPS spectrograph between October 2003 and April 2009. The best fit model for the 32 radial velocity data obtained consists of a planet in an eccentric 1116 days orbit, plus a quadratic trend that is probably caused by the star HD 28254 B.

The planet is a gas giant with a minimum mass of 1.16 times the mass of Jupiter. It is at a mean distance of 2.15 AU from the star, and takes 1116 days to complete an orbit. Its orbit has a very high eccentricity of 0.81, carrying the planet between 0.41 and 3.90 AU from the star. This can be the result of gravitational interactions with the secondary star via the Kozai mechanism. In 2023, the inclination and true mass of HD 28254 b were measured via astrometry, though the mass remains uncertain - it is between about 1.6 and 6.8 times the mass of Jupiter.

The HD 28254 planetary system
Companion (in order from star)	Mass	Semimajor axis (AU)	Orbital period (days)	Eccentricity	Inclination (°)	Radius
b	3.8+3.0 −2.2 M_{J}	2.45+0.03 −0.04	1333±4	0.95+0.03 −0.04	21+38 −11 or 162+7 −27	—

== See also ==
- List of exoplanets
