= RCW 49 =

H II region in the constellation Carina

Emission nebula
- H II region
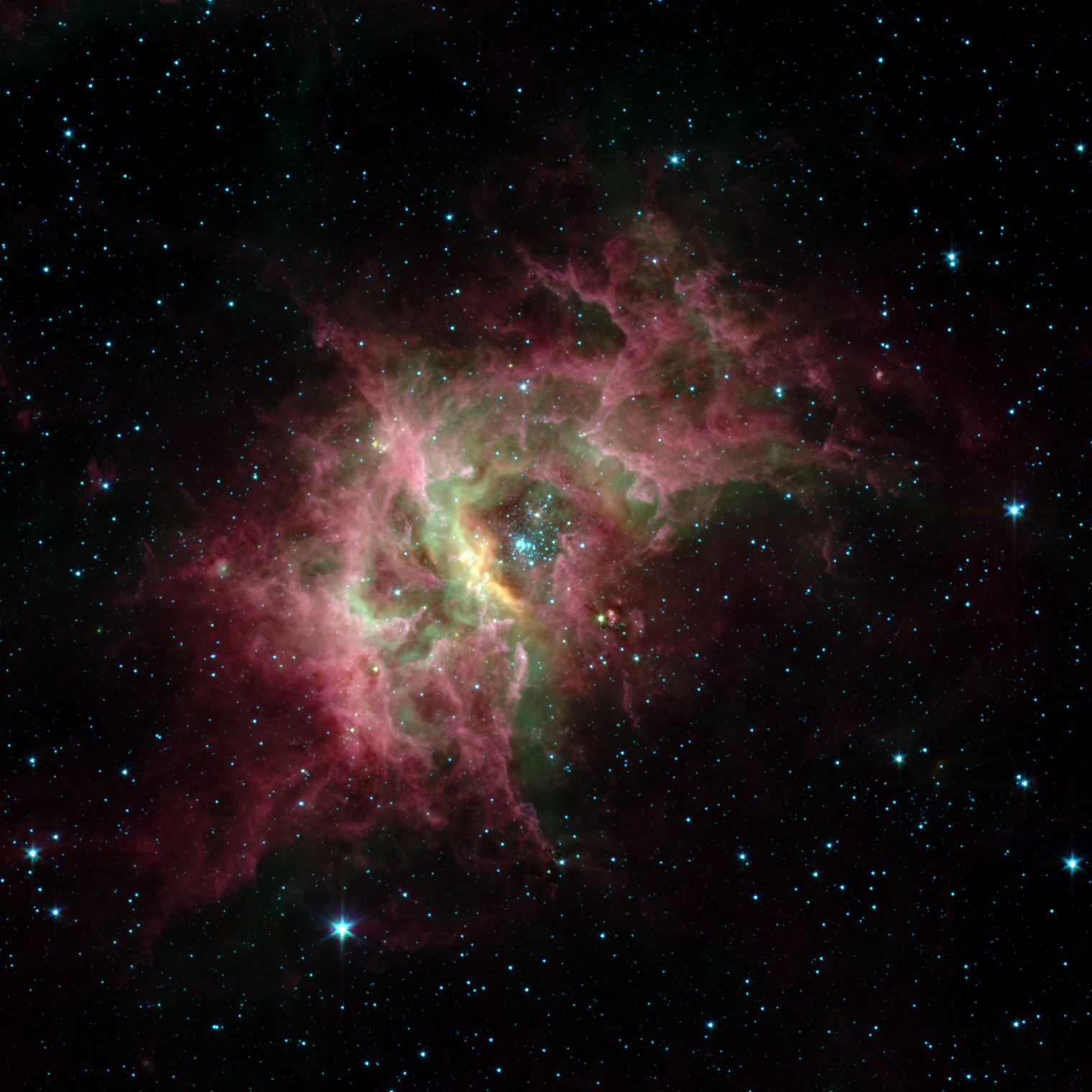
- RCW 49 by the Spitzer Space Telescope

Observation data: J2000.0 epoch
- Right ascension: 10^{h} 24^{m} 14.6^{s}
- Declination: −57° 46′ 58″
- Distance: 13,700 ly
- Constellation: Carina

Physical characteristics
- Radius: 150-200 ly
- Designations: RCW 49, GUM 29, NGC 3247

RCW 49, also known as NGC 3247, is a H II region nebula located 13,700 light years away. Other designations for the RCW 49 region include NGC 3247 and G29 and it is commonly known as the Whirling Dervish Nebula. It is a dusty stellar nursery that contains more than 2,200 stars and is about 300-400 light years across. RCW 49 is recognized as among the brightest and most massive HII regions.

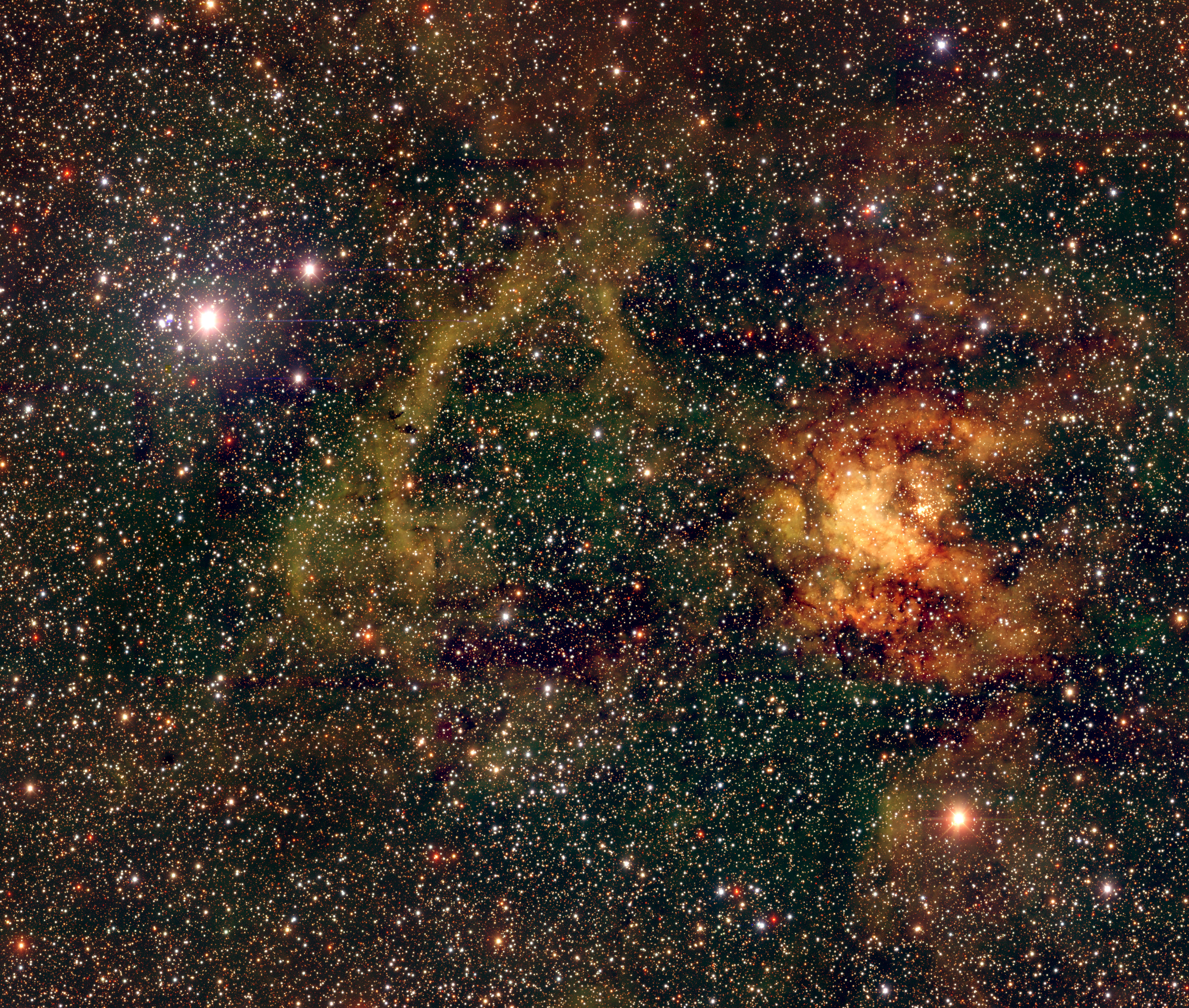
The Gum 29 Nebula (right side), containing Westerlund 2. On the upper-left side is the star cluster IC 2581.

In 2004, a 2003 image by the Spitzer Space Telescope was released showing the nebula in infrared wavelengths. This included an image showing the infrared colors mapped to visible light colors: 3.6 microns (blue), 4.5 microns (green), 5.8 microns (orange) and 8 microns (red). It was noted as being almost 14 thousand light years from Earth, and the infrared camera could detect the stars obscured by dust clouds. It was estimated at least 200 of the stars in the nebula have dust disks.

The results of observations of the Spitzer Telescope, including the IRAC camera, have been studied leading to the conclusion that the region is a star-forming region. In 2014, RCW 49 was identified as a bow shock candidate, along with M17 in a study of Extended Red Objects (ERO's) and Stellar Wind Bow Shocks in the Carina nebula.

== See also ==
- RCW Catalogue
- Gum Catalog
