= UBV Photoelectric Photometry Catalogue =

The UBV Photoelectric Photometry Catalogue, or UBV M, is the star brightness catalogue that complies to the UBV photometric system developed by astronomer Harold Johnson.

== Evolution of the UBV Photoelectric Photometry Catalogue ==
The early edition of 1968 by Blanco, sometimes referred as simply the "Photoelectric Catalogue" or UBV was replaced by the Mermilliod edition UBV M in 1987 and extended in 1993. As the atmospheric extinction problem associated with the UBV photometric system became evident, the UBV Photoelectric Photometry Catalogue was phased-out in 2000.
