= Alpha Doradus =

Star in the constellation Dorado

- Location of α Doradus (circled)

Observation data Epoch J2000 Equinox ICRS
- Constellation: Dorado
- A
- Right ascension: 04^{h} 33^{m} 59.778^{s}
- Declination: −55° 02′ 41.91″
- Apparent magnitude (V): 3.8
- B
- Right ascension: 04^{h} 33^{m} 59.782^{s}
- Declination: −55° 02′ 42.39″
- Apparent magnitude (V): 4.3

Characteristics
- U−B color index: −0.35
- B−V color index: −0.10
- R−I color index: −0.09

A
- Spectral type: A0IIIp
- Variable type: ACV

B
- Spectral type: B9IV

Astrometry

A
| Radial velocity (R_{v}) | 25.6 ± 0.9 km/s |
| Proper motion (μ) | RA: 58.06 mas/yr Dec.: 12.73 mas/yr |
| Parallax (π) | 19.34±0.31 mas |
| Distance | 169 ± 3 ly (51.7 ± 0.8 pc) |

B
| Proper motion (μ) | RA: 42.83 mas/yr Dec.: 12.94 mas/yr |

Orbit
| Period (P) | 12.1 y |
| Semi-major axis (a) | 0.18″ |
| Eccentricity (e) | 0.80 |
| Inclination (i) | 31° |
| Longitude of the node (Ω) | 140° |
| Periastron epoch (T) | B1986 |
| Argument of periastron (ω) (secondary) | 193° |

Details

A
| Mass | 3.33 ± 0.10 M_{☉} |
| Radius | 3.5 ± 0.3 R_{☉} |
| Luminosity (bolometric) | 195 L_{☉} |
| Surface gravity (log g) | 4.02 ± 0.07 cgs |
| Temperature | 11,588 K |
| Rotation | 2.94 days |

B
| Mass | 2.7 M_{☉} |
| Radius | 1.9 R_{☉} |
| Luminosity (bolometric) | 70 L_{☉} |
| Temperature | 12,200 K |

Other designations
- α Dor, Alpha Doradus, Alpha Dor, CD−55 916, CPD−55 663, FK5 171, GC 5600, HD 29305, HIP 21281, HR 1465, SAO 233564, PPM 333592, CCDM J04340-5503AB, WDS 04340-5503AB

Database references
| SIMBAD | data |

Alpha Doradus is a binary star system in the southern constellation of Dorado. Its name is a Bayer designation that is Latinized from α Doradus and abbreviated Alpha Dor or α Dor. This system has an overall apparent visual magnitude that varies between 3.26 and 3.30, making it visible to the naked eye and the brightest star in the constellation. The distance to this system, as measured using the parallax method, is about 169 light-years (52 parsecs).

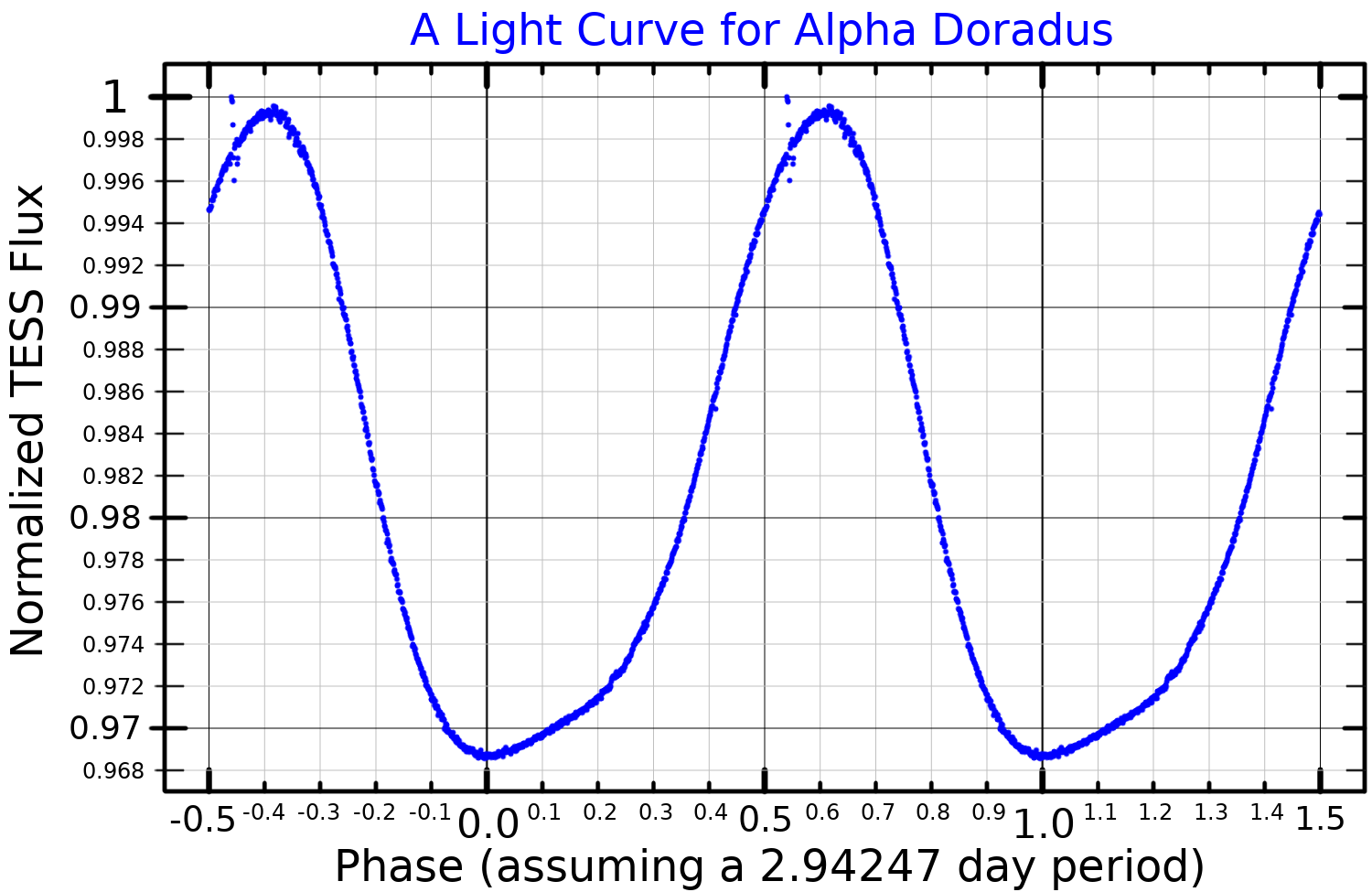
A light curve for Alpha Doradus, plotted from TESS data

Both components are evolved stars; the primary, component A, is a giant star with a stellar classification of A0IIIp, while the secondary is a hotter but lower mass subgiant of class B9IV. They revolve around each other in an eccentric orbit with a period of about 12 years. The orbital separation varies from 2 astronomical units at periastron to 17.5 astronomical units at apastron. The primary is a chemically peculiar star whose atmosphere displays an abnormally high abundance of silicon, making this an Si star.

Alpha Doradus has an optical companion, CCDM J04340-5503C, located 77 arcseconds away along a position angle of 94°. It has no physical relation to the other two stars.
