= Pi1 Doradus =

K-type giant in the constellation Dorado

π^{1} Doradus
- Location of π^{1} Doradus on the map (circled)

Observation data Epoch J2000.0 Equinox ICRS
- Constellation: Dorado
- Right ascension: 06^{h} 22^{m} 38.27576^{s}
- Declination: −69° 59′ 02.5605″
- Apparent magnitude (V): 5.54±0.01

Characteristics
- Spectral type: K5 III
- U−B color index: +1.82
- B−V color index: +1.51

Astrometry
| Radial velocity (R_{v}) | 15.7±2.9 km/s |
| Proper motion (μ) | RA: +26.170 mas/yr Dec.: +34.330 mas/yr |
| Parallax (π) | 4.9606±0.0769 mas |
| Distance | 660 ± 10 ly (202 ± 3 pc) |
| Absolute magnitude (M_{V}) | −0.83 |

Details
| Mass | 1.67 M_{☉} |
| Radius | 56.5±2.9 R_{☉} |
| Luminosity | 530±12 L_{☉} |
| Surface gravity (log g) | 1.41 cgs |
| Temperature | 4,019^{+3}_{−4} K |
| Metallicity [Fe/H] | +0.10 dex |
| Rotational velocity (v sin i) | 1.8±1.4 km/s |
| Age | 2.67 Gyr |

Other designations
- π^{1} Dor, 38 G. Doradus, CPD−69°607, GC 8310, HD 45669, HIP 30321, HR 2352, SAO 249532, TIC 167088607

Database references
| SIMBAD | data |

Pi^{1} Doradus is a solitary star located in the southern constellation of Dorado near the southwestern border with Mensa. Its name is a Bayer designation that was Latinized from π^{1} Doradus and abbreviated Pi^{1} Dor or π^{1} Dor. This star is faintly visible to the naked eye as an orange-hued point of light with an apparent magnitude of 5.54. Gaia DR3 parallax measurements provide a distance estimate of 660 light-years and it is currently receding with a heliocentric radial velocity of 15.7 km/s. At its current distance, Pi^{1} Doradus' brightness is diminished by 0.24 magnitudes due to interstellar extinction and it has an absolute magnitude of −0.83.

Pi^{1} Doradus has a stellar classification of K5 III, indicating that it is an evolved K-type giant star. It has 1.67 times the mass of the Sun but at the age of 2.67 billion years, it has expanded to 56.5 times the radius of the Sun. It radiates 530 times the luminosity of the Sun from its enlarged photosphere at an effective temperature 4,019 K Gaia DR3 stellar evolution models give a larger radius of 63.2 R_{☉} and a higher luminosity of 938 L_{☉}. Pi^{1} Doradus is metal enriched with an iron abundance of [Fe/H] = +0.10 or 126% that of the Sun's. Like many giant stars it spins slowly—having a projected rotational velocity of 1.8 km/s.
