= Pi2 Doradus =

G-type giant in the constellation Dorado

π^{2} Doradus
- Location of π^{2} Doradus on the map (circled)

Observation data Epoch J2000.0 Equinox ICRS
- Constellation: Dorado
- Right ascension: 06^{h} 25^{m} 28.63069^{s}
- Declination: −69° 42′ 25.0800″
- Apparent magnitude (V): 5.38

Characteristics
- Evolutionary stage: horizontal branch
- Spectral type: G8 III
- U−B color index: +0.67
- B−V color index: +0.97

Astrometry
Radial velocity (R_{v})	9.1±2.8 km/s
Proper motion (μ)	RA: −12.184 mas/yr Dec.: +200.786 mas/yr
Parallax (π)	11.7563±0.058 mas
Distance	277 ± 1 ly (85.1 ± 0.4 pc)
Absolute magnitude (M_{V})	+0.78

Details
Mass	1.80±0.07 M_{☉}
Radius	9.84±0.16 R_{☉}
Luminosity	51.1±1.1 L_{☉}
Surface gravity (log g)	2.66±0.08 cgs
Temperature	4,919±29 K
Metallicity [Fe/H]	−0.26±0.03 dex
Rotational velocity (v sin i)	<2.0 km/s
Age	1.61±0.15 Gyr

Other designations
- π^{2} Dor, 42 G. Doradus, CD−69°392, CPD−69°614, FK5 2495, GC 8390, HD 46116, HIP 30565, HR 2327, SAO 249550, TIC 167126852

Database references
SIMBAD	data

Pi^{2} Doradus is a solitary star located in the southern constellation Doradus. Its name is a Bayer designation that is Latinized from π^{2} Doradus and abbreviated Pi^{2} Dor or π^{2} Dor. This star is faintly visible to the naked eye as a yellow-hued point of light with an apparent magnitude of 5.38. The object is located relatively close at a distance of 277 light-years based on Gaia DR3 parallax measurements, but it is receding with a heliocentric radial velocity of approximately 9.1 km/s. At its current distance, Pi^{2} Doradus' brightness is diminished by 0.27 magnitudes due to interstellar extinction and it has an absolute magnitude of +0.78.

Pi^{2} Doradus has a stellar classification of G8 III, indicating that it is an evolved G-type giant star. It is a red clump star that is currently on the horizontal branch—fusing helium at its stellar core. It has 1.8 times the mass of the Sun but, at the age of 1.61 billion years, it has expanded to 9.84 times the radius of the Sun. It radiates 51.1 times the luminosity of the Sun from its photosphere at an effective temperature of 4,919 K Pi^{2} Doradus is metal deficient with an iron abundance of [Fe/H] = −0.26 or roughly 55% of the Sun's. Like many giant stars Pi^{2} Doradus spins slowly, having a projected rotational velocity lower than 2 km/s.
