= Heartbeat star =

Type of variable stellar binary

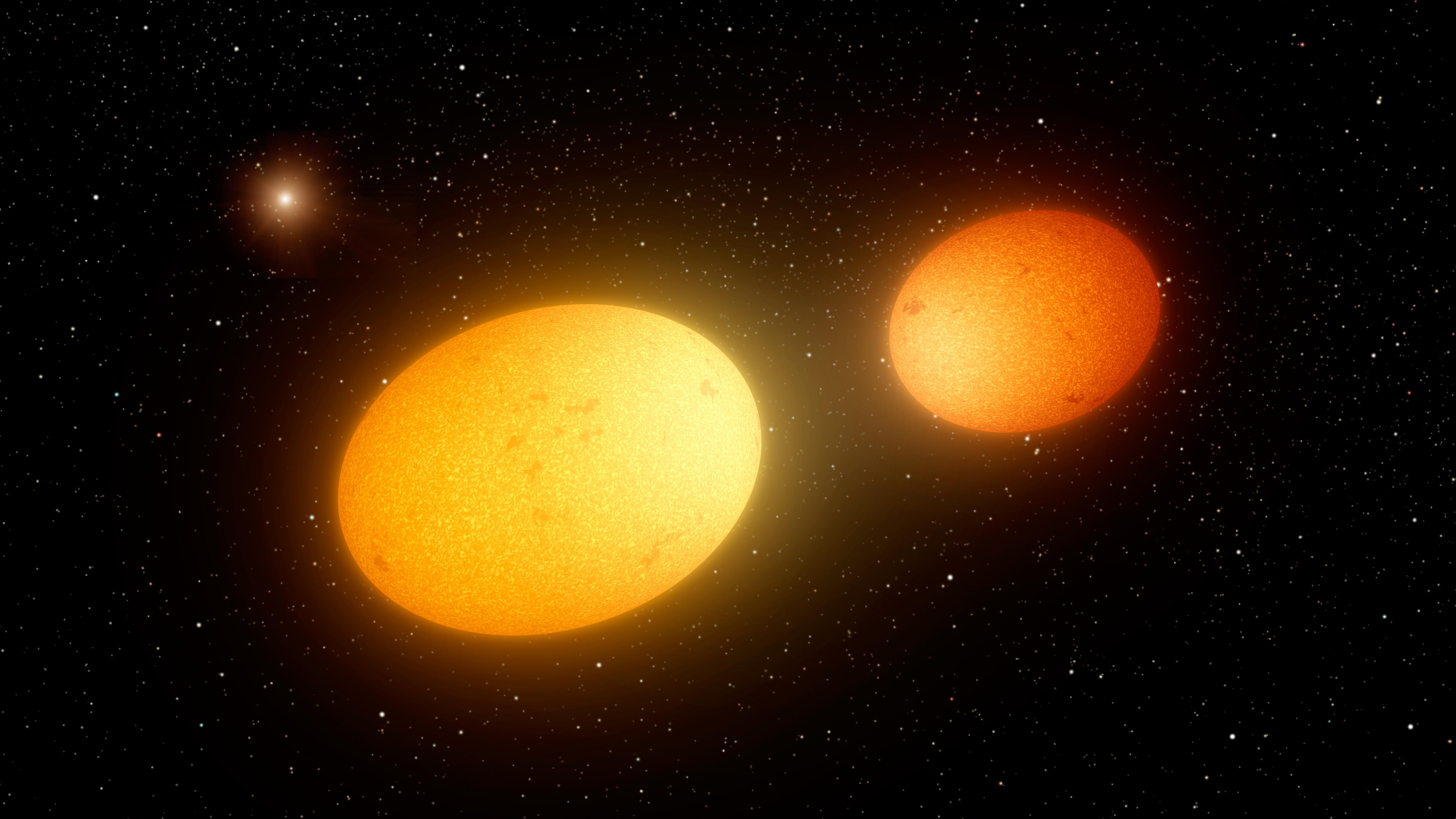
Artist's conception of two heartbeat stars and a companion star. (NASA/JPL-Caltech)

Heartbeat stars are variable binary star systems in eccentric orbits with vibrations caused by tidal forces. The name "heartbeat" comes from the similarity of the light curve of the star with what a heartbeat looks like through an electrocardiogram if their brightness was mapped over time. Many heartbeat stars have been discovered with the Kepler Space Telescope.

== Orbital information ==
Heartbeat stars are binary star systems where each star travels in a highly elliptical orbit around the common mass center, so that the separation of two stars varies from a few stellar radii to as much as 10 times that distance during one orbit. As the star with the more elliptical orbit swings closer to its companion, gravity will stretch the star into a non-spherical shape, changing its apparent light output. At their closest point in orbit, the tidal forces cause the shape of the heartbeat stars to fluctuate rapidly. When the stars reach the point of their closest encounter, the mutual gravitational pull between the two stars will cause them to become slightly ellipsoidal in shape, which is one of the reasons for their observed brightness being so variable.

== Discoveries ==
Heartbeat stars were studied for the first time on the basis of OGLE project observations. The Kepler Space Telescope with its long monitoring of the brightness of hundreds of thousands of stars enabled the discovery of many heartbeat stars. One of the first binary systems discovered to show the elliptical orbits, KOI-54, has been shown to increase in brightness every 41.8 days. A subsequent study in 2012 characterized 17 additional objects from the Kepler data and united them as a class of binary stars.

A study which measured the rotation rate of star spots on the surface of heartbeat stars showed that most heartbeat stars rotate slower than expected. A study which measured the orbits of 19 heartbeat star systems, found that surveyed heartbeat stars tend to be both bigger and hotter than the Sun.

The star HD 74423, discovered using NASA's Transiting Exoplanet Survey Satellite, was found to be unusually teardrop-shaped, which causes the star to pulsate only on one side, the first known heartbeat star to do so.
