= NGC 2040 =

Open star cluster in the constellation Dorado

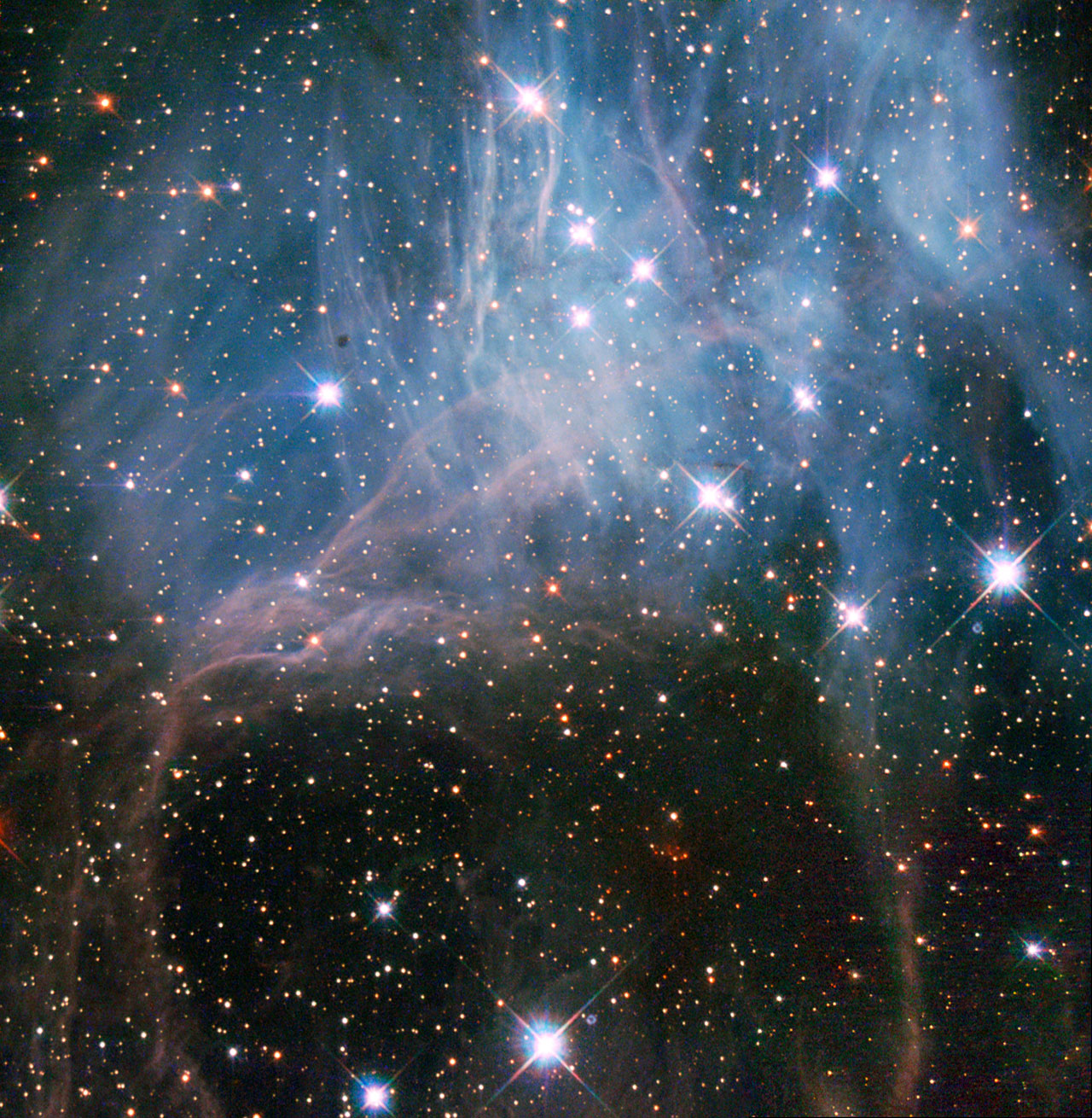
- NGC 2040 is a very loose star cluster whose stars have a common origin and are drifting together through space. Credit: ESA/Hubble, NASA and D. A Gouliermis.

Observation data (J2000 epoch)
- Right ascension: 05^{h} 36^{m} 00.7^{s}
- Declination: −67° 34′ 57″
- Distance: 160000 ly

Physical characteristics
- Other designations: ESO 56-164, LMC RASS 247, WHHW 0536.2-6737, CAL 60, LHA 120-N 59B, RX J0536.0-6735, [FHW95] LMC B0536-6735, 2E 1469, LH 88, RX J0536.0-6736, [FPH98] LMC 44, 2E 0536.2-6736, LI-LMC 1392, 1RXS J053602.3-673502, [HP99] 551

Associations
- Constellation: Dorado

NGC 2040 is an open star cluster located 160,000 light years away in the constellation of Dorado. It is a young group of stars in one of the largest star formation regions of the Large Magellanic Cloud.
