= N11 =

N11 or N-11 may refer to:

== Roads ==
- N11 (South Africa)
- N11 highway, Philippines
- N11 motorway (Netherlands)
- N11 road (Ghana)
- N11 road (Ireland)
- Nebraska Highway 11, United States
- Route nationale 11, France

== Other uses ==
- N11 (emission nebula)
- HMS Thorn (N11), a submarine of the Royal Navy
- Intel i860 XP, a microprocessor
- Interstitial nephritis
- LNER Class N11, a class of British steam locomotives
- London Buses route N11
- N11 code, special telephone numbers in the North American Numbering Plan
- Next eleven, a group of emerging economies proposed by Goldman Sachs
- Nieuport 11, a French World War I fighter
- Nissan Pulsar (N11), a Japanese car
- Nitrogen-11, an isotope of nitrogen
- North Springs station, a MARTA station in Sandy Springs, Georgia
- N11, a postcode district in the N postcode area of North London
