= NGC 1763 =

Emission nebula in the constellation Dorado

Emission nebula
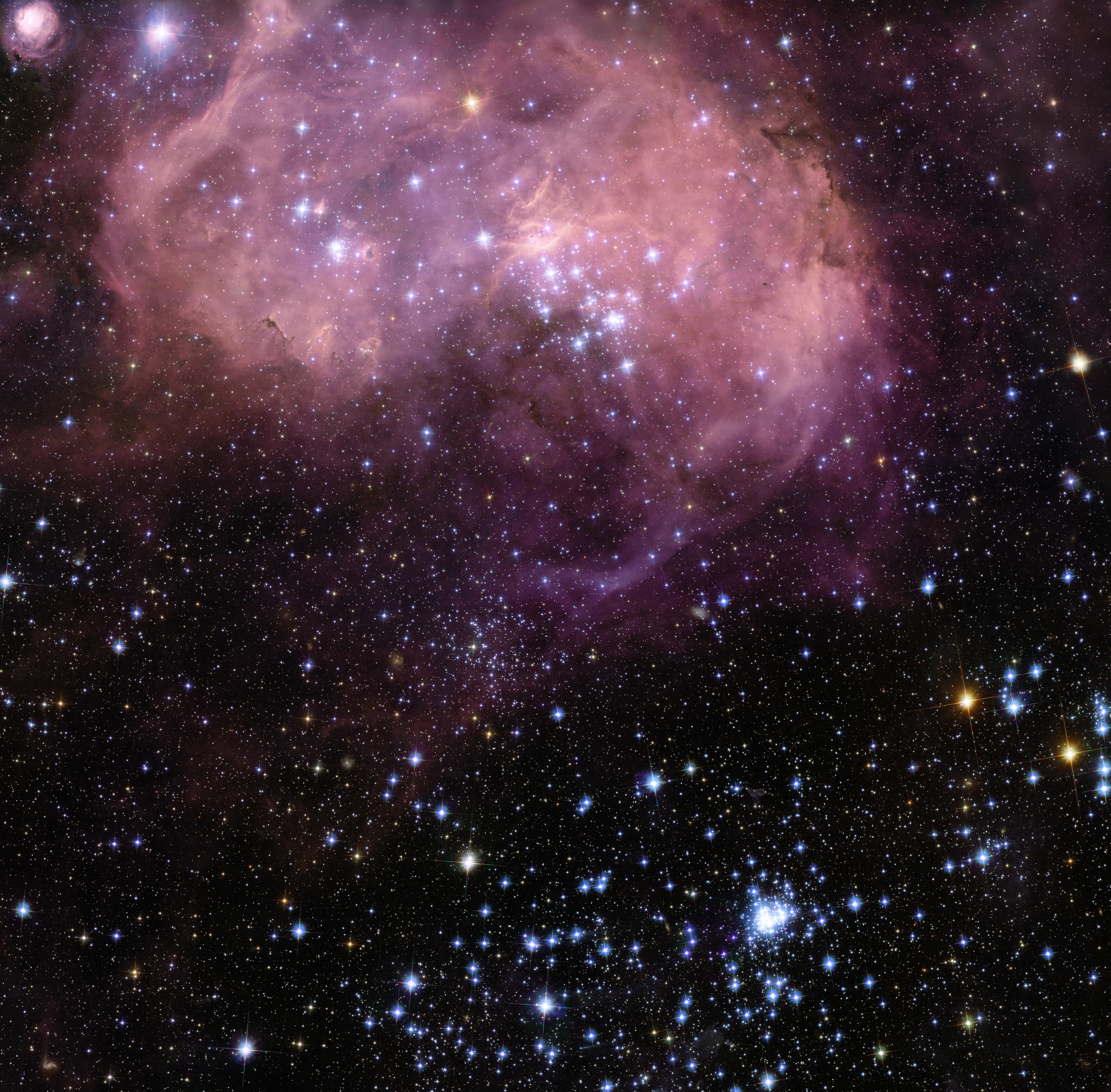
- NGC 1763 (emission nebula at the top) and NGC 1761 (star cluster at the bottom) from the Hubble Space Telescope

Observation data: epoch
- Right ascension: 04^{h} 56^{m} 51.5^{s}
- Declination: −66° 24′ 25″
- Constellation: Dorado
- Designations: LHA 120-N 11B, LH 10, ESO 85-EN20

NGC 1763 (also known as N11 B, LH 10 or ESO 85-EN20) is an emission nebula with an embedded star cluster in the constellation Dorado in the Large Magellanic Cloud. It is very bright, very large and very irregular. Its apparent size is about 3.0-5.0 arcmin. It is part of a large region of stars called LMC-N11 (N11) which was discovered with a 23-cm telescope by the astronomer James Dunlop in 1826 and was also observed by John Herschel in 1834. The nebula itself is catalogued under LHA 120-N 11B (N11 B), LH 10 or ESO 85-EN20. It is also part of an area commonly known as the Bean Nebula.

== See also ==
- List of most massive stars
