= NGC 1761 =

Open cluster in the constellation Dorado

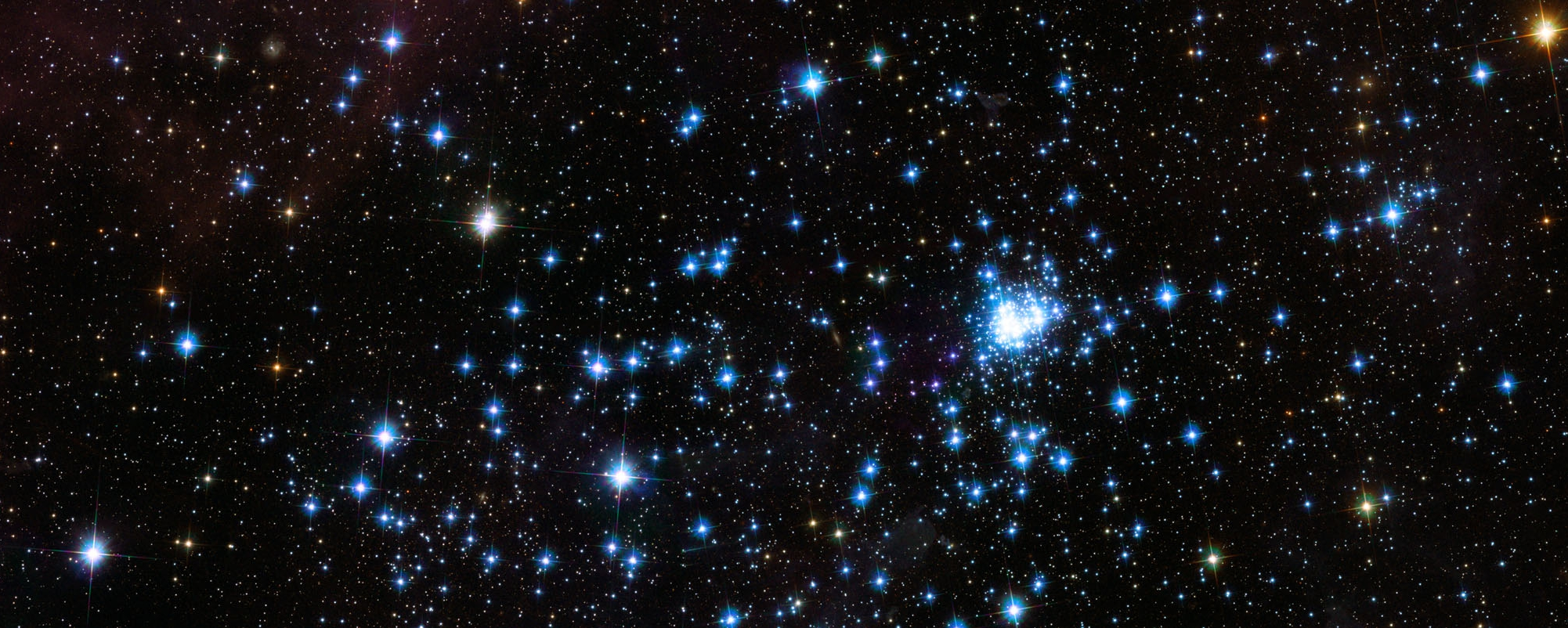
- An image of NGC 1761; Credit: James Dunlop / John Herschel

Observation data
- Right ascension: 04^{h} 56^{m} 37.7^{s}
- Declination: −66° 28′ 44″
- Absolute magnitude (V): 9.94

Physical characteristics
- Other designations: ESO 85-18, LH 9, SL63 122, GC 980, JH 2710, (possibly Dunlop 231)

Associations
- Constellation: Dorado

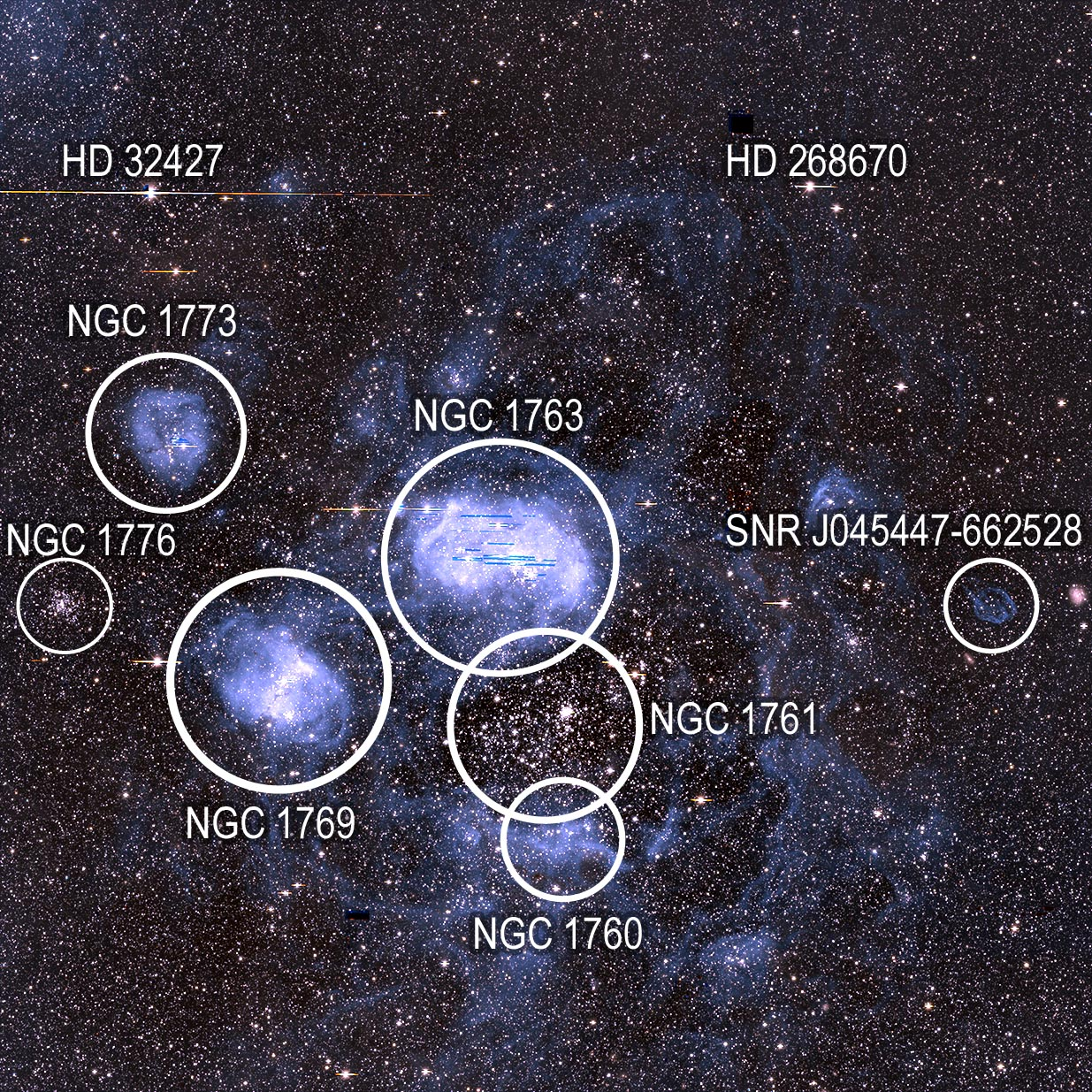
N11, containing NGC 1760, NGC 1761, NGC 1763, NGC 1769, NGC 1773, NGC 1776

NGC 1761 (also known as GC 980, JH 2710, LH 9) is an open cluster in the constellation Dorado in the Large Magellanic Cloud. It encompasses a group of about 50 massive hot young stars. These stars are among the largest stars known anywhere in the Universe and appear as bright blue-white in colour. The stars in turn have given birth to new stars within dark globules. NGC 1761 is particularly noteworthy for its intense ultraviolet radiation, which has eroded a large hole in the surrounding nebular material. It is similar in structure to the more famous Rosette Nebula.

It is part of a large region of stars called LMC-N11 (N11) which was discovered with a 23-cm telescope by the astronomer James Dunlop in 1826 and was also observed by John Herschel in 1835.
