= N11 (emission nebula) =

Emission nebula in the constellation Dorado

Emission nebula
- superbubble
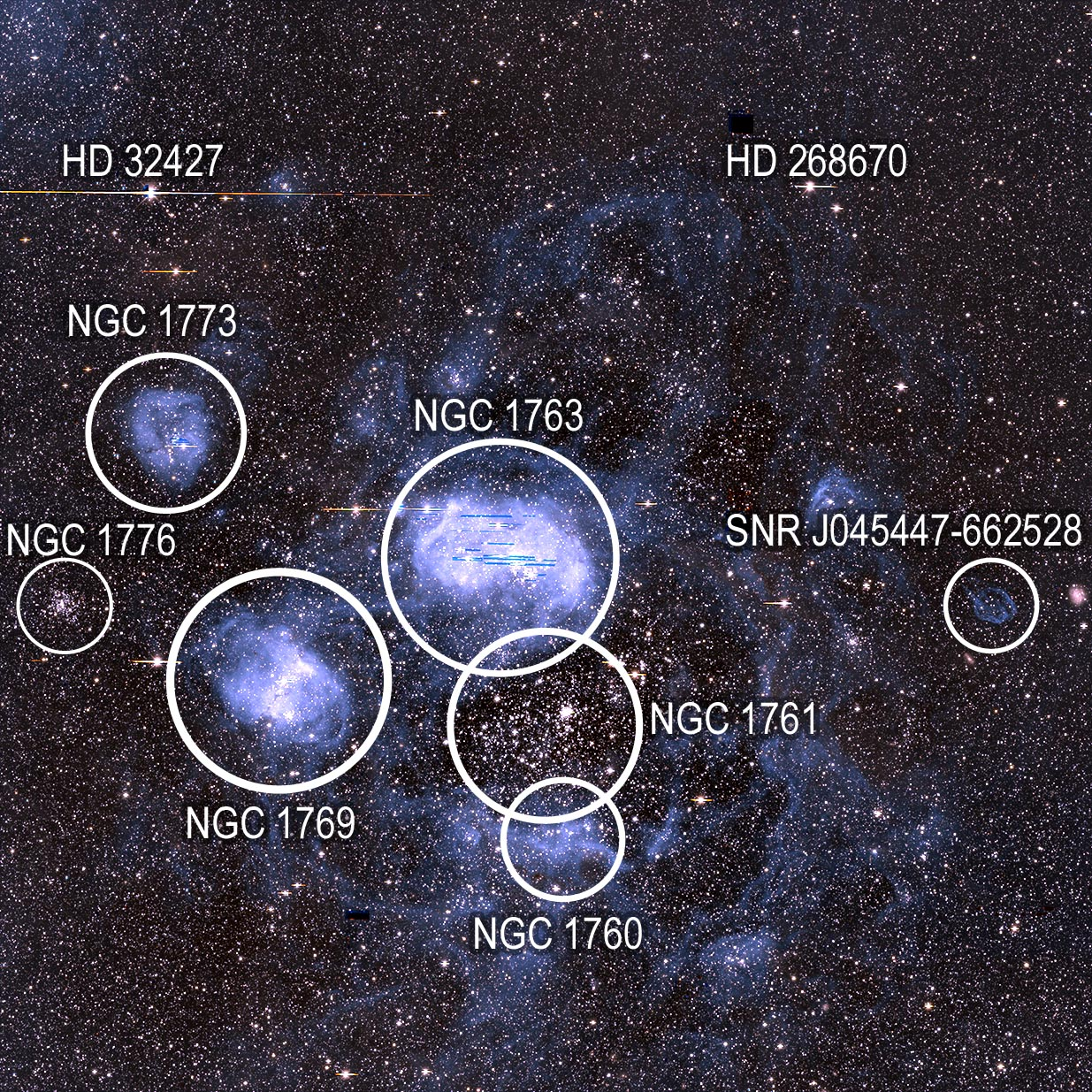
- An annotated image of N11. Image is from the legacy surveys

Observation data: J2000.0 epoch
- Right ascension: 04^{h} 56^{m} 46.2^{s}
- Declination: −66° 28′ 27″
- Distance: 160,000 ly
- Constellation: Dorado

Physical characteristics
- Radius: 500 ly
- Designations: LMC N11, LHA 120-N 11, Bean Nebula

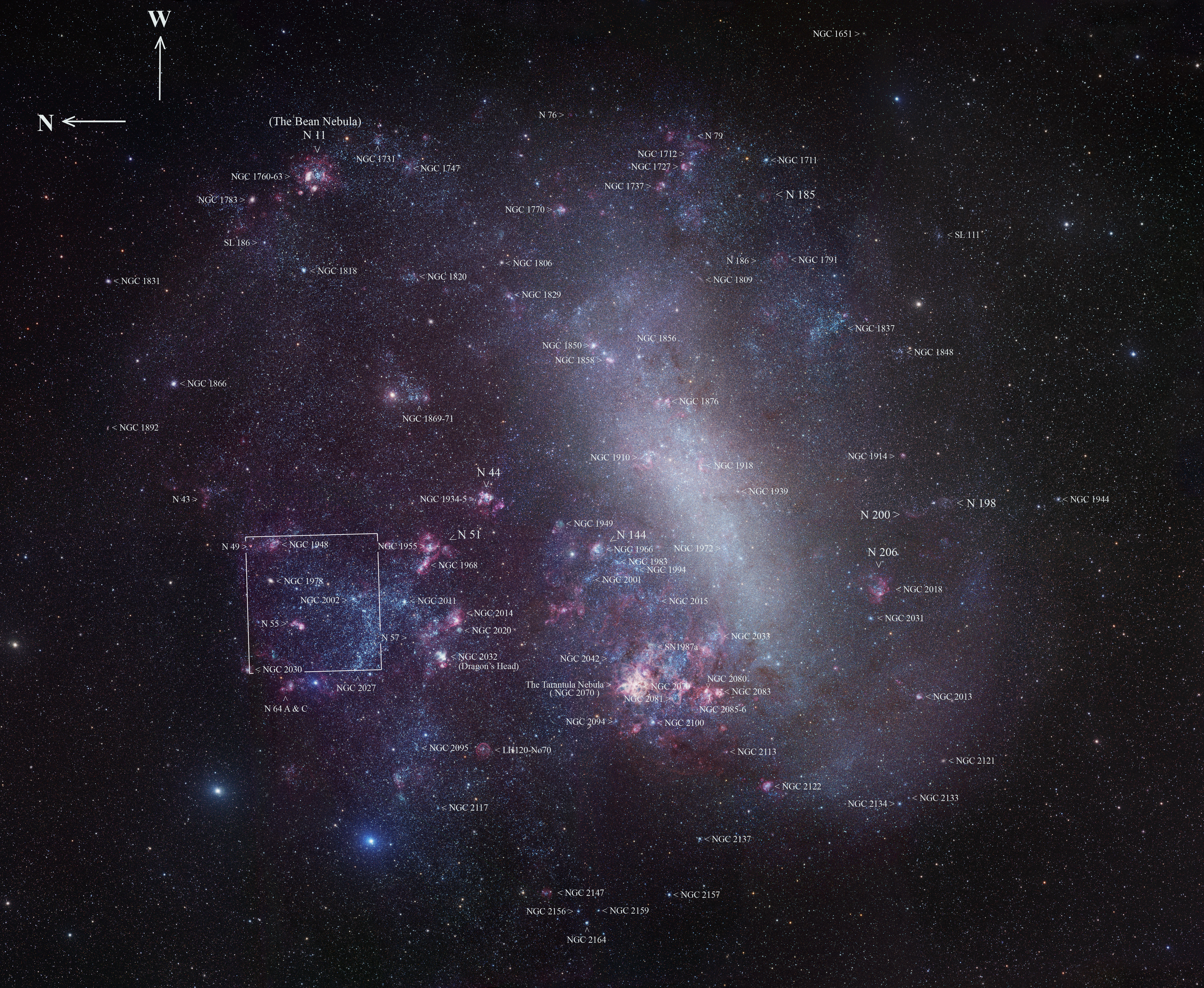
Large Magellanic Cloud with N11 at top left (forming the northwest corner)

N11 (also known as LMC N11, LHA 120-N 11) is the brightest emission nebula in the north-west part of the Large Magellanic Cloud in the constellation Dorado. The N11 complex is the second largest H II region of that galaxy, the largest being the Tarantula Nebula. It covers an area approximately 6 arc minutes across. It has an elliptical shape and consists of a large bubble, generally clear interstellar area, surrounded by nine large nebulae. It was named by Karl Henize in 1956.

When close-up, the nebula has pink clouds of glowing gas which resembles candy floss. It has been well studied over the years and extends 1,000 light-years across.

Its particularly notable features include a huge cavity measuring 80 by 60 pc and a five million year old central cluster (NGC 1761). It is surrounded by several ionized clouds where young O stars are forming. Several massive stars are within it, including LH 9, LH 10, LH 13, LH 14. It includes a supernova remnant N11L. In the very centre of NGC 1761 is a bright multiple star HD 32228 which contains a rare blue Wolf-Rayet star, type WC5 or WC6, and an O-type bright giant.

== Bean Nebula ==
The brightest nebulosity within N11 is the northern region N11B (NGC 1763), also known as the Bean Nebula because of its shape.

== Other most notable nebulae ==
On N11B's north-east edge is the more compact N11A, known as the Rose Nebula, which has rose-like petals of gas and dust and are illuminated due to the massive hot stars within its centre. It is also known as IC 2116 and was catalogued as a star HD 32340.

The east side of the N11 complex is N11C (NGC 1769), an emission nebula containing at least two compact open clusters.

Outside the main "bubble" of N11 to the northeast is N11E, also known as NGC 1773, a small bright nebula containing several massive young stars. The south portion of the bubble is N11F, also called NGC 1760. The western portion of the bubble is faint and poorly defined.

To the south-west of N11 is the 7th magnitude red giant HD 31754, a foreground star/star system, lying close to our sightline with open cluster NGC 1733. Three farther galaxies visible from most southern deep space telescopes and observatories are west of N11: the pair PGC 16243 and PGC 16244; and LEDA 89996. To the south of them lie NGC 1731 and TYC 8889-619-1 which are part of the galaxy's N4 complex. The bright globular cluster NGC 1783 figures to the north of N11.

== Gallery ==
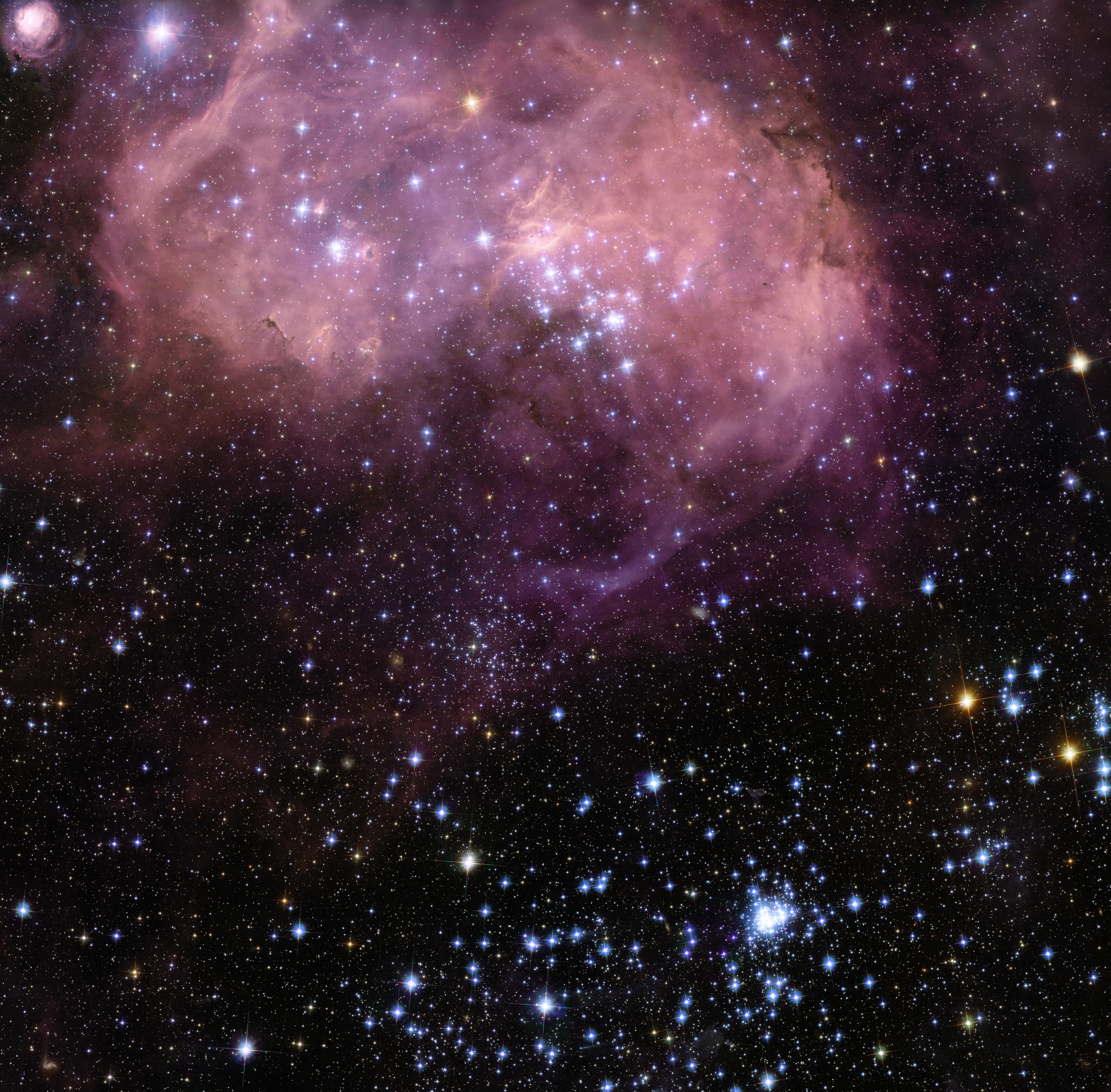
Hubble image of NGC 1763 (nebula at the top) and NGC 1761 (star cluster at the bottom)

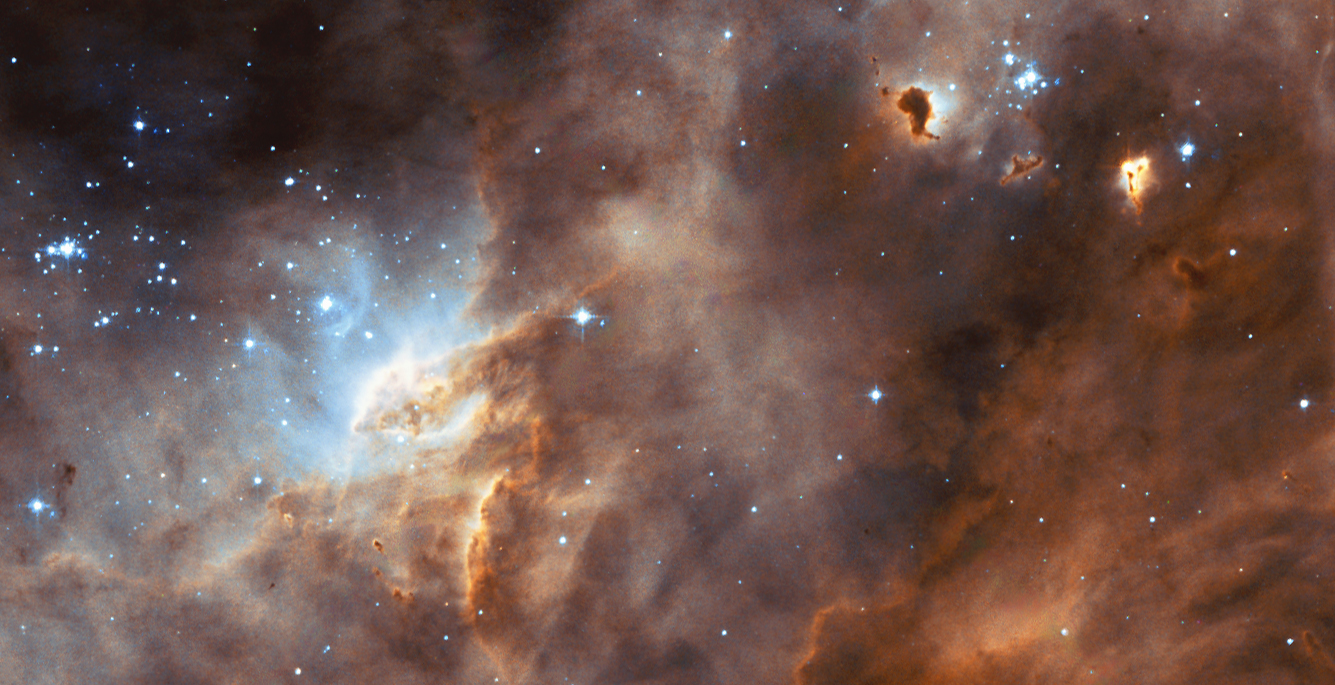
Hubble image of a part of NGC 1763

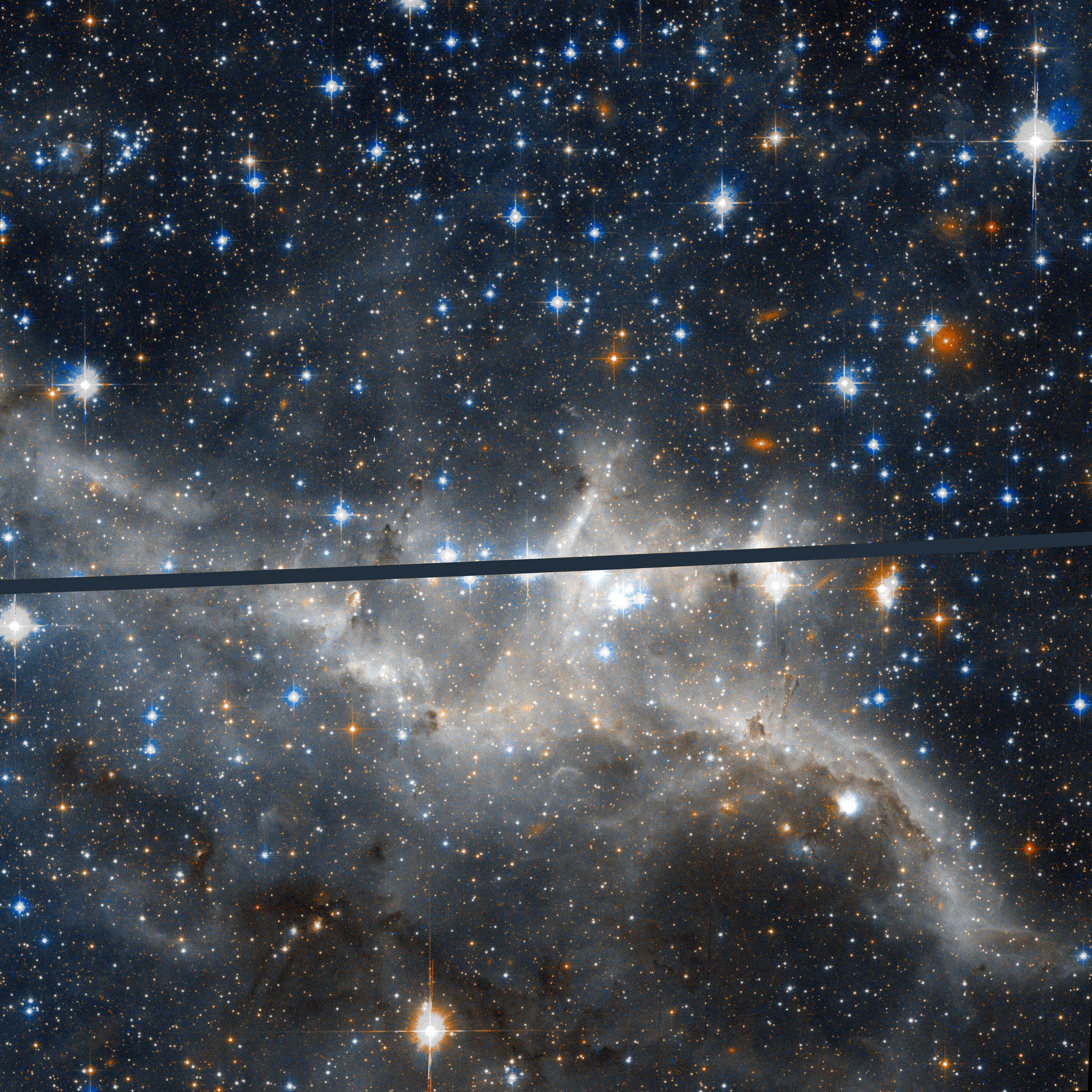
Hubble image of NGC 1760

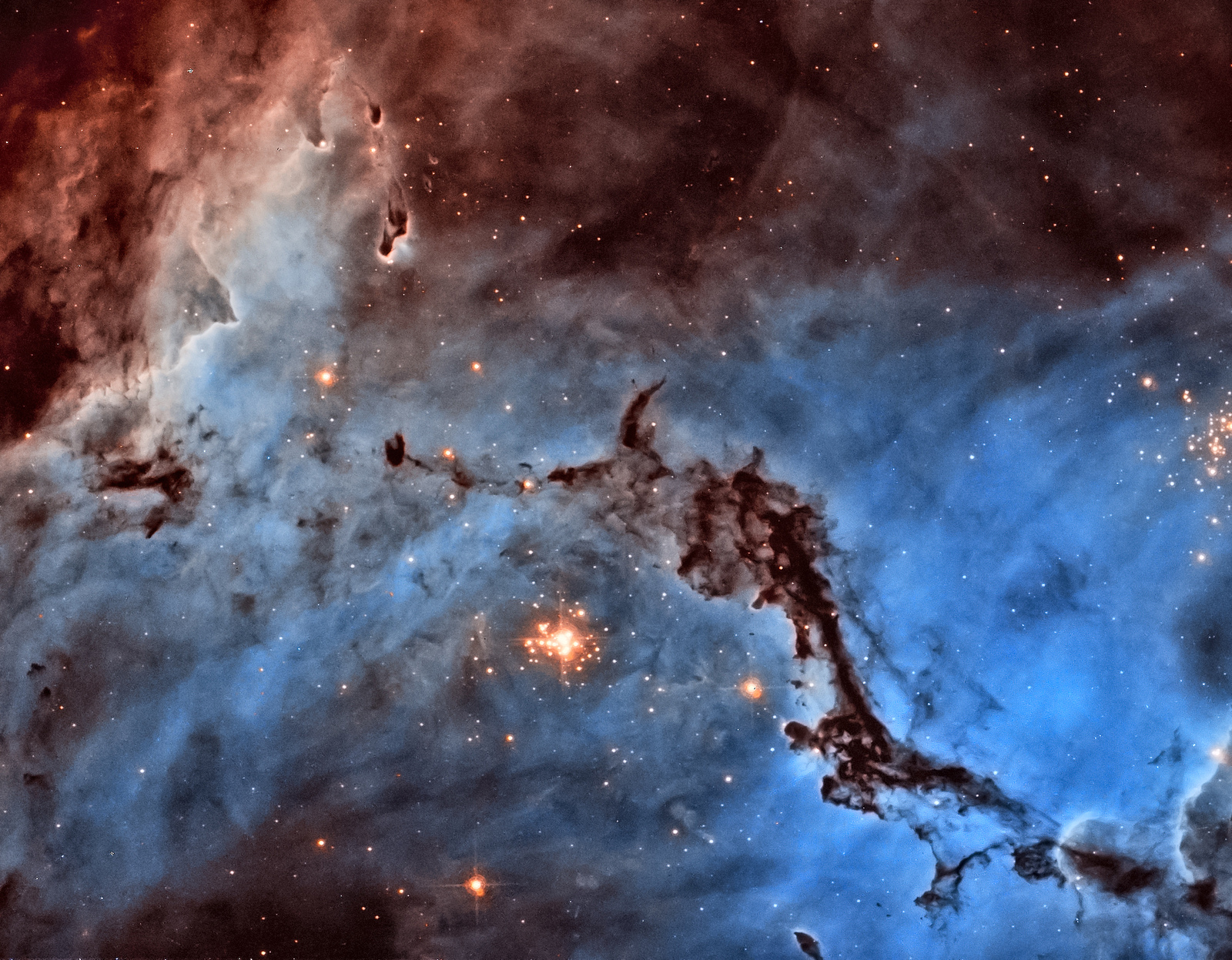
Hubble image showing part of NGC 1769

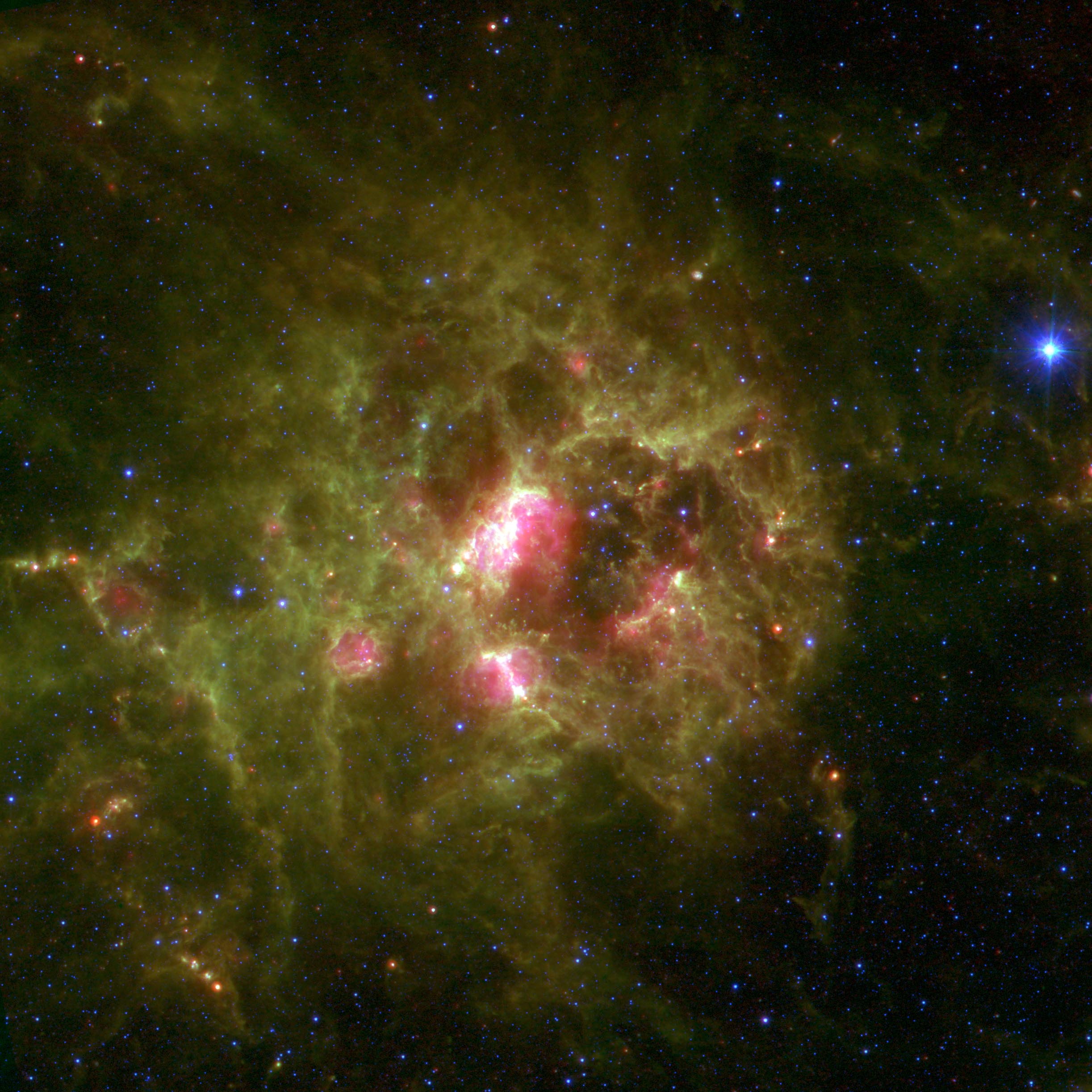
N11 with the Spitzer Space Telescope in mid-infrared
