= NGC 1873 =

Open cluster in the constellation Dorado

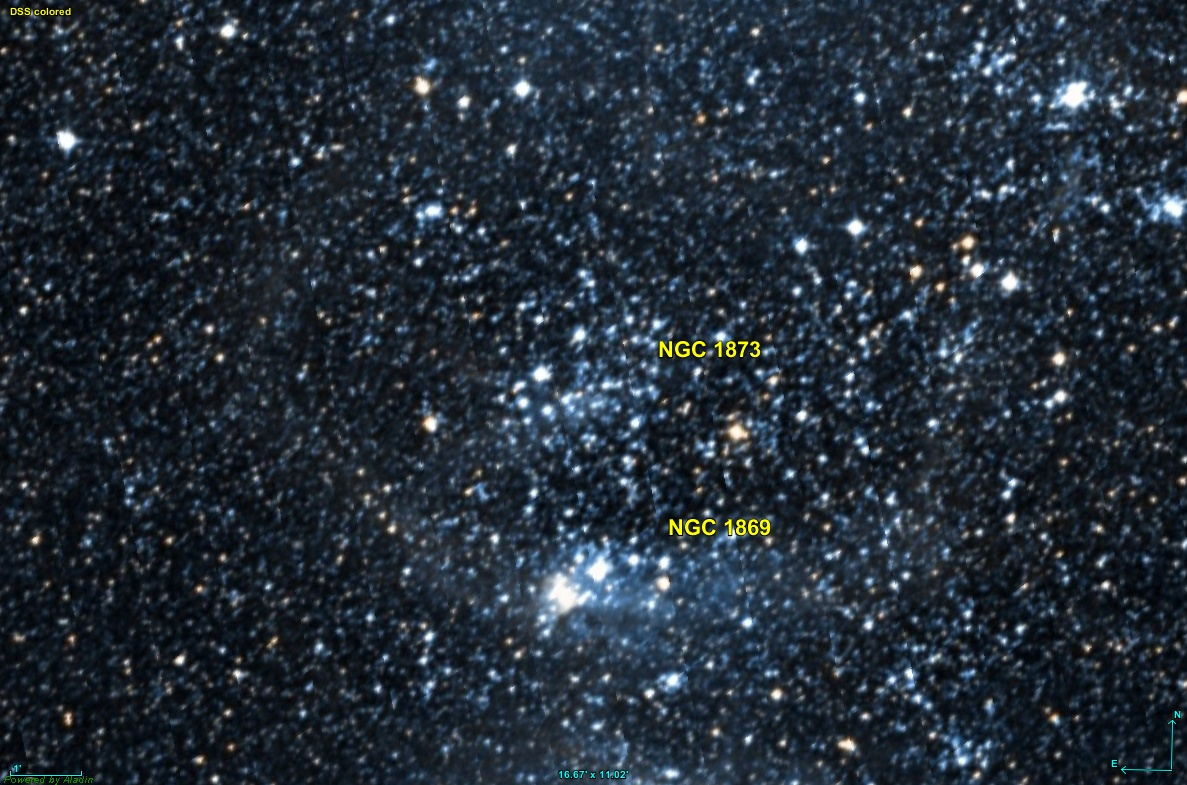
- NGC 1873, just right of centre, with NGC 1869 below it

Observation data (J2000 epoch)
- Right ascension: 05^{h} 13^{m} 55.7^{s}
- Declination: −67° 20′ 04″
- Apparent magnitude (V): 10.4

Physical characteristics
- Other designations: ESO 85-SC54

Associations
- Constellation: Dorado

NGC 1873 (also known as ESO 85-SC54) is an open cluster associated with an emission nebula located in the constellation Dorado within the Large Magellanic Cloud. It was discovered by James Dunlop on September 24, 1826 and rediscovered by John Herschel on January 2, 1837. Its apparent magnitude is 10.4, and its size is 3.50 arc minutes.

NGC 1873 is part of a triple association with NGC 1869 and NGC 1871.
