= NGC 1871 =

Open cluster in the constellation Dorado

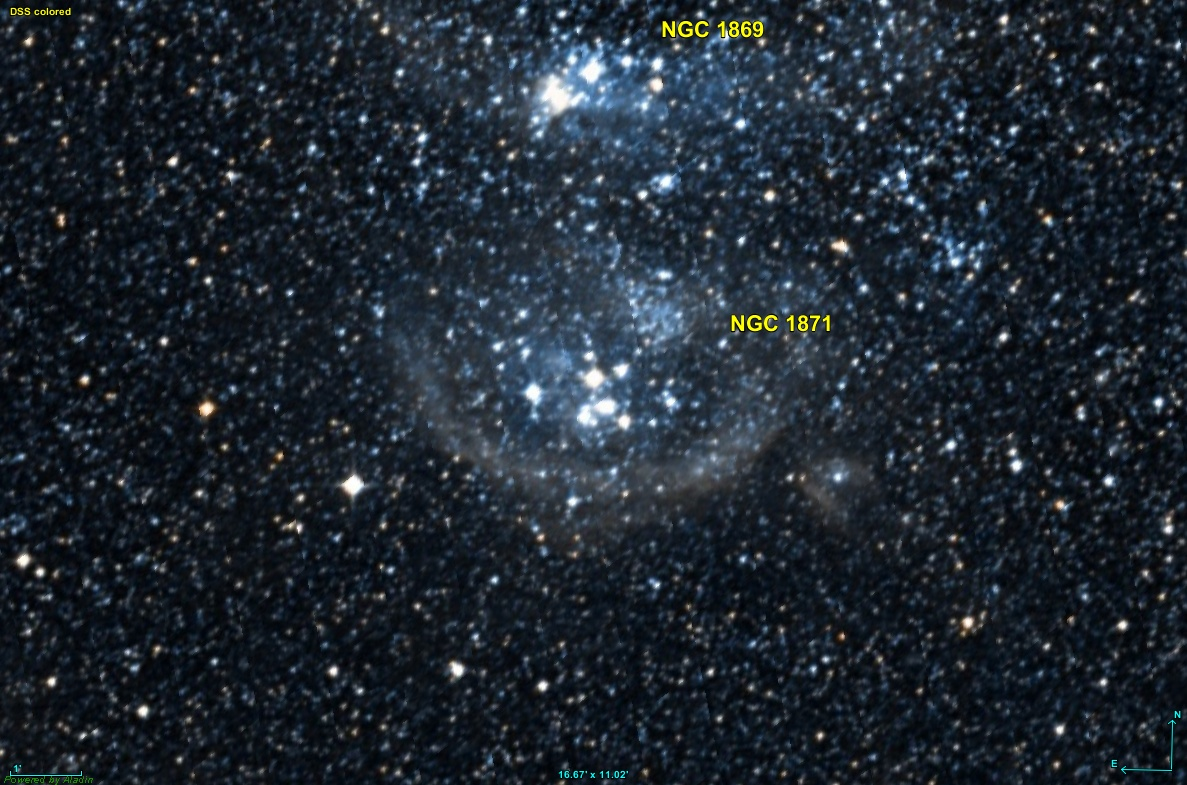
- NGC 1871 with NGC 1869, just above it

Observation data (J2000 epoch)
- Right ascension: 05^{h} 13^{m} 52.36^{s}
- Declination: −67° 27′ 19.88″
- Distance: 160 kly (50 kpc)
- Apparent magnitude (V): 10.09
- Apparent dimensions (V): 2.0’

Physical characteristics
- Other designations: ESO 56-SC85

Associations
- Constellation: Dorado

NGC 1871 (also known as ESO 56-SC85) is an open cluster associated with an emission nebula located in the constellation Dorado within the Large Magellanic Cloud. It was discovered by James Dunlop on November 5, 1826. Its apparent magnitude is 10.09, and its size is 2.0 arc minutes.

NGC 1871 is part of a triple association with NGC 1869 and NGC 1873.

== Environment and classification ==
NGC 1871 is also catalogued as LH 38, [SL63] 325 and [WZ2011] 796. SIMBAD classifies the object as a stellar association. LH 38 forms part of the N30 emission-nebula complex in the Large Magellanic Cloud, together with nearby stellar associations associated with NGC 1869 and NGC 1873.
