= NGC 1869 =

Open cluster in the constellation Dorado

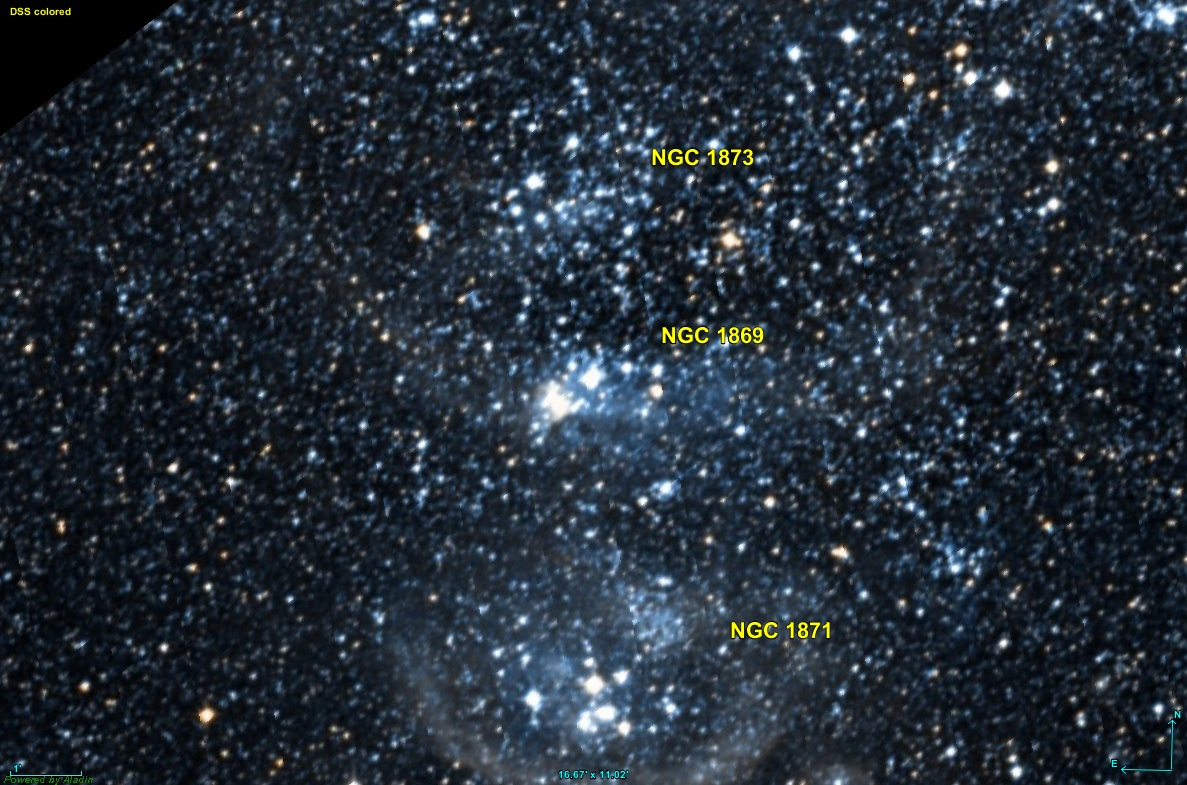
- NGC 1869, just right of centre, with NGC 1871, below right and NGC 1873 above it

Observation data (J2000 epoch)
- Right ascension: 05^{h} 13^{m} 56.3^{s}
- Declination: −67° 22′ 46″
- Apparent magnitude (V): 14.0

Physical characteristics
- Other designations: ESO 85-SC55

Associations
- Constellation: Dorado

NGC 1869 (also known as ESO 85-SC55) is an open cluster in the constellation Dorado. It is located within the Large Magellanic Cloud. It was discovered by James Dunlop on September 24, 1826, using a telescope reflector with a nine-inch aperture. It is a large cluster of rich scattered stars. It is part of a triple association with NGC 1871 and NGC 1873. It has an apparent magnitude of 14.0.
