= NGC 1969 =

Open cluster in the constellation Dorado

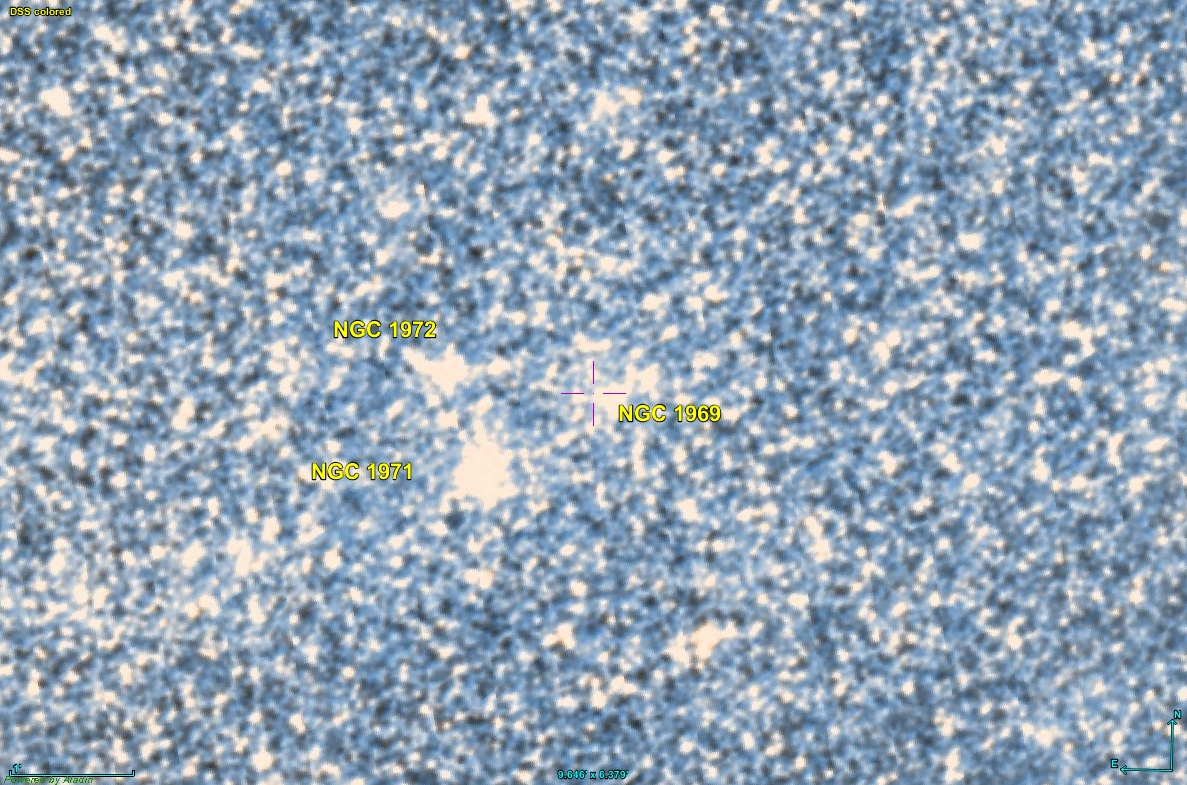
- NGC 1969 in the centre with NGC 1971, slightly south-west and NGC 1972, slightly north-west

Observation data (J2000 epoch)
- Right ascension: 05^{h} 26^{m} 34.11^{s}
- Declination: −69° 50′ 26.7″
- Apparent magnitude (V): 10.28
- Apparent dimensions (V): 0.8′

Physical characteristics
- Other designations: ESO 56-SC124

Associations
- Constellation: Dorado

NGC 1969 (also known as ESO 56-SC124) is an open star cluster in the constellation Dorado and is part of the Large Magellanic Cloud. It was discovered by James Dunlop on September 24, 1826. Its apparent size is 0.8 arc minutes.

== See also ==
- List of NGC objects (1001–2000)
