= NGC 1971 =

Open cluster in the constellation Dorado

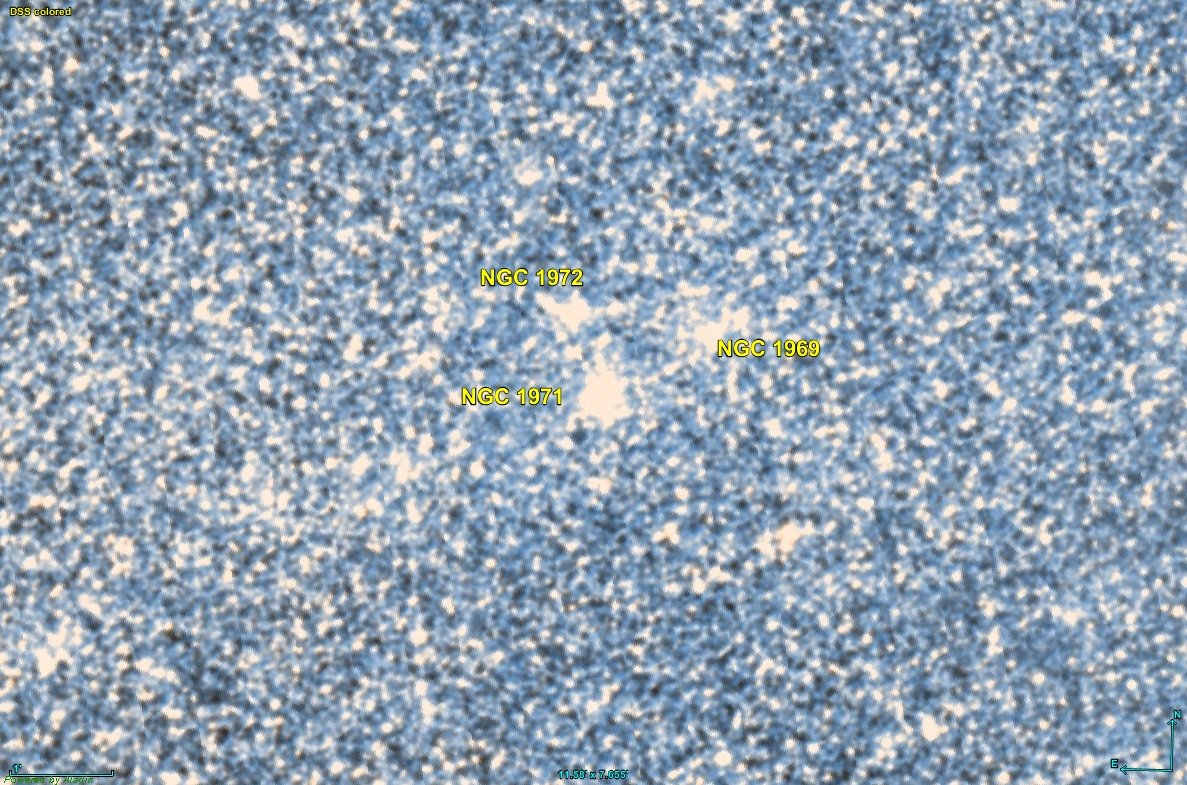
- NGC 1971 in the centre with NGC 1972 just above it and NGC 1969, just right of it.

Observation data (J2000 epoch)
- Right ascension: 05^{h} 26^{m} 45.58^{s}
- Declination: −67° 51′ 03.2″
- Apparent magnitude (V): 11.9
- Apparent dimensions (V): 0.8

Physical characteristics
- Estimated age: 160 Myr
- Other designations: ESO 56-SC128, GC 1176, h 2875

Associations
- Constellation: Dorado

NGC 1971 (also known as ESO 56-SC128) is an open cluster which is in the constellation Dorado and is part of the Large Magellanic Cloud (LMC). It was discovered by English astronomer John Herschel on December 23, 1834. The apparent size of this cluster is 11.9 by 0.80 arcminutes. NGC 1971 may form part of a triple system, along with the open clusters NGC 1972 and NGC 1969. They belong to the LH 59 association in the eastern section of the LMC bar.

This is a young cluster that appears to show an age spread of around 170 million years in its member stars. The actual age of the cluster is 160 million years.
