= NGC 1125 =

Galaxy in the constellation Eridanus

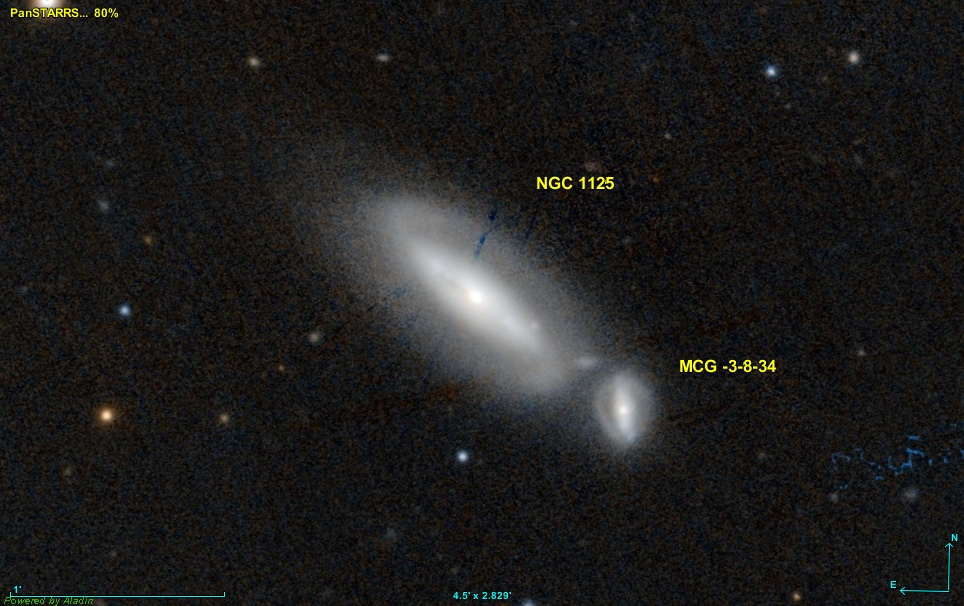
- NGC 1125 imaged by Pan-STARRS

Observation data (J2000 epoch)
- Constellation: Eridanus
- Right ascension: 02^{h} 51^{m} 40.4544^{s}
- Declination: −16° 39′ 02.304″
- Redshift: 0.010931±0.000017
- Heliocentric radial velocity: 3,277±5 km/s
- Distance: 148.5 ± 10.4 Mly (45.53 ± 3.20 Mpc)
- Apparent magnitude (V): 13.43

Characteristics
- Type: (R')SB0/a?(r)
- Size: ~126,000 ly (38.64 kpc) (estimated)
- Apparent size (V): 1.8′ × 0.9′

Other designations
- IRAS 02493-1651, MCG -03-08-035, PGC 10851

NGC 1125 is a barred spiral galaxy in the constellation of Eridanus. Its velocity with respect to the cosmic microwave background is 3,087±14 km/s, which corresponds to a Hubble distance of 148.5 ± 10.4 Mly (45.53 ± 3.20 Mpc). It was discovered by German-British astronomer William Herschel on 6 October 1785.

NGC 1125 is a Seyfert II galaxy, i.e. it has a quasar-like nucleus with very high surface brightnesses whose spectra reveal strong, high-ionisation emission lines, but unlike quasars, the host galaxy is clearly detectable. The strongest emission from ionized and molecular gas is seen about 300 parsecs away from the galaxy’s center.

NGC 1125 appears close to neighboring galaxy MCG -03-08-034, but the alignment is optical, as the neighbor is about 3 times farther away (437.9 ± 30.7 Mly).

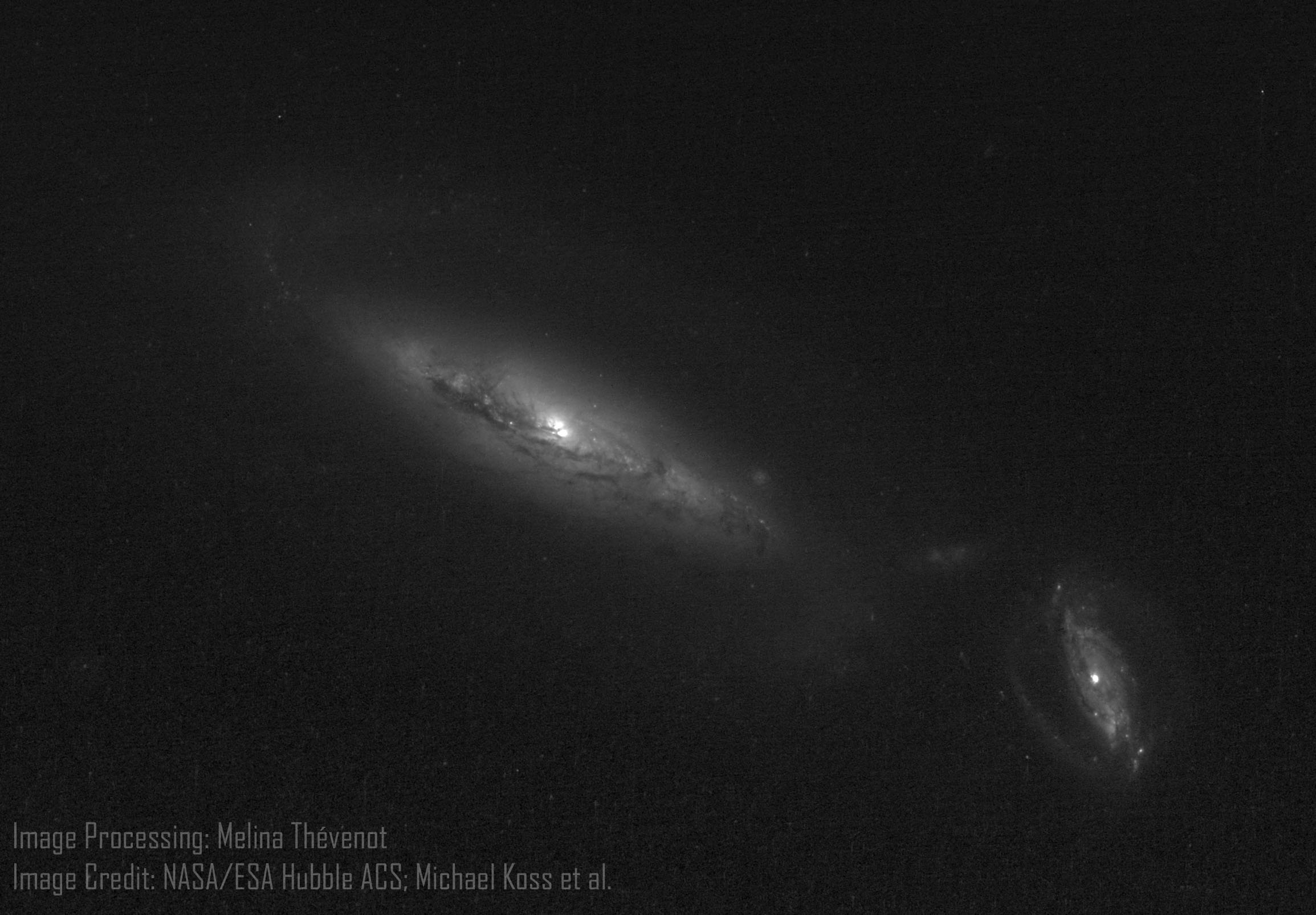
Hubble image of NGC 1125

== See also ==
- List of NGC objects (1001–2000)
