= NGC 1996 =

Star cluster in the constellation of Taurus

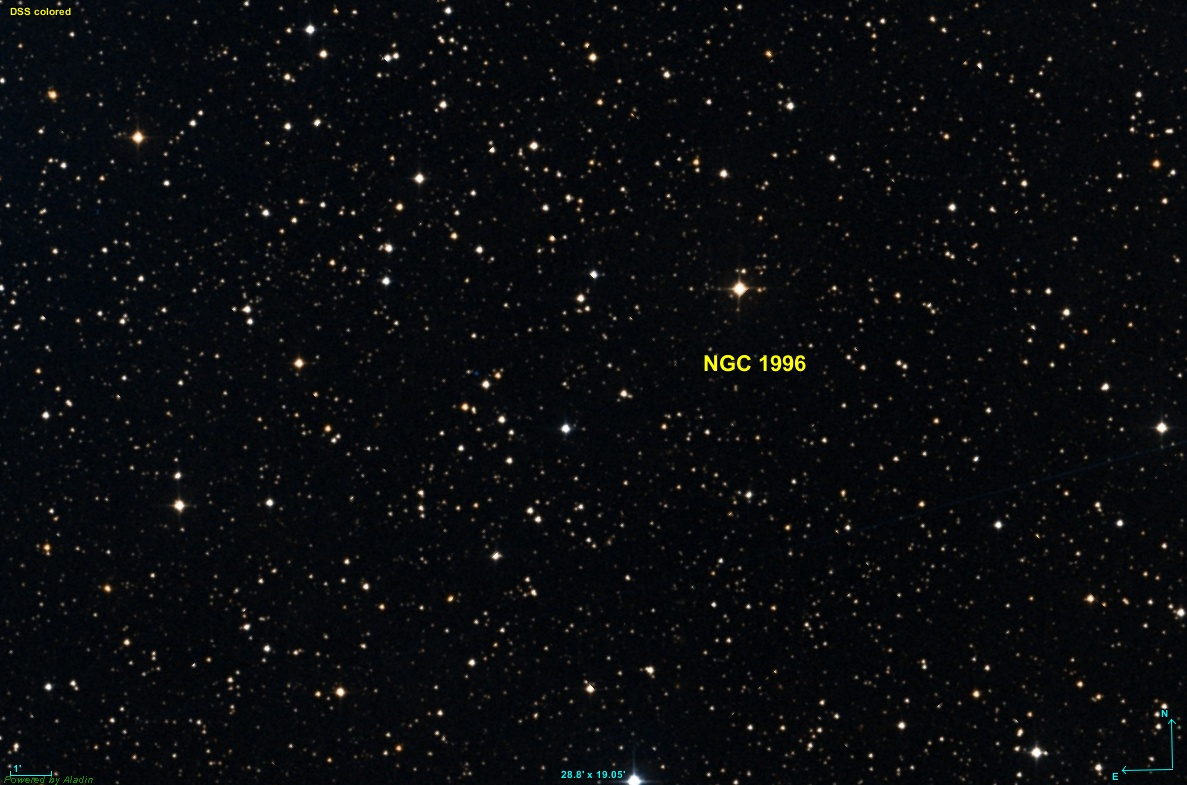
- The open cluster NGC 1996

Observation data (J2000 epoch)
- Right ascension: 05^{h} 38^{m} 10.2^{s}
- Declination: +35° 49′ 04″
- Distance: 4570 (1400 pc)
- Apparent magnitude (V): 988.27

Physical characteristics
- Estimated age: 282 Million
- Other designations: GC 1199, H 8.42

Associations
- Constellation: Taurus

NGC 1996 is an open cluster or a group of stars located in the constellation Taurus. It was discovered by William Herschel on December 7, 1785. NGC 1996 is located around 1400 pc (~ 4570 ly) from the Solar System and it is roughly 282 million years old and its apparent size is 22 arcmin.
