= NGC 1924 =

Barred spiral in the constellation Orion

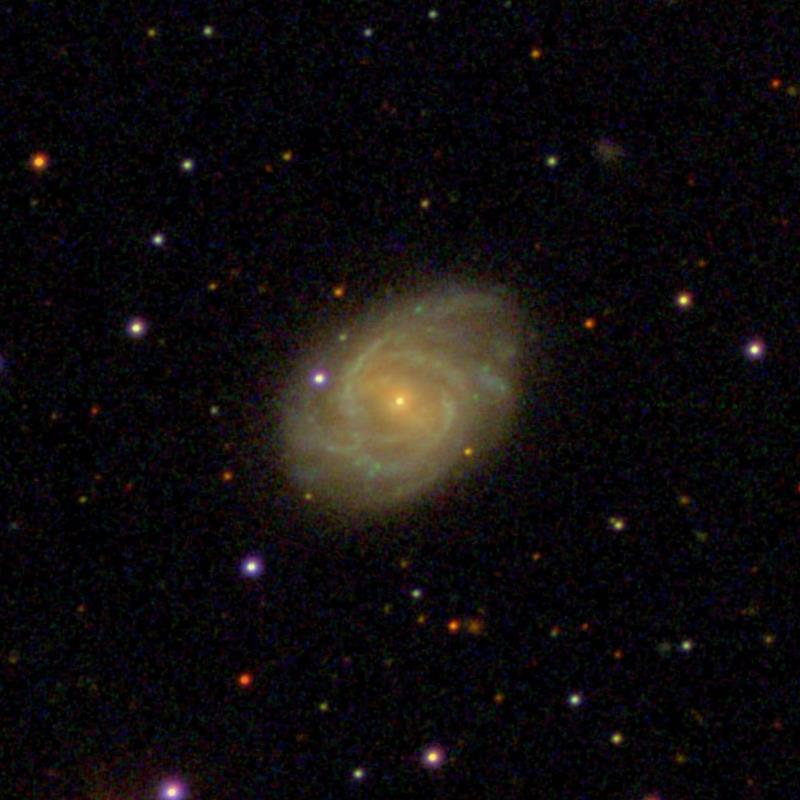
- SDSS image of NGC 1924

Observation data (J2000 epoch)
- Constellation: Orion
- Right ascension: 05^{h} 28^{m} 01.9^{s}
- Declination: −05° 18′ 39″
- Redshift: 0.008533
- Heliocentric radial velocity: 2,558 km/s
- Distance: 143 million ly (43.85 Mpc)
- Apparent magnitude (V): 13.24

Characteristics
- Type: SBbc
- Apparent size (V): 1.6' x 1.2'

Other designations
- PGC 17319, AGC 450061, 6dFGS gJ052802.0-051838, IRAS F05255-0521, LEDA 17319, 2MASX J05280197-0518383, MCG-01-14-011, NPM1G -05.0244, NVSS J052801-051844

NGC 1924 is a barred spiral galaxy located around 143 million light-years away in the constellation Orion. NGC 1924 was discovered on October 5, 1785 by William Herschel. NGC 1924 is not known to have an Active galactic nucleus, and is not known to have much star-forming regions.
