= NGC 1172 =

Elliptical galaxy in the constellation Eridanus

- Hubble image of NGC 1172

Observation data (J2000 epoch)
- Constellation: Eridanus
- Right ascension: 03^{h} 01^{m} 36.06150^{s}
- Declination: −14° 50′ 11.4965″
- Redshift: 0.00548
- Heliocentric radial velocity: 1638 km/s
- Distance: 69.08 ± 0.46 Mly (21.18 ± 0.14 Mpc)
- Apparent magnitude (V): 11.75
- Apparent magnitude (B): 12.76

Characteristics
- Type: E

Other designations
- MCG -03-08-059, PGC 11420

NGC 1172 is an elliptical galaxy in the constellation Eridanus. It was discovered by William Herschel on December 30, 1785.
