= Alister Graham =

Australian astronomer known for work on galaxy structure and supermassive black holes

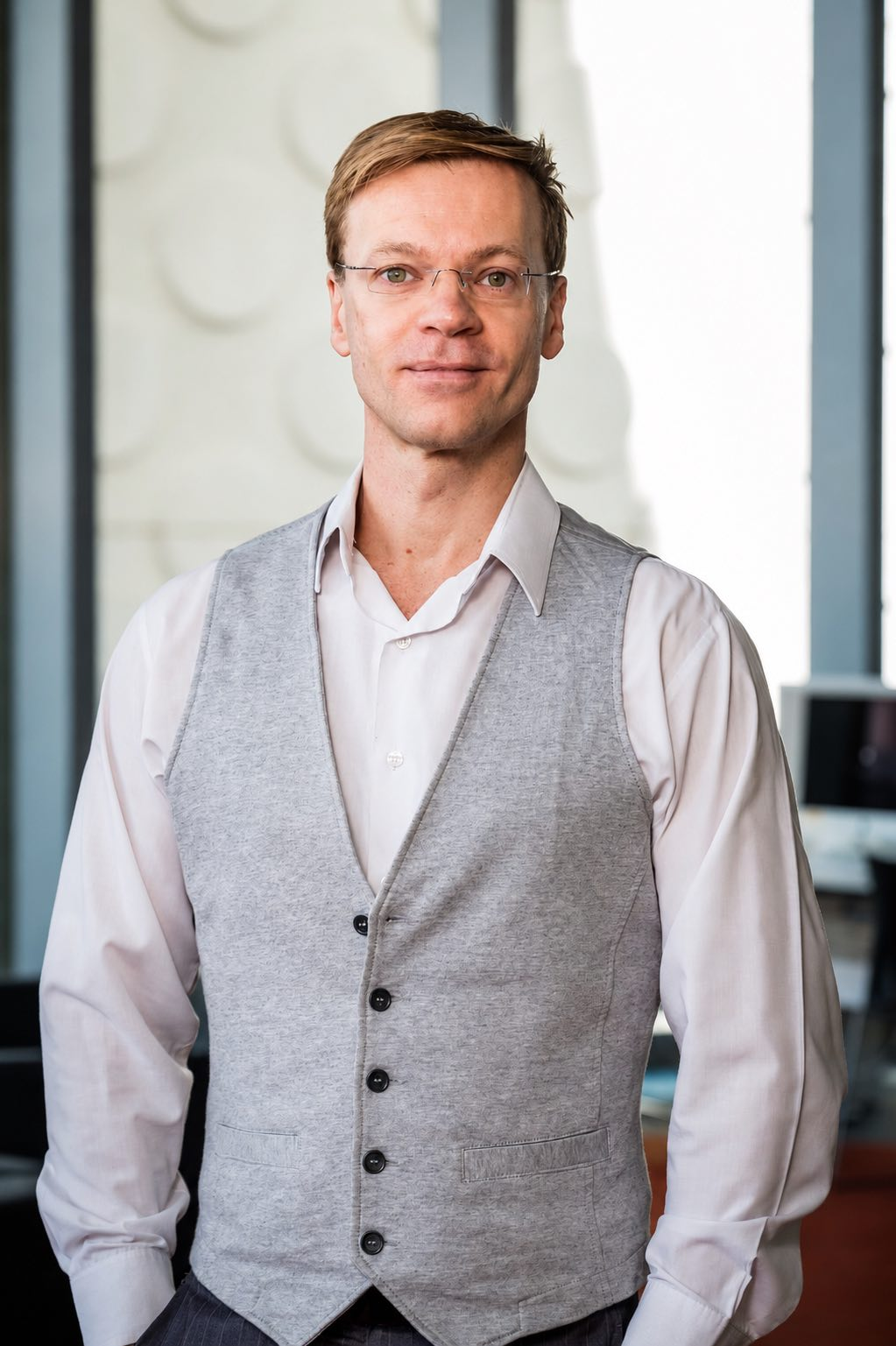
- Alister Graham
- Born: Melbourne, Australia
- Education: Monash University (BSc); Australian National University (PhD)
- Known for: Core–Sérsic model supermassive-black-hole scaling relations Galaxy morphology and evolution
- Awards: Australian Research Council Future Fellowship; Swinburne Vice-Chancellor's Research Excellence Award
- Scientific career
- Fields: Extragalactic astronomy
- Workplaces: Swinburne University of Technology; Australian National University; University of Florida; Instituto de Astrofísica de Canarias
- Doctoral advisor: Matthew Colless; Jeremy Mould

Alister William Graham is an Australian and New Zealand astronomer and Professor at the Centre for Astrophysics and Supercomputing, Swinburne University of Technology. His research concerns the structure and evolution of galaxies, particularly galactic nuclei, supermassive-black-hole scaling relations, and galaxy morphology. He is known for co-developing the core–Sérsic model used in studies of galaxy cores, work on black hole–galaxy scaling relations, studies of galaxy morphology and classification, and science communication in astronomy.

== Early life and education ==
Graham was born in Melbourne, Australia. He completed a Bachelor of Science with First Class Honours in mathematics at Monash University, where he was awarded Faculty Scholar status in the Faculty of Science. He then pursued graduate studies in astronomy at The Australian National University (ANU) as a Duffield Scholar, conducting research at Mount Stromlo and Siding Spring Observatories under the supervision of Matthew Colless and Jeremy Mould. He was awarded his PhD in 1998.

== Career ==
Following his doctoral studies, Graham held postdoctoral research positions at the Instituto de Astrofísica de Canarias and the University of Florida, and a Research Fellow position at The Australian National University, before joining Swinburne University of Technology in 2006 as a Senior Lecturer.

In 2007 he received the Swinburne Vice-Chancellor's Research Excellence Award. He subsequently held an Australian Research Council Future Fellowship from 2011 to 2014, supporting his research on supermassive black holes. Graham has served as Course Director of Swinburne Astronomy Online.

== Research contributions ==
Graham's research focuses on the structure and evolution of galaxies, with particular emphasis on galaxy light-profile modelling and scaling relations involving structure, supermassive black holes, and the connection between galactic nuclei and host galaxy properties. His observational work has relied on data from astronomical facilities, including the Hubble Space Telescope, Spitzer Space Telescope, and Keck Telescopes. As of 2026, Graham's publications have accumulated over 18,000 citations with an h-index of 76, including 23 first-authored papers each exceeding 100 citations. He ranks highly among the top 2% of researchers worldwide in astronomy, as identified by a standardised bibliometric analysis of citation indicators.

He co-developed the core–Sérsic model, a modification of the Sérsic profile used to describe the surface brightness profiles of massive early-type galaxies that exhibit partially depleted cores. This model measures central stellar mass deficits, which are interpreted in the literature as being consistent with dynamical scouring by coalescing supermassive black holes during galaxy mergers. Application has led to one order of magnitude lower core mass deficits compared with earlier modelling frameworks.

His work has contributed to empirical scaling relations linking supermassive black holes with properties of their host galaxies. This includes identifying a correlation between black hole mass and galaxy concentration, contributing to studies of the coexistence of supermassive black holes and nuclear star clusters in galactic nuclei, and establishing a quantitative scaling relation between their masses. Together with collaborators, he has also established scaling relations between nuclear star cluster mass and host galaxy spheroid mass. These results relate to broader studies of black hole–galaxy coevolution and complement established black hole mass–bulge mass relations. Subsequent work examined how these latter relations depend on galaxy morphology.

Graham has authored invited reviews on galaxy structure, bulges, and supermassive black holes, including contributions to the Springer series Astrophysics and Space Science Library and Planets, Stars and Stellar Systems. His work has been discussed in graduate-level textbooks and review articles, including those in the Annual Review of Astronomy and Astrophysics.

Graham has also worked on galaxy morphology and structural classification. He proposed the Triangal framework as a way to describe galaxy evolutionary pathways not represented in the traditional Tuning Fork diagram. The framework incorporates three physically distinct origins for lenticular galaxies—primeval systems, faded spiral galaxies, and dust-rich merger remnants—and traces evolutionary pathways through major gas-rich and gas-poor mergers from the lenticular galaxies through ellicular (ES) galaxies to elliptical galaxies and brightest cluster galaxies, with spiral galaxies emerging as a bridging population between dust-poor and dust-rich lenticular galaxies via gas accretion and minor mergers. His work also includes interpretations of ultra-compact dwarf galaxies (UCDs) as possible remnant nuclei of tidally stripped galaxies, and ultra-diffuse galaxies (UDGs) as an extension of brighter early-type galaxy structural scaling relations. He has discussed compact high-redshift red nuggets in the context of possible structural links to present-day bulge-dominated systems. He has also coined the term "ellicular" to describe ES galaxies with structural properties intermediate between those of elliptical (E) and lenticular (S0) galaxies.

In 2012, Graham reported the discovery of the rare rectangular-shaped dwarf galaxy LEDA 74886. He also led the discovery of "Nikhuli", an indigenous Naga name given to a star cluster in the spiral galaxy NGC 4424, interpreted as the galaxy-stripped nucleus of an infalling dwarf galaxy. The observation was regarded as evidence supporting scenarios in which spiral galaxies may acquire massive black holes through the accretion of infalling systems.

Graham co-discovered supernovae SN 1998do, SN 1998dp, SN 1998du, SN 1998dv and SN 1998dw with the 50-inch MACHO Telescope at Mount Stromlo Observatory.

== Science communication and media coverage ==
Graham has written articles ranging from black holes to space weather and the distinction between astronomy and astrology for popular science publications, including BBC Sky at Night, Astronomy Now, and The Conversation.

In 2025, Graham delivered a lecture and question-and-answer session for hundreds of secondary school students in Kohima, Nagaland, India, discussing black holes and the discovery of "Nikhuli". The visit and associated outreach activities were covered by regional media outlets, including India Today NE, The Morung Express, and local television broadcasters.

His discovery of the rectangular-shaped galaxy LEDA 074886, nicknamed the "emerald-cut galaxy", received international media attention, including coverage in New Scientist, Australian Geographic, National Geographic, Universe Today, and El País.

== Textbooks ==
Graham's research is mentioned in standard astrophysics textbooks, including Galaxy Formation and Evolution by Houjun Mo, Frank van den Bosch, and Simon White, Dynamics and Evolution of Galactic Nuclei by David Merritt, A Panchromatic View of Galaxies by Alessandro Boselli, Extragalactic Astronomy and Cosmology : An Introduction by Peter Schneider. and Introduction to Galaxy Formation and Evolution: From Primordial Gas to Present-Day Galaxies by Andrea Cimatti, Filippo Fraternali, and Carlo Nipoti.
