= I band =

I band may refer to:

- the obsolete I band radio frequency allocation
- an infrared filter in the UBVRI photometric system
