= NGC 1421 =

Galaxy in the constellation Eridanus

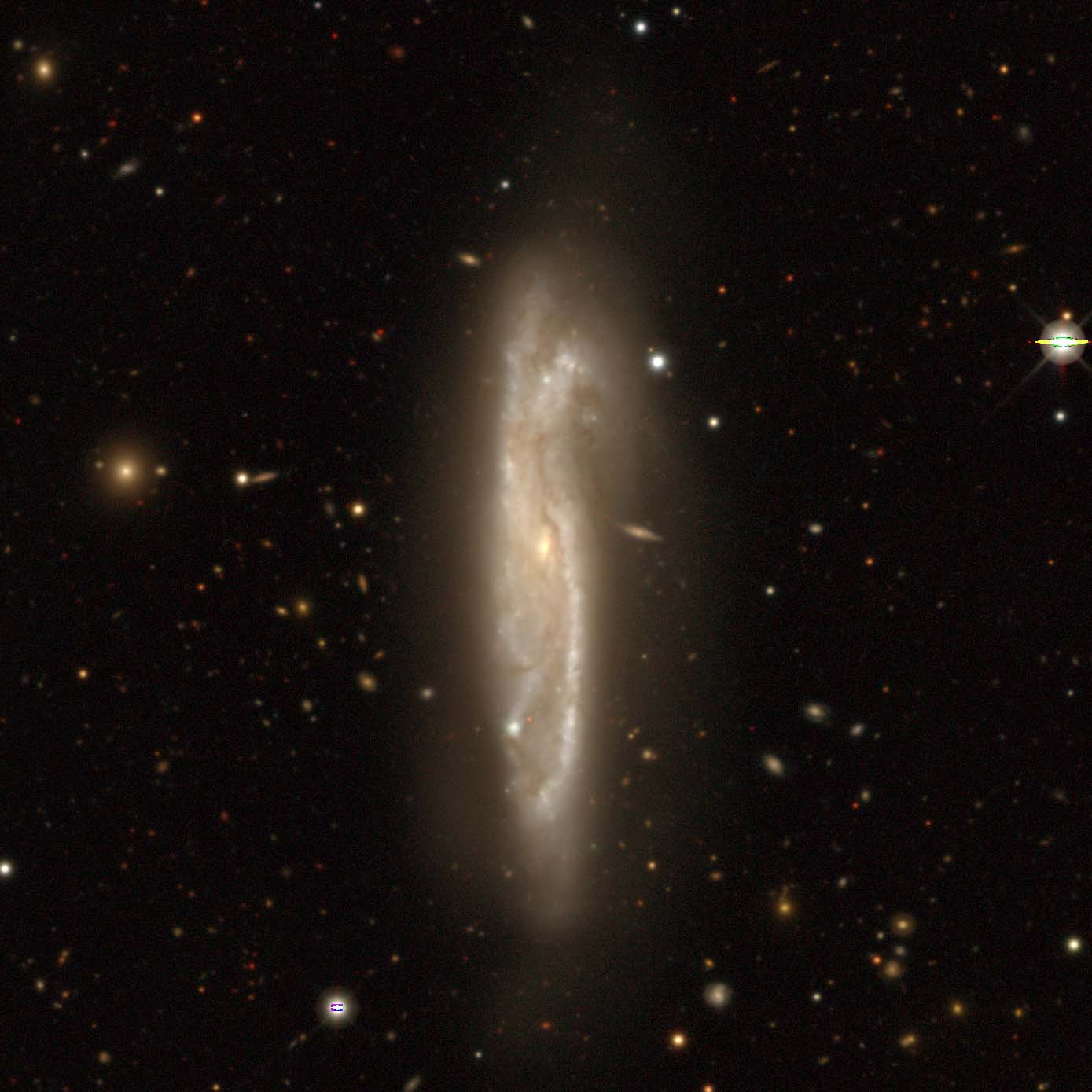
- NGC 1421 by Legacy Surveys DR10

Observation data (J2000 epoch)
- Constellation: Eridanus
- Right ascension: 03^{h} 42^{m} 29.3^{s}
- Declination: −13° 29′ 17″
- Redshift: 0.006971 ± 0.000017
- Heliocentric radial velocity: 2,090 ± 5 km/s
- Distance: 69.1 ± 17 Mly (21.2 ± 5.2 Mpc)
- Group or cluster: Eridanus Group
- Apparent magnitude (V): 11.4

Characteristics
- Type: SAB(rs)bc
- Apparent size (V): 3.5′ × 0.9′

Other designations
- MCG -02-10-008, IRAS 03401-1338, PGC 13620

NGC 1421 is a spiral galaxy in the constellation Eridanus. The galaxy lies about 70 million light years away from Earth, which means, given its apparent dimensions, that NGC 1421 is approximately 70,000 light years across. It was discovered by William Herschel on February 1, 1785. It is a member of the Eridanus Group.

== Characteristics ==
The galaxy is seen nearly edge-on. It has a bright nucleus with a diffuse bar and two asymmetric high surface brightness spiral arms. The southern arm emerges from the bar, bends slightly to the south and after that it appears straight up to the edge of the galaxy. After that it bends eastwards and fades. The southern arms have several star forming regions. One or two armlets are visible east of the southern arm. The northern arm emerges east of the bar, bends westwards and breaks in two branches. The western branch has higher surface brightness, bright knots, and ends at an elongated bright knot. The eastern branch is smooth.

The observed asymmetry appears to be the result of an interaction or a merger. Radio imaging of the CO line shows an additional kinetic component, which has a relative speed of 300 km/s with respect to the rest of the galaxy. This feature corresponds to a disturbance in the central and north part of the galaxy in H-alpha imaging. The multiple star forming regions in the arms of the galaxy are also indicative of an interaction.

The nucleus appears to be active, categorised as an HII region based on its optical spectrum, and has radio emission which spans for several hundred parsecs. The galaxy has X-ray emission which extends beyond the visual disk of the galaxy, mostly towards the south.

== Nearby galaxies ==
NGC 1421 is the foremost galaxy of the NGC 1421 group, which also includes MCG -02-10-009. The group belong to the Eridanus Group, which also includes the Fornax Cluster and the Eridanus Cluster. The galaxy has a dwarf companion galaxy which has two bright nuclear HII regions.
