= Otto Struve Telescope =

Telescope

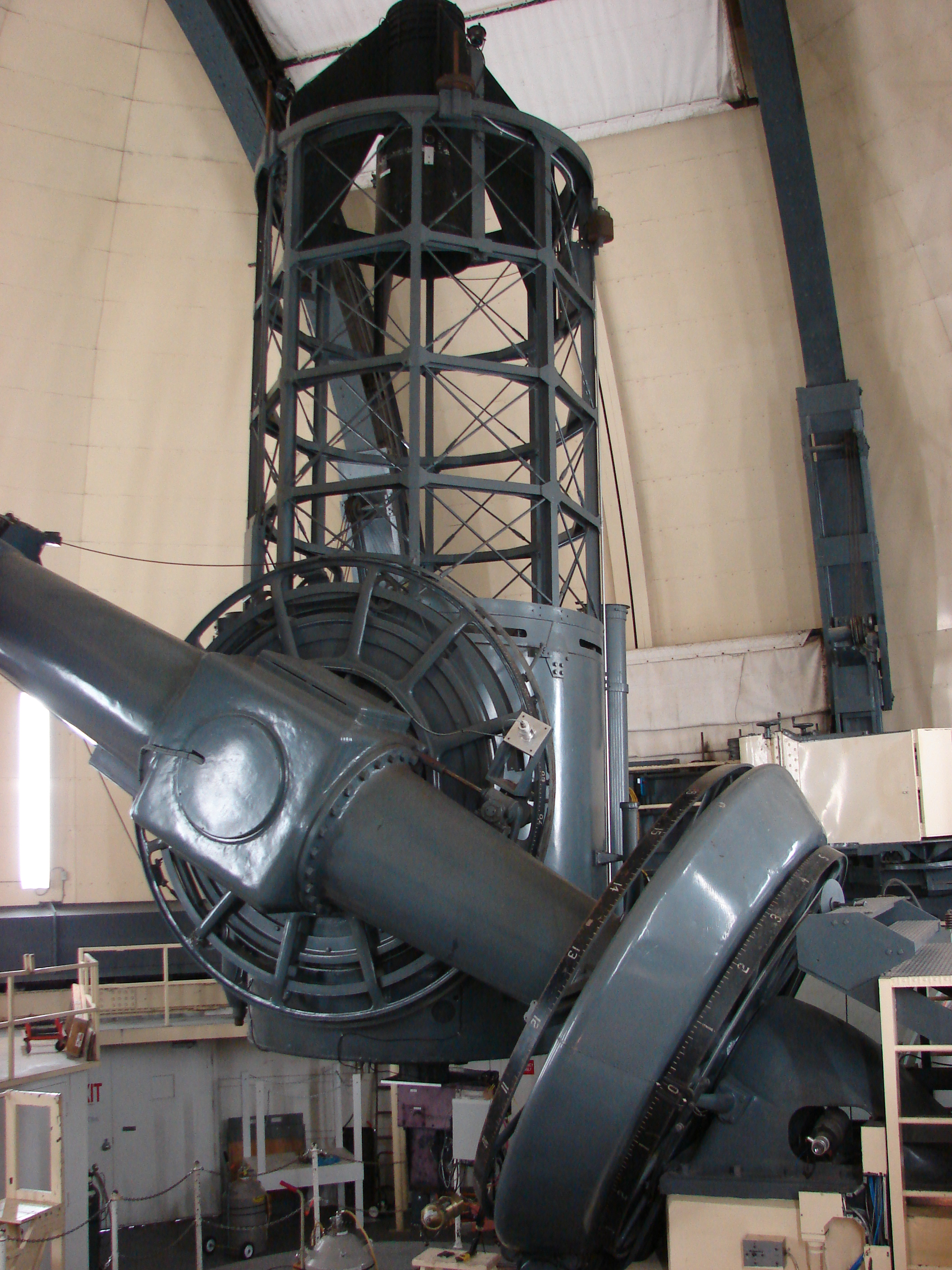
- The Otto Struve Telescope
- Alternative names: 2.1m-Otto Struve Telescope
- Location(s): Jeff Davis County, Texas
- Coordinates: 30°40′47″N 104°01′29″W
- Discovered: Nereid
- Diameter: 82 in (2.1 m)
- Website: mcdonaldobservatory.org/research/telescopes/Struve
- Location of Otto Struve Telescope
- Related media on Commons

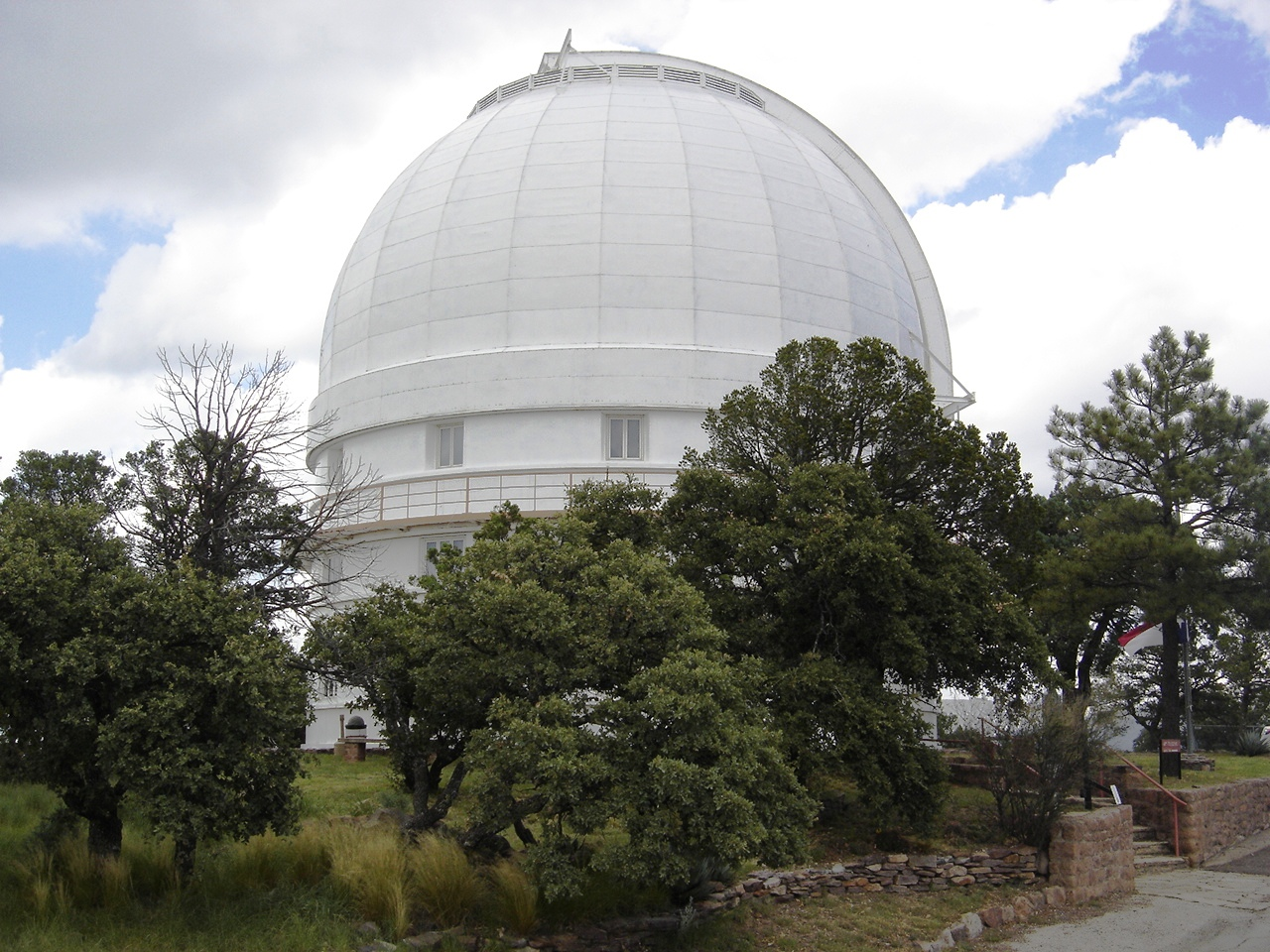
The telescope's dome

The Otto Struve Telescope was the first major telescope to be built at McDonald Observatory. Located in the Davis Mountains in West Texas, the Otto Struve Telescope was designed by Warner & Swasey Company and constructed between 1933 and 1939 by the Paterson-Leitch Company. Its 82-inch (2.1 m) mirror was the second largest in the world at the time. (Note: It was second only to the Mt. Wilson 100-inch (2.5 m) telescope.) It was named after the Ukrainian-American astronomer of Baltic German origin Otto Struve in 1966, three years after his death; Struve had been the director of McDonald Observatory from 1932–1950.

The Davis Mountains is an excellent location for astronomical research because of the clear dry air and moderately high elevation. The remote nature of the facility proved to be a significant challenge in transporting such a large mirror. It was a very precarious journey for the Otto Struve Telescope's mirror to this remote part of Texas and up to the top of Mount Locke. The mirror was transported from the local town of Fort Davis up the mountain by Carleton D. Wilson, owner of a local trucking company, while locals cheered as they looked on.

The Otto Struve telescope is still in use today. It is updated with modern imaging detectors allowing astronomers to conduct many types of research.

== Noted applications and Discoveries ==
The telescope was one of two used to set up and define the Johnson-Morgan UBV photometric system.

In 1949, G. Kuiper of Yerkes Observatory discovered a new moon of planet Neptune, named Nereid. The moon was discovered on photographic plates taken in a search for moons of Neptune.

== Contemporaries on commissioning ==
The Otto Struve telescope saw first light in 1939, behind the 100-inch Hooker telescope and ahead of two large British Commonwealth telescopes, both in Canada. Many competing projects were delayed due to the war in the early 1940s.

Four largest telescopes in 1939:

#	Name / observatory	Image	Aperture	Altitude	First light	Special advocate
1	Hooker Telescope; Mount Wilson Obs.		100 inch 254 cm	1742 m (5715 ft)	1917	George Ellery Hale; Andrew Carnegie
2	Otto Struve Telescope; McDonald Obs.		82 inch 208 cm	2070 m (6791 ft)	1939	Otto Struve
3	David Dunlap Observatory		74 inch 188 cm	224 m (735 ft)	1935	Clarence Chant
4	Plaskett telescope Dominion Astrophysical Obs.		72 inch 182 cm	230 m (755 ft)	1918	John S. Plaskett

== See also ==
- List of largest optical telescopes in the 20th century
- List of largest optical reflecting telescopes
- List of the largest optical telescopes in the contiguous United States
