= LEDA 74886 =

Dwarf galaxy in the constellation Eridanus with a rectangular shape

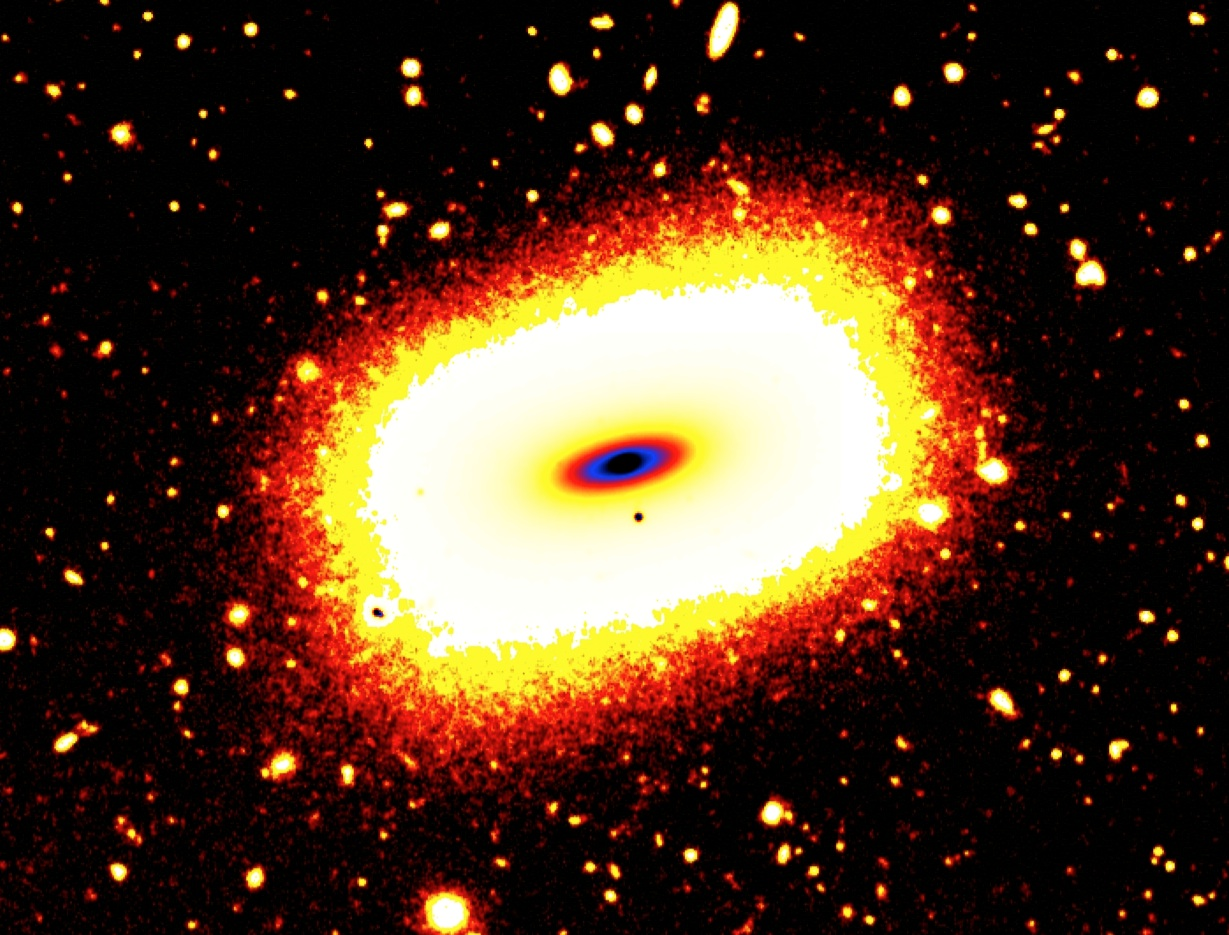
- False color image of galaxy LEDA 74886, taken by the Subaru Telescope. The contrast of this image has been adjusted to highlight the internal disk/bar like structure.

Observation data (J2000 epoch)
- Constellation: Eridanus
- Right ascension: 03^{h} 40^{m} 43.233^{s}
- Declination: −18° 38′ 43.10″
- Distance: 70,000 kly (21,000 kpc) h^{−1}_{0.73}
- Group or cluster: NGC 1407

Characteristics
- Type: S0
- Mass: 1×10^{9} M_{☉}

Other designations
- 2MASX J03404323-1838431, 6dFGS gJ034043.2-183843

LEDA 74886, also known by its 2MASX designation 2MASX J03404323-1838431, and sometimes known as the Emerald-cut Galaxy, is a dwarf galaxy with a rare rectangular shape. It is located at a distance of about 70,000,000 light-years (21 Mpc) in the constellation Eridanus. The galaxy was detected in a wide field of view image taken by the Subaru Telescope using the Subaru Prime Focus Camera (Suprime-Cam). Using the Keck Telescope, a thin disc with a side on orientation was confirmed to be lurking at the center of LEDA 74886, and spinning at a speed of 33 km/s at the orbital radius of half a kpc. LEDA 74886 has a mass of around 10^{9} M_{☉} (Compared to the Milky Way's mass of about 10^{12} M_{☉}).

== Location ==
LEDA 74886 is located in the celestial sphere at a right ascension ($\alpha$) of 03^{h} 40^{m} 43.2^{s}, and a declination ($\delta$) of −18° 38′ 43″ (J2000). It is located within the Galactic corona of NGC 1407, a massive spherical galaxy which is located approximately 163,000 ly (50 kpc) to the northwest of LEDA 74886.

== See also ==
- SDSS J074018.17+282756.3 is a spiral galaxy with arms that have a somewhat squarish-looking interior, but is distinct from LEDA 74886, because LEDA 74886 has no apparent spiral structure and a boxy like exterior form.
- Sextans A, a member of the local group, has a box like form due to its expanding shell of young blue stars, but it has a much lower mass and density, and includes a central disc which LEDA 74886 does not include.
- NGC 4488

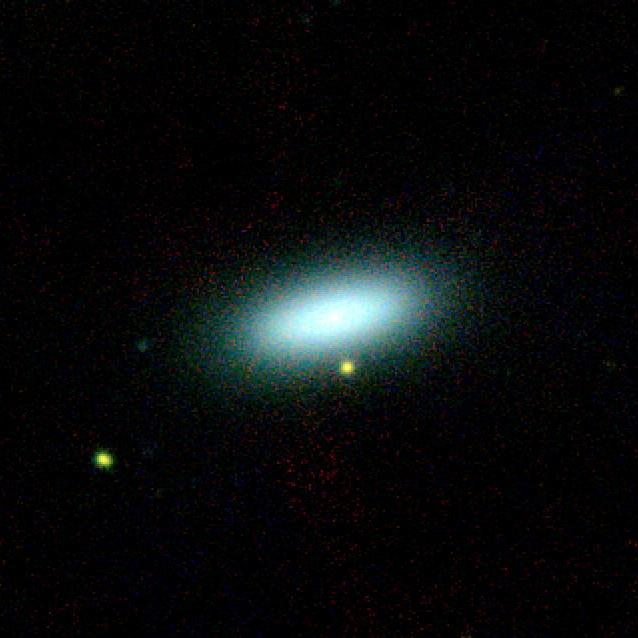
A color cut-out image of LEDA 74886
