= NGC 1400 =

Galaxy in the constellation Eridanus

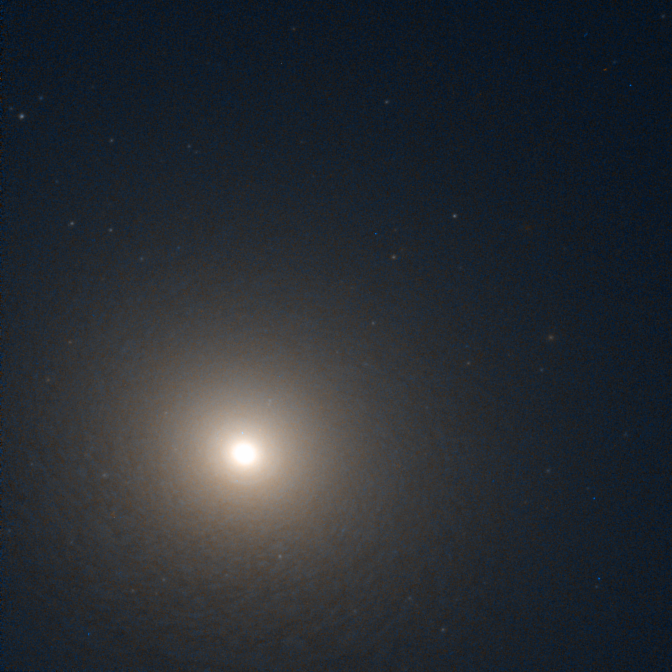
- Hubble Space Telescope image of NGC 1400

Observation data (J2000 epoch)
- Constellation: Eridanus
- Right ascension: 03^{h} 39^{m} 30.851^{s}
- Declination: −18° 41′ 17.25″
- Redshift: 0.001769
- Heliocentric radial velocity: 530 km/s
- Distance: 82 Mly (25 Mpc)
- Apparent magnitude (V): 10.96
- Apparent magnitude (B): 11.92
- Magnitude (J): 8.747
- Magnitude (H): 8.039
- Magnitude (K): 7.811

Characteristics
- Type: SA0^{−}
- Apparent size (V): 2.3′ × 2.0′

Other designations
- MCG -03-10-022, PGC 13470

NGC 1400 is an elliptical galaxy in the constellation Eridanus. 28 non-redshift measurements give a mean distance of 84.45 ± 6.94 Mly (25.893 ± 2.127 Mpc). It was discovered by German-British astronomer William Herschel on 20 September 1786.

NGC 1400 is an early-type E0 galaxy. Despite their name, early-type galaxies are much older than spiral galaxies, and mostly comprise old, red-colored stars. Very little star formation occurs in these galaxies; the lack of star formation in elliptical galaxies appears to start at the center and then slowly propagates outward.

NGC 1400 has had star formation in the past, which was caused by NGC 1400 falling into the NGC 1407 group.

== NGC 1407 Group ==
NGC 1400 is a member of the NGC 1407 group, whose brightest member is NGC 1407. The NGC 1407 Group is part of the Eridanus Cluster, a cluster of 200 galaxies.

NGC 1400 is part of the NGC 1407 Group (known as LGG 100). It has at least 9 members, including NGC 1400, NGC 1407, NGC 1357, NGC 1452.

== Supernova ==
One supernova has been observed in NGC 1400:

- SN 2021hcz (Type Ia, mag. 15.43) was discovered by Gaia Photometric Science Alerts on 24 March 2021.

== Gallery ==
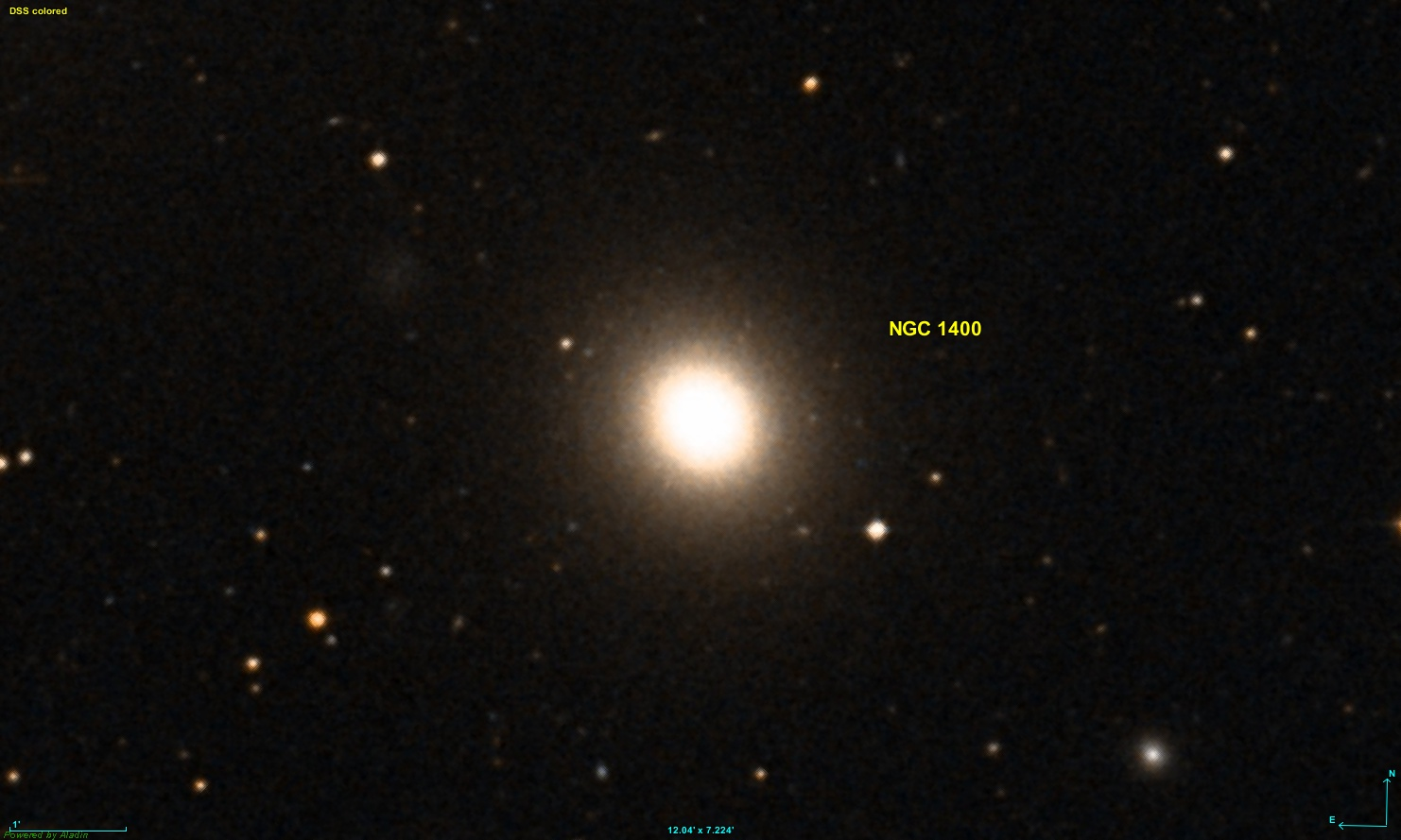
DSS image of NGC 1400

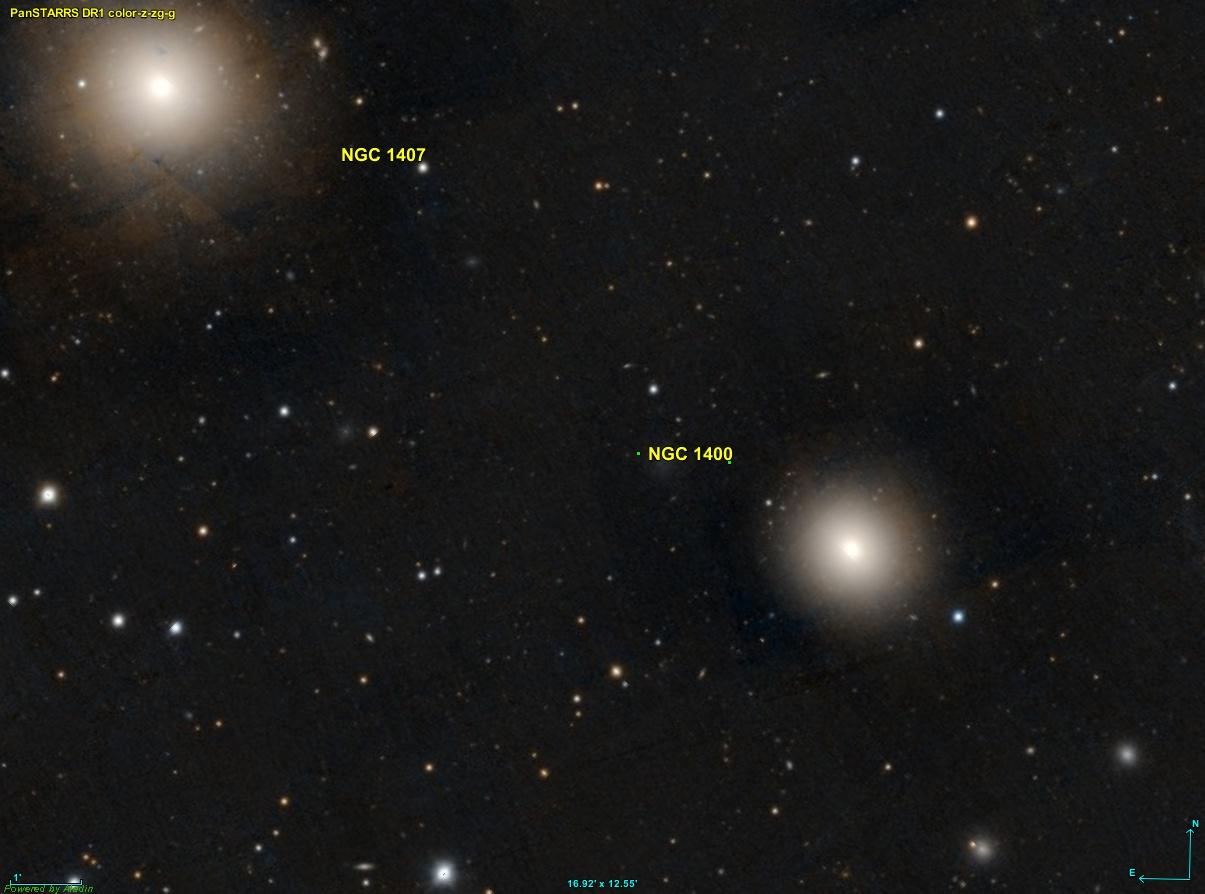
Pan-STARRS image of NGC 1400
