= NGC 4424 =

Spiral galaxy in the constellation Virgo

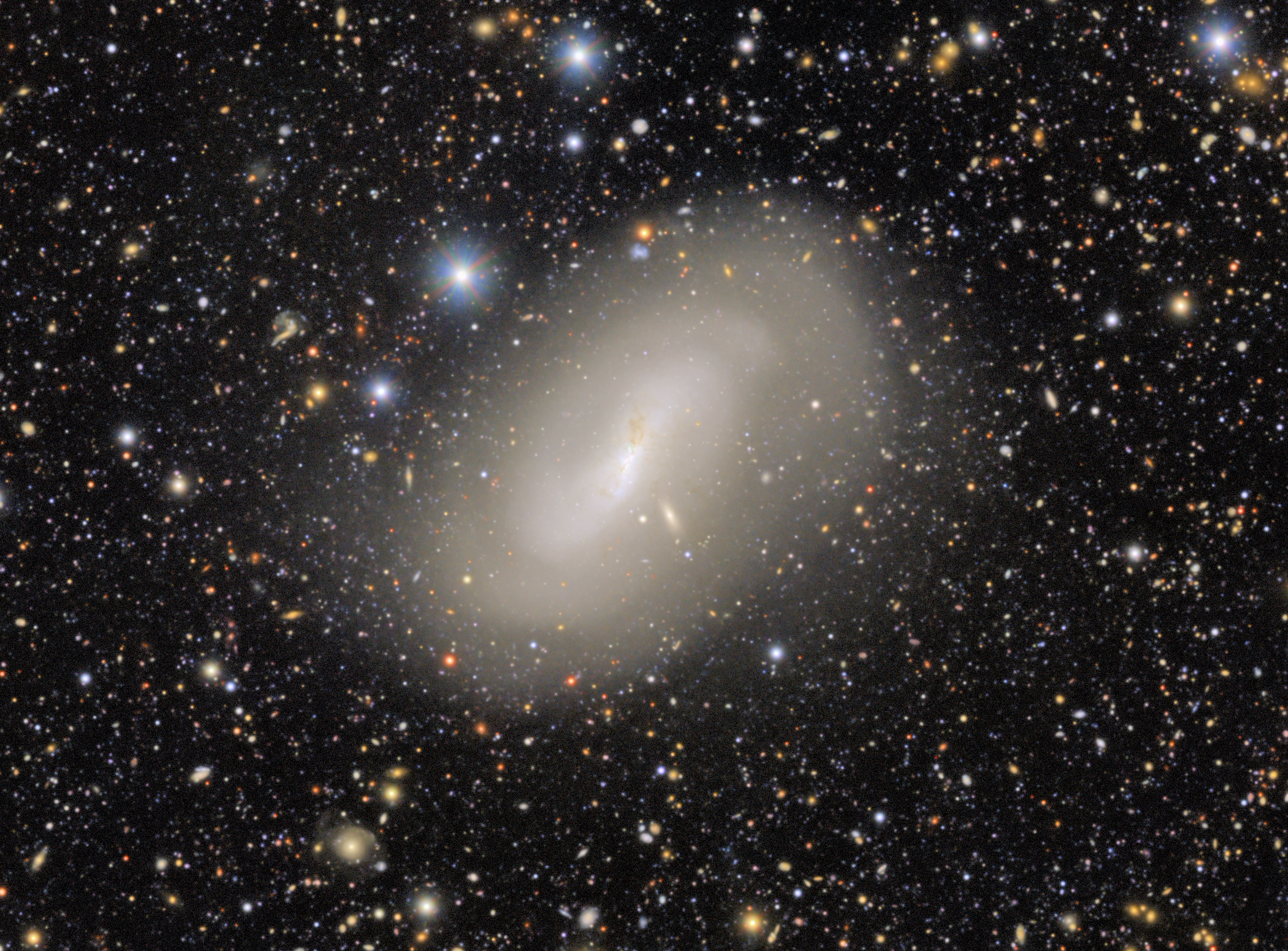
- NGC 4424 imaged by the Vera C. Rubin Observatory

Observation data (J2000 epoch)
- Constellation: Virgo
- Right ascension: 12^{h} 27^{m} 11.575^{s}
- Declination: +09° 25′ 14.32″
- Redshift: 0.00146
- Heliocentric radial velocity: 442
- Distance: 13.5 Mly (4.1 Mpc)
- Group or cluster: Virgo Cluster

Characteristics
- Type: SB(s)a peculiar
- Mass: 3.8+2.3 −1.4×10^{8} M_{☉}

Other designations
- IRAS 12246+0941, 2MASX J12271158+0925138, UGC 7561, MCG +02-32-058, PGC 40809

NGC 4424 is a spiral galaxy located in the equatorial constellation of Virgo. It was discovered February 27, 1865 by German astronomer Heinrich Louis d'Arrest. This galaxy is located at a distance of 13.5 million light years and is receding with a heliocentric radial velocity of 442 km/s. It has a morphological class of SB(s)a, which normally indicates a spiral galaxy with a barred structure (SB), no inner ring feature (s), and tightly-wound spiral arms (a). The galactic plane is inclined at an angle of 62° to the line of sight from the Earth. It is a likely member of the Virgo Cluster of galaxies.

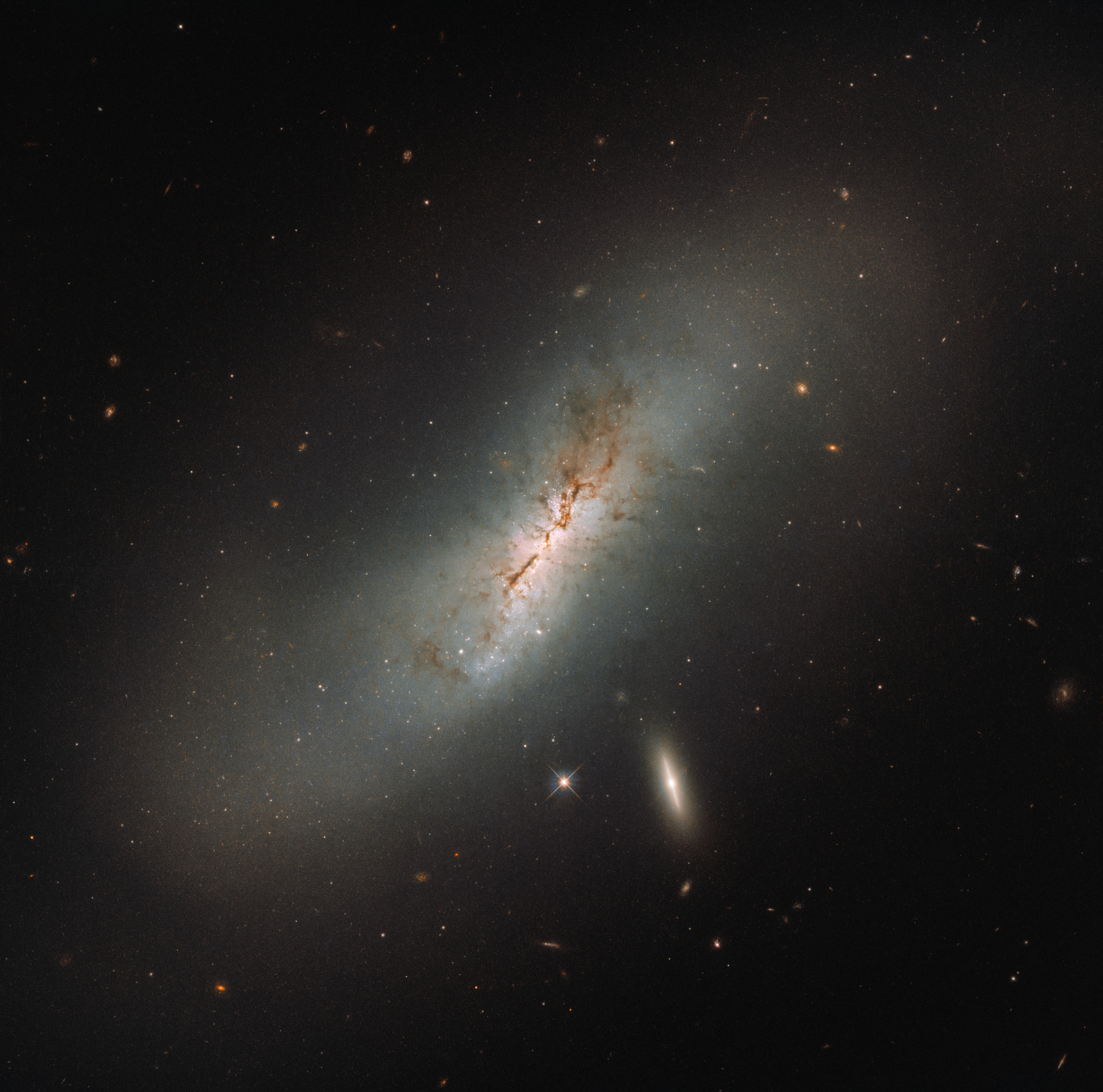
NGC 4424 imaged by the Hubble Space Telescope; the smaller galaxy IC 3366 is below center

The galaxy NGC 4424 has a peculiar morphology with shells that give the appearance of a galaxy merger within the last half billion years. It has a long tail of hydrogen stretching 110 kpc to the south that is likely due to stripping from ram pressure. Because of the lack of gas, star formation has completely ceased in the outer parts of the galaxy, while there is still a mild amount occurring in the inner region. NGC 4424 will most likely end up as a lenticular galaxy by three billion years from now.

There is no indication of an active, compact source of X-ray emission at the very center of NGC 4424, but there is an ionized tail stretching ~10 kpc from the core. Based on its stellar mass and velocity dispersion, the galaxy's center is predicted to host an intermediate-mass black hole (IMBH) of approximately (0.8±0.2)×10^{5} M_{☉}. Hubble images show a red, tidally stretched star cluster—named "Nikhuli"—located at a projected distance of about 5″ (~400 pc) from the nucleus. Nikhuli has a stellar mass of (3.44±0.93)×10^{6} M_{☉} and is elongated toward the galaxy's center, suggesting it may be the captured nuclear star cluster of a stripped galaxy undergoing tidal shredding during a minor merger. Coincident with Nikhuli is an X-ray point source, NGC 4424 X-3, which exhibits a luminosity of L_{0.5–8 keV} ≈ 6×10^{38} erg s^{−1} and is interpreted as an active massive black hole (with an estimated mass of ∼0.7×10^{5} M_{☉}). This cluster is expected to sink to the center of NGC 4424 due to dynamical friction on a timescale of roughly 100 to 220 million years, potentially seeding the bulgeless host with its central black hole. The discovery of Nikhuli and its potential role in black hole seeding attracted widespread coverage in popular science and mainstream media.

== Supernovae ==
Two supernovae have been observed in NGC 4424:

- SN 1895A (type unknown, mag. 12.5) was discovered by Max Wolf on March 16, 1895.
- SN 2012 cg (Type Ia, mag. 16.9) was discovered by the LOSS program from images taken on May 17, 2012. It reached maximum light (mag. 11.9) nine days later and became the brightest supernova of the year 2012. The supernova reached a peak absolute magnitude of −19.50±0.31 in the B (blue) band and synthesized 0.72±0.31 M_{☉} of the radioactive isotope nickel-56. The available observations favor a merger of double degenerate progenitors as the source for the event. The proximity of the galaxy made this one of the best studied supernova explosions to date.
