= NGC 4488 =

Galaxy in the constellation of Virgo

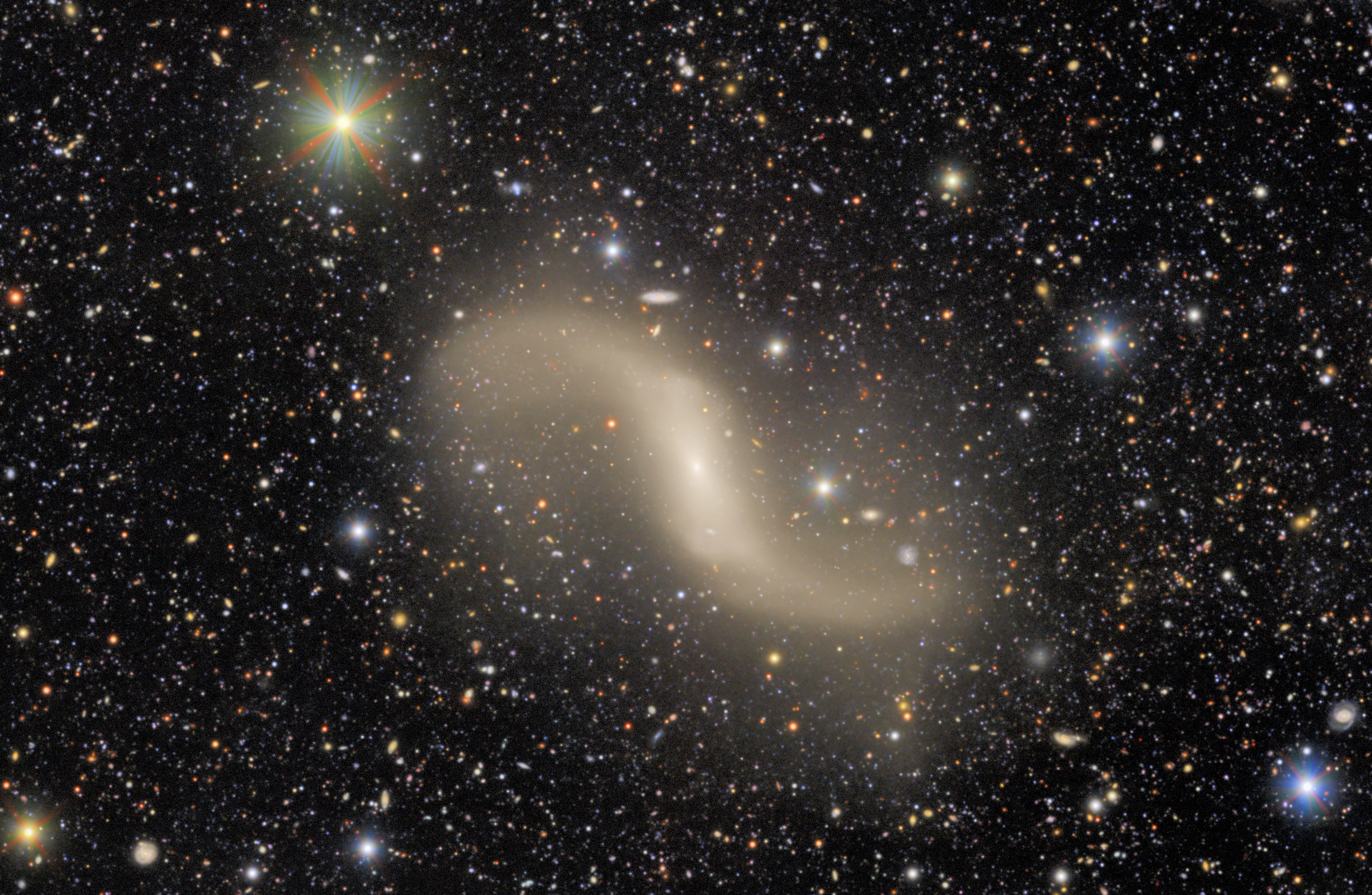
- NGC 4488 imaged by the Vera C. Rubin Observatory

Observation data (J2000 epoch)
- Constellation: Virgo
- Right ascension: 12^{h} 30^{m} 51.3823^{s}
- Declination: +08° 21′ 36.121″
- Redshift: 0.003269±0.0000167
- Heliocentric radial velocity: 980±3 km/s
- Distance: 63.3 ± 4.6 Mly (19.42 ± 1.40 Mpc)
- Group or cluster: Virgo Cluster
- Apparent magnitude (V): 13.1

Characteristics
- Type: SB0/a(s) pec
- Size: ~35,100 ly (10.77 kpc) (estimated)
- Apparent size (V): 3.17′ × 0.87′

Other designations
- VCC 1318, UGC 7653, MCG +02-32-104, PGC 41363, CGCG 070-137

NGC 4488 is a peculiar lenticular galaxy located in the constellation of Virgo. Its velocity with respect to the cosmic microwave background is 1,317±24 km/s, which corresponds to a Hubble distance of 63.3 ± 4.6 Mly (19.42 ± 1.40 Mpc). However, one non-redshift measurement gives a much closer distance of 26.26 Mly (8.050 Mpc). The galaxy was discovered by astronomer William Herschel on December 28, 1785. NGC 4488 is a member of the Virgo Cluster.

== Structure ==
NGC 4488 has an unusual rectangular-shaped structure similar to the galaxy LEDA 74886. The galaxy does not have an inner disk. It also has two arms coming off diagonally opposite sides suggesting that NGC 4488 has had a gravitational interaction with another galaxy.

== See also ==
- List of NGC objects (4001–5000)
- LEDA 74886
- Peculiar galaxy
