= NGC 1357 =

Galaxy in the constellation Eridanus

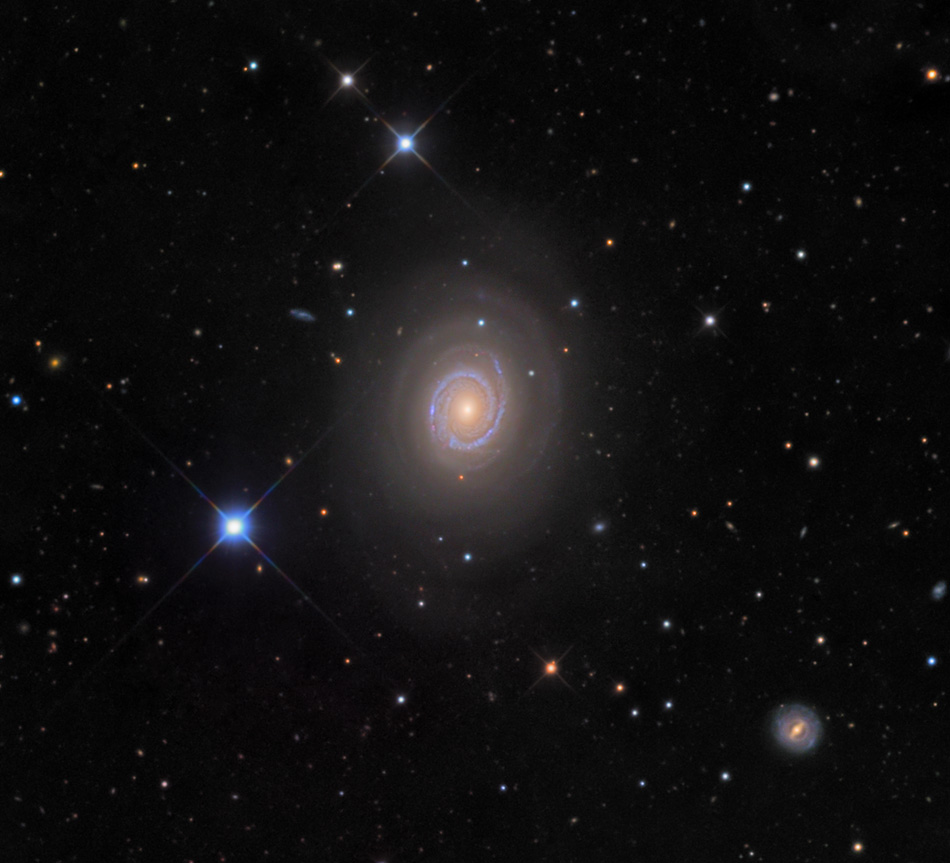
- Image of NGC 1357 created in October 2010

Observation data (J2000 epoch)
- Constellation: Eridanus
- Right ascension: 03^{h} 33.171^{m}
- Declination: −13° 39′
- Redshift: 2018 ± 9
- Distance: 28.1 Mpc (92 Mly)
- Apparent magnitude (V): 11.5

Characteristics
- Type: Sab
- Apparent size (V): 3.2′ × 2.4′
- Notable features: Spiral galaxy with gas ring

Other designations
- NGC 1357, GSC 05302-00236, LEDA 13166, MCG-02-10-001, 6dFGS gJ033317.1-133951, HIPASS J0333-13, 2MASX J03331709-1339509, [CHM2007] LDC 251 J033317.09-1339509

NGC 1357 is an isolated spiral galaxy situated in constellation of Eridanus. Located about 92 million light years away, it is a member of the Eridanus Cluster of galaxies, a cluster of about 200 galaxies, being the farthest known member. Based on location and distance, NGC 1357 is located at the very edge on the Eridanus Cluster. It was discovered by William Herschel on February 1, 1785.

== Characteristics ==
NGC 1357 has a Hubble classification of Sab, which indicates it is a spiral galaxy with no bar. It is moving away from the Milky Way at a rate of 2,018 km/s. Its size on the night sky is 3.2' x 2.4' which is proportional to its real size of the 85 000 ly.

NGC 1357's surface brightness profile shows a small bulge and a large, fairly exponential disk. However, the automatic bulge-disk fit would give an unreliably large bulge extending through the whole galaxy (lowermost row). A more reasonable fit is obtained by adding another exponential disk component to the inner part of the galaxy (upper profile). This inner component corresponds to the region of tightly wound spiral arms with higher surface brightness.

Analysis of the NGC 1357's spectra revealed the ionised calcium.

== NGC 1407 Group ==
NGC 1357 is a member of the NGC 1407 group (also known as LGG 100), which contains of at least 9 galaxies, including NGC 1400, NGC 1407 and NGC 1452.
