= Taft E. Armandroff =

American astronomer

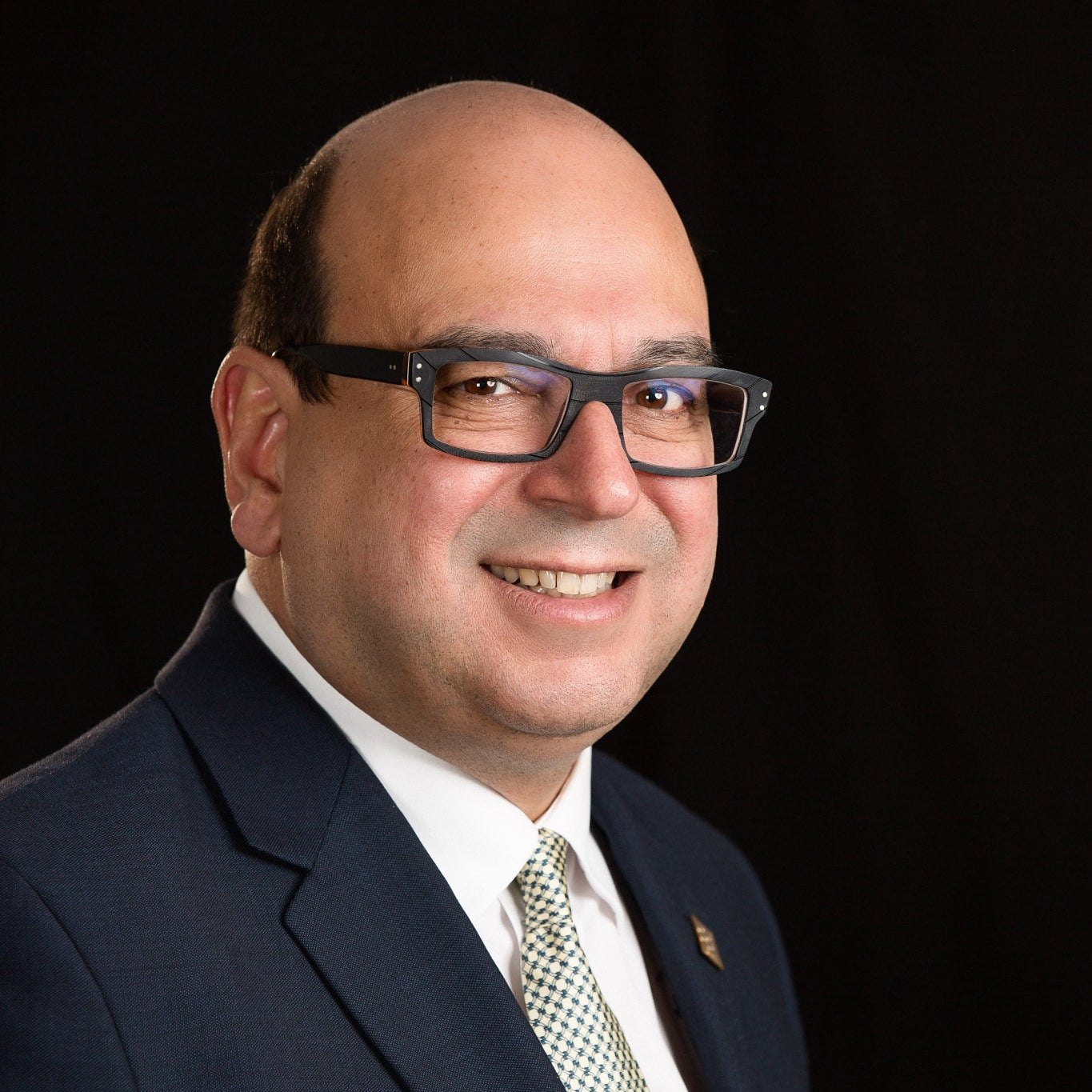
- Education: Wesleyan University in Middletown, Connecticut (BA in Astronomy); Yale University in New Haven, Connecticut (MS, MPhil & PhD Astronomy)
- Scientific career
- Fields: Astronomy
- Workplaces: University of Texas at Austin
- Website: mcdonald.utexas.edu/directory/taft-armandroff

Taft E. Armandroff is an American astronomer, currently director of McDonald Observatory, a professor and the Frank and Susan Bash Endowed Chair, at the University of Texas at Austin. He is Chair of the Giant Magellan Telescope Board of Directors.

== Education ==
He received a B.A. in Astronomy (with High Honors) from Wesleyan University in 1982; an M.S. in Astronomy from Yale University in 1984; an M. Phil. in Astronomy from Yale University in 1985; and a Ph.D. in Astronomy from Yale University in 1988.

== Awards ==
His awards and honors include: Sturm Memorial Lecturer, Wesleyan University (2009); Distinguished Alumnus Award, Wesleyan University (2007); AURA Science Award, (1999); Dirk Brouwer Prize for a Contribution of Unusual Merit to Astronomy, Yale University (1988); Littell Prize in Astronomy, Wesleyan University (1982).
