= William Johnson McDonald =

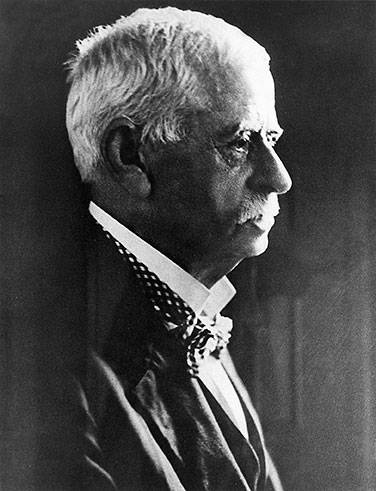
- Circa 1920
- Born: December 21, 1844
- Died: February 8, 1926 (aged 81)
- Occupations: Banker, Lawyer
- Military career
- Allegiance: Confederate States of America
- Branch: Confederate States Army
- Service years: 1864-1865
- Rank: Private
- Units: 32nd Texas Cavalry
- Conflicts: American Civil War

William Johnson McDonald (December 21, 1844 – February 8, 1926, though some sources give his date of death as February 6 ) was a Paris, Texas banker who left $850,000 (the bulk of his fortune) to the University of Texas System to endow an astronomical observatory.

The bequest was unexpected, and his will was contested, but after prolonged legal disputes the university received the money. At the time, the university had no faculty of astronomy, so in 1932 it formed a collaboration with Otto Struve at the University of Chicago, who supplied astronomers.

The McDonald Observatory is named after him, with Otto Struve becoming the first director.

McDonald was the eldest of the three sons of Sarah Johnson and Henry Graham McDonald of Paris, Texas. As a young man, he was a private in the Confederate Army. He became wealthy through his businesses as a lawyer and a banker, but remained frugal his entire life. He never married and had no children.
