= Harold Johnson (astronomer) =

American astronomer (1921–1980)

Harold Lester Johnson
- Born: April 17, 1921; Denver, Colorado, US
- Died: April 2, 1980 (aged 58); Mexico City, Mexico
- Education: University of Denver; University of California, Berkeley
- Known for: UBV photometric system
- Spouse: Mary Elizabeth Jones
- Awards: 1956 Helen B. Warner Prize American Astronomical Society, Member of the National Academy of Sciences
- Scientific career
- Fields: Astronomy
- Workplaces: Lowell Observatory, University of Wisconsin–Madison, Yerkes Observatory, McDonald Observatory, University of Texas–Austin, Lunar and Planetary Laboratory, National Autonomous University of Mexico
- Thesis: The Development of an Electronic Device for the Measurement of Stellar Spectrograms for Radial Velocity. (1948)
- Doctoral advisor: Harold Weaver

Harold Lester Johnson (April 17, 1921 – April 2, 1980) was an American astronomer.

Harold Johnson was born in Denver, Colorado, on April 17, 1921. He received his early education in Denver public schools and went to the University of Denver, graduating with a degree in mathematics in 1942. Johnson was recruited by the MIT Radiation Laboratory to work on World War II related radar research. After the war Johnson began graduate studies in astronomy at University of California, Berkeley where he completed his thesis under Harold Weaver in 1948.

In the following years working at Lowell Observatory, University of Wisconsin–Madison, Yerkes Observatory (where he met William Wilson Morgan), McDonald Observatory, University of Texas–Austin, the Lunar and Planetary Laboratory in Tucson, Arizona, and the National Autonomous University of Mexico he applied his instrumental and electronic talents to developing and calibrating astronomical photoelectric detectors. He died of a heart attack in Mexico City in 1980. He and his wife, Mary Elizabeth Jones, had two children.

Johnson was awarded the Helen B. Warner Prize by the American Astronomical Society in 1956. He was elected to the National Academy of Sciences in 1969. He is remembered for introducing the UBV photometric system (also called the Johnson or Johnson-Morgan system), along with William Wilson Morgan in 1953, which he later expanded also with infrared filters in the 1960s.
