= NGC 1452 =

Galaxy in the constellation Eridanus

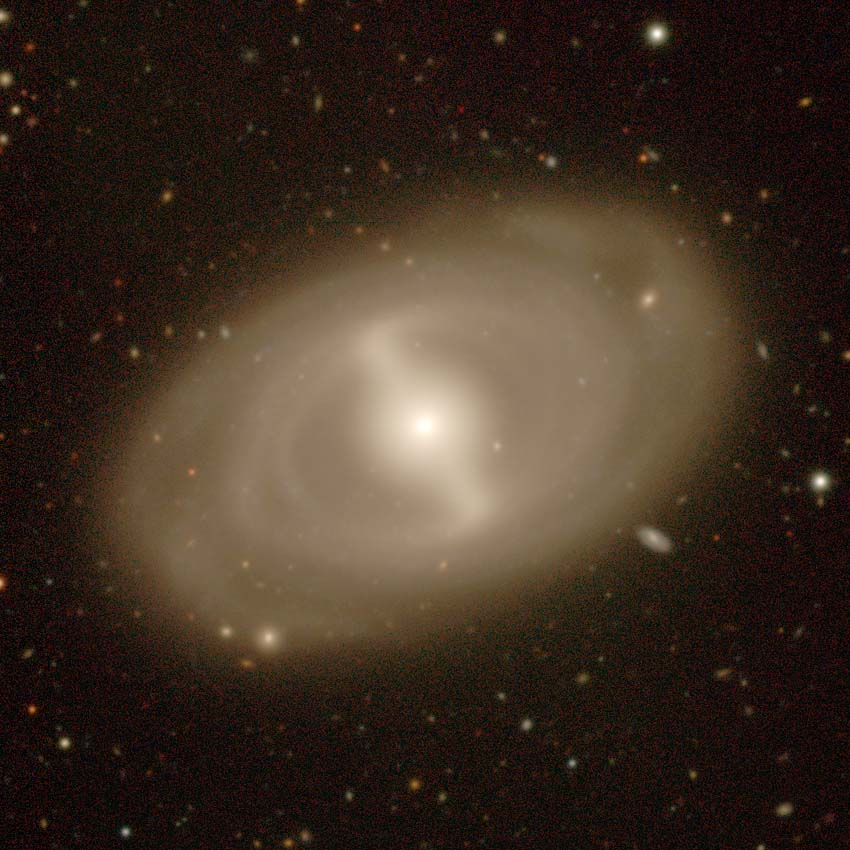
- NGC 1452 with legacy surveys

Observation data (J2000 epoch)
- Constellation: Eridanus
- Right ascension: 03^{h} 45.223^{m}
- Declination: −18° 37′
- Distance: 24.5 Mpc (79.9 Mly)
- Apparent magnitude (V): 11.8
- Magnitude (J): 9.659
- Magnitude (H): 8.966
- Magnitude (K): 8.673

Characteristics
- Type: SB0-a
- Apparent size (V): 2.8′ × 1.5′

Other designations
- NGC 1455, ESO 549-12, MCG -3-10-44, IRAS 03430-1847, PGC 13765

NGC 1452 (or NGC 1455) is a barred lenticular galaxy in the constellation Eridanus. Located 80 million light years away, it is one of the farther galaxies of the Eridanus Cluster, a cluster of approximately 200 galaxies. It was discovered on October 6, 1785 by William Herschel.

The galaxy has a Hubble classification of SB0-a, indicating it is a lenticular galaxy with a bar. NGC 1452's bar extends from the core to the middle of the galaxy. It size on the night sky is 2.8' x 1.5' which is proportional to the real size of 65,000 light-years.

== NGC 1407 Group ==
The galaxy is a member of the NGC 1407 Group or LGG 100, a small group of the galaxies inside the Eridanus Cluster, together with the galaxies NGC 1407, NGC 1400 and NGC 1357.

== See also ==
- NGC 1407, brightest member of NGC 1407 Group
- NGC 1460, another barred lenticular galaxy, with huge bar
- Lenticular galaxy
