= Eridanus Group =

Galaxy cluster in the constellation Eridanus

Observation data (Epoch J2000)
- Constellation: Eridanus
- Right ascension: 03^{h} 06^{m} to 04^{h} 30^{m}
- Declination: −10° to −30°
- Brightest member: NGC 1407
- Number of galaxies: ~200

Other designations
- Eridanus Cloud

The Eridanus Group, sometimes called the Eridanus Cloud, is a nearby loose grouping of galaxies at a mean distance of approximately 75 Mly (23 ± 2 Mpc) in the constellation Eridanus. Redshift values show that there are approximately 200 galaxies associated with the group, approximately 70% of which are spiral and irregular type galaxies while the remaining 30% are elliptical and lenticular types.

== Characteristics ==
The concentration of galaxies in the Eridanus area was first identified by Baker in 1933. A more in depth study and discussion of the region was carried out by de Vaucouleurs in 1975. Work by Willmer et al. in 1989 suggested that the Group is condensing from the Hubble Flow and is a prominent feature in the large-scale system called the Eridanus-Fornax-Dorado Filament. The group extends over approximately 10 Mpc and on the sky is bounded by the lines of 3hr6' and 4hr30' of Right Ascension and −10° and −30° Declination.

The galaxies in the Eridanus Group are distributed in several clumps and overall the group has the appearance of an intermediate system, its structure being somewhere between that of a loose group (like the Ursa Major Group) and a cluster (like the Virgo Cluster). Dynamic studies indicate that the group is at an important stage of its evolution with the types of galaxy present already fixed. This suggests that galaxies involved in the formation of rich clusters are already highly evolved, a finding which supports aspects of Cold Dark Matter theories.

The Group is forming from the merger of a number of sub-groups. The group is predicted to be in an early stage of formation and exhibits a high number of early type galaxies. The sub-groups involved in the merger include the Fornax I Cluster, the Eridanus Cluster (or Fornax II Cluster) and the Dorado Group. In some studies these have been broken down into further sub-groups including the Eridanus Group, the NGC 1407 Group and the NGC 1332 Group. Bright individual galaxies which are members of the group include NGC 1407 (the brightest), NGC 1332, NGC 1309 and NGC 1209.

The group's significant population of S0 type galaxies has made it a target for investigation because of an ongoing debate over the formation of this species of galaxy. Within the surveyed sub-groups of the Eridanus Group it has been found that the brightest galaxy is often the elliptical or S0 type galaxy. Present theories on galaxy evolution suggest that S0 type galaxies form as part of the evolutionary process. This would suggest that there has been time for significant evolution of the galaxies within the Group, despite the young age of the Group itself.

== Sub-groups ==
The term Eridanus Group has also been applied to a sub-group of the Eridanus Cloud. This grouping of galaxies is found at a distance of 14.2 Mpc. The Eridanus Group is known to have 31 members with nine listed in the New General Catalogue and two listed in the Index Catalogue. The brightest galaxy in this sub-group is the large elliptical, NGC 1395. The sub-group is not centred on any one galaxy and studies of X-ray emissions from the group indicate that it is dynamically young. It is involved, along with the NGC 1407 and NGC 1332 sub-groups, in the formation of the Eridanus galaxy supergroup with the three groups predicted eventually to merge to form a single poor cluster with a combined mass of approximately 7 × 10^{13} solar masses. The NGC 1407 sub-group contains most of the early type galaxies associated with the Eridanus Group.
