= UBV photometric system =

Wide-band photometric system used in astronomy

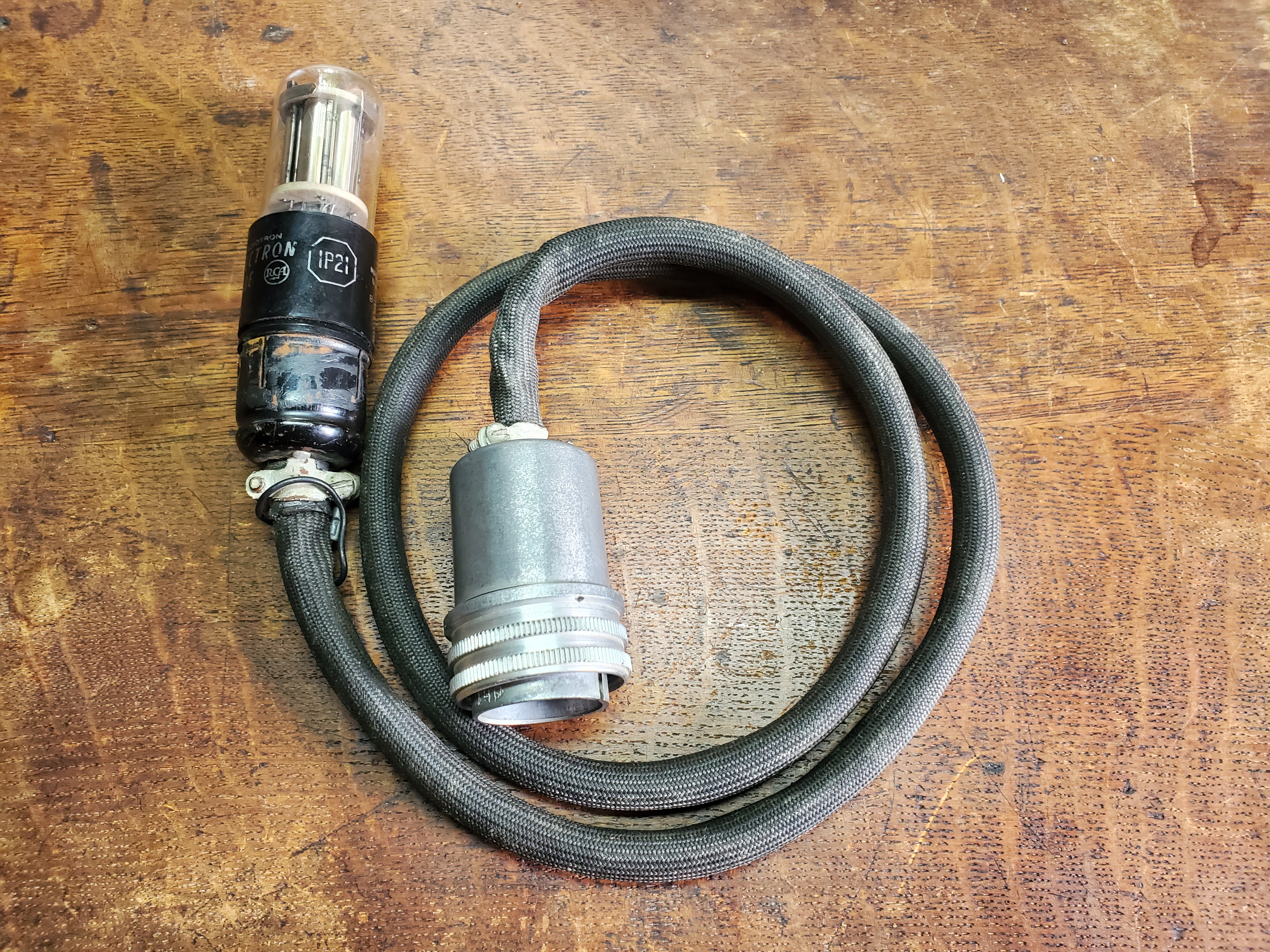
1P21 photomultiplier tube

The UBV photometric system (from ultraviolet, blue, visual), also called the Johnson system (or Johnson–Morgan system), is a photometric system usually employed for classifying stars according to their colors. It was the first standardized photometric system. The apparent magnitudes of stars in the system are often used to determine the color indices B−V and U−B – the difference between the B and V magnitudes and the U and B magnitudes respectively. The system is defined using a set of color optical filters in combination with an RMA 1P21 photomultiplier tube.

The choice of colors on the blue end of the spectrum was assisted by the bias that photographic film has for those colors. It was introduced in the 1950s by American astronomers Harold Lester Johnson and William Wilson Morgan. A 13 in (330 mm) telescope and the 82 in (2,100 mm) telescope at McDonald Observatory were used to define the system. The filters that Johnson and Morgan used were Corning 9863 for U and 3384 for V. The B filter used a combination of Corning 5030 and Schott GG 13.

The system has a key limit drawback. The short wavelength cutoff that is the shortest limit of the U filter is set by any given terrestrial atmosphere rather than the filter itself; thus, it (and observed magnitudes) varies chiefly with altitude and atmospheric water (humidity plus condensation into clouds). However, many measurements have been made in this system, including thousands of the bright stars.

== Wavelengths and filters ==
Wavelengths

The filters are selected so that the mean wavelengths of response functions (at which magnitudes are measured to mean precision) are 364 nm for U, 442 nm for B, 540 nm for V. Zero-points were calibrated in the B−V (B minus V) and U−B (U minus B) color indices selecting such A0 main sequence stars which are not affected by interstellar reddening. These stars correspond with a mean effective temperature (T_{eff} (K)) of between 9727 and 9790 Kelvin, the latter being stars with class A0V.

The following table shows the characteristics of each of the filters used (represented colors are only approximate):

UBV photometric system filter wavelengths
	U	B	V
Peak wavelength (nm)	364	442	540

Note: colors are only approximate and based on wavelength to sRGB representation (when possible).

== Extensions ==
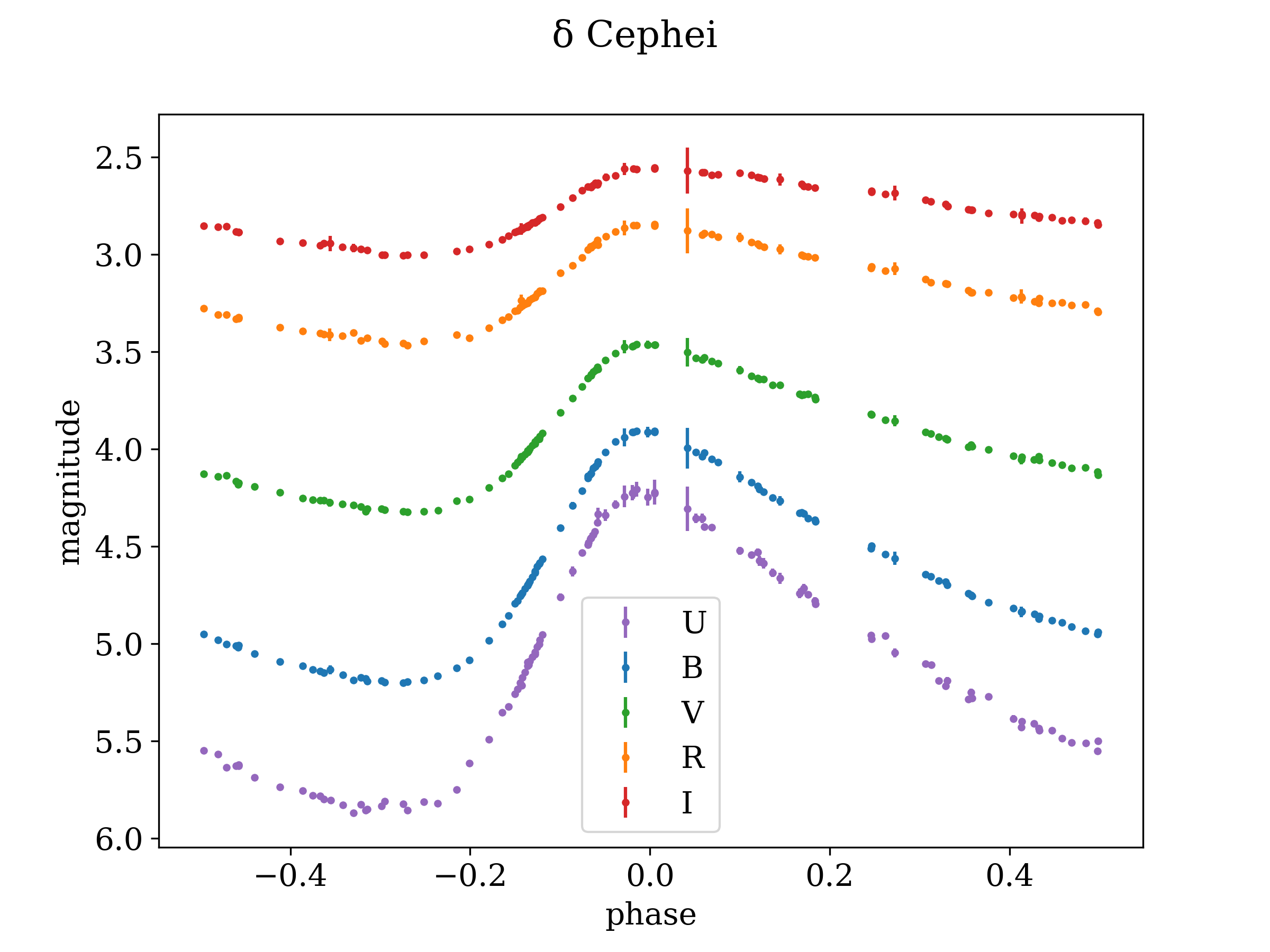
UBVRI light curves of the prototype Cepheid variable, Delta Cephei

The Johnson–Kron–Cousins UBVRI photometric system is a common extension of Johnson's original system that provides redder passbands.

UBVRI photometric system filter wavelengths
	U	B	V	R	I
Peak wavelength (nm)	343	425	547	590	860–950

Note: colors are only approximate and based on wavelength to sRGB representation (when possible).

== See also ==
- Strömgren photometric system
