= NGC 1407 =

Elliptical galaxy in the constellation Eridanus

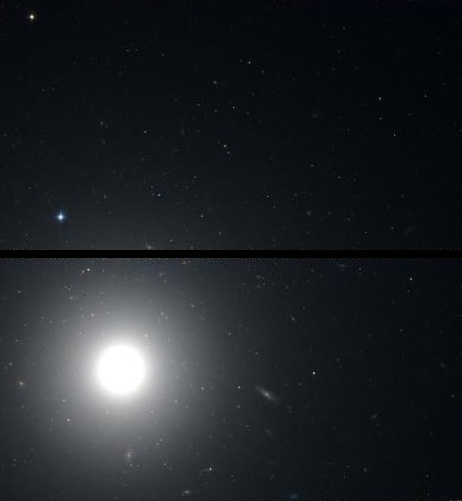
- NGC 1407 by Hubble Space Telescope

Observation data (J2000 epoch)
- Constellation: Eridanus
- Right ascension: 03^{h} 40^{m} 11.9^{s}
- Declination: −18° 34′ 48″
- Redshift: 1,779±9 km/s
- Distance: 76 Mly (23 Mpc)
- Apparent magnitude (V): 9.7
- Magnitude (J): 7.640
- Magnitude (H): 6.992
- Magnitude (K): 6.702

Characteristics
- Type: E0
- Apparent size (V): 4.6′ × 4.3′

Other designations
- ESO 548- G 067, PGC 13505

NGC 1407 is an elliptical galaxy in the equatorial constellation of Eridanus. It is at a distance of 76 million light-years from Earth. It is the brightest galaxy in the NGC 1407 Group, part of the Eridanus Group, with NGC 1407 being its brightest member. NGC 1400, the second-brightest of the group lies 11.8 arcmin away.

NGC 1407 is X-ray luminous, with high hot gas Fe abundance, and with evidence of recurrent radio outbursts. In the central area of the galaxy are present old stars, with mean age 12.0 ± 1.1 Gyrs, that are metal rich and with supersolar abundances of α-elements. Observations indicate that NGC 1407 hasn't recently undergone strong star-formation activity. The galaxy hosts a supermassive black hole with a mass 1.12 ± 0.42 billion solar masses, based on velocity dispersion.

The galaxy was discovered by 6 October 1785 by William Herschel.

== NGC 1407 Group ==
NGC 1407 is a member of the NGC 1407 group (also known as LGG 100), which contains of at least 9 galaxies, including NGC 1400, NGC 1357 and NGC 1452.

== Gallery ==
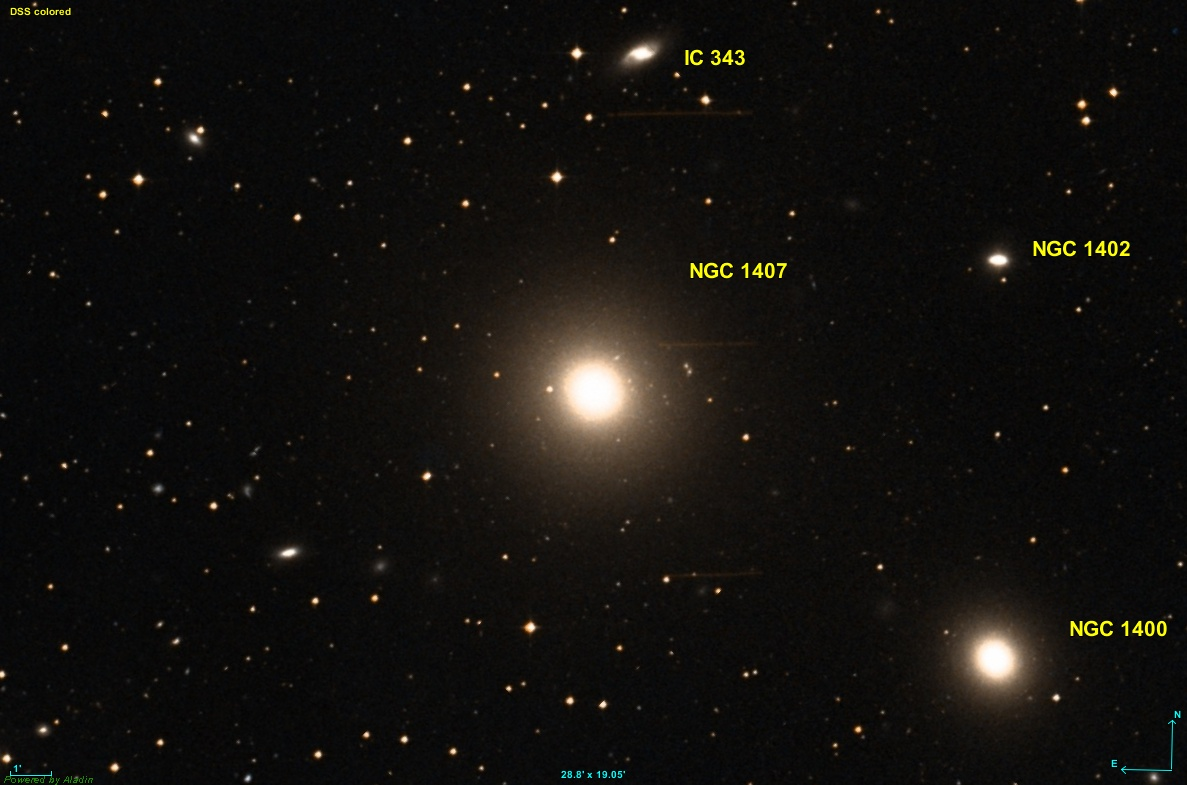
DSS image of NGC 1407

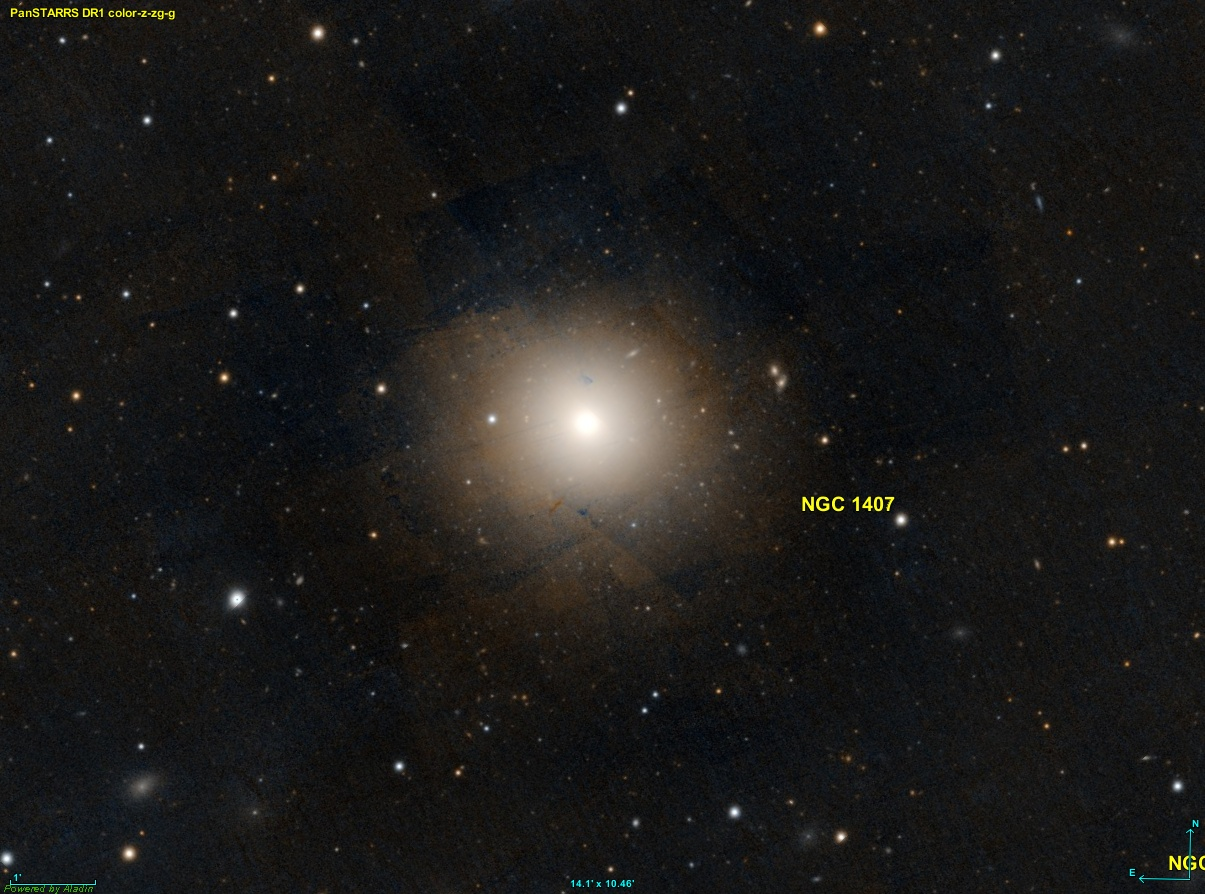
Pan-STARRS image of NGC 1407

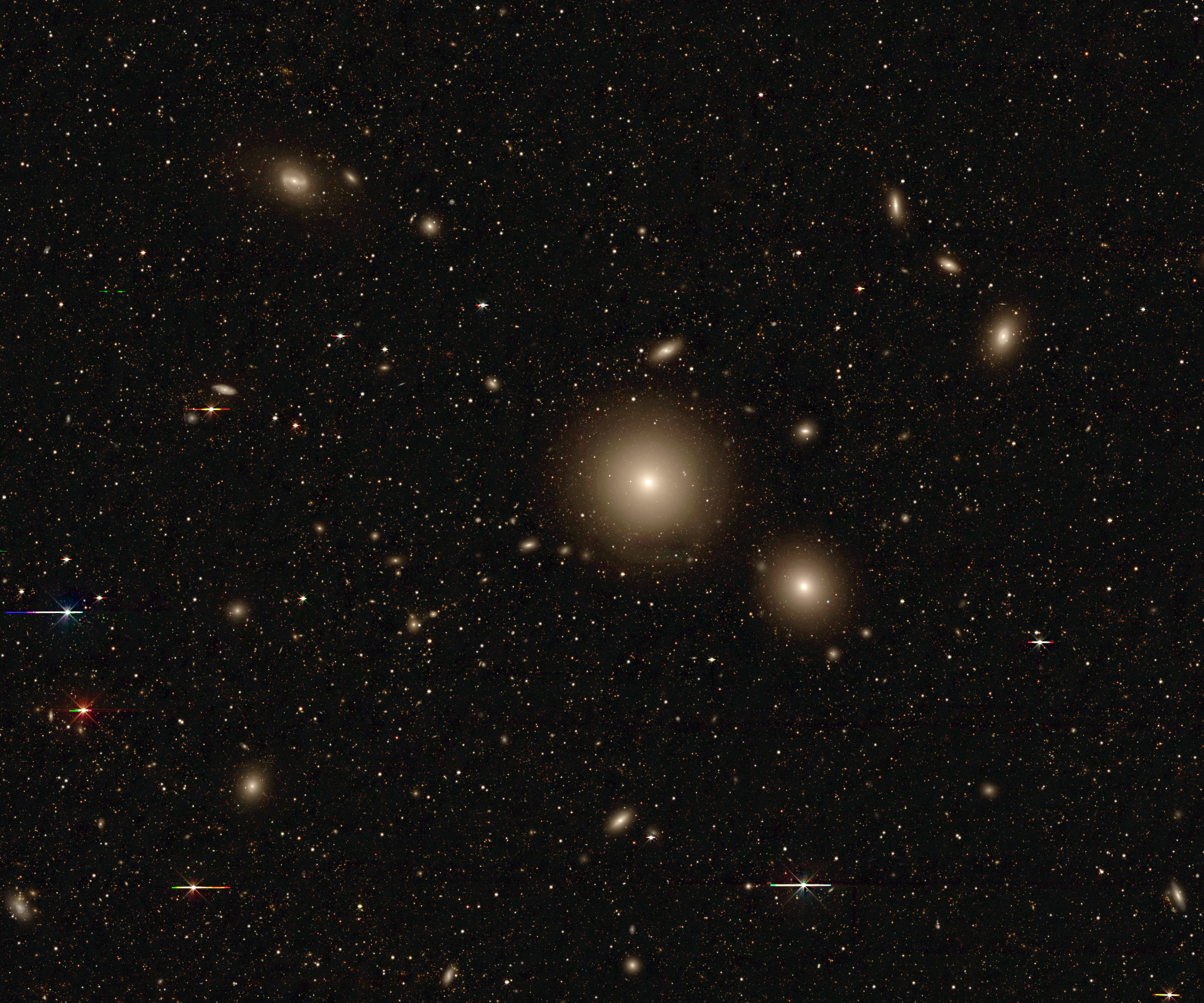
NGC 1407 group with the legacy surveys
