= McDonald Observatory =

Observatory in Texas, US

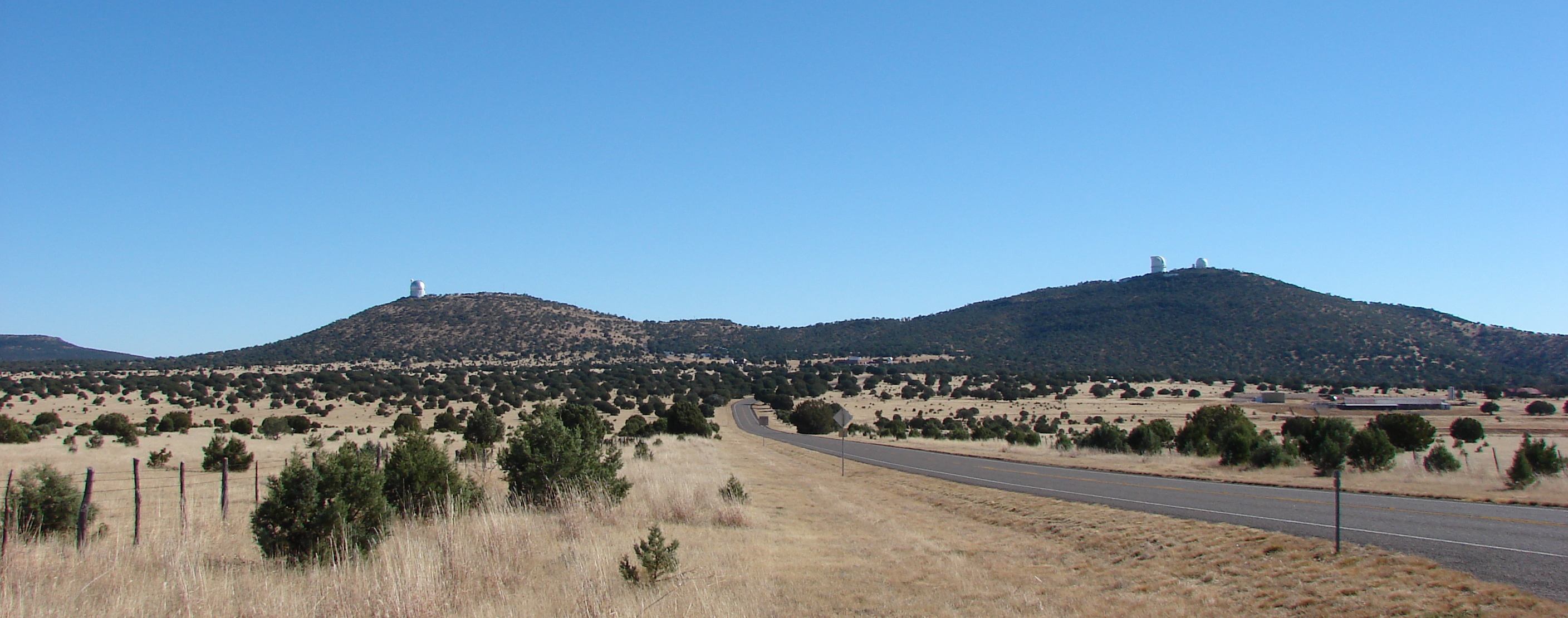
- The observatory from the southeast. The Hobby–Eberly Telescope on Mt. Fowlkes (left) and the Harlan J. Smith and Otto Struve Telescopes on Mt. Locke (right).
- Alternative names: 711 MC
- Named after: William Johnson McDonald
- Organization: University of Texas at Austin
- Observatory code: 711
- Location: Jeff Davis County, Texas
- Coordinates: 30°40′17″N 104°01′19″W
- Altitude: 2,077 m (6,814 ft)
- Established: 1933
- Website: mcdonaldobservatory.org
- Telescopes: Frank N. Bash Visitors Center; Harlan J. Smith Telescope; Hobby–Eberly Telescope; Otto Struve Telescope
- Related media on Commons

McDonald Observatory is an astronomical observatory located near the unincorporated community of Fort Davis in Jeff Davis County, Texas, United States. The facility is located on Mount Locke in the Davis Mountains of West Texas, with additional facilities on Mount Fowlkes, approximately 1.3 kilometers (0.81 mi) to the northeast. The observatory is part of The University of Texas at Austin. It is an organized research unit of the College of Natural Sciences.

The observatory produces StarDate, a daily syndicated radio program consisting of short segments related to astronomy that airs on both National Public Radio and commercial radio stations — about 400 affiliates in all.

== History ==
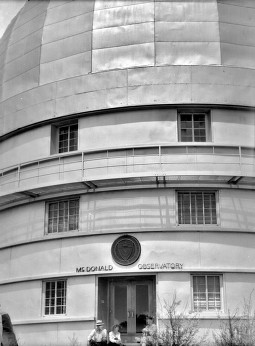
McDonald Observatory

McDonald Observatory was originally endowed by the Texas banker William Johnson McDonald (1844–1926), who left about $1 million — the bulk of his fortune — to The University of Texas at Austin to endow an astronomical observatory. Edwin Hockaday Fowlkes, step-son of the land's original owner John Chandler Prude, donated the land to the University of Texas to build the observatory. The provision of the will was challenged by McDonald's relatives, but after a long legal fight, the university received about $800,000 from the estate and construction began at Mt. Locke. The then-unnamed Otto Struve Telescope was dedicated on May 5, 1939, and at that time was the second largest telescope in the world. McDonald Observatory was operated under contract by The University of Chicago until the 1960s, when control was transferred to The University of Texas at Austin under the direction of Harlan J. Smith.

Research today at the McDonald Observatory encompasses a wide variety of topics and projects, including the search for and understanding of planetary systems, stars and stellar spectroscopy, the interstellar medium, extragalactic astronomy, and theoretical astronomy. The Hobby-Eberly Telescope Dark Energy Experiment, or HETDEX, is a multi-year undertaking to decode the nature of dark energy.

Directors

- Otto Struve (1932–1950)
- Gerard Peter Kuiper (Sept. 1947–Dec. 1949, Sept. 1957–Mar. 1959)
- Bengt Georg Daniel Strömgren (Jan. 1951–Aug. 1957)
- William Wilson Morgan (Apr. 1959–Aug. 1963)
- Harlan James Smith (Sept. 1963–1989)
- Frank N. Bash (1989–2003)
- David L. Lambert (2003–2014)
- Taft E. Armandroff (2014–present)

== Observatory ==
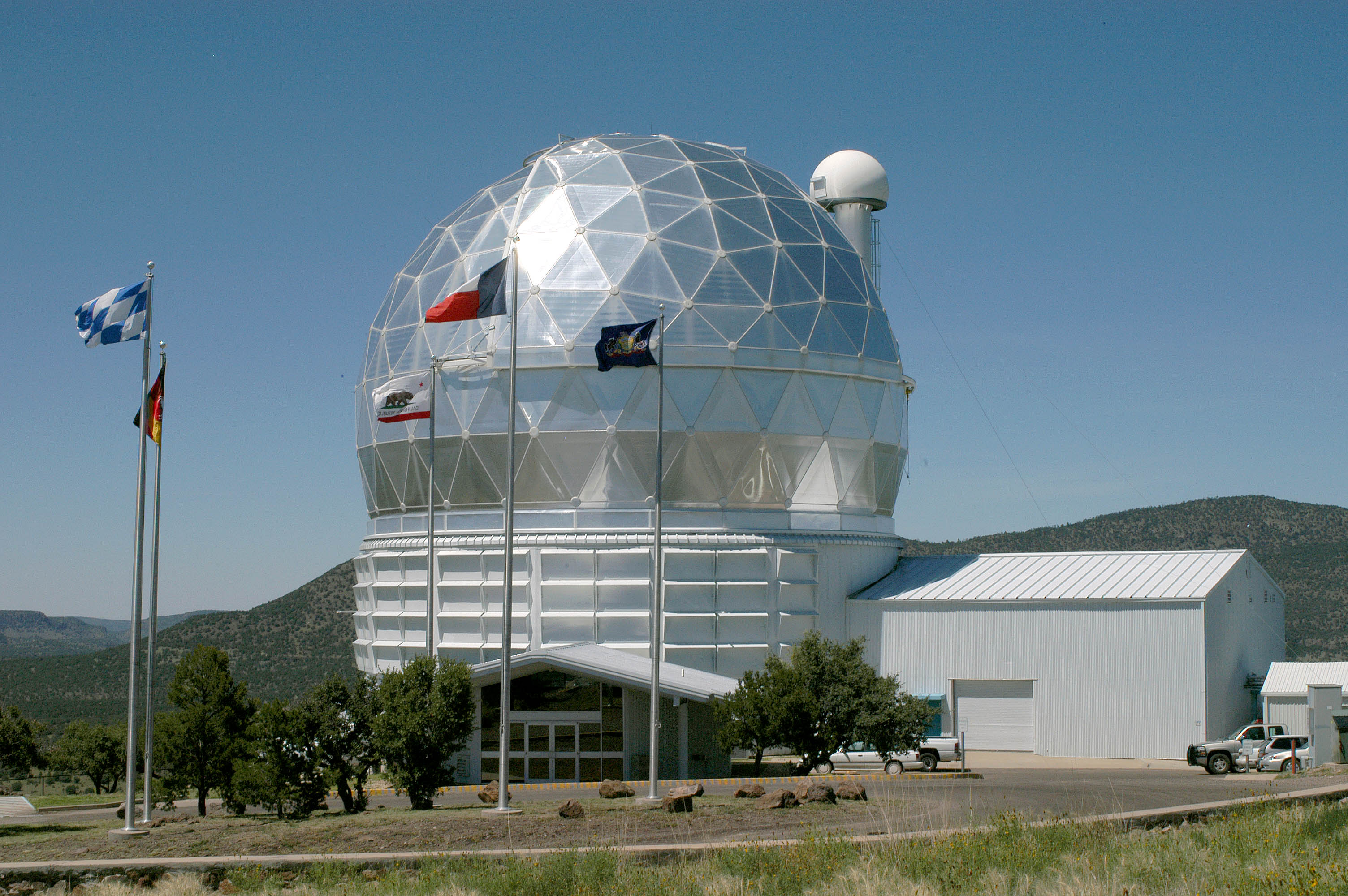
Dome of the 10 m Hobby-Eberly Telescope. It houses one of the largest optical telescopes in the world.

McDonald Observatory is equipped with a wide range of instrumentation for imaging and spectroscopy in the optical and infrared spectra, and operates the first lunar laser ranging station. It works closely with the astronomy department of The University of Texas at Austin while maintaining administrative autonomy. The high and dry peaks of the Davis Mountains make for some of the darkest and clearest night skies in the region and provide excellent conditions for astronomical research.

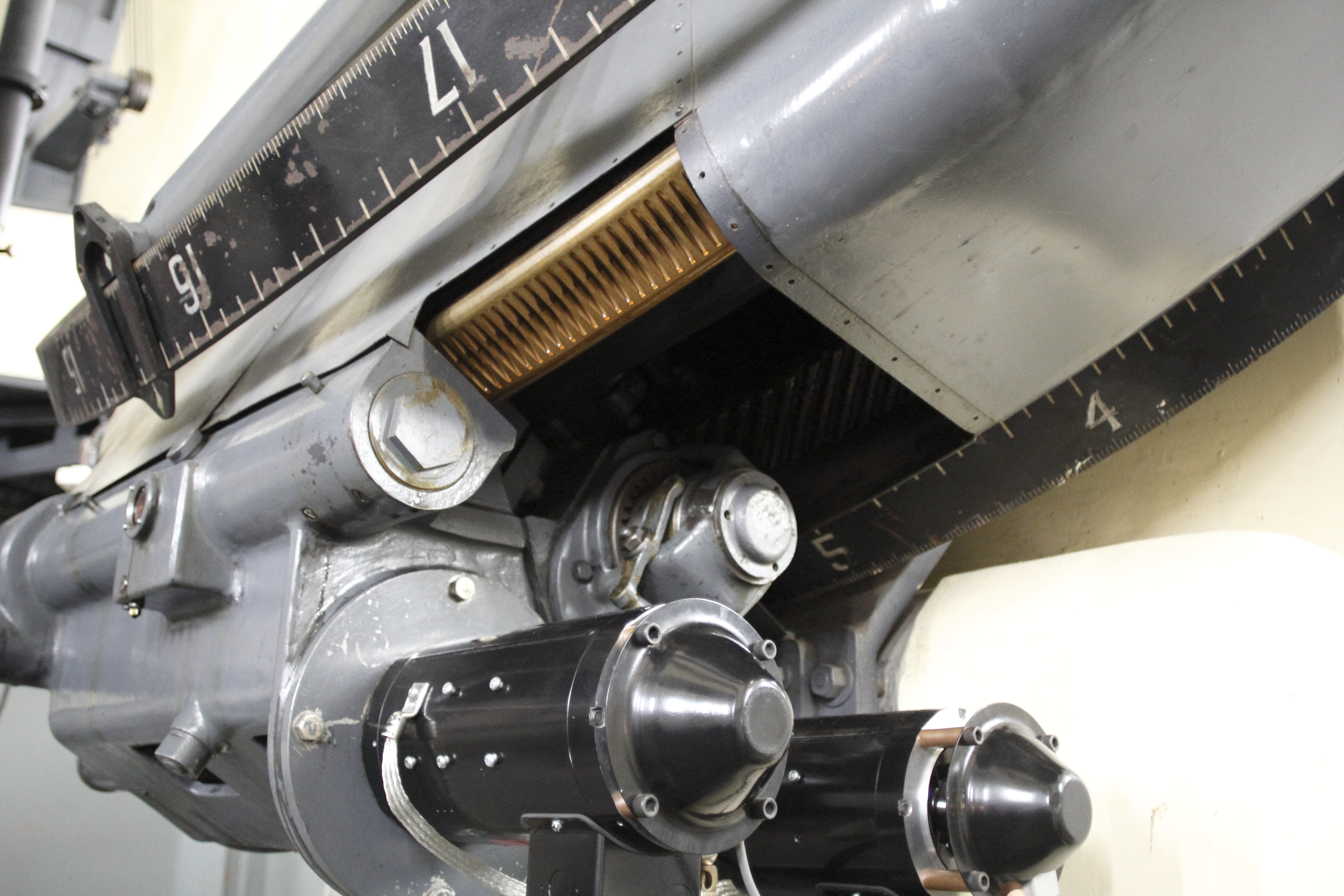
Electric motors and position sensors at the Otto Struve Telescope at the McDonald Observatory, Texas

The Otto Struve Telescope, dedicated in 1939, was the first large telescope built at the observatory. It is located on Mt. Locke at an altitude of 2,070 m (6,790 ft). The summit of Mt. Locke, accessed by Spur 78, is the highest point on Texas highways. The Harlan J. Smith Telescope, also on Mt. Locke, was completed in 1968.

The Hobby-Eberly Telescope (HET), dedicated in late 1997, is located on the summit of Mt. Fowlkes at 2,030 m (6,660 ft) above sea level. It is operated jointly by The University of Texas at Austin, Pennsylvania State University, LMU Munich, and Georg-August University of Göttingen. As of 2019, after upgrades the HET is tied with the Keck Telescopes as the second or third largest telescope in the world. However, its cost was about 20% that of other similarly sized telescopes in use today due to its optimization for spectroscopy.

Additionally, The University of Texas at Austin is a founding partner of the international collaboration to build the Giant Magellan Telescope. McDonald Observatory administrators, scientists, and engineers are heavily involved in the endeavor. Director Taft Armandroff currently serves as Vice Chair to the GMT Board of Directors, and has served as chair.

== Telescopes ==
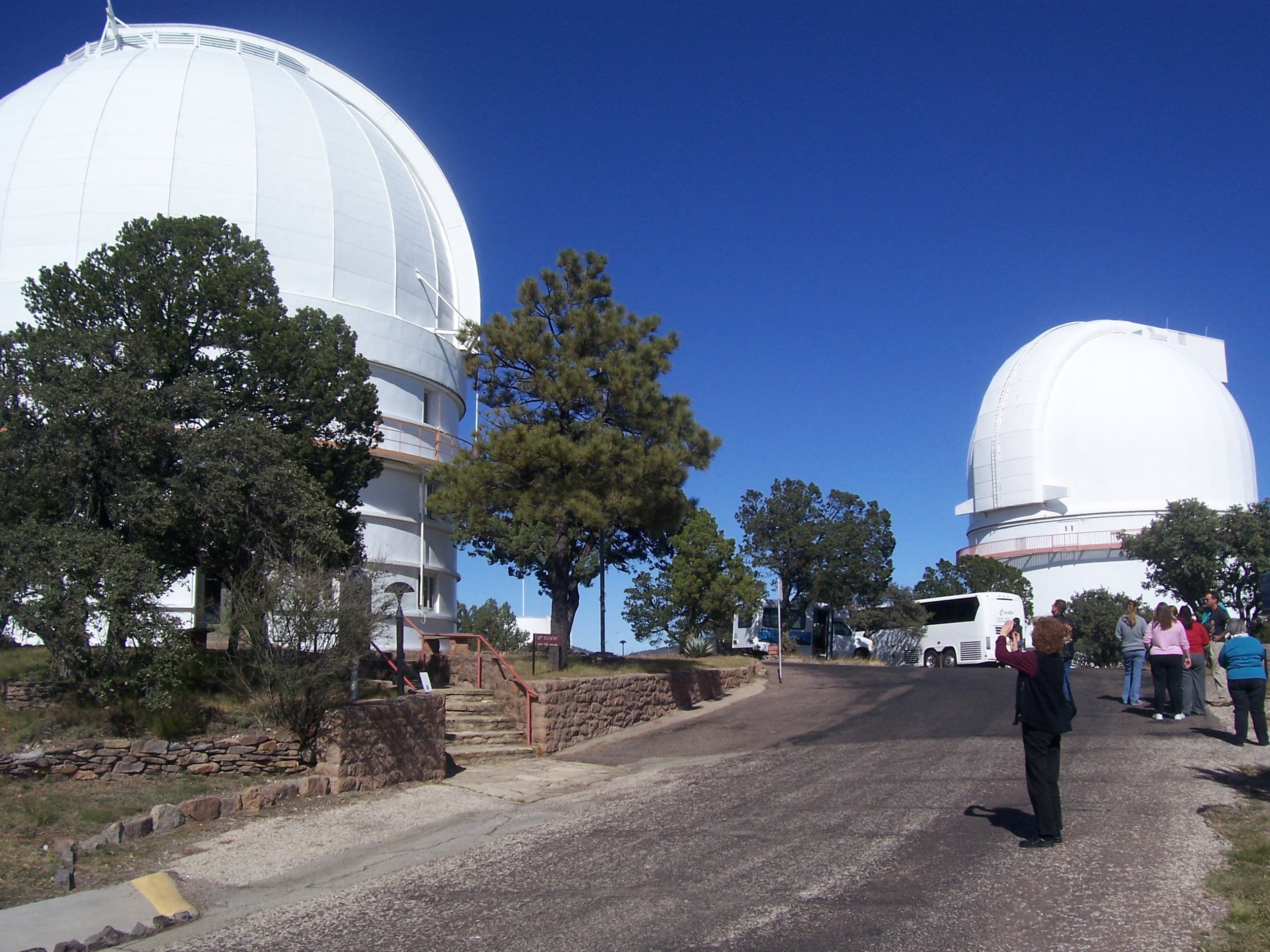
Domes of the 2.1 m Otto Struve Telescope (left) and 2.7 m Harlan J. Smith Telescope (right)

Currently, the observatory operates four research telescopes at its West Texas site:

- 10 m (390 in) Hobby-Eberly Telescope on Mt. Fowlkes
- 2.7 m (107 in) Harlan J. Smith Telescope on Mt. Locke
- 2.1 m (82 in) Otto Struve Telescope on Mt. Locke
- 0.8 m (30 in) large format imaging telescope on Mt. Locke

A 0.9 m (36 in) telescope, formerly used for research, is now used for visitor programs.

=== Tenant telescopes ===
The two peaks also host a number of other instruments:

- The 1.2 m (47 in) Monitoring Network of Telescopes (MONET/North) Telescope on Mt. Locke is a companion to the MONET/South at the South African Astronomical Observatory in Sutherland, and was built by Halfmann Teleskoptechnik.
- Two 1.0 m (39 in) telescopes and one 0.4 m (16 in) telescope located on Mt. Fowlkes are part of the Las Cumbres Observatory Global Telescope Network.
- A 0.5 m (20 in) Ritchey-Chretien reflector owned by Boston University on Mt. Locke is used for optical aeronomy.
- The 0.4 m (16 in) Robotic Optical Transient Search Experiment (ROTSE) reflector on Mt. Fowlkes is used to search for the optical signature of gamma-ray bursts.

=== Former telescopes ===
- The 4.9 m (16 ft) Millimeter Wave Observatory (MWO) radio telescope operated on Mt. Locke until 1988. MWO was a joint project between the UT Department of Astronomy and the Department of Electrical Engineering. The site of the dish antenna is now occupied by the BLOOMhouse, the UT School of Architecture's entry in the 2007 Solar Decathlon, which is now used for staff housing.
- The McDonald Laser Ranging System (MLRS) used a 0.76 m (30 in) telescope on Mt. Fowlkes from 1982 to 2019 for satellite laser ranging and lunar laser ranging.

== Climate ==
The observatory experiences a semi-arid climate (Köppen BSk) with cool, dry winters and hot, wetter summers.

- Coordinates: 30.70528°N 104.02333°W
- Elevation: 6,790 feet (2,070 m)

Climate data for Mount Locke, Texas (Jan 1, 1935–Mar 31, 2013)
Month	Jan	Feb	Mar	Apr	May	Jun	Jul	Aug	Sep	Oct	Nov	Dec	Year
Record high °F (°C)	80 (27)	79 (26)	88 (31)	94 (34)	96 (36)	104 (40)	100 (38)	104 (40)	96 (36)	94 (34)	82 (28)	80 (27)	104 (40)
Mean daily maximum °F (°C)	53.5 (11.9)	56.9 (13.8)	63.7 (17.6)	71.4 (21.9)	78.6 (25.9)	84.5 (29.2)	82.7 (28.2)	81.3 (27.4)	76.6 (24.8)	70.5 (21.4)	61.2 (16.2)	54.4 (12.4)	69.6 (20.9)
Daily mean °F (°C)	42.7 (5.9)	45.4 (7.4)	51.0 (10.6)	58.3 (14.6)	65.5 (18.6)	71.4 (21.9)	70.8 (21.6)	69.8 (21.0)	65.5 (18.6)	59.3 (15.2)	50.0 (10.0)	44.0 (6.7)	57.8 (14.3)
Mean daily minimum °F (°C)	32.0 (0.0)	33.9 (1.1)	38.2 (3.4)	45.2 (7.3)	52.4 (11.3)	58.2 (14.6)	58.9 (14.9)	58.4 (14.7)	54.4 (12.4)	48.0 (8.9)	38.7 (3.7)	33.6 (0.9)	46.0 (7.8)
Record low °F (°C)	−10 (−23)	−6 (−21)	4 (−16)	11 (−12)	26 (−3)	36 (2)	40 (4)	40 (4)	29 (−2)	13 (−11)	8 (−13)	−2 (−19)	−10 (−23)
Average precipitation inches (mm)	0.68 (17)	0.49 (12)	0.40 (10)	0.50 (13)	1.63 (41)	2.49 (63)	3.83 (97)	3.69 (94)	2.95 (75)	1.61 (41)	0.61 (15)	0.60 (15)	19.46 (494)
Average snowfall inches (cm)	1.9 (4.8)	0.8 (2.0)	0.2 (0.51)	0.1 (0.25)	0.0 (0.0)	0.0 (0.0)	0.0 (0.0)	0.0 (0.0)	0.0 (0.0)	0.1 (0.25)	0.4 (1.0)	1.2 (3.0)	4.7 (12)
Average precipitation days (≥ 0.001)	3.75	3.13	2.62	2.77	5.93	8.75	12.00	11.56	9.32	5.91	2.94	3.29	71.45
Source: Western Regional Climate Center, Desert Research Institute

== Visiting ==
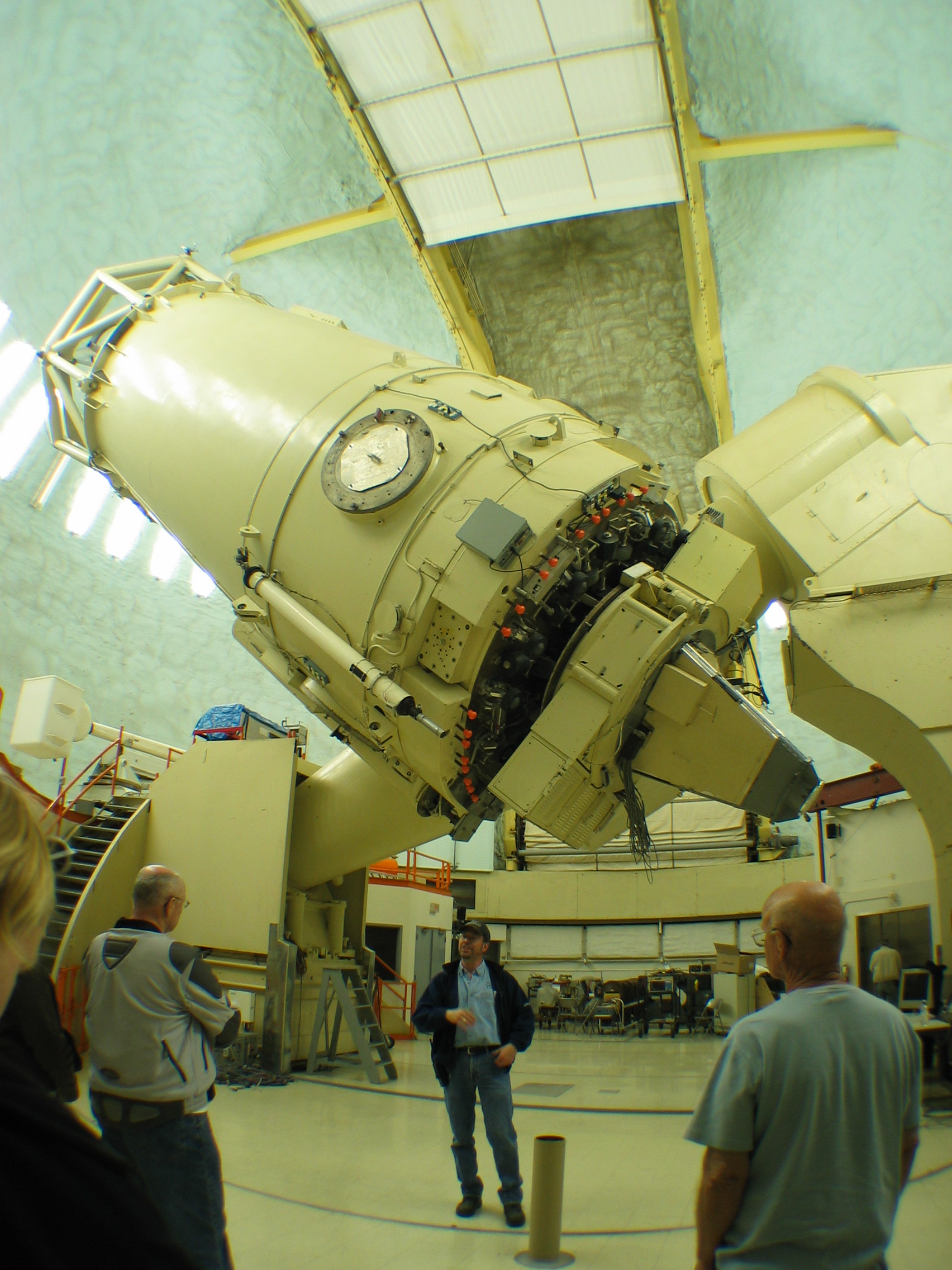
Inside the dome of the Harlan J. Smith telescope during a guided tour

The Frank N. Bash Visitors Center, located between Mt. Locke and Mt. Fowlkes, includes a gift shop and interactive exhibit hall. The Visitors Center conducts daily live solar viewings in a large theater and tours of the observatory's largest telescopes. It also hosts evening star parties, every Tuesday, Friday, and Saturday evening which allow visitors to look through numerous telescopes of various sizes in the Rebecca Gale Telescope Park.

Special Viewing Nights, during which visitors can stay on-site (not required for the programs) and view directly through eyepieces on the 0.9 m and Struve (2.1m) telescopes, are held on a reservation-only basis.

== Gallery ==
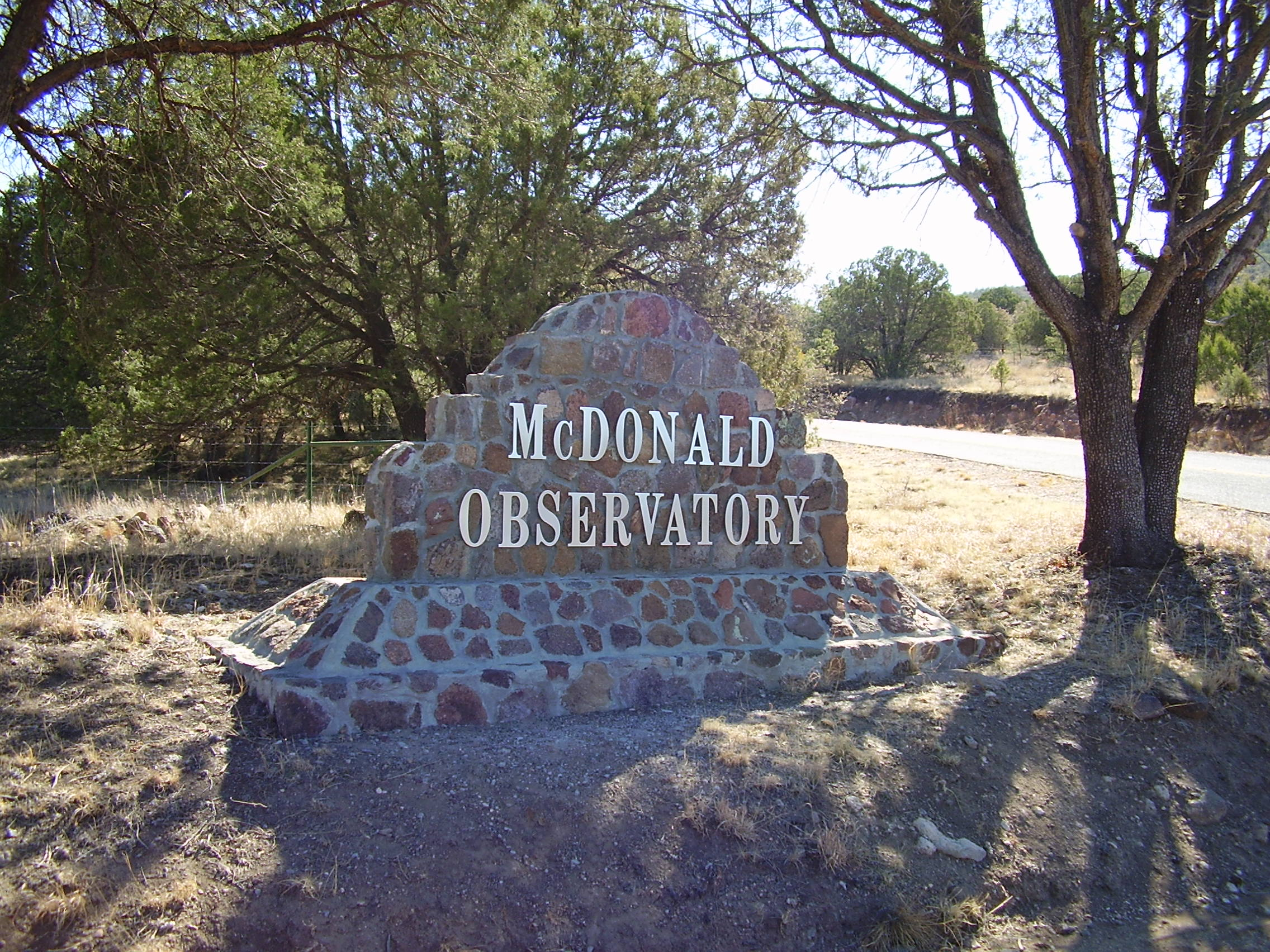
Entrance to the observatory

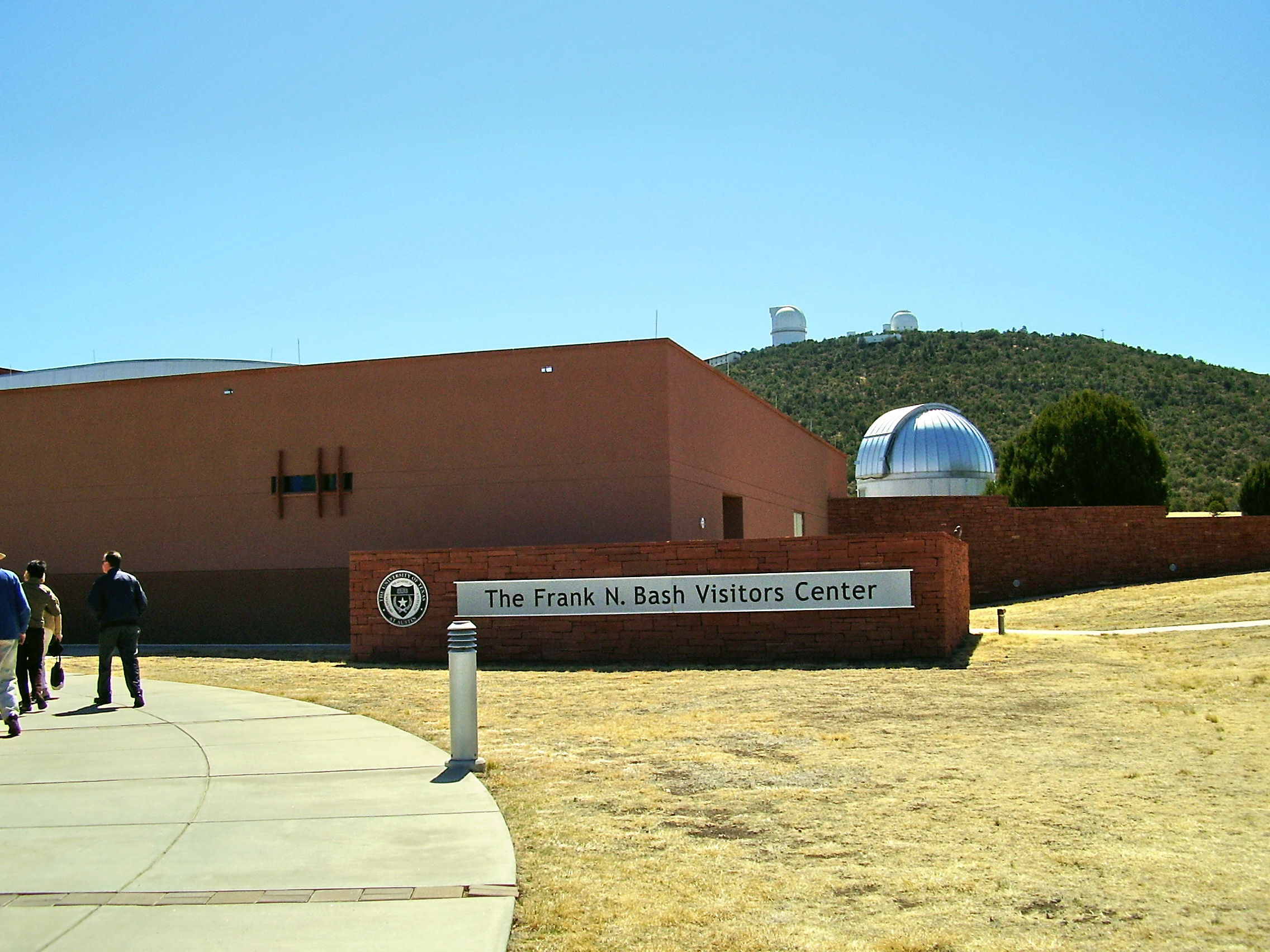
Frank N. Bash Visitors Center

McDonald Observatory's Visitor Center's sun dial

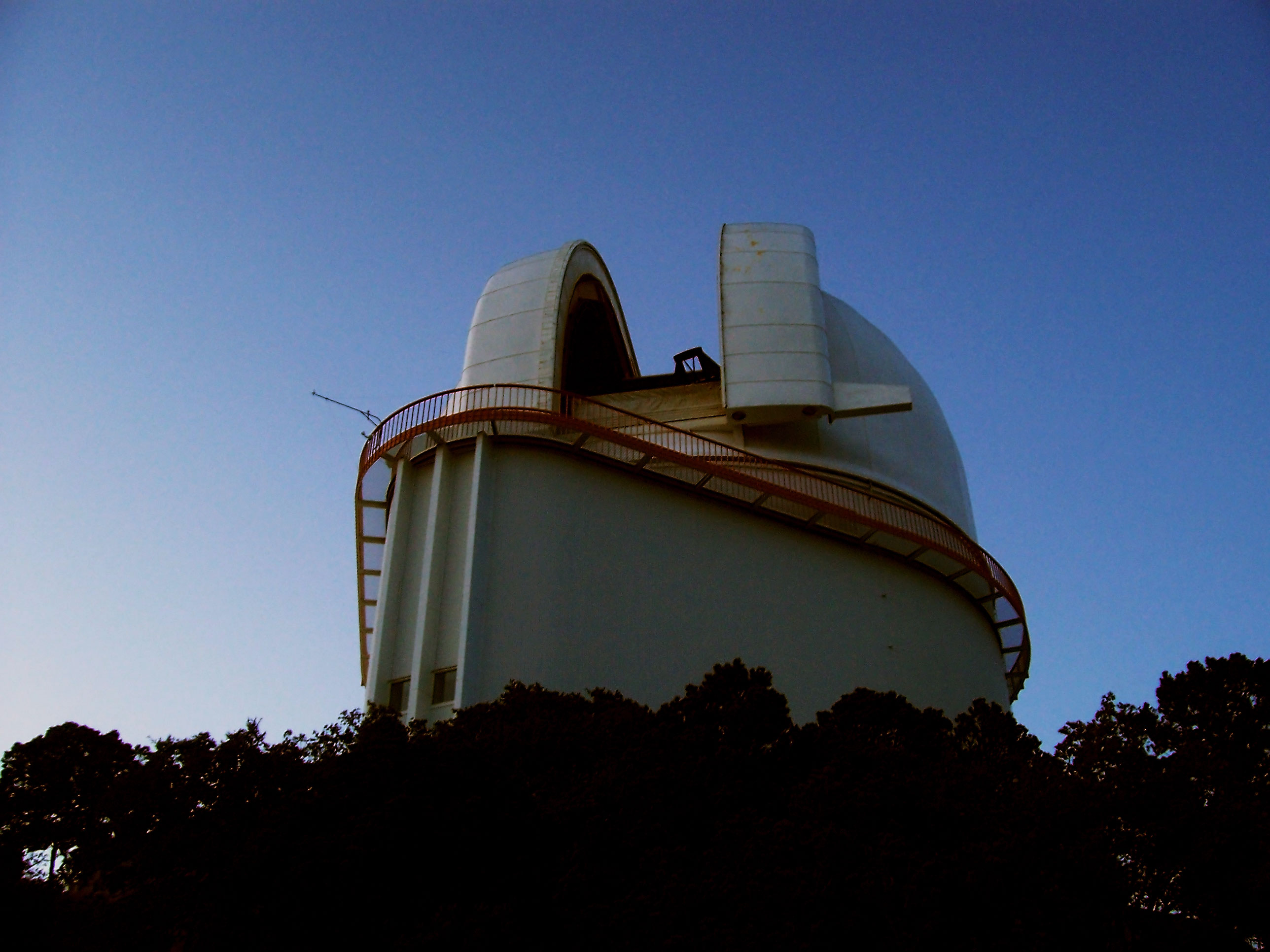
Harlan J. Smith Telescope preparing for observations

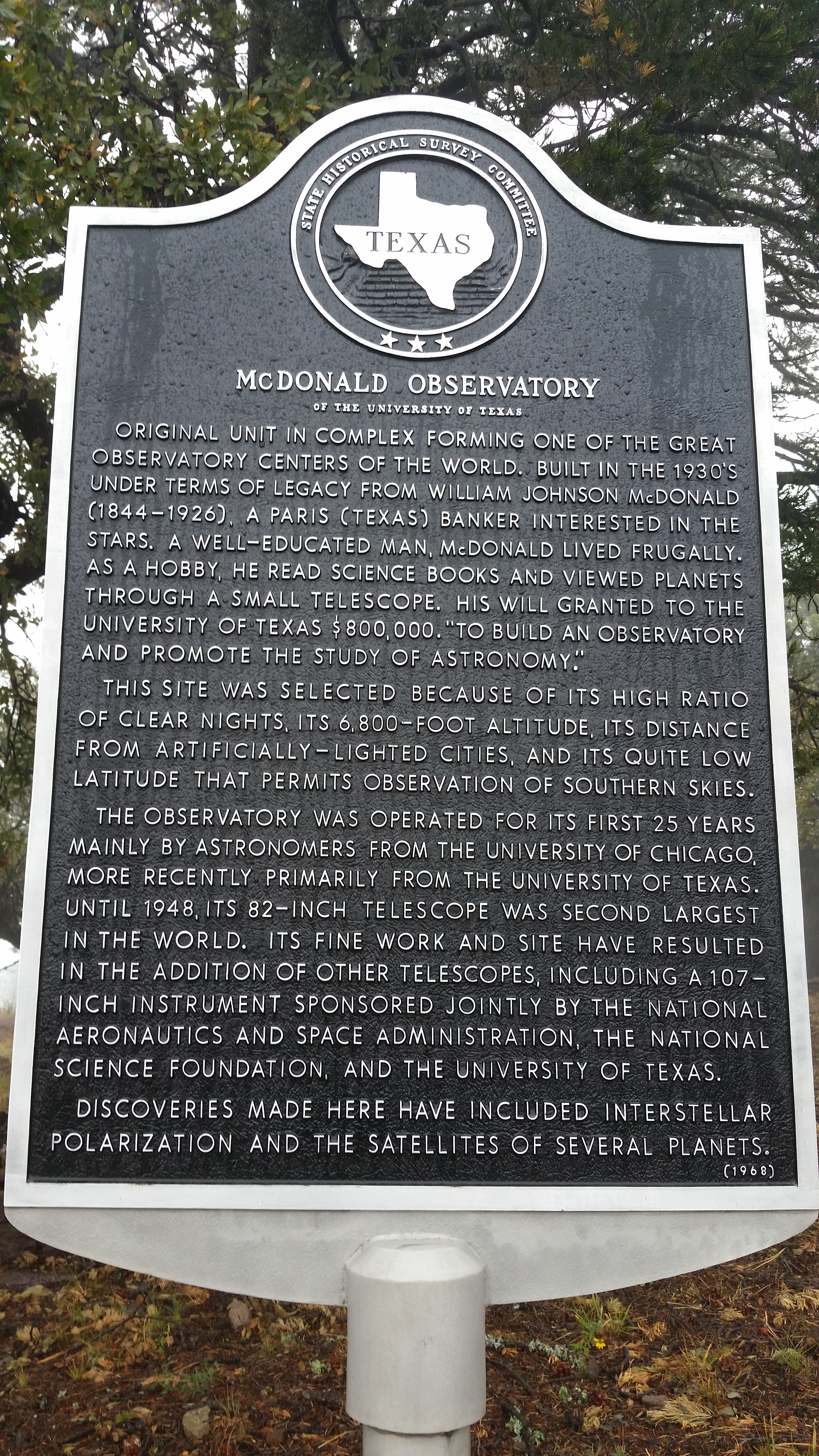
Texas historical marker

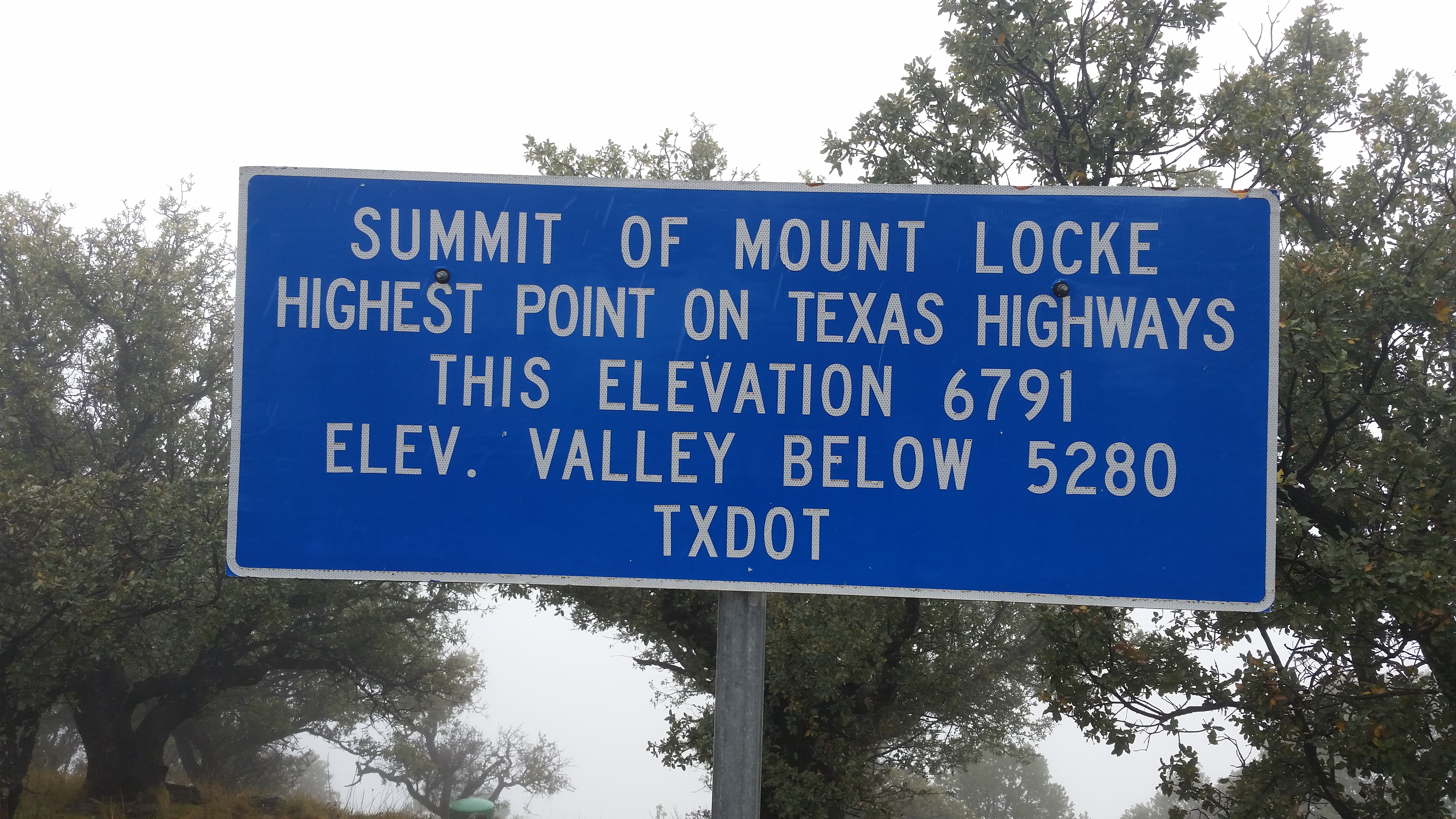
Texas highway marker at McDonald Observatory

== See also ==
- List of astronomical observatories
