= Schure =

Schure is a Dutch surname. It is a variant of Schuren, which is a toponymic surname as well as an ordinary word (cf. schuren 'to scour'). In the Netherlands, there were 39 people with the surname Schure and 272 with the surname ter Schure as of 2007. The 2010 United States census found 169 people with the surname Schure, making it the 105,600th-most-common name in the country. This represented a decrease from 181 people (92,601st-most-common) in the 2000 United States census. In both censuses, about 98% of the bearers of the surname identified as non-Hispanic white. Notable people with the surname include:

- Alexander Schure (1920–2009), American academic and entrepreneur
- Joyce Schure (fl. 1992–present), costume designer
- Matthew Schure (1948–2023), American academic
- Vincent ter Schure (born 1979), Dutch Paralympic cyclist

== See also ==
- Édouard Schuré (1841–1929), French philosopher and writer
- Schor, Schore, Schoor/van Schoor, Schorr, Shor, Shore, Shorr, Schur, Schure, Schürer/Schuerer/Schürrer, Schurr, Shur, Shure, Shurer
