= Schurr =

Schurr is a German surname of multiple possible origins. Notable people with the surname include:

- Christian Schurr Voight (born 1984), Mexican swimmer
- Wayne Schurr (1937–2024), American baseball player
- Claude Schürr, French painter
- Gérald Schurr, French art critic
- Théophile Schürr, French soldier

== See also ==
- Schurr High School, high school in California, United States
- Schor, Schore, Schoor/van Schoor, Schorr, Shor, Shore, Shorr, Schur, Schure, Schürer/Schuerer/Schürrer, Schurr, Shur, Shure, Shurer
