= Shure (surname) =

Shure is an English surname. It is the surname of:

- Aaron Shure, American television writer and producer
- Brian Shure (born 1952), American printmaker and painter
- Leonard Shure (1910–1995), American concert pianist
- Michael Shure (born 1966), American television host and political commentator
- Patricia D. Shure, American mathematics educator
- Sidney N. Shure, founder of the Shure audio electronics corporation

== See also ==
- Schor, Schore, Schoor/van Schoor, Schorr, Shor, Shore, Shorr, Shur, Schur, Schürer/Schuerer/Schürrer, Schurr
