= Shurer =

Shurer is a surname. Notable people with the surname include:

- Osnat Shurer (born 1970/71), Israeli animation producer
- Ronald J. Shurer (1978–2020), United States Army sergeant; recipient of the Congressional Medal of Honor

== See also ==
- Schor, Schore, Schoor/van Schoor, Schorr, Shor, Shore, Shorr, Shur, Schur, Schürer/Schuerer/Schürrer, Schurr
