= Shur =

Shur may refer to:

== Places ==
- Shur (Bible), a location in the Hebrew Bible
- Shur-e Qarah Kand, a village in East Azerbaijan Province, Iran
- Shur, Fars, a village in Iran
- Shur, Qazvin, a village in Iran
- Shur, Iranshahr, a village in Sistan and Baluchestan Province, Iran
- Shur, Tehran, a village in Iran
- Shur-e Bala, a village in Iran
- Shur-e Sofla, a village in Iran
- Shur Qazi, a village in Iran

== People ==
- Gerald Shur (1933-2020), American lawyer, and the founder of the US Federal Witness Protection Program
- Itaal Shur (born 1966), American songwriter
- Michael Shur (born 1942), Soviet-born American professor of solid-state electronics and physics

== Other uses ==
- USS Shur (SP-782), a United States Navy patrol boat 1917–1919
- Dastgāh-e Šur, an Iranian/Persian musical mode
- Shur (mugham), an Azerbaijani musical mode

== See also ==
- Schor, Schore, Schoor/van Schoor, Schorr, Shor, Shore, Shorr, Schur
