= Abraham ben Joseph of Orleans =

12th-century French Tosafist

- רבי אברהם בן יוסף
- Born: c. 1140; Orléans, France
- Occupations: Tosafist
- Relatives: Joseph ben Isaac Bekhor Shor (father); Saadia Bekhor Shor (brother)

Abraham ben Joseph of Orleans (Hebrew: רבי אברהם בן יוסף c. 1140) was an early 12th-century French Tosafist and the son of Joseph Bekhor Shor and the brother of Saadia Bekhor Shor. Some have suggested that he is identical with Abraham ben Rabbi Joce (the Chief Rabbi of London in 1186). Many of his interpretations of the Talmud are quoted several times in the Tosafot.

== Biography ==
Rabbi Abraham, was born in Orléans, France in about 1140. His father was a famous Tosafist and a leading member of the Orleans Jewish community. In his early years, Rabbi Abraham occupied a similar position. It was also during this time that he became acquainted with Rabbeinu Tam. Sometime after his daughter married Judah ben Isaac Messer Leon, Rabbi Abraham may have moved to London where he served as Chief Rabbi in 1186. Amongst his alleged descendants are Ephraim Zalman Shor, Aaron ben Samuel of Frankfurt, and Joseph Brodsky.
