= Schur =

Schur is a German or Jewish surname of multiple possible origins. Notable people with the surname include:

- Alexander Schur (born 1971), German footballer
- Dina Feitelson-Schur (1926–1992), Israeli educator
- Friedrich Schur (1856-1932), German mathematician
- Fritz Schur (born 1951), Danish businessman
- Issai Schur (1875–1941), Lithuanian-German-Israeli mathematician
- Kévin Schur (born 1990), French footballer
- Max Schur (1897–1969), Austrian physician
- Michael Schur (born 1975), American television producer and writer
- Philipp Johann Ferdinand Schur (1799-1878), German-Austrian botanist
- Täve Schur (born 1939), German cyclist

== See also ==
- Schor, Schore, Schoor/van Schoor, Schorr, Shor, Shore, Shorr, Schur, Schure, Schürer/Schuerer/Schürrer, Schurr, Shur, Shure, Shurer
