= Ephraim Zalman Shor =

Czech rabbi

- Title: Tevu'ot Shor

Personal life
- Born: Ephraim Zalman Shor c. 1550 Pošná, Kingdom of Bohemia
- Died: 2 October 1633 (1 Tishrei 5424) Lublin, Polish–Lithuanian Commonwealth
- Buried: Lviv
- Spouse: Hanna Henele Wahl Katzenallenbogen
- Children: Jacob Shor, Rachel Shor, Zemach Shor, Hesa Shor, Yehuda Shor, Margella Shor
- Parents: Naftali Zvi Hirsch Shor (father); Rivka Shachna (mother)
- Dynasty: Shor

Religious life
- Religion: Judaism
- Main work: Tevu'ot Shor
- Dynasty: Shor

Ephraim Zalman Shor (Hebrew: אפרים זלמן שור; c. 1550 – 2 October 1633) was a 16th-century Czech rabbi who is best known for his rabbinic work on kashrut and the proper ritual slaughter of animals called Tevu'ot Shor.

== Biography ==
Ephraim Shor was born c. 1550 in Pošná, Kingdom of Bohemia. His father Rabbi Naftali Zvi Hirsch Shor claimed to be a paternal descendant of Joseph ben Isaac Bekhor Shor, and a maternal descendant of Rashi. His mother Rivka Shachna was the daughter of Shalom Shachna. In his early years Ephraim learnt Halakah under the supervision of his father. He married Hanna Wahl Katzenallenbogen who was the daughter of the alleged "1 day King of Poland", Rabbi Saul Wahl Katzenellenbogen. In his mid thirties Ephraim moved to Lublin where he acted as the cities Chief Rabbi. Around 1600 he wrote his magnum opus Tevu'ot Shor which dealt with laws of kashrut and the proper halakhic ritual slaughter of animals. Ephraim died on 2 October 1663 in Lublin, and was buried in Lviv, Ukraine. His descendants would go on to occupy several prominent roles in Eastern European Jewry.
