= Shor =

Shor may refer to:

== Peoples and languages ==
- Shor language, one of the Turkic languages
- Shors, an indigenous ethnic group of southern Siberia

== People with the name ==
- Avraham Hayim Shor (died 1632), Eastern European rabbi and Talmud commentator
- Charles Shor (born 1954), American businessman
- Dan Shor (born 1956), American actor, director and writer
- David Shor (born 1991), American data scientist and political consultant
- Ephraim Zalman Shor (1551–1633), Czech rabbi
- Ilan Shor (born 1987), Moldovan hideaway businessman and politician
- Ira Shor (born 1945), American philosopher and academic
- Joseph ben Isaac Bekhor Shor (12th century), French poet
- Naum Z. Shor (1937–2006), Ukrainian mathematician
- Peter Shor (born 1959), American mathematician and academic
- Sol Shor (1913–1985), American screenwriter
- Toots Shor (1903–1977), American restaurateur

== Films ==
- Shor (film), a 1972 Hindi film
- Shor and Shorshor, a 1926 Soviet film

== Other uses ==
- Shor's algorithm, a quantum algorithm for integer factorization
- Toots Shor's Restaurant, New York City

== See also ==
- Schor, Schore, Schoor/van Schoor, Schorr, Shor, Shore, Shorr, Schur, Schure, Schürer/Schuerer/Schürrer, Schurr, Shur, Shure, Shurer
