= Aaron of Pesaro =

16th-century Italian Talmudist

Aaron of Pesaro was an Italian Talmudist who flourished in the sixteenth century at Pesaro, Italy. He wrote "Toledot Aharon" (The Generations of Aaron), an index to Scriptural quotations in the Talmud, arranged in the order of the Bible. This was first printed at Freiburg in 1583, and, in an abbreviated form, is found in rabbinic Bibles. His works influenced Aaron ben Samuel.
