= Aaron ben Samuel Schor =

17th-century Jewish-German rabbi and Hebrew author

Personal life
- Born: Aaron Jekel Schor; 1620 Lipník nad Bečvou, Moravia
- Died: 1701 (aged 80–81) Frankfurt (Oder), Germany
- Spouse: Suessele Horowitz
- Children: Abraham Selig Schor and Eliezer Schor
- Parent: Samuel Schor (father)
- Dynasty: Schor

Religious life
- Religion: Judaism

Jewish leader
- Main work: Beis Aharon
- Dynasty: Schor

Aaron Jekel ben Samuel Schor of Frankfurt (Hebrew: אהרון יקל בן שמואל שור מפרנקפורט; c. 1620 – 1701) also known as the Beis Aharon of Frankfurt was a 17th-century Jewish-German rabbi and Hebrew author, best known for his work "Beis Aharon", which is considered to be amongst the most important concordances of the Bible.

== Biography ==
Aaron Jekel Schor was born around 1620 in Lipník nad Bečvou, Moravia, where his father Samuel Schor (1590–1663) was serving as the town's rabbi. His family held a tradition of paternal descent from the medieval Tosafist, Joseph Bekhor Schor. In his early years, Aaron moved to Frankfurt an der Oder, where he married Suessele Horowitz (d. 1688) who was a great-granddaughter of Yom-Tov Lipmann Heller. Aaron was known to have published three other works, which are no longer extant and are only known, because of a passing remark in the introduction of Beis Aharon. Those works are: Sissera Torah – a midrashic commentary on Judges, Ḥibbur Masora – a midrashic commentary on the Masora, of which he gives several specimens, and Shaloaḥ Manot – a short commentary on the treatise Megillah. Aaron published Beis Aharon at Frankfurt an der Oder in 1690, being at that time of advanced age. In the introduction, he states that he spent ten long years writing the work, with the help of several other scholars who lived with him for this purpose. Beis Aharon was received with the approval of the greatest rabbinic authorities of the time, fifteen of whom give their approbation which prefaces the introduction of the work. The work is organized in the order of the Bible verse by verse, comprehensively citing usage of verses in the Babylonian and Jerusalem Talmuds, Midrashim, the Zohar and many other religious-philosophical, homiletic, and kabbalistic writings. The work finally concludes with a lengthy discussion on aspects of the Masorah. The work was published again in the 1780 Vilna and Grodno edition of the Nevi'im and Ketuvim. An enlarged edition by Abraham David Lavat appeared under the title "Beis Aharon ve-Hosafot" in 1880. At the request of his wife, Aaron translated into Yiddish the Midrash Petirat Moshe, published in 1693 in Frankfurt on der Oder. This work seemed to be popular among women in Poland and Russia. Aaron also wrote a commentary on Perek Shirah which appeared as an appendix to the 1701 Berlin prayer book. Aaron died in 1701 in Frankfurt an der Oder. His eldest son Abraham Selig Schor (1640–1712) served as the Av Bet Din of Frankfurt an der Oder and his second son Eliezer Schor (1645–1716), was the rosh yeshivah of the Frankfurt an der Oder yeshivah.
