= Saadia Bekhor Shor =

12th century rabbinic scholar and poet

- רבי סעדיה בן יוסוף בכור-שור
- Born: Orléans, France
- Occupations: Tosafist
- Relatives: Joseph ben Isaac Bekhor Shor (father); Abraham ben Joseph of Orleans (brother)

Rabbi Saadia ben Joseph Bekhor Shor (Hebrew: רבי סעדיה בן יוסוף בכור-שור) was a 12th century rabbinic scholar and poet, the son of Joseph Bekhor Shor and the brother of Abraham ben Joseph of Orleans. Probably born in Orléans, France, he is the author of several Masoretic and kabbalistic poems which have been preserved in Shem Tov ben Abraham ibn Gaon's commentaries on his poem.
