= Isaac ben Todros =

Isaac ben Todros was a Spanish rabbi and Talmudist who lived toward the end of the thirteenth century.

He was the teacher of Shem Tov ibn Gaon and Nathan b. Judah, and the friend of Bahya ben Asher, who mentions him in his Pentateuch commentary. He is also mentioned by Mordechai ben Hillel (d. 1310); and was still living in 1305; as on July 26, 1305 he subscribed to Solomon ben Adret's excommunication against the study of metaphysics by anyone under the age of thirty. He was probably one of the rabbis of Barcelona. He wrote a commentary on the Machzor, and a halakhic commentary to the "Azharot" of Solomon ibn Gabirol.

He is probably not to be identified with the Todros ben Isaac of Gerona (Brüll) who is praised by Kalonymus ben Kalonymus (1323) at the end of his "Even Bohan," and who wrote novellae on Nazir.
