= SN 1999by =

1999 Type Ia supernova event in the constellation Ursa Major

- Event type: Supernova
- Iap
- Date: April 30, 1999
- Constellation: Ursa Major
- Right ascension: 09^{h} 21^{m} 52.07^{s}
- Declination: +51° 00′ 06.6″
- Epoch: J2000
- Redshift: 0.0038
- Host: NGC 2841
- Notable features: Peculiar spectrum
- Peak apparent magnitude: 13.10±0.05

SN 1999by was a peculiar Type Ia supernova event in the spiral galaxy NGC 2841, located in the northern constellation of Ursa Major. It was one of the most subluminous supernovae of this type ever observed.

== Observations ==
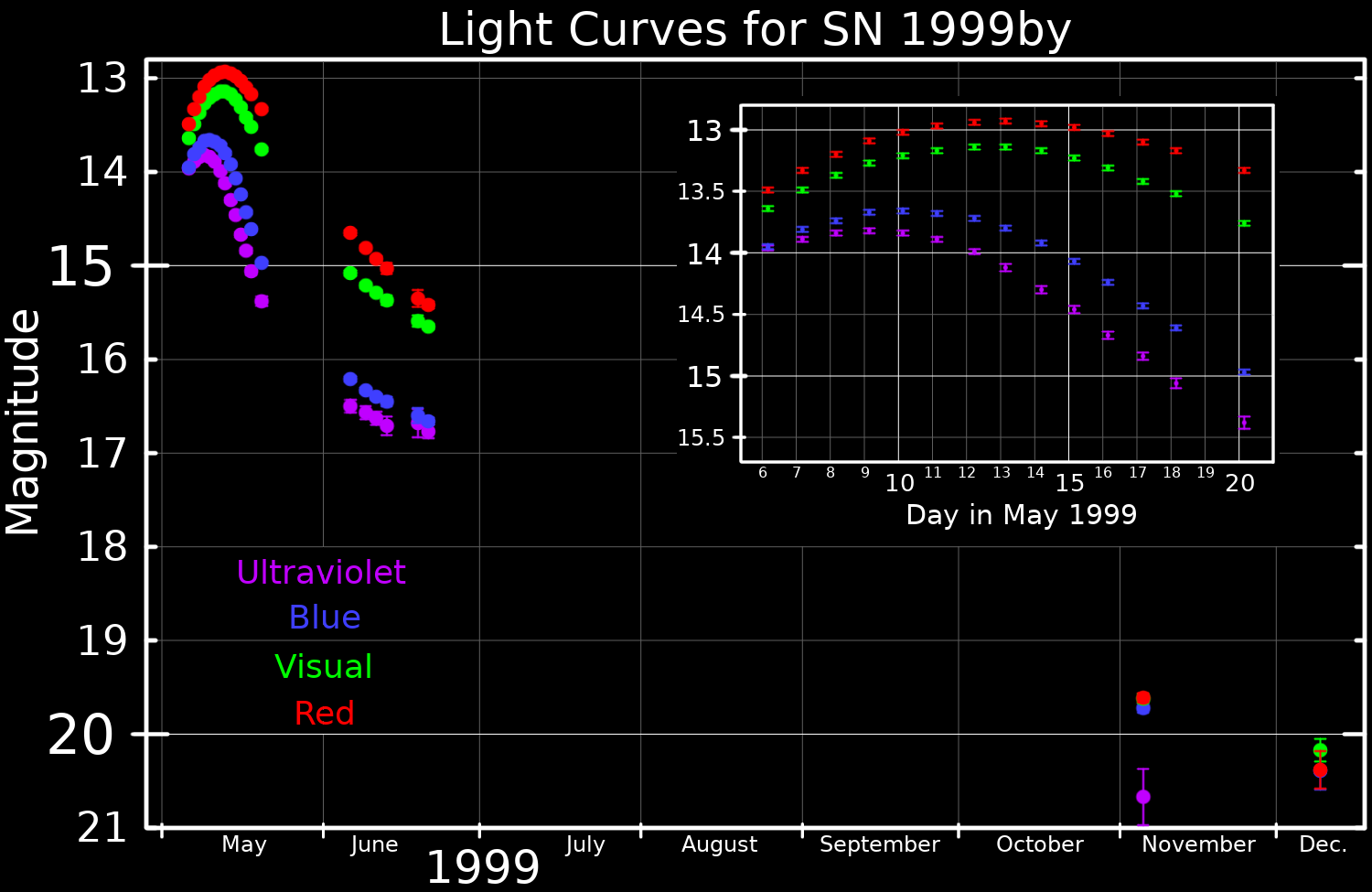
Light curves for SN 1999by in four photometric bands, plotted from data published by Garnavich et al.. The inset plot shows the time around peak brightness with an expanded scale.

This supernova was independently reported by R. Arbour of South Wonston, England, and by the Lick Observatory Supernova Search team. It was discovered on CCD images taken April 30, 1999. Located in the flocculent spiral galaxy NGC 2841, which had hosted three previous supernova events, it was positioned 91″ North and 100″ West of the Galactic Center. SN 1999by was identified as a Type Ia supernova on May 2, but the peculiar spectrum suggested it was subluminous. It achieved maximum light on May 11, reaching an apparent visual magnitude of 13.10±0.05.

Based on the distance to this galaxy, the peak absolute magnitude of this supernova was −17.12 (V), which is underluminous by about 2.5 magnitudes compared to a typical Type Ia supernova. It also showed a more rapid decline in brightness, one of the steepest declines observed. Polarization measurements showed evidence for intrinsic polarization, the first such finding for a subluminous Type Ia supernova. Geometrically, this indicated that the supernova had an axis of symmetry, which can be modeled by asphericity of about 20% seen along the equator. There are several possible explanations for this, including rapid rotation of the progenitor white dwarf, or the merger of two degenerate white dwarfs.
