= Shem Tov ben Abraham ibn Gaon =

Spanish Talmudist and kabbalist

Shem Tov ben Abraham ibn Gaon (Hebrew: שם טוב בן אברהם אבן גאון; 1283 – c. 1330) was a Spanish Talmudist and kabbalist.

== Biography ==
Shem Tov was born at Soria, Spain. From his genealogy given in the preface to his Keter Shem Tov, Azulai concluded that "Gaon" must have been the proper name of one of Shem Tov's ancestors. Zunz and Geiger however, suppose "Gaon" to be the Hebrew transliteration of "Jaén", indicating that Shem Tov's family originally came from that Spanish city.

After he had studied Talmud under Solomon ben Adret and kabbalah under Isaac ben Todros (RIBaT, which is the abbreviation of "R. Joseph b. Tobiah" according to David Conforte), Shem Tov moved to the Land of Israel in the hope of finding in the Holy Land a more suitable place for kabbalistic meditation. He lived for some time in Jerusalem and then settled at Safed.

== Works ==
At Safed Shem Tov wrote the following works, of which only the first two have been published:

- Migdal Oz, a commentary on Maimonides' Mishneh Torah; in this he defends Maimonides against the strictures of Abraham ben David. The part covering the first volume of Mishneh Torah was printed with the text at Constantinople in 1509; and parts of other volumes, also with the text, at Venice in 1524. Certain rabbis, Gedaliah ibn Yahya among them, ascribe the Migdal Oz to Ritva.
- Keter Shem Tov, a supercommentary on and continuation of Nahmanides' commentary to the Pentateuch (particularly its kabbalistic part); Shem Tov's interpretations differ from those of Nahmanides in many places. Shem Tov says in his preface that at first he had entitled his work "Sitrei Setarim", and that he then revised it and gave it the title "Keter Shem Tov", the work having been completed at Safed in 1315. Isaac ben Samuel of Acre (in his Meirat Einayim) violently attacks Keter Shem Tov, saying that most of the author's theories are not those of the older kabbalists, but are simply his own inventions. Keter Shem Tov is printed at the end of Judah Koriat's Ma'or va-Shemesh, where it is entitled Perush Sodot haTorah; and the preface has been published in Jehiel Ashkenazi's Heichal Adonai under the title Perush Likkutim.
- Badei haAron uMigdal Hananel, a kabbalistic work in five parts, finished in the month of Iyyar, 1325, and named by Shem Tov after his traveling companion, Hananel' b. Azkara, who died before reaching his destination.
- A supercommentary on Meir Abulafia's Ginnat Bitan, a kabbalistic commentary on Genesis.
- A commentary on Saadia Bekor Shor's kabbalistic poem, which he quotes in his Badei haAron.
- Sefer haPe'er, a kabbalistic treatise on tefillin. De Rossi declares the author's name to be doubtful, since the manuscript is anonymous; but Assemani concludes that its author was Shem Tov of Soria.
- Zivchei Tzedek and Rosh haShalishim, mentioned in Badei haAron, while in Keter Shem Tov the author speaks in general terms of his "other works."

In a manuscript containing piyyutim of various liturgists, there is one written by a Shem Tov b. Abraham, whom L. Dukes supposes to be identical with the subject of this article. But Dukes seems to have distinguished between Shem Tov b. Abraham and Shem Tov of Soria, the author of the Sefer ha-Pe'er. On the other hand, Conforte confusing Shem Tov b. Abraham with Shem Tov Ardotial, wrongly ascribes to the former the viddui recited on Yom Kippur in the Musaf prayer.

The following works are erroneously attributed to Shem Tov b. Abraham ibn Gaon by Wolf and by other bibliographers: Keter Shem Tov (Venice, 1601), a collection of sermons, and Ma'amar Mordekai (Constantinople, 1585), a commentary on Book of Esther, the author of both works being Shem Tov Melammed; also a kabbalistic treatise by an unknown author on the crowns ("taggin") of the letters.
