= NGC 2841 =

Galaxy in the constellation Ursa Major

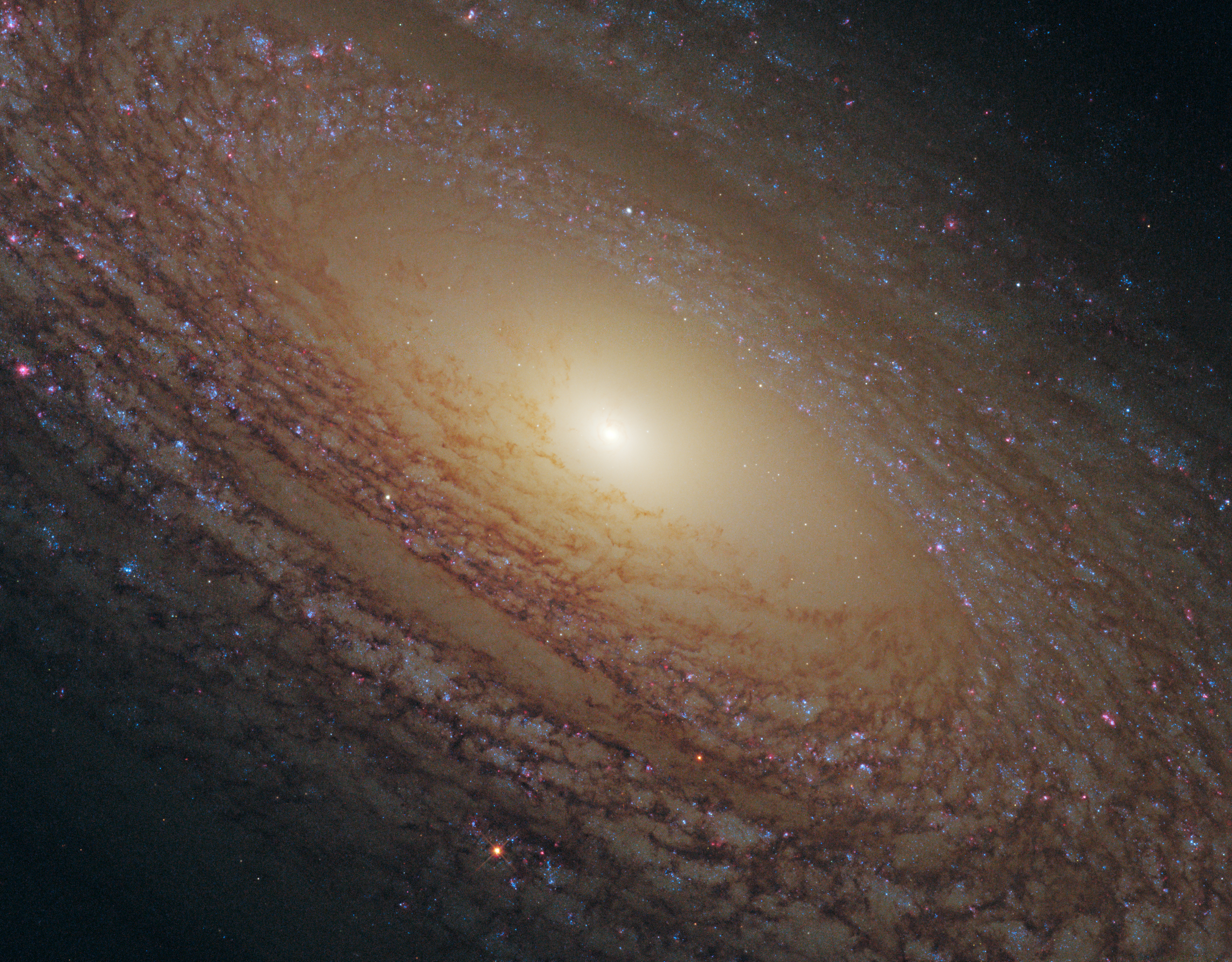
- NGC 2841 imaged by the Hubble Space Telescope

Observation data (J2000 epoch)
- Constellation: Ursa Major
- Right ascension: 09^{h} 22^{m} 02.655^{s}
- Declination: +50° 58′ 35.32″
- Redshift: 0.002130
- Heliocentric radial velocity: 638 km/s
- Distance: 46.0 ± 4.9 Mly (14.1 ± 1.5 Mpc)
- Apparent magnitude (V): 9.3

Characteristics
- Type: SAa
- Mass: 7×10^{10} M_{☉} M_{☉}
- Size: ~150,000 ly (~46 kpc)
- Apparent size (V): 8.1′ × 3.5′
- Notable features: Flocculent galaxy with LINER nucleus

Other designations
- IRAS 09185+5111, UGC 4966, MCG +09-16-005, PGC 26512, CGCG 265-006

NGC 2841, also known as the Tiger's Eye or Tiger's Eye Galaxy, is an unbarred spiral galaxy in the northern circumpolar constellation of Ursa Major. It was discovered on 9 March 1788 by German-born astronomer William Herschel. J. L. E. Dreyer, the author of the New General Catalogue, described it as, "very bright, large, very much extended 151°, very suddenly much brighter middle equal to 10th magnitude star". Initially thought to be about 30 million light-years distant, a 2001 Hubble Space Telescope survey of the galaxy's Cepheid variables determined its distance to be approximately 14.1 megaparsecs, or 46 million light-years. The optical size of the galaxy is 8.1′ × 3.5′.

This is the prototype for the flocculent spiral galaxy, a type of spiral galaxy whose arms are patchy and discontinuous. The morphological class is SAa, indicating a spiral galaxy with no central bar and very tightly-wound arms. There is no grand design structure visible in the optical band, although some inner spiral arms can be seen in the near infrared. It is inclined by an angle of 68° to the line of sight from the Earth, with the major axis aligned along a position angle of 148°.

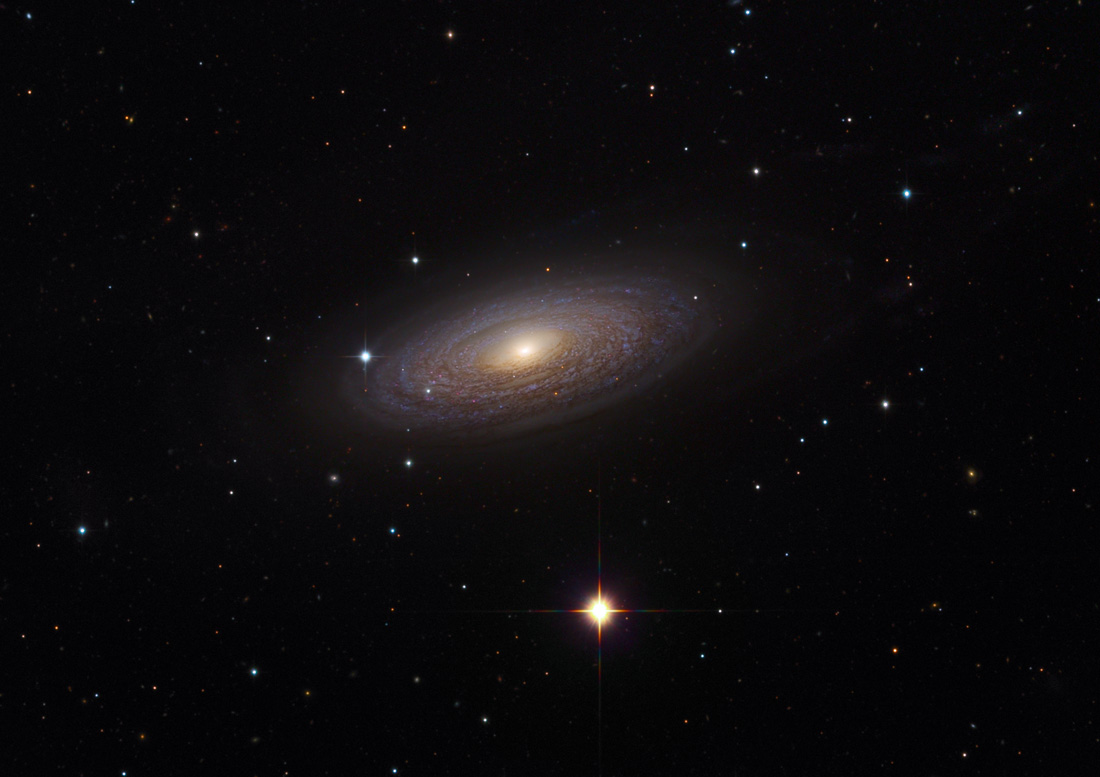
Wide field view of the galaxy

The properties of NGC 2841 are similar to those of the Andromeda Galaxy. It is home to a large population of young blue stars, and a few H II regions. The luminosity of the galaxy is 2×10^{10} L_{☉} and it has a combined mass of 7×10^{10} M_{☉}. Its disk of stars can be traced out to a radius of around 228 kly (70 kpc). This disk begins to warp at a radius of around 98 kly (30 kpc), suggesting the perturbing effect of in-falling matter from the surrounding medium.

The rotational behavior of the galaxy suggests there is a massive nuclear bulge, with a low-ionization nuclear emission-line region (LINER) at the core; a type of region that is characterized by spectral line emission from weakly ionized atoms. A prominent molecular ring is orbiting at a radius of 7–20 kly (2–6 kpc), which is providing a star-forming region of gas and dust. The nucleus appears decoupled and there is a counter-rotating element of stars and gas in the outer parts of the nucleus, suggesting a recent interaction with a smaller galaxy.

== Supernovae ==
Four supernovae have been observed in NGC 2841.

- SN 1912A (Type Ia, mag. 13) was discovered by Heber Curtis and Francis Pease on 19 February 1912.
- SN 1957A (Type Ia-pec, mag. 14) was discovered by Max Schürer on 1 March 1957. (Note: Some sources incorrectly list the discovery date as 26 February 1957.)
- SN 1972R (type unknown, mag. 16) was discovered by Paul Wild on 5 December 1972.
- SN 1999by (Type Ia-pec, mag. 15) was codiscovered by Ron Arbour, and the Lick Observatory Supernova Search, on 30 April 1999.

== See also ==
- List of NGC objects (2001–3000)
