= Mira Schor =

American artist, writer, editor and educator

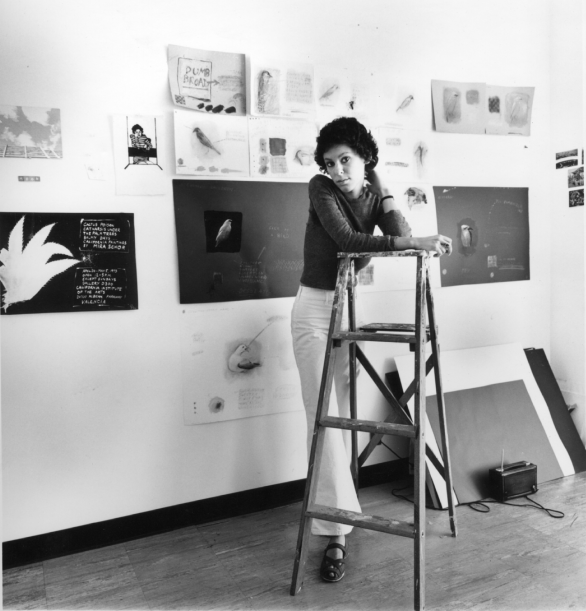
- Born: June 1, 1950 (age 76); New York City
- Occupations: Artist, writer, editor, educator, academic, theorist

Mira Schor (born June 1, 1950) is an American artist, writer, editor, and educator, known for her contributions to critical discourse on the status of painting in contemporary art and culture as well as to feminist art history and criticism.

== Early life and education ==
Mira Schor's parents Ilya and Resia Schor were Polish Jewish artists who came to the United States in 1941. Mira Schor and her older sister Naomi Schor (1943–2001), a noted scholar of French Literature and Feminist theory, were both educated at the Lycée Français de New York. After receiving her Baccalauréat in 1967, Mira Schor studied art history at New York University (WSC B.A. 1970). During this time she worked as an assistant to Red Grooms and Mimi Gross. She attended the California Institute of the Arts (CalArts) from 1972-1973, receiving a Master of Fine Arts degree in Painting from in 1973. There she was a participant in the CalArts Feminist Art Program’s renowned project Womanhouse (1972). In the Feminist Art Program she studied with Miriam Shapiro and Judy Chicago. Later at CalArts she studied with Los Angeles-born sculptor Stephan Von Huene.

== Career ==
=== Painting ===
Schor’s visual work balances political and theoretical concerns with formalist and material passions. Her work has included major periods in which gendered narrative and representation of the body has been featured, but the predominant focus of her work has been representation of language in drawing and painting. Her paintings have been foregrounded by these various disciplines: by painting, with shows such as "Slow Art: Painting in New York Now," at P.S.1 Contemporary Art Center; by feminism, with exhibitions such as "Sexual Politics: Judy Chicago's 'Dinner Party' in Feminist Art History," at the Armand Hammer Museum; and by language, with shows such as "Poetry Plastique," at Marianne Boesky Gallery in New York. In 1969, Yvonne Jacquette lent her a book of Rajput painting and poetry, which she claimed had a "huge, huge influence" on her.

In the 1980s and 90s, Schor's work was also exhibited in New York at the Edward Thorp Gallery, Horodner Romley Gallery, and in group exhibitions including at the Santa Monica Museum, the Armand Hammer Museum, The Neuberger Museum, and the Aldrich Museum. Her visual work and her writings are included in Art and Feminism (2001) and Sexual Politics: Judy Chicago’s Dinner Party in Feminist Art History (1996). In 2009 Schor exhibited her work at Momenta Art in Williamsburg, Brooklyn, in a solo exhibition entitled "Suddenly," marking a departure in Schor's work, from the depiction of language as image to the suggestion of its lack in a space where we expect to see it. A solo exhibition, "Mira Schor: Paintings From the Nineties To Now," was held at CB1 Gallery in Los Angeles, CA (November 20, 2010 – January 9, 2011) with a catalogue essay by art historian Amelia Jones. Schor exhibited her work at Marvelli Gallery in 2012. In 2009 painter and critic Robert Berlind wrote, "An intimist whose candor is akin to Emily Dickinson’s.". In a 2012 New York Times review, critic Roberta Smith wrote "Mira Schor’s small, sharp, quirky paintings have been thorns in the side of the medium for more than three decades now" and "Ms. Schor hardly tells the whole story of creative labor, but she lays out its essential elements: the isolation, reading, thinking and percolation that enable a Voice to emerge. At once poetic, lyrical and oddly real, her paintings give rare and sardonic visual form to the life, and the work, of the mind". Reviews of Schor's recent exhibitions have been published in Art in America and on Artforum.com.

=== Editor ===
Schor is the co-founder and co-editor, with Susan Bee, of the art journal, M/E/A/N/I/N/G. M/E/A/N/I/N/G: An Anthology of Artists' Writings, Theory, and Criticism, was published by Duke University Press in 2000. The archive of the journal was acquired by the Beinecke Library at Yale University in 2007. This respected artist-run editorial project continues at M/E/A/N/I/NG Online

=== Writing and scholarship ===
Schor has written frequently on issues of gender representation, including "Backlash and Appropriation," a chapter of The Power of Feminist Art, 1994, an historical overview of the Feminist movement published by Abrams, "Patrilineage", 2002, republished in The Feminism and Visual Culture Reader edited by Amelia Jones, and on artists such as Ida Applebroog, Mary Kelly, and Ana Mendieta. Schor is the author of Wet: On Painting, Feminism, and Art Culture, 1997, and co-founder and co-editor, with Susan Bee, of M/E/A/N/I/N/G publishing 20 issues from 1986-1996. An online version of the journal, M/E/A/N/I/NG Online was launched in 2000 (the final issue, no. 7 was published in 2016). M/E/A/N/I/N/G An Anthology of Artists’ Writings, Theory, and Criticism, was published by Duke University Press in 2000. Schor has sometimes been criticized for taking an essentialist position in terms of feminism and many of her writings take on this debate. In her writings on paintings in essays such as "Figure/Ground," 2001, Schor is seen as making a case for the relevance of painting in a post-medium visual culture and for arguing for the compatibility and mutuality of painterly and theoretical practices.

In 2003, Schor produced a video documentary on her parents’ work, The Tale of the Goldsmith’s Floor, originally created for the 2003 Brown University and differences conference, "The Lure of the Detail"

Schor was awarded the Creative Capital / Warhol Foundation Arts Writers Grant to develop A Year of Positive Thinking, a blog on contemporary art in 2009.

In 2010, she delivered a lecture called "On Failure and Anonymity" for a collaborative project called #class at Winkleman Gallery in New York.

=== Teaching ===
She taught at NSCAD in Halifax, Nova Scotia (1974–1978), SUNY Purchase (1983–1985), Sarah Lawrence College (1991–1994), RISD (1999–2000), and was a resident artist at Skowhegan School in 1995. She has also taught in the Vermont College and MECA low-residency MFA programs as an artist/teacher, and at School of Visual Arts in the MFA in Art Criticism and Writing Program in 2006. For over a decade she has taught in the Fine Arts Department at Parsons The New School for Design.

== Selected works ==
=== Books ===
- A Decade of Negative Thinking: Essays on Art, Politics, and Daily Life, 2010
- The Extreme of the Middle: Writings of Jack Tworkov, Yale University Press, 2009.
- M/E/A/N/I/N/G: An Anthology of Artists' Writings, Theory, and Criticism, co-edited with Susan Bee, Duke University Press, 2000.
- Wet: On Painting, Feminism, and Art Culture, Duke University Press, 1997.

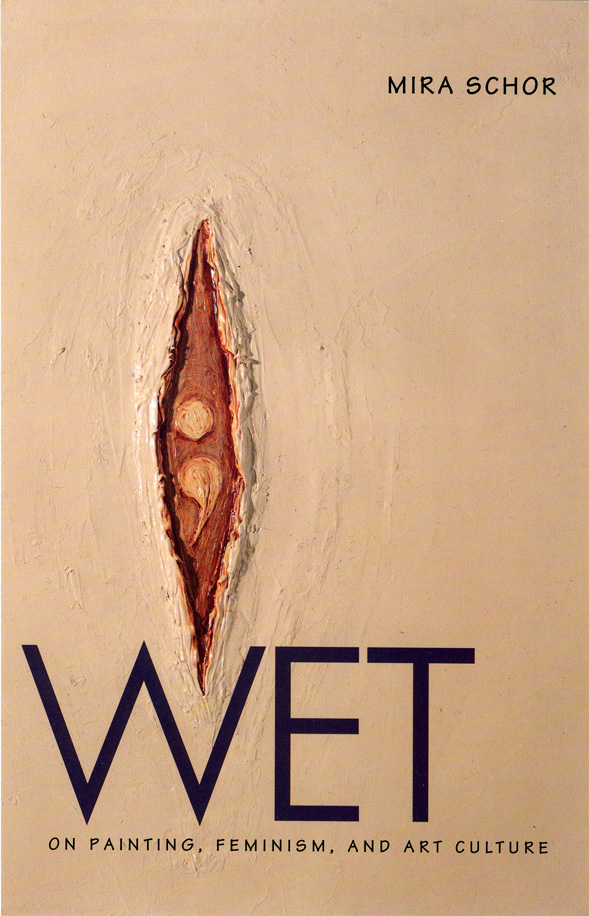
Cover for Wet: On Painting, Feminism, and Art Culture

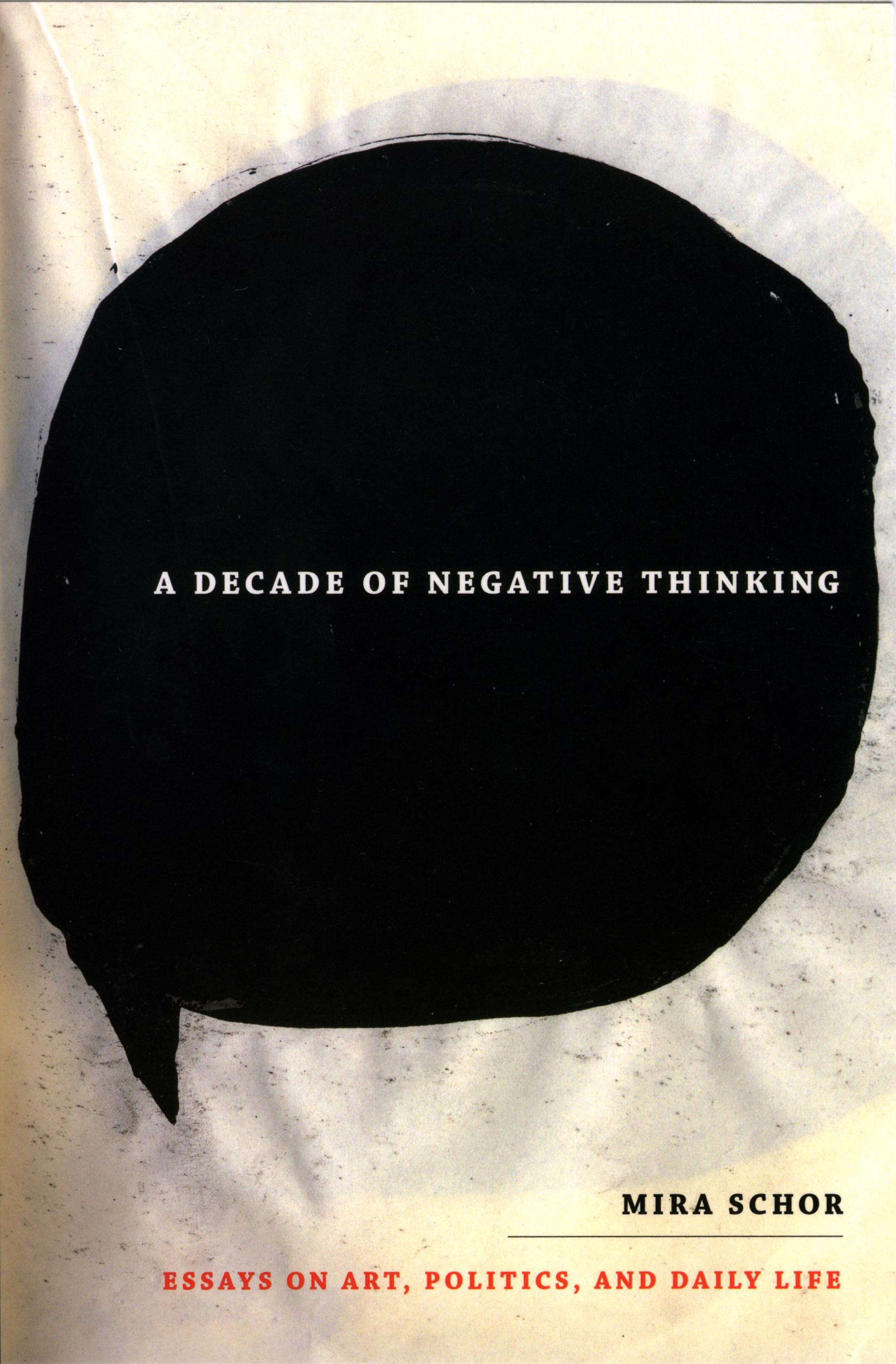
Cover for A Decade of Negative Thinking: Essays on Art, Politics, and Daily Life

=== Essays ===
- "I am not now nor have I ever been …", Brooklyn Rail, February 2008
- "She Demon Spawn from Hell". M/E/A/N/I/N/G Online. 2006.
- "Backlash and Appropriation" in The Power of Feminist Art, Norma Broude & Mary Garrard, eds, Abrams, 1994
- "Patrilineage," Feminist Art Criticism issue, Art Journal 50, No. 2 Summer 1991. Anthologized in New Feminist Criticism: Art/Identity/Action, HarperCollins, 1994 and The Feminism and Visual Culture Reader, Routledge, 2003; Translated into Czech, Neviditelná zena, Antologie soucasneho americkeko mysleni o feminismu, dejinach a vizualite, Martina Pachmanova, ed., One Woman Press, Prague, 2002.
- "Figure/Ground," M/E/A/N/I/N/G #6, reprinted in Wet & M/E/A/N/I/N/G: An Anthology, excerpted in Helen Reckitt & Peggy Phelan, Art and Feminism, London & New York: Phaidon Press Ltd., 2001.
- "Medusa Redux: Ida Applebroog and the Spaces of Postmodernity," Artforum, March. Updated and published as catalogue essay for Ida Applebroog, Orchard Gallery, Derry, Northern Ireland, 1993; excerpts included in Ida Applebroog, Are You Bleeding Yet?, New York: La Maison Red, 2002.
- "On Failure and Anonymity," Heresies 25, 1990.
- "Appropriated Sexuality," M/E/A/N/I/N/G #1, 1986. Anthologized in Theories of Contemporary Art, Richard Hertz, ed. (Prentice Hall, 1985), and republished in Wet and M/E/A/N/I/N/G: An Anthology of Artists' Writings, Theory, and Criticism.

== Grants and awards ==
- Creative Capital/Andy Warhol Foundation Arts Writers Grant, 2009.
- Residency at The Rockefeller Foundation’s Study and Center in Bellagio, Italy, 2001.
- College Art Association’s Frank Jewett Mather Award in Art Criticism, 1999.
- Pollock-Krasner Foundation Grant, 1997.
- Guggenheim Fellowship in Creative Arts, 1992.
- The Space Program of The Marie Walsh Sharpe Art Foundation, 1992.
- National Endowment for the Arts, Visual Arts Fellowship in Painting, 1985.
- Inducted as Academician, National Academy of Design, 2017.
- Women’s Caucus for Art Lifetime Achievement Award, 2019

== Gallery ==
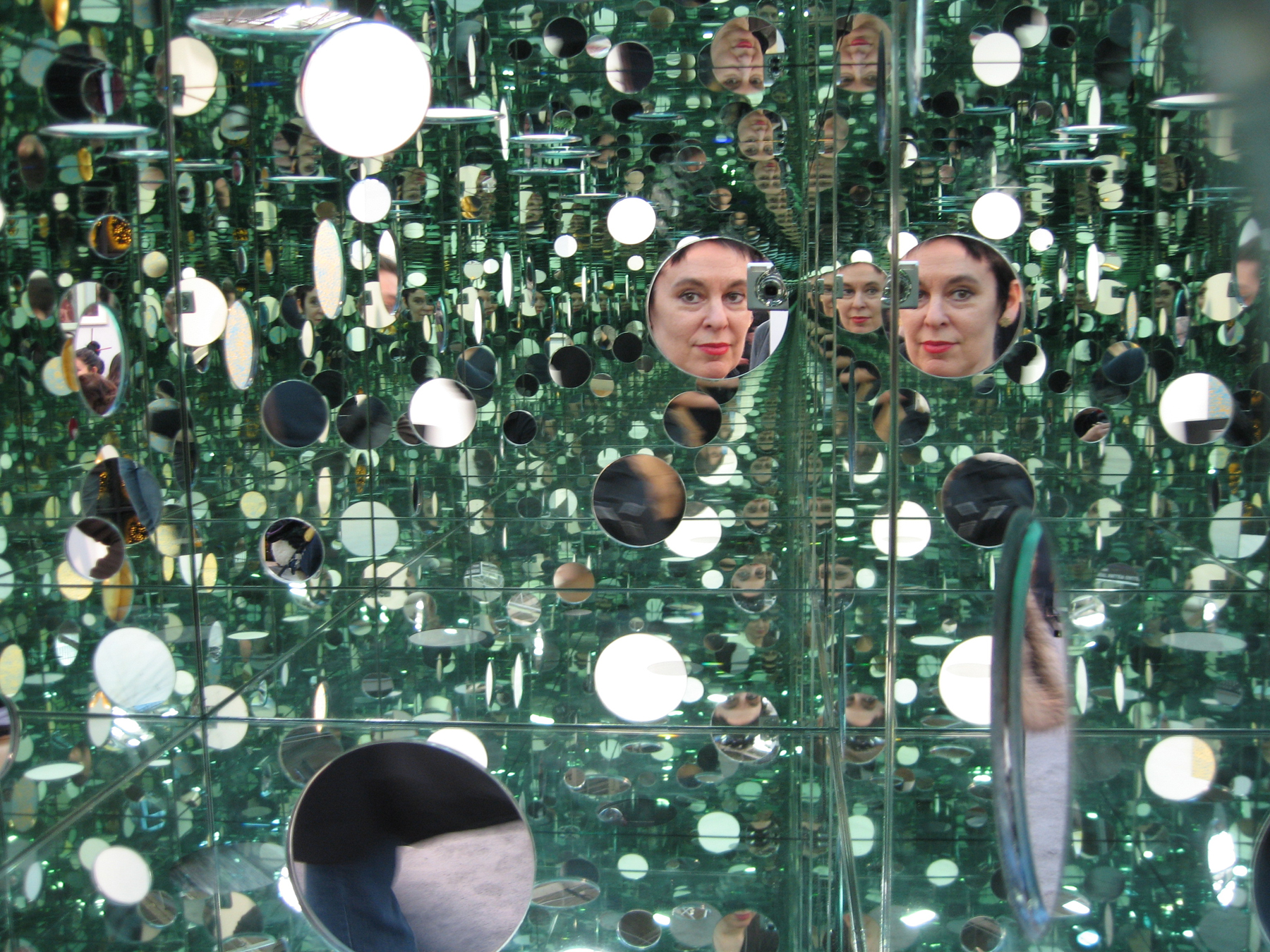
Mira Schor, 2007

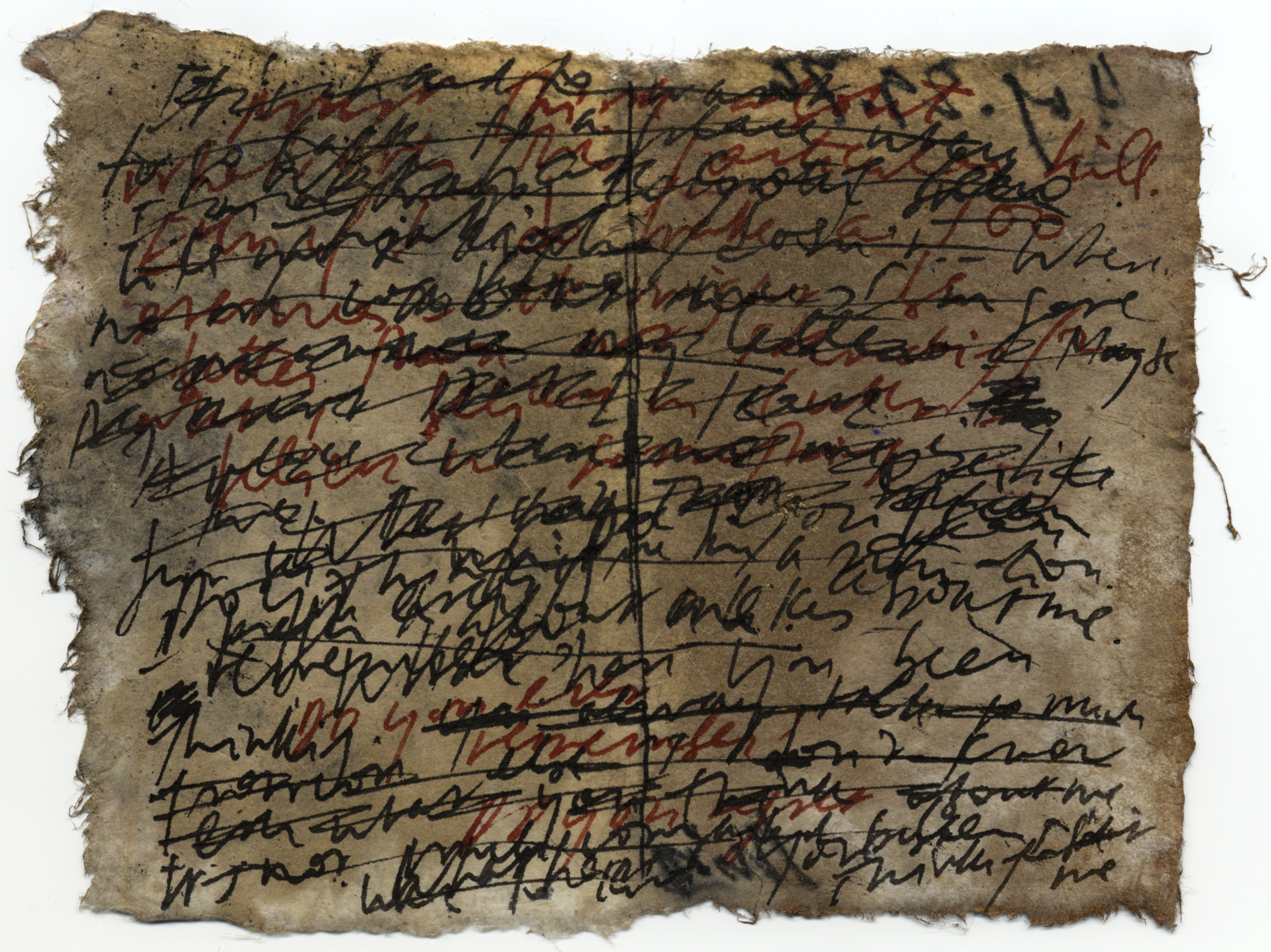
Mira Schor, Postcard: August 29, 1976. Front side, ink and media on rice paper, 6 3/4" × 5", 1976

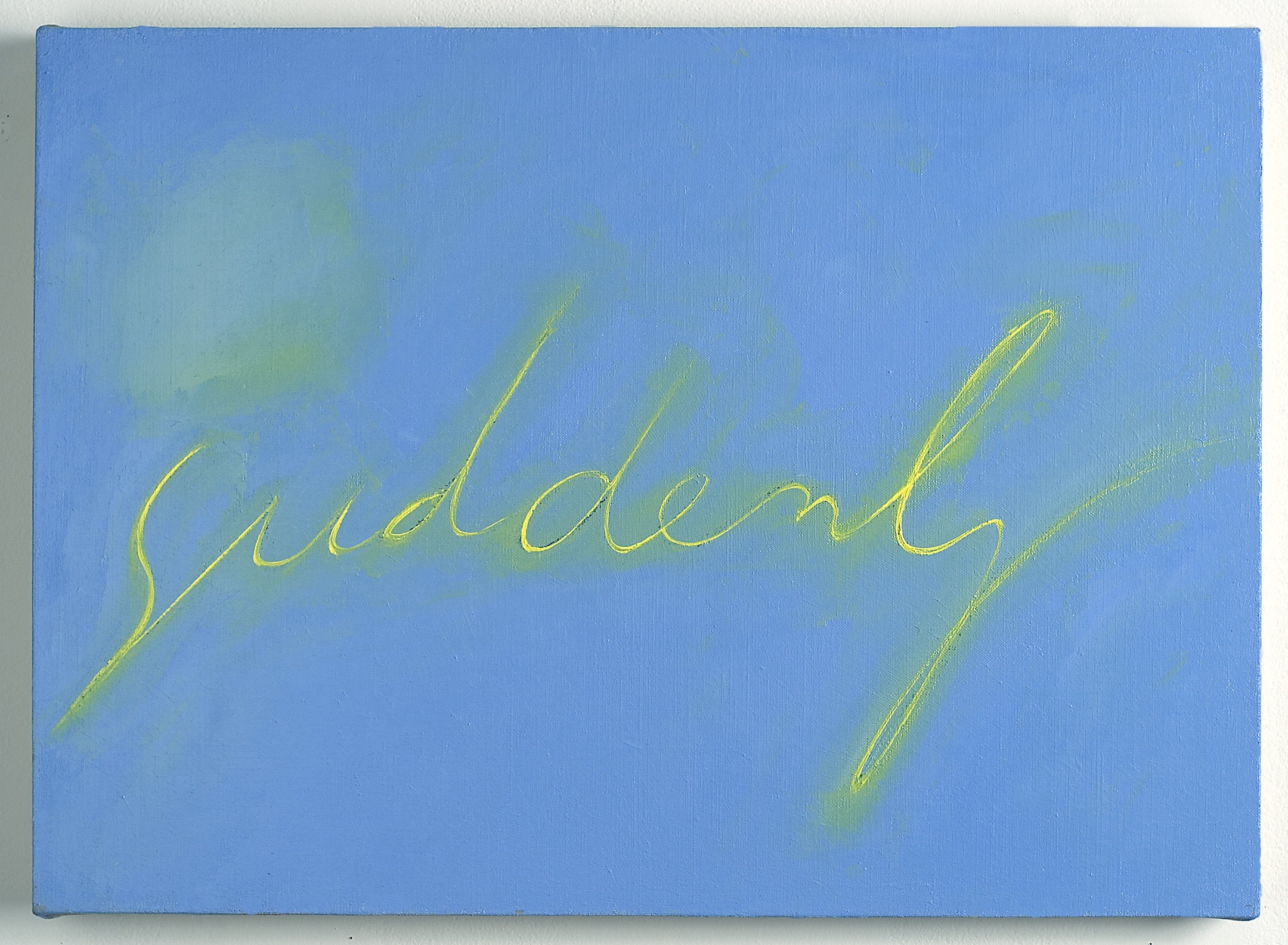
Mira Schor, Blue Suddenly, oil on linen, 18" × 25", 2005

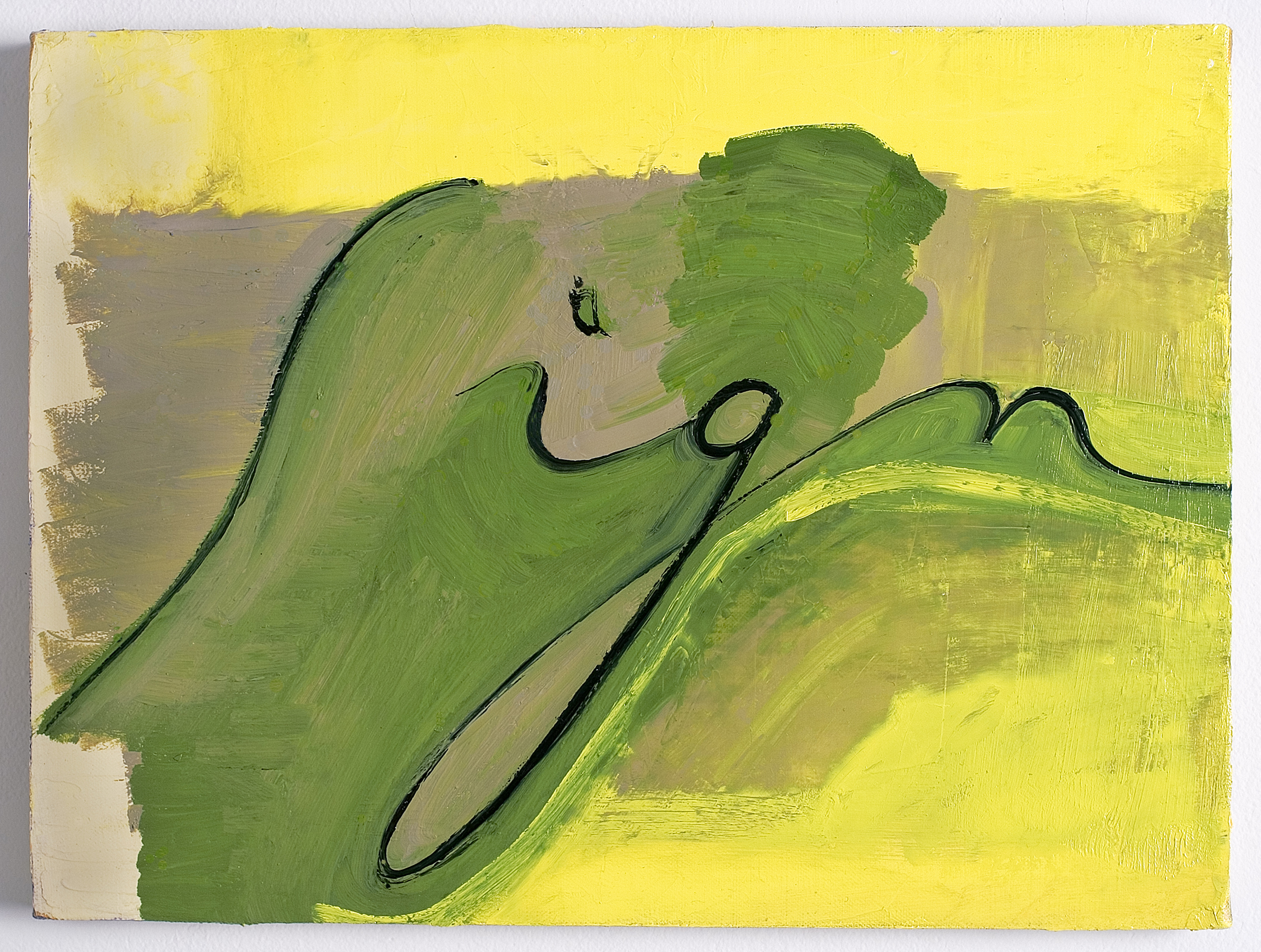
Mira Schor, Sign, oil on linen, 12" × 16", 2005

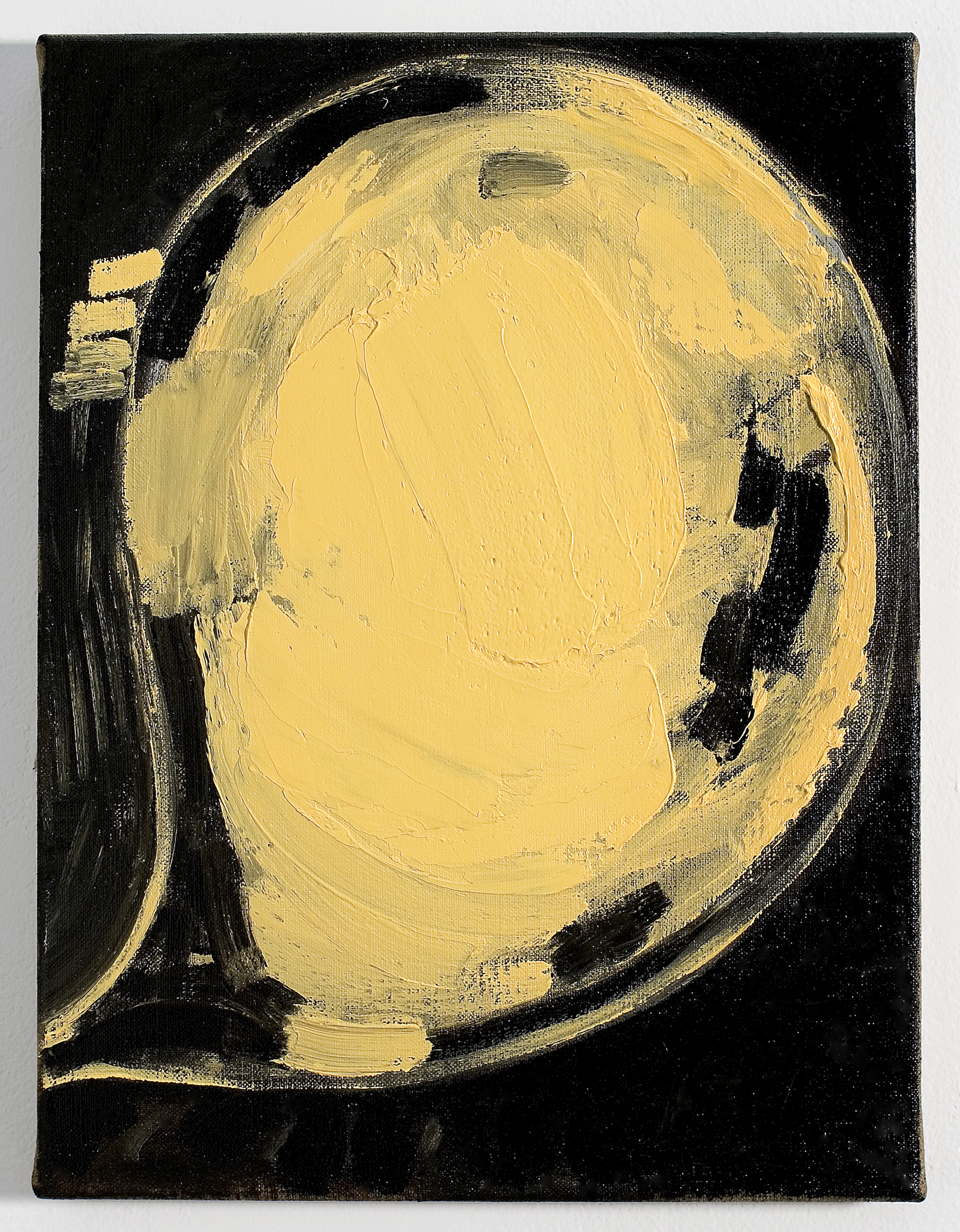
Mira Schor, Portrait of my Brain, oil on linen, 16" × 12", 2007

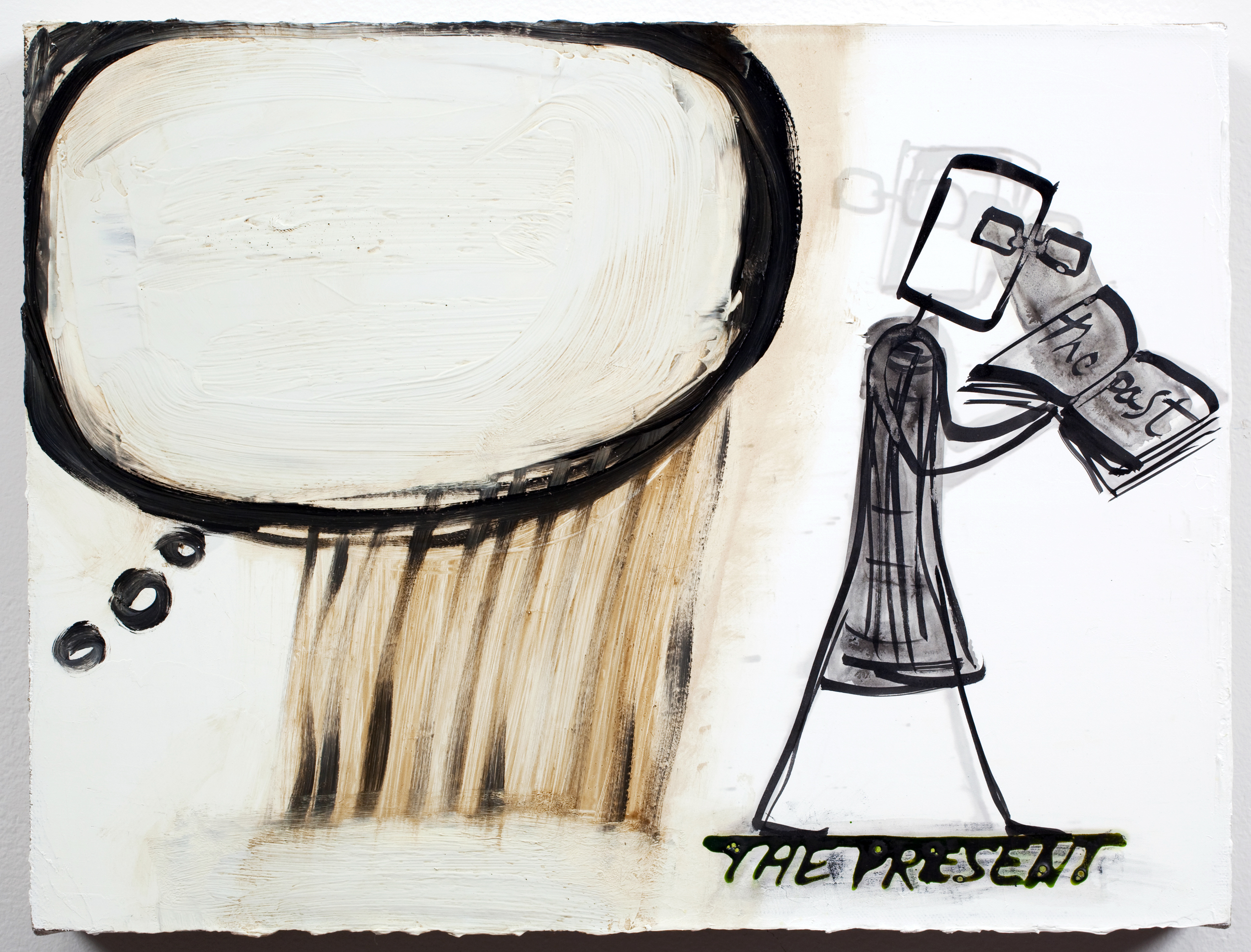
Mira Schor, Past, Present, And, oil and gesso on linen, 12" × 16", 2009
