= Resia Schor =

American painter (1910–2006)

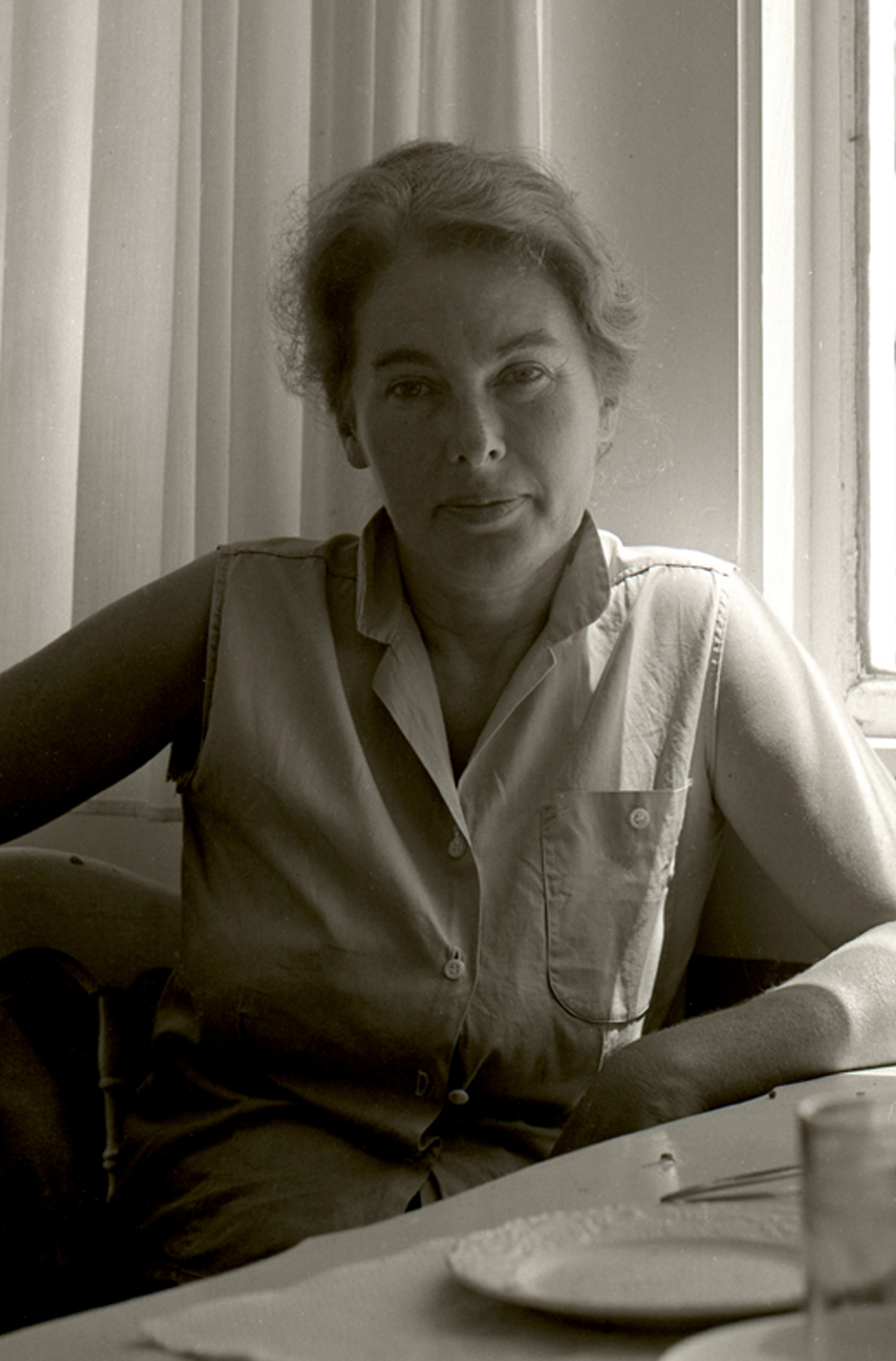
- Resia Schor, Provincetown, Summer, 1960 (Photo: Ryszard Horowitz)
- Born: December 5, 1910; Lublin, Poland
- Died: November 26, 2006 (aged 95); New York City

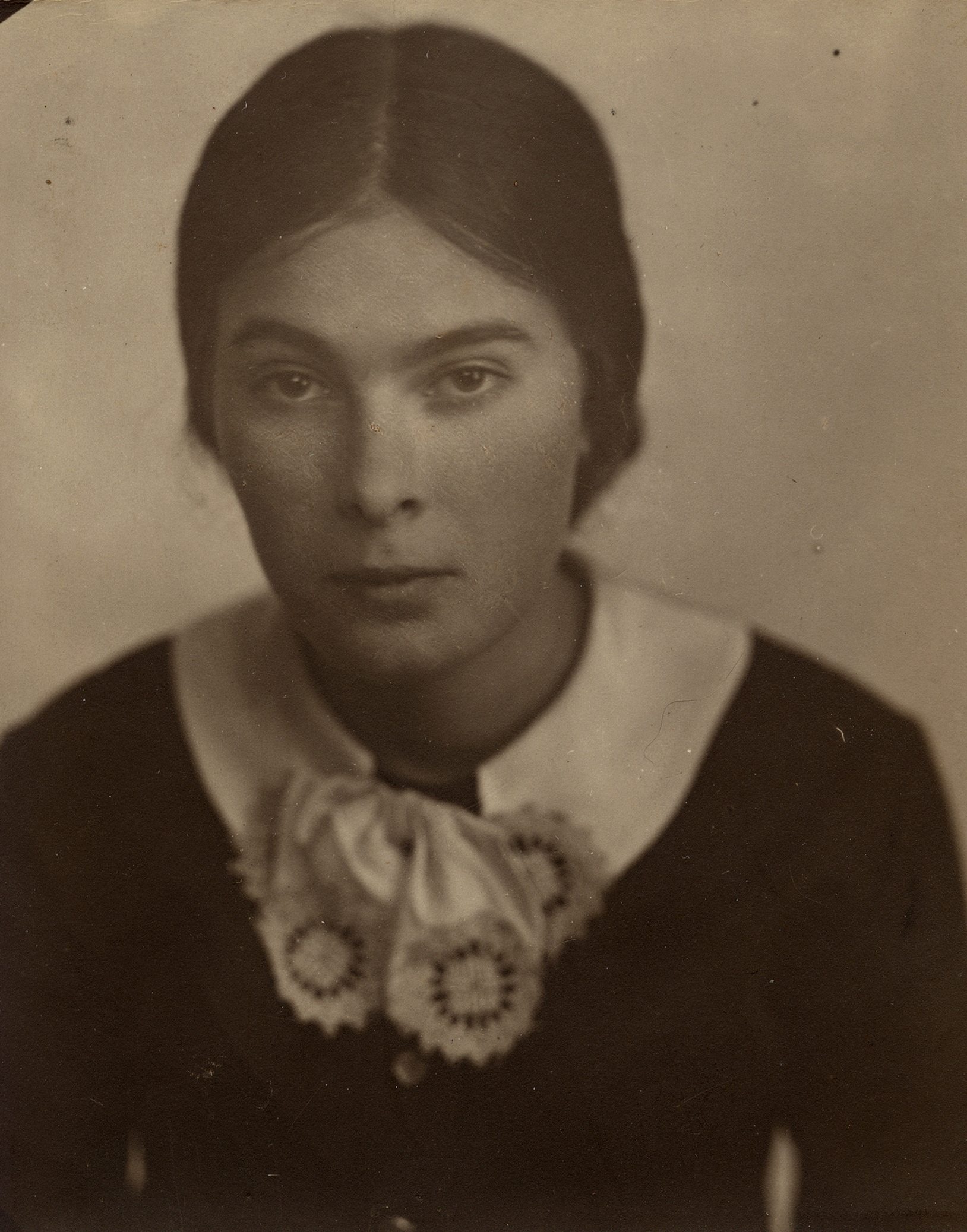
Resia Schor, c. 1928

Resia Schor (December 5, 1910, in Lublin, Congress Poland, Russian Empire – November 26, 2006, in New York City) was a Polish-born American artist who lived and worked in New York City from 1941 until her death in 2006.

== Early life ==
Resia Schor (née Ainstein) was born near Lublin, Poland in 1910. Her Jewish family, though from a traditionally observant background with ties to Hasidim, was rather urban and Polish, and her mother believed she had the right to pursue advanced studies in art despite her gender. She studied painting at the Academy of Fine Arts in Warsaw. There she met the painter and sculptor Ilya Schor; they lived in Paris and married there at the outbreak of the Second World War. On December 3, 1941, they came to the United States and settled in New York City. Both Schors’ extended families perished in the Holocaust. The Schors had two daughters born in New York City: artist and writer Mira Schor and scholar of French literature and feminist theory, Naomi Schor. Resia Schor exhibited her paintings in New York City in the 1950s under the name Resia Ain. She also studied silversmithing with her husband.

== Later work ==
After Ilya Schor's death in 1961, Resia Schor worked exclusively in metal, creating one of a kind jewelry and Judaica, as well as multimedia sculptures, all in a bold modernist abstract style with a painterly feel for color and texture.

The noted poet Richard Howard wrote of Schor's work: “

How everything is woven into the whole; Each in the other works and lives! [...] Speaking of the Macrocosm, we are reminded, indeed, that the Ancients used to represent the earth as the back of an immense turtle, all things that live and grow sending down their roots into the great participating shell which bears them into the empty air. That is what these recent pieces of Resia Schor suggest, and if in their articulation of process we can only call them abstract, then it is the abstraction of energy itself her pieces display, ‘the force that through the green fuse drives the flower.'

She exhibited her works in solo exhibitions at the Arras Gallery in New York City, The East End Gallery in Provincetown, MA, and The Benson Gallery in Bridgehampton, New York. In the 1980s and 1990s, her work was included in group exhibitions at the Provincetown Art Association and Museum (PAAM) and in the exhibition Family, at The Aldrich Contemporary Art Museum in Connecticut. In the late 1960s and the 1970s, her work was included in exhibitions including "The Women's Art Symposium," Turman Gallery, Indiana State University," Made in Metal," The Junior Art Gallery, Louisville, KY, "National Jewelry Exhibition by Outstanding Contemporary American Artist–Craftsmen," Lawrence University, Appleton, WI, "First Survey of Contemporary American Crafts," The University Art Museum, The University of Texas, Austin, and "Crafts Invitational," The Gallery of the Maryland Institute, Baltimore, MD.

In 1969, the musicians of the orchestra of the New York Philharmonic commissioned a mezuzah by Resia Schor as their farewell gift to Leonard Bernstein. An exhibition “Mezuzot by Resia Schor” was held at Yeshiva University Museum in New York City in 2000.Her work is held in the permanent collections of the Smithsonian American Art Museum and the Jewish Museum in New York.

=== Gallery ===
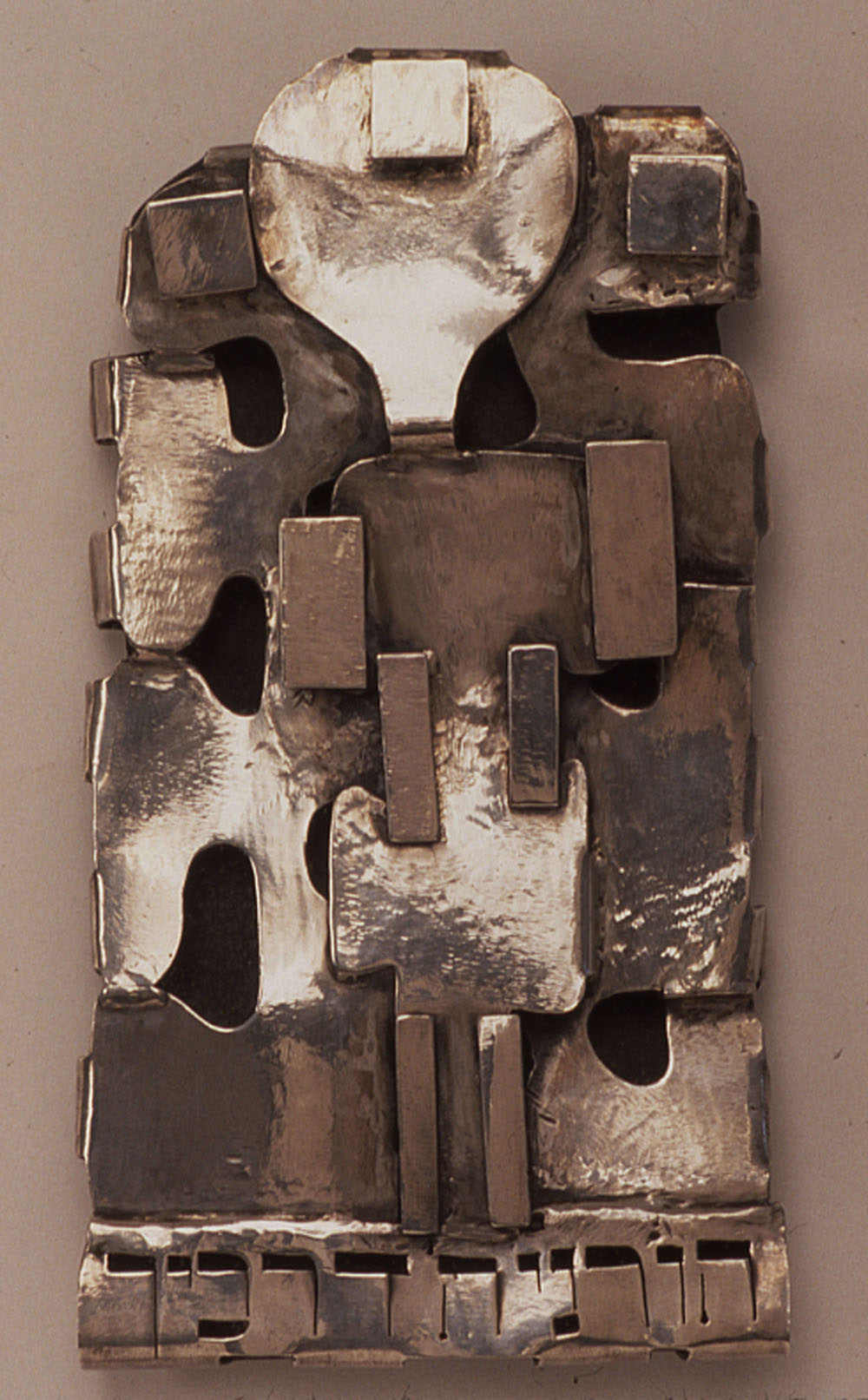
Resia Schor, Mezuzah: “Grant Peace, happiness and blessing,” silver, c. 8”x4”x2”, 1986

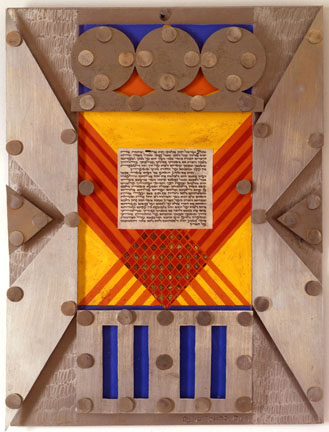
Resia Schor, Mezuzah, white metal, plexiglas, gouache on paper, 12 ”x 9”, 1983

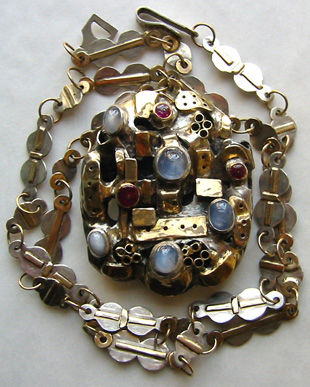
Resia Schor, Pendant, silver and gold with rubies, star sapphires, and moonstones, 1974

== Bibliography ==
- The Tale of The Goldsmith’s Floor, a 32-minute video originally created by Mira Schor for the 2003 Brown University and differences Conference, “The Lure of the Detail.” “The Tale of The Goldsmith’s Floor,” illustrated video script, differences, Volume 14, Number 3, Fall 2003, pp. 137–61.
- Rosenbaum, Belle, Upon Thy Doorposts, The Jacob and Belle Rosenbaum Foundation, New York, 1995.
- Karp, Abraham J., ed., The Jews in America: A Treasury of Art and Literature, Hugh Lauter Levin Associates, 1994.
- Faulkner, Ray and Zigfield, Edwin. Introduction to the Visual Arts, Art Today, 1965, 1969.
- Kanof, Abram. Jewish Ceremonial Art and Religious Observance, Harry N. Abrams, Inc., New York, 1969.
- Hammel, Lisa. "Carrying on an artist–jeweler's work," The New York Times, June 2, 1969, p. 50.
- Howard, Richard. "Jewelry by Resia Schor," Crafts Horizons, July/August, 1966.
- Dore Ashton, “Painting by Resia Ain,” New York Times, 1959.
