= Jersey Shore (disambiguation) =

Jersey Shore is the coastal area of New Jersey, United States.

Jersey Shore may also refer to:

- Jersey Shore (TV series), an American reality TV series
- Jersey Shore Boca, an American soccer team
- Jersey Shore, Pennsylvania, U.S., an inland borough
- Jersey Shore sound, a rock music genre
