= Ilya Schor =

Polish-American painter

- Ilya Schor, 1940s
- Born: April 16, 1904; Złoczów, Galicia, Austria-Hungary (now Zolochiv, Lviv Oblast)
- Died: June 7, 1961 (aged 57); New York City, New York, U.S.
- Known for: Painter, jeweler, engraver, sculptor

Ilya Schor (April 16, 1904 – June 7, 1961) was an artist, a painter, jeweler, engraver, sculptor, and renowned artist of Judaica.

== Early life ==
Ilya Schor was born in Złoczów (Galicia), in the Austrian Empire (now Zolochiv, Lviv Oblast, Ukraine) in 1904. He came from a deeply Hasidic family. His father, Naftali, was a folk-artist, painting colorfully illustrated store signs for local merchants. Schor first trained as an apprentice in metalcrafts and engraving before enrolling at the Warsaw Academy of Fine Arts in 1930 where he studied painting. In 1937, Ilya was awarded a grant by the Polish government to study in Paris. He exhibited successfully at the Salon d'Automne in 1938.

Ilya Schor and his artist wife, Resia, immigrated to the United States in December 1941, from Marseille, via Lisbon, after fleeing Paris in late May 1940. The couple had two daughters, born in New York City: artist and writer Mira Schor (b. 1950) and the late literary scholar and theorist, Naomi Schor (1943–2001).

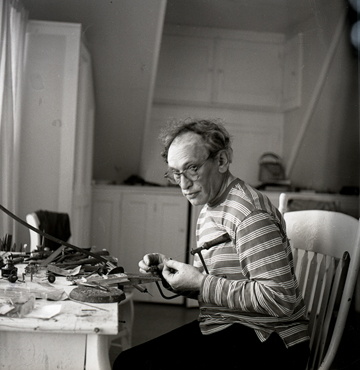
Ilya Schor, 1960, photo Ryszard Horowitz

== Later life and work ==
In New York City, Ilya Schor began artwork that would keep fresh his memories of life of the Jews of the shtetls of Eastern Europe, working in the many materials and with the numerous skills at his disposal. He worked on major commissions for synagogues in the United States. Schor’s wood-engraving illustrations for The Earth is The Lord’s and The Sabbath, both important writings by the renowned philosopher and theologian, Rabbi Abraham Joshua Heschel, and for Adventures of Mottel The Cantor’s Son by Sholem Aleichem, have remained in print for over fifty years.

Rabbi Heschel wrote of Schor’s work, “In the stillness of the precious images Ilya Schor has called into being, generations to come will hear the voice and the spirit of eternal Israel, the inwardness and piety of our people of Eastern Europe.” Schor was also the creator of unique jewelry and small Judaica objects in silver and gold. In later years he also worked on abstract sculptures in brass and copper.

His work was exhibited at The Salpeter Gallery in New York 1953, the Museum of Contemporary Art in Boston, and the Jewish Museum (New York) in 1948, and was included in group exhibitions such as Liturgical Art, Arts Club of Chicago and at the HCE Gallery, Provincetown, Massachusetts, in 1959 and 1960; Six American Sculptors, Milwaukee Arts Center; Art in Judaism – Past and Present, Newark Museum in 1957; Six American Sculptors, Arts Club of Chicago in 1956.

== Death ==
Ilya Schor died in New York City in 1961, aged 57. A retrospective of his work was held at the Jewish Museum (New York) in 1965. Another smaller exhibition of works in varied media, "Life of the Old Jewish Shtetl: Paintings and Silver by Ilya Schor", was held at Yeshiva University Museum in 1975.

His works are included in the collections of the Metropolitan Museum of Art, the Jewish Museum (New York), the Jerusalem Great Synagogue Jacob and Belle Rosenbaum Mezuzah Collection, North Carolina Museum of Art, and the Sydney Jewish Museum (Sydney, Australia).

== Gallery ==
Ilya Schor, Clown, brass, 6½" × 11¼", 1950s

Ilya Schor, Self-Portrait with Paintbrush, gouache on board, 8" × 10", 1940s

Ilya Schor, Chanukioth, detail, engraved and pierced silver, 1950s

Ilya Schor, The Presence of the Day, wood-engraving illustration to Abraham Joshua Heschel's The Sabbath: Its Meaning for Modern Man, 1951.

== Bibliography ==
- The Tale of The Goldsmith’s Floor, a 32-minute video originally created for the 2003 Brown University and differences Conference.
- The Lure of the Detail, The Tale of The Goldsmith’s Floor, illustrated video script, differences, Volume 14, Number 3, Fall 2003, pp. 137–61.
- Belle Rosenbaum, Upon Thy Doorposts, The Jacob and Belle Rosenbaum Foundation, New York, 1995.
- Abraham J. Karp, ed., The Jews in America: A Treasury of Art and Literature, Hugh Lauter Levin Associates, 1994.
- Dalia Tawil and Rhonda Jacobs, Life of the Old Jewish Shtetl; paintings and silver by Ilya Schor, November 1975-January 1976, exhibition catalogue, New York: Yeshiva University Museum.
- Abram Kanof, Jewish Ceremonial Art and Religious Observances, Harry N. Abrams, Inc., New York, 1969.
- Tom Freudenheim, Ilya Schor, exhibition catalogue, New York: The Jewish Museum, 1965.
- Alfred Werner, “Ilya Schor: A Versatile, Profound Artist,” The Jewish News, September 8, p. 13.
- Abraham Heschel, “Ilya Schor,” Conservative Judaism, Fall 1961.
- Ilya Schor, [Obituary], New York Times, June 8, 1961.
- “Fantasies in Silver,” Craft Horizons, August, 1948, Vol 8 No. 22, pp. 3–5.
