= M.C.E. van Schoor =

South African writer and historian (1920–2009)

Tienie van Schoor
- Born: Marthinus Cornelius Ellnarius van Schoor; 24 November 1920; Bloemfontein
- Died: 25 July 2009 (aged 88); Kleinmond
- Occupations: writer, historian
- Spouse: Betha
- Children: 6

Marthinus Cornelius Ellnarius "Tienie" van Schoor (1920 - 2009) was a historian and author of numerous books on the history of the Afrikaner and the Second War of Independence. He saw it as his life's work to thoroughly research and document the Free State Tripartite, pres. Martinus Theunis Steyn, gen. Christiaan de Wet and the Rev. J. D. Kestell.

== Biography ==
Tienie van Schoor was born on 24 November 1920 in Bloemfontein. He matriculated at Hoërskool Jan van Riebeeck in Cape Town. He then obtained his master's degree in history with distinction from the University of the Free State, and his doctorate from Potchefstroom University for C.H.O..

From 1949 he was a history teacher at Hoërskool Sentraal in Bloemfontein for ten years. In 1959 he became a history lecturer at the University of the Free State. He was the head of the department from 1977 to 1985.

Van Schoor was a member of the National Women's Monument Commission from 1963 and was also its chairman for 16 years.

Van Schoor died in his sleep in Kleinmond on 25 July 2009 at the age of 88. He is survived by his wife Betha, six children and eleven grandchildren.

== Books ==
Some of his books for illustration:

- Huldiging van ons heldinne, F.A.K., 1949 (co-author)
- Politieke groeperinge in Transgariep: Veldkornet en sy aandeel in die opbou van die Suid-Afrikaanse Republiek tot 1870, Volume 13, Cape Times, 1950 (medeskrywer)
- Die nasionale en politieke bewuswording van die Afrikaner in migrasie en sy ontluiking in Transgariep tot 1854, P.U. vir C.H.O., 1961
- Die Tweetoringkerk: vyf-en-sewentig jaar 1880-1955, Merino Drukkers, 1955 (co-author )
- Die Vrystaatse Helpmekaar: die ontstaan van die Helpmekaar-beweging in Suid-Afrika en sy besondere ontwikkeling in die Oranje-Vrystaat, Sentrale Pers, 1960
- Republieke en republikeine, Kaapstad & Bloemfontein, 1960
- Die Nederduitse Gereformeerde Kerk in die Oranje-Vrystaat, 1963
- Die geskiedenis van Bethlehem, 1864-1964, Bethlehemse Stadsraad, 1964 (co-author)
- Ons nasionale feesdae: Van Riebeeckdag 6 April, Republiekdag 31 Mei, Setlaarsdag September, Krugerdag 10 Oktober, Geloftedag 16 Desember, Nasionale handelsdrukkery, 1967
- Eeufeesgedenkboek - N.G. gemeente Lindley, N.G. Kerk, Lindley, 1976 (co-author)
- Geskiedenis vir Standerd 8. O.V.S.-leerplan, Nasou, 1968 (co-author)
- My eerste groot boek oor ons land: 'n kindergeskiedenis van Suid-Afrika, Tafelberg, 1968 (co-author)
- 60 jaar op die Bult, University of the Free State, 1970
- Dagboek van Hugo H. van Niekerk, Suid-Afrikaanse Akademie vir Wetenskap en Kuns, 1972
- Spotprente van die Anglo-Boereoorlog, Tafelberg, 1981
- Vegkop, National Monuments Council, 1984
- Dr. D.F. Malan en Koalisie, Tafelberg, 1988 (co-author)
- 'n Bittereinder aan die woord: geskrifte en toesprake van Marthinus Theunis Steyn, Oorlogsmuseum van die Boererepublieke, 1997
- President M.T. Steyn: sy rol in die Anglo-Boereoorlog, 1899-1902, Suid-Afrikaanse Akademie vir Wetenskap en Kuns, 1999
- Die Rebellie: my tog deur die woestyn na Duitswes, Oorlogsmuseum van die Boererepublieke, 2000 (co-author)
- 'n Bloemlesing: Genl. C.R. de Wet, Oorlogsmuseum van die Boererepublieke, 2000 (co-author)
- Die Bittereinde Vrede: vredespogings en -onderhandelinge voor en tydens die Anglo-Boereoorlog, 1899-1902, Kraal-Uitgewers, 2007 (co-author)
