= Naomi Schor =

American literary critic and theorist

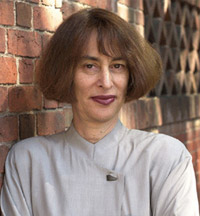
- Naomi Schor, c. 2000
- Born: October 10, 1943; New York City
- Died: December 2, 2001 (aged 58); New Haven, Connecticut
- Education: Barnard College (B.A.); Yale University (PhD)
- Occupations: Literary critic & Theorist

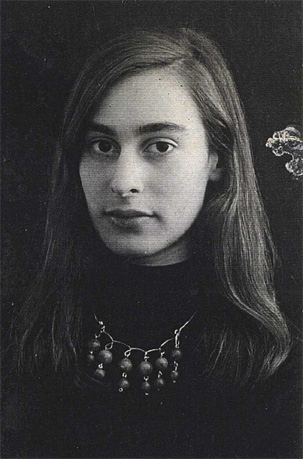
Naomi Schor, 1960

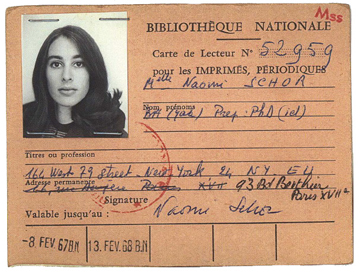
Naomi Schor Library ID

Naomi Schor (October 10, 1943 in New York City – December 2, 2001 in New Haven, Connecticut) was an American literary critic and theorist. A pioneer of feminist theory for her generation, she is regarded as one of the foremost scholars of French literature and critical theory of her time. Naomi's younger sister is the artist and writer Mira Schor.

== Early life and education ==
At the time of her birth, Naomi Schor's Polish-born parents Ilya and Resia Schor were artists who had recently immigrated to the US as refugees from war-torn Europe. Ilya Schor was a painter, jeweler and artist of Judaica, and Resia Schor was a painter who later worked in silver and gold and mixed media on sculptural jewelry and Judaica. The Schors lived among a polyglot community of émigrés, among them musicians, intellectuals, and artists. Naomi Schor’s first language was French, and she went to the Lycée Français de New York where she received her Baccalauréat in 1961, the same year, sadly, that her father died. Schor received her B.A. in English Literature from Barnard College then received her PhD in French Literature from Yale. There Schor occasionally wrote her scholarly essays in French.

== Scholarship ==
Schor was one of the early proponents of French psychoanalytic and deconstructive theory in American literary studies. She wrote about canonical authors such as Émile Zola, Gustave Flaubert, Marcel Proust, Honoré de Balzac, re-examining their work through the double lens of the male-authored theoretical discourse of Jacques Derrida (whom she knew personally), Roland Barthes, and Jacques Lacan, and that of French feminist theoreticians such as Julia Kristeva, Hélène Cixous, and Luce Irigaray.

Schor was the founding co-editor of differences: A Journal of Feminist Cultural Studies, in 1989, a critical forum where the problematics of difference is explored in texts ranging from the literary and the visual to the political and social.

An area of Schor’s expertise was the work of the feminist psychoanalytic theorist Luce Irigaray. With Carolyn Burke and Margaret Whitford, she edited Engaging with Irigaray, which included essays by Rosi Braidotti, Elizabeth Weed, and Judith Butler. With differences co-founder and co-editor Weed, Schor edited a number of differences books, including The Essential Difference in 1994 and Feminism Meets Queer Theory in 1997.

Reading in Detail: Aesthetics and the Feminine is considered one of Schor’s most influential books. In this classic 1987 work of aesthetic and feminist theory, available in a 2006 paperback edition, Schor provided new ways of thinking about the gendering of details and ornament in literature, art, and architecture.

In other writings she developed the concept of female fetishism, in her many writings on the work of George Sand; she examined the question of idealism, also in relation to Sand, and in her late writings and research revisited the concept of universalism in an era of identity politics and difference.

== Awards and honors ==
Schor was the recipient of numerous awards and honors, including a Woodrow Wilson Fellowship (1963–64), a number of Fulbright Award Fellowships to France, NEH Fellowships (1981 and 1990–91), a Guggenheim Fellowship in 1990: She was also elected member of the American Academy of Arts and Sciences in 1997. Schor taught at Columbia, Brown (from 1978 to 1989) where she held the Nancy Duke Lewis Chair from 1985 to 1989, Duke where she was the William Hanes Wannamaker Professor of Romance Studies Chair, and Harvard. At the time of her death (of a brain hemorrhage) Schor was the Benjamin F. Barge professor of French at Yale.

Naomi Schor’s papers are part of the Pembroke Center Archive's Elizabeth Weed Feminist Theory Papers collection, held at the John Hay Library at Brown University.

== Personal life ==
At the time of her death she was married to R. Howard Bloch, Sterling Professor of French and Chair of the Humanities Program at Yale. A first marriage, to Breton poet Paol Keineg, ended in divorce.

== Works ==
=== Books ===
- Bad Objects: Essays Popular and Unpopular, Duke University Press, 1995.
- George Sand and Idealism, Gender and Culture Series, Columbia University Press, 1993.
- Reading in Detail: Aesthetics and the Feminine, originally published by Methuen Press, 1987, reissued by Taylor & Francis, 2006, with introduction by Ellen Rooney.
- Breaking the Chain: Women, Theory, and French Realist Fiction, Columbia University Press, 1985.
- Zola’s Crowds, Johns Hopkins University Press, 1978.

=== Edited volumes ===
- Decadent Subjects: The Idea of Decadence in Art, Literature, Philosophy and Culture of the Fin de Siècle in Europe, by Charles Bernheimer, eds. T. Jefferson Kline and Naomi Schor, Johns Hopkins University Press, 2002.
- Feminism Meets Queer Theory (with Elizabeth Weed), Indiana University Press, 1997.
- Engaging with Irigaray (with Carolyn Burke and Margaret Whitford), Columbia University Press, 1994.
- The Essential Difference Naomi Schor and Elizabeth Weed, eds., Indiana University Press, 1994.
- Flaubert and Postmodernism Naomi Schor and Henry F. Majewski, eds., University of Nebraska Press, 1984.

=== Essays ===
- "Pensive Texts and Thinking Statues: Balzac with Rodin," Critical Inquiry 27 (2), 2001: 239–264.
- “Blindness as Metaphor,” differences 11, Number 2, Summer 1999, 76-105.
- “Anti-Semitism, Jews and the Universal,” October 87, Winter 1999, 107–111.
- "One Hundred Years of Melancholy. The Zaharoff Lecture for 1996," Romantisme (Clarendon Press, TKyear) 1–15.
- "Reading in Detail: Hegel's Aesthetics and the Feminine," reprinted in Patricia Jagentowicz Mills, ed. Feminist Interpretations of G.W.F. Hegel. (Pennsylvania State University Press, 1995), 119–147.
- "French Feminism is a Universalism", differences 7.1, 1995.
- "Cartes Postales: Representing Paris 1900." Critical Inquiry 18, Winter 1992, 188-245.
- "The Scandal of Realism," in Hollier, Denis, ed., A New History of French Literature (Harvard University Press, 1989), 656–660.
- “This Essentialism Which is Not One,” differences 2, 1989, 38-58
- "Idealism," in Hollier, A New History, 769–773.
- "Simone de Beauvoir: A Thinking Woman's Woman," L.A. Times, May 19, 1986.
- "Roland Barthes: Necrologies", Sub-Stance 48, 1986, 27-33.
- "Female Fetishism: The Case of George Sand." Poetics Today 6, 1985, 301-310. Reprinted in Suleiman, Susan. Ed. The Female Body in Western Culture: Contemporary Approaches, Harvard University Press, 1986, 363–372.
- "Female Paranoia: The Case for Psychoanalytic Feminist Criticism." Yale French Studies 62, 1981, 204-219.
- "Le Détail chez Freud", Littérature 37 (1980), 3-14.
- "Le Délire d'interprétation: naturalism et paranoia," in Le naturalisme: Colloque de Cerisy, Paris, 10/18, 1978, 237–255.
- "Dalí's Freud", Dada/Surrealism 6, 1976, 10-17.
- “Le Sourire du sphinx: Zola et l'énigme de la fémininité", Romantisme 12-14, 1976, 183-195.

== Colloquia and conferences ==
- "Romancing the Dead," Feminist Theory, Brown University September 1995; Keynote address, 21st Annual Meeting, Nineteenth-Century French Studies Colloquium, October 1995; Longest Lecture, Ole Miss, November 1995; Zaharoff Lecture, Oxford University, 1996.
- "Il et Elle: Croisset et Nohant," Colloque de Nohant, Nohant, Septembre 1991.
- "George Sand and Feminism: Lettres à Marcie," Feminist Theory: An International Debate, University of Glasgow, July 1991.
- "Triste Amérique: Atala and the Post-Revolutionary Construction of Woman," Keynote Address, "Woman and Representation," Rhode Island College. April 1989.

"Woman and the French Revolution," UCLA, October 1989; Danziger Memorial Lecture. The University of Chicago, May 1990.

- "Roland Barthes: Necrologies," 2nd International Conference on Translation, Barnard College, November 1984.
- "Roland Barthes' Aesthetics," Dimensions of Narrative Conference, Brown University, November 1983.
- "Female Fetishism: The Case of George Sand," Eight Annual Nineteenth Century Colloquium in French Studies, University of Massachusetts Amherst. October 1982; Colloquium on "Women and Signs," July, 1983, Urbino, Italy; Berkshire Conference, June 1984.
- "Details and Realism: La Curé de Tours," "Synopsis IV," the Porter Institute for Semiotics and Poetics, Tel-Aviv University, May 1982.
- "Salammbo enchainée: Femme et Ville dans Salammbo," Journé d'etudes: Flaubert, La Femme, la Ville. Centennaire de la mort de Gustave Flaubert, Célébrations Nationales, Paris, France, November 1980; Flaubert Colloquium, University of Bielefeld, West Germany, May 1981.
- "Le Statut du détail chez Freud," colloque sur le fragment, Université de Montréal, March 1978; Brown University, March 1978.
- "Le délire d'interprétation: naturalisme et paranoia", Colloquium on Naturalism, Cerisy, France, July 1976.
