= Max Schürer =

Swiss astronomer (1910–1997)

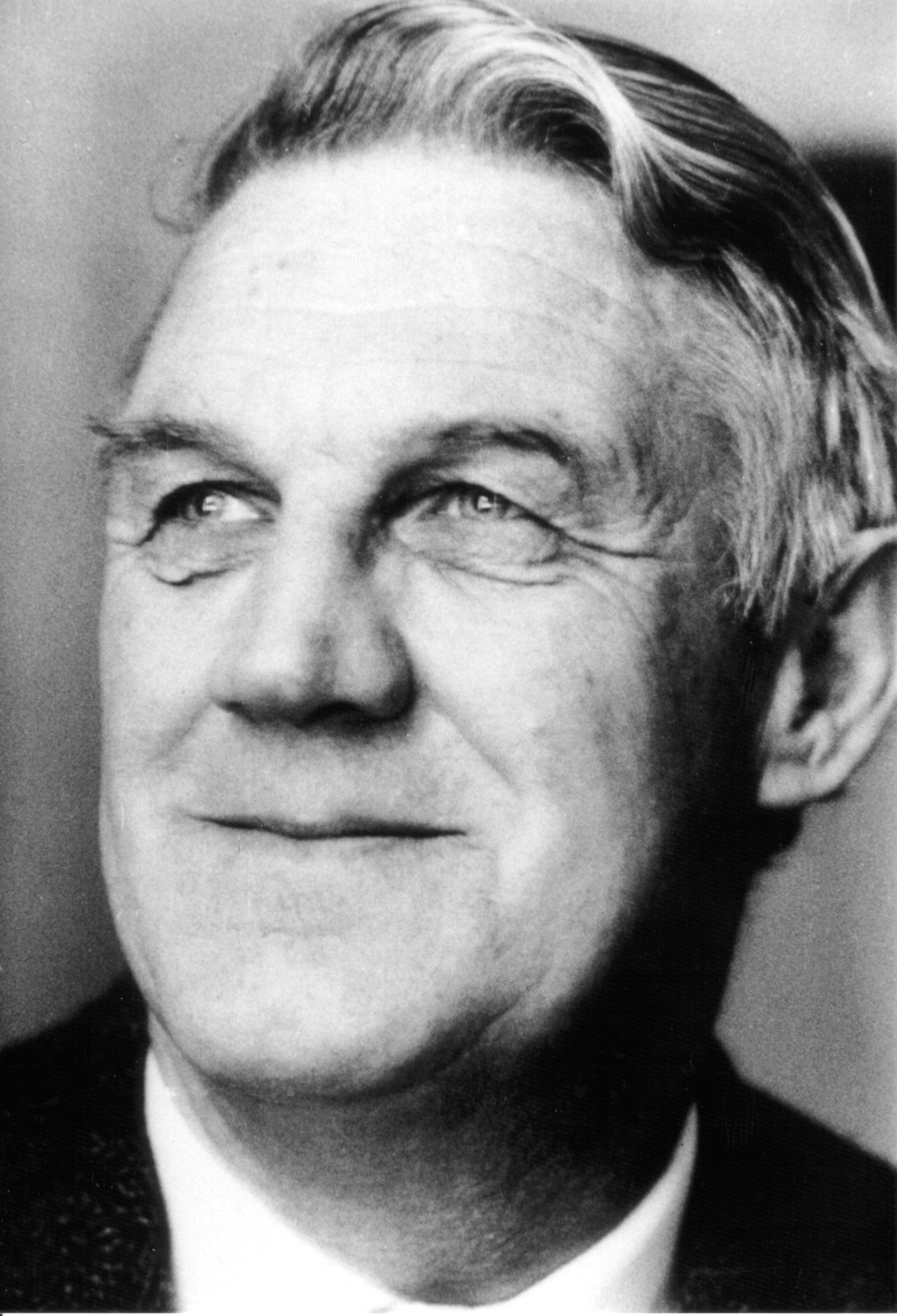
- Max Schürer in 1975
- Born: April 18, 1910; Vienna, Austria
- Died: October 10, 1997 (aged 87); Bern, Switzerland
- Spouse: Helena Marianne Wilhelm
- Parents: Ernst Max Schürer (father); Maria Broglie (mother)
- Scientific career
- Fields: Astronomy, Mathematics, Geodesy
- Workplaces: University of Bern, Zimmerwald Observatory

Max Schürer (Vienna, April 1910 – Bern, 10 October 1997) was a Swiss mathematician, astronomer and geodesist. As director of the Astronomical Institute of the University of Bern, he founded the Zimmerwald Observatory in 1955, which was subsequently expanded into a world renowned satellite observation station.

== Life ==
Max Schürer was born in Vienna in 1910 as the son of the musician Ernst Max Schürer and Maria Broglie. His father moved to Bern after World War I, where he found a job as a musician with the Bern City Orchestra.

After attending secondary school in Bern, the young Max Schürer graduated from the Hofwil teachers' seminar and the Muesmatt secondary seminar in Bern, where his mathematical talent became apparent. This was followed by studies in mathematics and astronomy in Berlin and Bern. In 1935, Schürer found an assistant position at the Astronomical Institute (AIUB) of the University of Bern (UB). In 1937 he received the diploma for the higher teaching profession. In the same year, he received his doctorate in mathematics, physics and astronomy from the University Library. Schürer married Helena Marianne Wilhelm in Bern.

Interrupted by military service during World War II, Schürer worked on his habilitation thesis, which he submitted to the Faculty of Philosophy II of the University Library in 1942. In 1946, he became an associate professor of astronomy at the University Library, and in 1949 a full professor.

From 1946 to 1980, Schürer was director of the AIUB, and for a time dean of the natural philosophy, faculty of the University Library, and, from 1968 to 1980, part-time lecturer for higher geodesy at the Eidg. ETH Zurich University of Applied Sciences (ETHZ). In 1946 he became a member, in 1958 vice-president, and from 1973 to 1980 president of the Swiss Geodetic Commission (SGK), an organ of the Swiss Society of Natural Sciences SNG (now SCNAT). After that, he was a permanent guest of honour of the SGK until his death. Schürer was a member of the International Astronomical Union (IAU), as well as a founding member of the Swiss Astronomical Society (SAG) and, for a time, its president.

Max Schürer died in Bern on 10 October 1997 at the age of 87.

== Astronomy ==
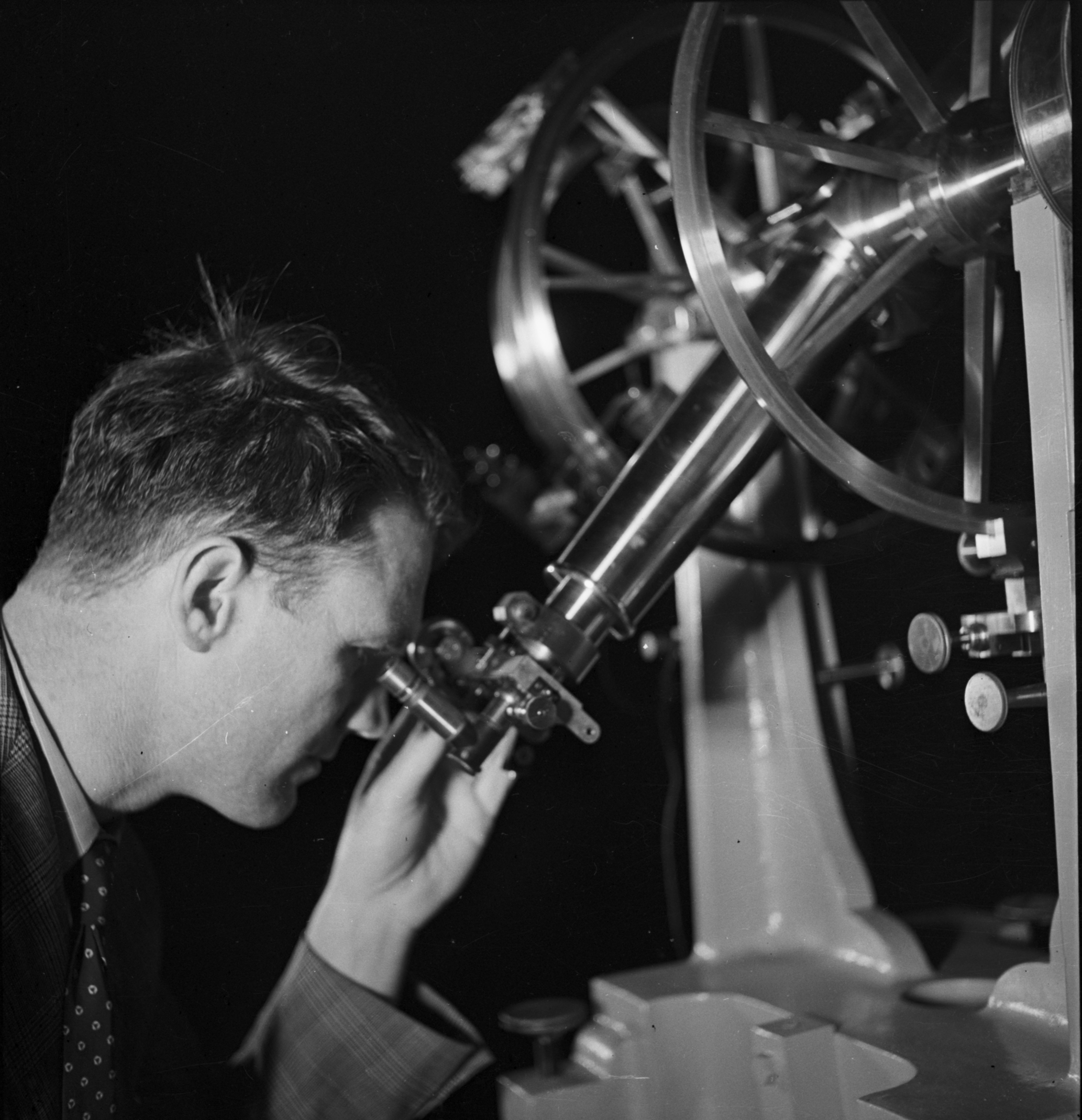
Max Schürer at the meridian instrument, photo of the Tschirren estate, Bern State Archives (circa 1940)

The founder of the AIUB and the Muesmatt Observatory in Bern, Sigmund Mauderli, brought the young graduate of the advanced seminary Max Schürer to his institute in 1935 as an assistant and doctoral student. Schürer was mainly concerned with tasks of celestial mechanics, such as orbit determination and perturbation calculation of minor planets. He received his doctorate from the University Library in 1937 with his dissertation "On the theoretical and practical definition of an inertial system". During a semester of study in Berlin, he became interested in the then topical topic of stellar dynamics. In 1942 he habilitated in Bern with a "Contribution to the Dynamics of Star Systems", in which he found, among other things, an elegant derivation of the Chandrasekhar transformation.

In 1946, Schürer succeeded Sigmund Mauderli as director of the AIUB. The study of the structure, dynamics and structure of the Milky Way was initially Schürer's field of research, which was undoubtedly motivated by his close friendship and correspondence with Emanuel von der Pahlen (1882–1952), and was significantly promoted by his doctoral student and habilitation candidate Rudolf Kurth. After a few years, Schürer realized that observations of scientific relevance were no longer possible in the then Muesmatt Observatory due to increasing light pollution, apart from the regular observation of the occultations of the moon. As a result, he planned a "branch observatory" outside the city, which promised better observation conditions away from the city lights.

The Zimmerwald Observatory was built in 1955/56 on a hilltop above the village of Zimmerwald, about 15 km south of Bern at about 950 meters above sea level. The new observatory was equipped in 1959 with a 60/40 cm Schmidt-Cassegrain double telescope designed by Schürer and constructed at the AIUB, which was suitable for optical sky monitoring (visual and photographic), especially for supernovae searches. On March 1, 1957, Schürer discovered supernova SN 1957A in the galaxy NGC 2841 with a provisional 'small Schmidt'. The observation program initiated by Fritz Zwicky was successfully continued until the end of the 1990s, mainly by Zwicky's assistant at CalTech and later director of the AIUB, Paul Wild. In total, about 50 supernovae, 3 novae, 6 comets, and almost 100 minor planets have been discovered in Zimmerwald. In 1977, Paul Wild found the asteroid 2429, designated 1977 TZ, which he named "Schürer" in honor of the founder of the observatory.

In the early 1960s, Schürer recognized the potential of the burgeoning space research for the AIUB. The commissioning (first light) of the Zimmerwald Observatory practically coincided with the beginning of the space age (the launch of the Russian satellite Sputnik 1 in 1957). As it turned out, the Schmidt-Cassegrain double telescope was also suitable for optical (photographic) observation of artificial Earth satellites.

Schürer gave countless popular lectures and wrote many articles on astronomy in the magazine 'Orion' of the SAG, of which he was the main editor for many years.

== Geodesy and land surveying ==
Schürer was already interested in geodesy and land surveying during his studies. In 1943, he carried out the calculations for the gravity reduction and equalization of the Swiss National Leveling Network using the least squares method. He completed this task during his military service on behalf of the Eidg. Landestopographie (L+T, now the Federal Office of Topography swisstopo), and published the results in 1944.

After his election as a member of the SGK in 1946, geodesy became another area of interest for Schürer alongside astronomy. His expertise as an astronomer was very welcome during the commission's astrogeodesic projects that were current at the time. The determination of the geoid of Switzerland was one of his special concerns. He developed ideas for its area-wide determination and initiated a dissertation on this topic. The work was carried out by his assistant Werner Gurtner at the ETHZ and published in 1978. The result was the first geoid model in Switzerland that could be used in surveying practice.

At the suggestion of Fritz Kobold, then president of the SGK and professor at the ETHZ, Schürer expanded the field of research at the AIUB to include the newly emerging satellite geodesy from 1963 onwards. The Schmidt-Cassegrain double telescope in Zimmerwald was used, among other things, for the optical-photographic observation of artificial satellites. Since 1971, laser distance measurements to satellites, known as satellite laser ranging (SLR), have also been carried out using a laser telemeter experimentally mounted on this telescope.

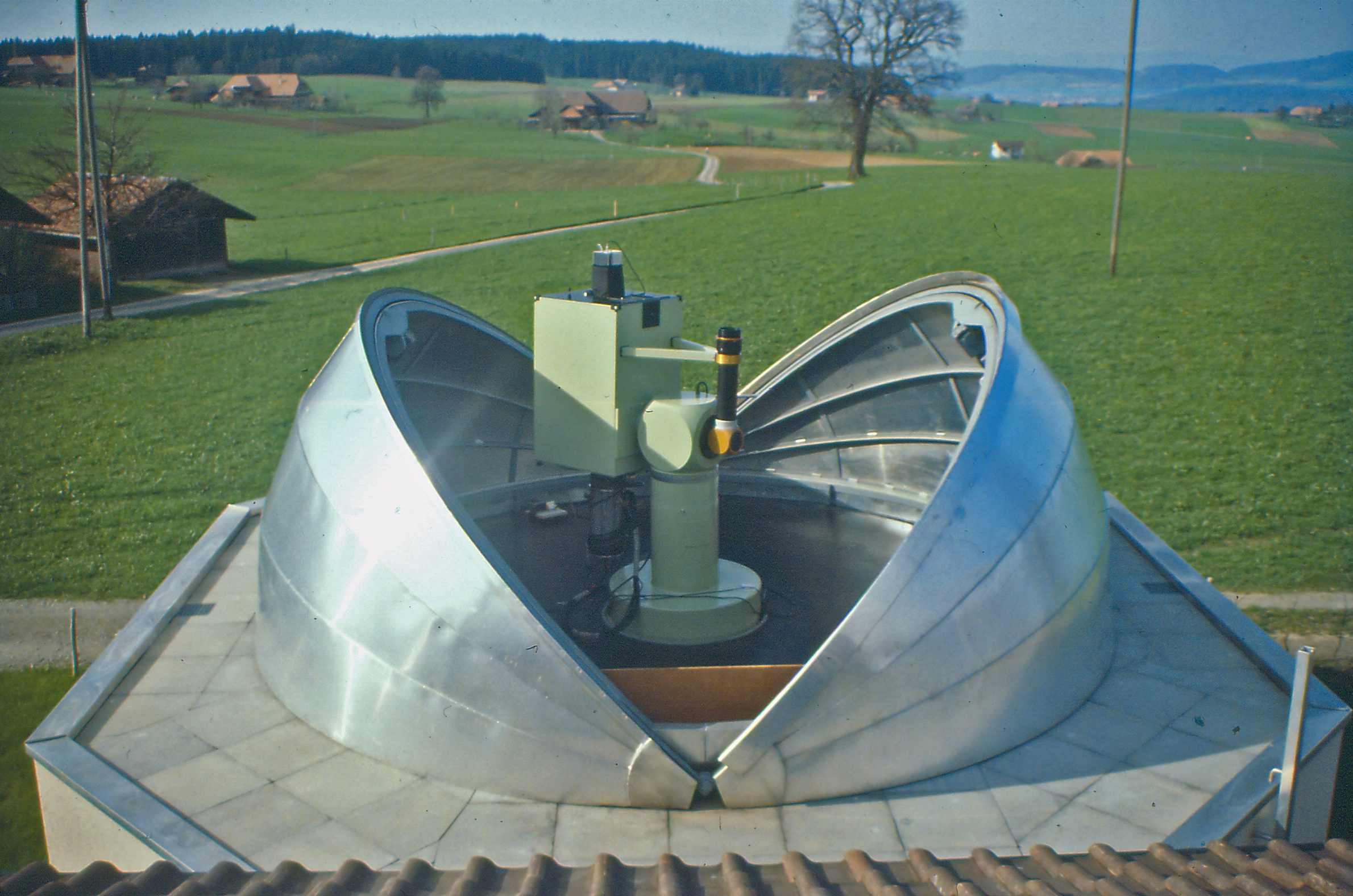
50 cm laser telemeter in the open Allsky dome, photo AIUB, circa 1976

In 1974, under the direction of Schürer and Willy Lüthy from the Institute of Applied Physics (IAP) of the University Library in Zimmerwald, another dome was built for satellite geodesy and especially for SLR. A laser telemeter specially developed at the University Library, equipped with a ruby laser, was installed in an Allsky dome. The instrument developed at the IAP and AIUB with a mirror diameter of 52.5 cm consisted of separate transmitting and receiving telescopes (see image). The SLR observation operation was started on a trial basis from 1976 and from 1978 as part of international measurement campaigns. The AIUB team has developed the Zimmerwald Observatory into the world renowned Swiss OGS (Swiss Optical Ground Station and Geodynamics Observatory) to this day. Today, it also serves as the fundamental station of the new national survey of Switzerland LV95.

In 1968, Schürer took over the teaching assignment of Higher Geodesy at the ETHZ. He imparted in-depth knowledge of mathematical and physical geodesy to the surveying and cultural engineers (today geomatics engineers) as well as insights into the [then] new field of satellite geodesy.

Schürer recognized the advantages of the three-dimensional calculation and compensation of geodetic networks (3D geodesy) in the alpine topography of Switzerland. The work "Rational Treatment of Three-Dimensional Geodesy", which he published with Ivo Baueršíma in 1976, contains an elegant mathematical model that describes the treatment of 3D geodesy with the help of analytic geometry. He had his engineering students from the ETHZ test the new method in practice using the example of a geodetic network in Domleschg (GR).

After his retirement from the University Library and the ETHZ, Schürer continued to follow developments in geodesy and land surveying. At L+T, he supported the geodesists in the software development and application of 3D and astrogeodesy in the context of the introduction of GPS in land surveying. In 1987 he published a 3D rebalancing of the SGK's Heerbrugg base enlargement network.

== Selected publications ==
- On the theoretical and practical definition of an inertial system. Inaugural dissertation University of Bern, Kiel, 1937.
- The conditions of motion in our Milky Way system. In: Mitteilungen der Naturforschenden Gesellschaft Bern, Sitzungsbericht 1937 (1938). XII-XIV.
- Contribution to the dynamics of stellar systems. (Habilitation thesis). In: Astronomische Nachrichten, No. 273 (1943). pp. 230–242.
- The reduction and equalization of the Swiss. state levelling. Annexe au Proc.verb. de la 88 séance de la C.G.S., Bern, Verlag L+T, 1944.
- The precession and nutation of the earth. In: Elemente der Mathematik, 3 (1948). pp. 54–59.
- The geoid of Switzerland. In: Verhandlungen der SNG, 131 (1951), p. 102.
- The reference systems of geodesy. In: Zeitschrift für Vermessung, Photogrammetrie und Kulturtechnik, Band 71-M, Nr. 12 (1973). pp. 232–235.
- Works of the Lake Constance Conference. Basic measurement Heerbrugg 1959. Astronomical-geodetic work of Switzerland. Vol. 30, Part VI. SGK 1987. PDF; 22.5 MB)
- The Swiss geodetic date. In: Swiss Journal of Surveying, Photogrammetry and Cultural Technology, Volume 88, No. 2 (1990). pp. 88–89.
