= Schor =

Schor may refer to:

- Ignacio Schor (born 2000), Argentine footballer
- Ilya Schor, (1904–1961), American painter, jeweler, engraver, sculptor, and artist of Judaica
- Johann Paul Schor (1615–1674), Austrian painter
- Juliet Schor (born 1955), American sociologist
- Lynda Schor (born 1950), American writer
- Mira Schor (born 1950), American artist
- Naomi Schor (1943–2001), American literary critic and theorist
- Olga Schor (1894–1978), art and literary historian
- Nina F. Schor, American pediatric neurologist
- Resia Schor, (1910–2006), Polish-born American artist

== See also ==
- Commodity Futures Trading Commission v. Schor, a U.S. Supreme Court case
- Schor, Schore, Schoor/van Schoor, Schorr, Shor, Shore, Shorr, Schur
