= 2429 Schürer =

Main-belt asteroid

Discovery
- Discovered by: P. Wild
- Discovery site: Zimmerwald Obs.
- Discovery date: 12 October 1977

Designations
- Named after: Max Schürer (Swiss astronomer)
- Alternative designations: 1977 TZ · A915 TB
- Minor planet category: main-belt · (middle); Maria

Orbital characteristics
- Epoch 27 April 2019 (JD 2458600.5)
- Uncertainty parameter 0
- Observation arc: 103.02 yr (37,629 d)
- Aphelion: 2.8341 AU
- Perihelion: 2.3098 AU
- Semi-major axis: 2.5719 AU
- Eccentricity: 0.1019
- Orbital period (sidereal): 4.12 yr (1,507 d)
- Mean anomaly: 5.5233°
- Mean motion: 0° 14^{m} 20.4^{s} / day
- Inclination: 15.055°
- Longitude of ascending node: 17.893°
- Argument of perihelion: 30.008°

Physical characteristics
- Mean diameter: 11.582±0.133 km 13.27±3.55 km 15.95±0.38 km 15.99±0.26 km
- Synodic rotation period: 6.66±0.05 h
- Geometric albedo: 0.096; 0.120±0.023; 0.16; 0.1976; 0.229
- Spectral type: S (assumed)
- Absolute magnitude (H): 11.90; 12.0; 12.20; 12.21

2429 Schürer, provisional designation 1977 TZ, is a Maria asteroid from the central region of the asteroid belt, approximately 12 kilometers (7 miles) in diameter. It was discovered on 12 October 1977, by Swiss astronomer Paul Wild at Zimmerwald Observatory near Bern, Switzerland, and later named after Swiss astronomer Max Schürer. The likely elongated S-type asteroid has a rotation period of 6.6 hours.

== Orbit and classification ==
Schürer is a member of the Maria family (506), a large family of stony asteroids with nearly 3000 known members, named after asteroid 170 Maria. The family is old, about (3±1)×10^{9} years, and located near the 3:1 resonant region with Jupiter that supplies near-Earth objects to the inner Solar System. It is estimated that every 100 million years, about 37 to 75 Maria asteroids larger than 1 kilometer become such near-Earth objects.

It orbits the Sun in the central main-belt at a distance of 2.3–2.8 AU once every 4 years and 1 month (1,507 days; semi-major axis of 2.57 AU). Its orbit has an eccentricity of 0.10 and an inclination of 15° with respect to the ecliptic. The body's observation arc begins with a precovery taken at Heidelberg Observatory in October 1915, or 62 years prior to its official discovery observation at Zimmerwald.

== Naming ==
This minor planet was named in honor of Swiss astronomer Max Schürer (1910–1997), who was director of the Astronomical Institute of the University of Bern from 1947 to 1980. Due to his initiative, endurance, and great technical competence, the discovering observatory at Zimmerwald – after which the asteroid 1775 Zimmerwald is named – could be built in 1956. He did a lot of orbit computation on asteroids when he was a pupil of astronomer Sigmund Mauderli (1876–1962), who was the preceding director of the Astronomical Institute (also see 1748 Mauderli). Schürer also dealt with stellar dynamics and was deeply involved as a pioneer in satellite geodesy. The official naming citation was published by the Minor Planet Center on 10 November 1992 (M.P.C. 21129).

== Physical characteristics ==
Schürer is an assumed S-type asteroid, and corresponds to the overall stony spectral type of the Maria family.

=== Rotation period ===
In February 2012, a rotational lightcurve of Schürer was obtained from photometric observations by an international collaboration under the lead of South Korean astronomers. Lightcurve analysis gave a rotation period of 6.66±0.05 hours with a brightness amplitude of 0.77 magnitude, indicative of an elongated, non-spherical shape (U=3-).

A modeled lightcurve using photometric data from Gaia's DR2 catalog was published in 2018. It gave a similar sidereal period of 6.5119±0.0002 hours, as well as a spin axis at (235.0°, −26.0°) in ecliptic coordinates (λ, β).

=== Diameter and albedo ===
According to the surveys carried out by the NEOWISE mission of NASA's Wide-field Infrared Survey Explorer, Schürer measures between 11.58 and 16.0 kilometers in diameter and its surface has an albedo between 0.096 and 0.229. while the Japanese Akari satellite gives a diameter of 15.95 km with a low albedo of 0.096. The Collaborative Asteroid Lightcurve Link assumes an albedo of 0.21 and calculates a diameter of 11.55 kilometers based on an absolute magnitude of 12.0.
