= Pošná =

- Municipality
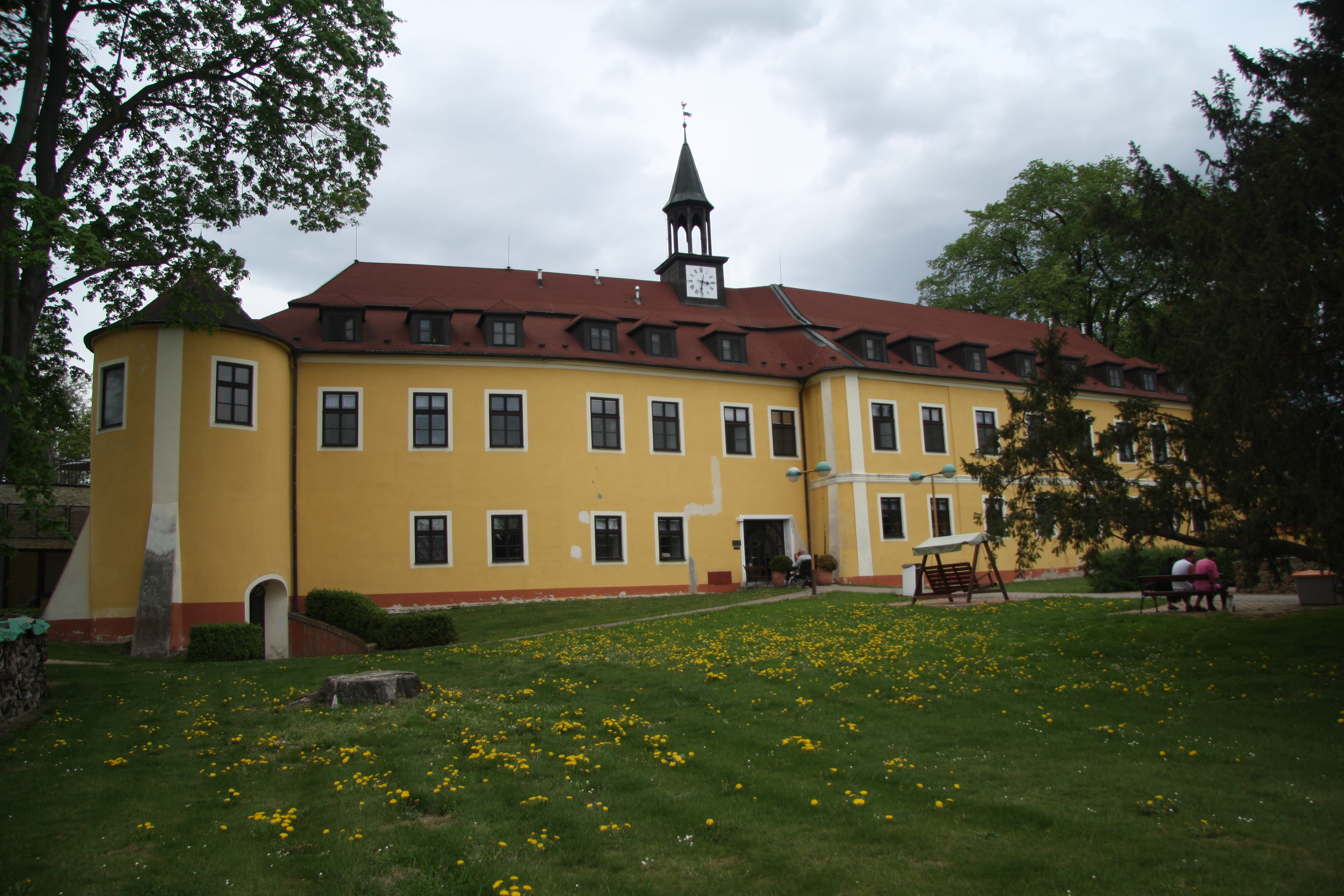
- Proseč Castle, now a retirement home

- Location in the Czech Republic
- Coordinates: 49°27′32″N 15°2′32″E
- Country: Czech Republic
- Region: Vysočina
- District: Pelhřimov
- First mentioned: 1369

Area
  - Total: 13.33 km^{2} (5.15 sq mi)
- Elevation: 557 m (1,827 ft)

Population (2026-01-01)
  - Total: 270
  - Density: 20/km^{2} (52/sq mi)
- Time zone: UTC+1 (CET)
  - Summer (DST): UTC+2 (CEST)
- Postal code: 395 01
- Website: www.posna.cz

Pošná is a municipality and village in Pelhřimov District in the Vysočina Region of the Czech Republic. It has about 300 inhabitants.

Pošná lies approximately 13 kilometres (8 mi) west of Pelhřimov, 40 km (25 mi) west of Jihlava, and 84 km (52 mi) south-east of Prague.

== Administrative division ==
Pošná consists of four municipal parts (in brackets population according to the 2021 census):

- Pošná (139)
- Nesvačily (12)
- Proseč (120)
- Zahrádka (24)

== Demographics ==
Historical population
Year	Pop.	±%
1869	870	—
1880	879	+1.0%
1890	869	−1.1%
1900	863	−0.7%
1910	875	+1.4%
1921	854	−2.4%
1930	741	−13.2%
1950	504	−32.0%
1961	513	+1.8%
1970	408	−20.5%
1980	373	−8.6%
1991	270	−27.6%
2001	221	−18.1%
2011	281	+27.1%
2021	295	+5.0%
Source: Censuses
