= Joseph ben Isaac Bekhor Shor =

French tosafist, exegete and poet

- יוֹסֵף בֶּן־יִצחָק בְּכוֹר־שׁוֹר
- Born: Orléans, France
- Occupations: Tosafist, exegete, poet
- Relatives: Abraham ben Joseph of Orleans; Saadia Bekhor Shor (sons)

Joseph ben Isaac Bekhor Shor of Orléans (12th century) (Hebrew: יוֹסֵף בֶּן־יִצחָק בְּכוֹר־שׁוֹר) was a French tosafist, exegete, and poet who flourished in the second half of the 12th century. He was the father of Abraham ben Joseph of Orleans and Saadia Bekhor Shor.

== Biography ==
Joseph was a pupil of Jacob Tam, Joseph Kara, and Rashbam. That "Joseph Bekhor Shor" and the tosafist "Joseph ben Isaac of Orléans" are the same person has been sufficiently demonstrated by Gross, who showed that the same explanations given in the Tosafot in the name of "Joseph ben Isaac", are quoted in the Semak and in Meir of Rothenburg's Responsa as those of "Joseph Bekhor Shor."

Joseph was on very friendly terms with his teacher Jacob Tam, with whom he carried on a learned correspondence.

== Biblical commentary ==
Besides tosafot on the greater part of the Talmud, Joseph wrote a notable Biblical commentary. Even more than Rashi, to whose exegetical school he belonged, he confined himself to literal interpretations (peshat). Anticipating later Biblical criticism, he assumed the presence of duplicate narratives in the Bible, and he strove to give rational explanations to the miraculous stories. Thus he interprets "tree of life" (Genesis 2:9) as "tree of healing", explaining that the fruit of the tree possessed the virtue of healing the sick, without, however, bestowing eternal life. In regard to the transformation of Lot's wife into a pillar of salt (Genesis 19:26) he explains that, disbelieving in the destruction of Sodom and Gomorrah, she lingered on the road, and was overtaken by the rain of brimstone and fire, which are usually mixed with salt.

Well acquainted with the Vulgate and Christian Biblical exegesis, Joseph, in commenting on Psalm 2, cites Jerome, whose explanation of the word "bar" (in Aramaic: "son") he criticizes.

He was explicitly anti-Christian, as shown by his commentaries on Genesis 1:26 (against the belief in the Trinity), on Numbers 12:8 (against Christian allegorizing) and on Deuteronomy 13 (attempting to connect the magical powers of false prophets with the miracles of Jesus in the New Testament).

His commentary on the Pentateuch is still extant in manuscript in the libraries of Leyden and Munich. Part of it, on Genesis and Exodus, was published by Jellinek Extracts from the remaining books were published by Abraham Berliner in Peleṭat Soferim (1872). The entire commentary was published in Hebrew by Mossad HaRav Kook.

== Selichot ==
Joseph was the author also of a number of liturgical poems (piyyutim). Besides the short hymns in the style of Ibn Ezra with which he concludes each section of the commentary, he wrote the following selihot:

- ד' אליך עיני ישברו, believed by Zunz to have been written on the martyrs of Blois and Bray
- מועד אדון כתקח, fourteen strophes
- אדון רב העלילה, with two refrains – והשב and ושוב
- אין לבנון די בער, fifteen strophes, ending with לה' אלהינו הרחמים והסליחות
- אל אלהי האלהים ואדוני, fourteen strophes
- ממכון שבתך אלהים, twenty-six strophes
