= Schürer =

Schürer, Schurer, Schuerer or Schürrer is a German surname. Notable people with the surname include:

- Charlotta Ulrica Schürer von Waldheim (1770–1835), Swedish artist
- Christoph Schürer (c. 1500–c. 1560), German natural scientist and glassmaker
- Eddy Schurer (born 1964), Dutch cyclist
- Emil Schürer (1844–1910), German theologian
- Erna Schürer (born 1942), Italian actress, model and television hostess
- Ewald Schurer (1954–2017), German politician
- Fedde Schurer (1898–1968), Dutch schoolteacher, journalist, language activist and politician
- Franz de Paula Schürer (1821 or 1822–1886), Austrian politician
- Franz Schürer (1900–1973), German politician
- Fredrik Schürer (1765–1836), Swedish artist
- Friedrich Schürer (1881–1948), German submarine designer
- Friedrich Schürer von Waldheim (1866–1935), Austrian physician
- Fritz Schürer-Waldheim (1896–1991), Austrian surgeon
- Gabriel Schürrer (born 1971), Argentine footballer and manager
- Gerhard Schürer (1921–2010), German politician
- Hans Schürer (1911–1996), German photographer
- Helmut Schürer (1920–2005), German painter
- Johann Georg Schürer (c. 1720–1786), German composer
- Kevin Schürer (born 1957), British historian, genealogist and statistician
- Lisa Schurer Lambert, American professor
- Lothar Schürer (born 1928), German footballer
- Mathias Schurer (1470–1520), French painter
- Max Schürer (1910–1997), Swiss astronomer geodestist and mathematician
- Max Schürer von Waldheim (1872–1948), Swedish soldier and writer
- Neal Schuerer (born 1954), American politician
- Oskar Schürer (1892–1949), German art historian, writer and university teacher
- Ulrich Schürer (born 1947), German zoologist
- Wilhelm Schürer (1886–1975), German architect

== See also ==
- 2429 Schürer, main-belt asteroid
