= Van Schoor =

van Schoor is a Dutch, Flemish and Afrikaans topographic surname meaning "from shoreland" or a toponymic surname derived from any places named Schoor or Schore. Notable people with the surname include:

- Chevandré van Schoor (born 1992), South African rugby union player
- HP van Schoor, South African rugby union player
- Ineke Van Schoor (born 1995), Belgian acrobatic gymnast
- Karl Van Schoor (1925–????), Belgian chess player
- Lodewijk van Schoor (c.1650–1702), Flemish painter, draughtsman and designer of tapestries
- Louis van Schoor (1951–2024), South African serial killer
- M.C.E. van Schoor (1920–2009), South African writer and historian
- Melt van Schoor Hamman or Melt Hamman, South African politician
- Melt van Schoor (born 1967), Namibian cricketer
- Raymond van Schoor (1990–2015), Namibian cricketer
- Ryk van Schoor (1921–2009), South African rugby union player

== See also ==
- Schor, Schore, Schoor/van Schoor, Schorr, Shor, Shore, Shorr, Schur
