= Shore (disambiguation) =

A shore is the fringe of land at the edge of a large body of water.

Shore may also refer to:

== People ==
- Bernard Shore (1896–1985), English viola player and author.
- Charles John Shore, 2nd Baron Teignmouth (1796–1885), British conservative politician
- David Shore (born 1959), Canadian script writer and producer, best known for writing and directing the T.V. series House
- Devin Shore (born 1994), Canadian ice hockey player
- Dinah Shore (1916–1994), American actress and singer
- Eddie Shore (1902–1985), Canadian professional ice hockey player
- Ernie Shore (1891–1980), American baseball player
- Frederick John Shore (1799–1837), British official in the East India Company
- Howard Shore (1946– ), Canadian composer, best known for composing the scores for The Lord of the Rings
- Jane Shore (1445–1527), one of the many mistresses of King Edward IV of England
- Jemima Shore, a fictional journalist featured in several crime novels by Antonia Fraser
- John Shore (trumpeter) (1662–1752), an English trumpeter and the inventor of the tuning fork
- John Shore, 1st Baron Teignmouth (1751–1834), British official in the East India Company
- Mitzi Shore (née Saidel; 1930–2018), who owned The Comedy Store, mother of Pauly
- Pauly Shore (1968– ), American actor and comedian
- Peter Shore (1924–2001), a British Labour politician noted for his opposition to the European Community
- Ryan Shore (1974– ), Canadian film composer and saxophonist
- S. Frank Shore (born 1935), American politician from Maryland
- Sammy Shore (1927–2019), a comedian, who founded The Comedy Store, father of Pauly
- Simon Shore (1959– ), British television and film director and writer
- Stephen Shore (1947– ), American photographer known for his pioneering use of color in art photography
- Viola Brothers Shore (1890–1970), American author

== Arts, entertainment, and media ==
- Shore (album), a 2020 album by Fleet Foxes
- The Shore (band), an American rock group, or their 2004 album
- The Shore (2011 film), a live-action short film
- The Shore (1984 film), a Soviet-German romance film
- "The Shore", a Ray Bradbury story published in The Martian Chronicles (October 2002/2033)
- The Shore (video game), a 2021 Lovecraftian horror adventure video game
- "Shore", a song by Andy Hawkins from Halo, 1994

== Other uses ==
- Shoring, supporting a structure in order to prevent collapse so that construction can proceed
- Sydney Church of England Grammar School, also known as the Shore School
- Two locations in England named Shore, in Greater Manchester and West Yorkshire

== See also ==
- Shoreline (disambiguation)
- Jersey Shore (disambiguation)
- Schor, Schore, Schoor/van Schoor, Schorr, Shor, Shore, Shorr, Schur
