= Schorr =

Schorr is a German topographic surname originating from the Middle High German word for rock or some rocky formation. Notable people with the surname include:

- Avraham Schorr, American rabbi
- Bill Schorr, American cartoonist
- Daniel Schorr (1916–2010), American journalist
- Eva Schorr (1927–2016), German painter and composer
- Friedrich Schorr (1888–1953), Hungarian-Austrian opera singer, chazzan
- Gedalia Schorr (1910–1979), American rabbi and philosopher
- Israel Schorr (1886–1935) Poland-born chazzan
- Michael Schorr, American rock drummer
- Mike Schorr, fictional character in Wonder Woman comics
- Moses Schorr (1874–1941), rabbi, Polish historian, Bible scholar, orientalist
- Renen Schorr (1952–2025), Israeli film director, screenwriter, film producer
- Richard Schorr (1867–1951), German astronomer
- Sari Schorr, American blues rock singer and songwriter
- Sebastian Schorr (born 1989), German politician
- Todd Schorr (born 1954), American pop surrealist painter

== See also ==
- Schorr (crater), a crater on the far side of the Moon, named after Richard Schorr
- Schor, Schore, Schoor/van Schoor, Schorr, Shor, Shore, Shorr, Schur
