= Schore =

Schore may refer to:

- Schore, Belgium, a village near Middelkerke
- Schore, Netherlands, a village in Zeeland
- Allan Schore, an American neuropsychologist
- Neil E. Schore, an American chemist

== See also ==
- Schor, Schore, Schoor/van Schoor, Schorr, Shor, Shore, Shorr, Schur
