= Shorr (surname) =

Shorr is a surname. Notable people with the surname include:

- Eliot Shorr-Parks (born 1986), American journalist and sports radio personality
- Flori Gough Shorr (1905–1992), American cellist
- Harriet Shorr, American artist, writer, poet and professor
- Isaac Shorr, American immigration lawyer
- Kalie Shorr (born 1994), American singer-songwriter
- Karly Shorr (born 1994), American snowboarder
- Kehat Shorr (1919–1972), Israeli shooting coach, Munich massacre victim
- Lester Shorr, American cinematographer
- Richard Shorr, American sound editor
- Shannon Shorr (born 1985), American poker player

== See also ==
- Schor, Schore, Schoor/van Schoor, Schorr, Shor, Shore, Shorr, Schur
