= Schoor =

Schoor is a German and Dutch surname. From it, a Dutch patronymic surname Schoorstra is derived. Notable people with the surname include:

- Gene Schoor (1914–2000), American writer
- Jens Schoor (born 1987), German squash player
- Wolfgang Schoor (1926–2007), German composer

== See also ==
- Schor, Schore, Schoor/van Schoor, Schorr, Shor, Shore, Shorr, Schur
