= Spiral arm =

Regions of enhanced brightness in spiral galaxies

The Whirlpool Galaxy (M51) has a pronounced spiral structure

Spiral arms are a defining feature of spiral galaxies. They manifest as spiral-shaped regions of enhanced brightness within the galactic disc. Typically, spiral galaxies exhibit two or more spiral arms. The collective configuration of these arms is referred to as the spiral pattern or spiral structure of the galaxy.

The appearance of spiral arms is quite diverse. Grand design spiral galaxies exhibit a symmetrical and distinct pattern, comprising two spiral arms that extend throughout the galaxy. In contrast, the spiral structure of flocculent galaxies comprises numerous small fragments of arms that are not connected to each other. The appearance of spiral arms varies across the electromagnetic spectrum.

In addition to increased brightness, spiral arms are characterised by an increased concentration of interstellar gas and dust, bright stars and star clusters, active starburst, a bluer colour, and an enhanced magnetic field strength in galaxies. The contribution of spiral arms to the total galaxy luminosity can reach 40–50% for some galaxies. The characteristics of spiral arms are correlated with other properties of galaxies, for example, the twist angle of spiral arms is related to parameters such as the mass of the supermassive black hole at the centre and the contribution of the bulge to the total luminosity.

Two main theories have been proposed to explain the origin of spiral arms: the stochastic self-propagating star formation model and the density wave theory. These theories describe different variants of the spiral structure and do not exclude each other. In addition to these theories, there are other theories that can explain the appearance of spiral structure in some cases.

The spiral structure was first identified in 1850 by Lord Rosse in the galaxy M51. The nature of spiral structure in galaxies remained unresolved for a considerable period of time.

== General characteristics ==
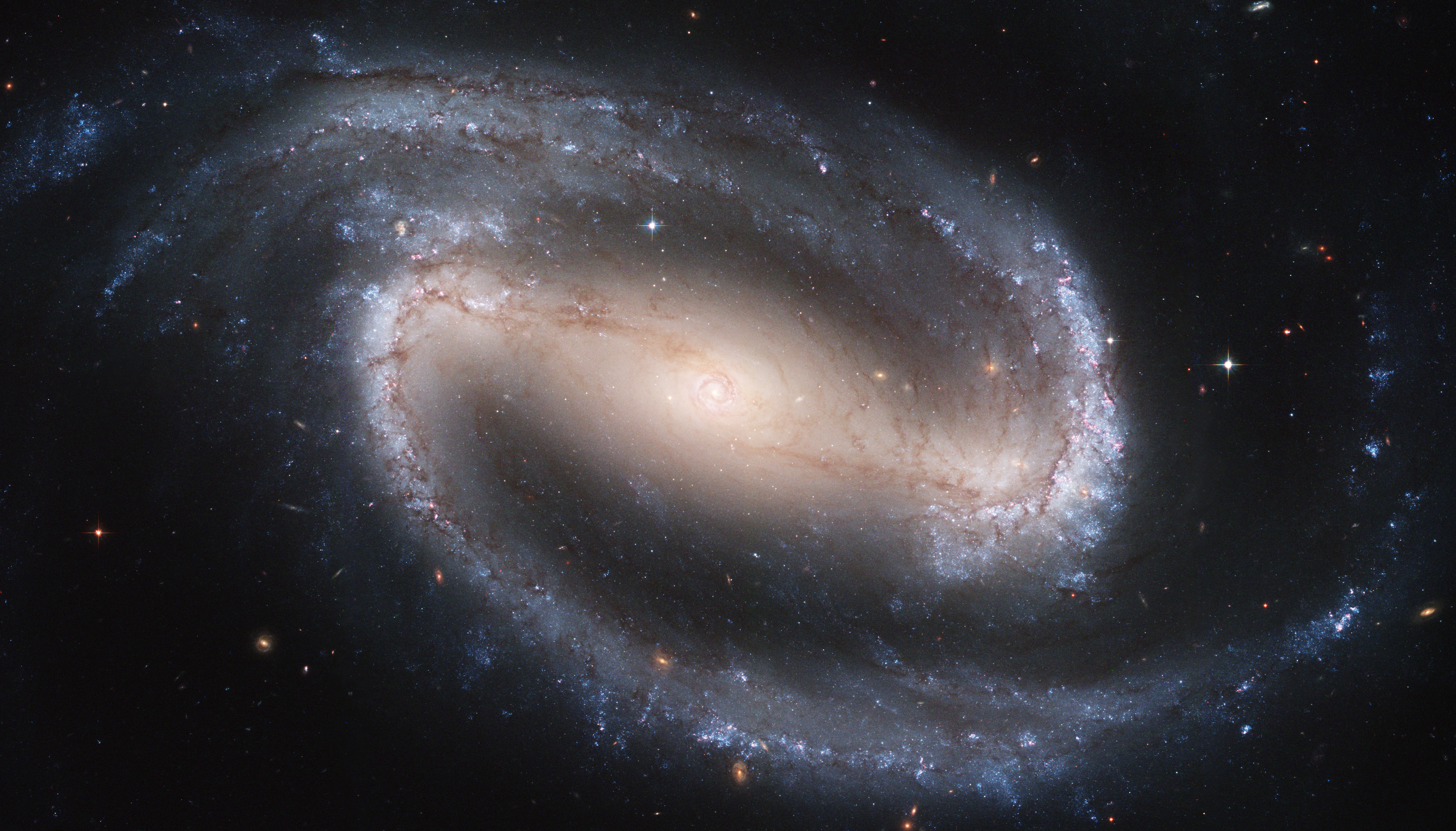
NGC 1300 is a spiral galaxy with a pronounced bar

Spiral arms are a defining feature of the structural composition of spiral galaxies, which are situated within discs and exhibit heightened brightness relative to their surrounding environment. Such structures take the form of spirals, which in unbarred galaxies usually originate from a region near the centre of the galaxy, whereas in barred galaxies they originate at the ends of the bar. The spiral arms do not extend over the entire radius of the disc and cease at the distance at which the disc can still be discerned. A galaxy typically comprises two or more spiral arms. The collective configuration of these arms within a galaxy is referred to as a spiral pattern or spiral structure.

Around two thirds of all massive galaxies are spiral galaxies. Spiral arms have been observed in galaxies at redshifts up to $z \approx 1$, and on occasion even at greater distances, which corresponds to a time when the age of the Universe was less than half of the present one. This suggests that the spiral structure is a long-lived phenomenon.

The spiral arms exhibit considerable variation in their appearance. In general, they are characterized by an increased concentration of gas and dust, active starburst, and a greater prevalence of star clusters, H II regions, and bright stars than in the remainder of the disk. While spiral arms are primarily identifiable due to their young stellar population, there also exists an increased concentration of old stars within them.

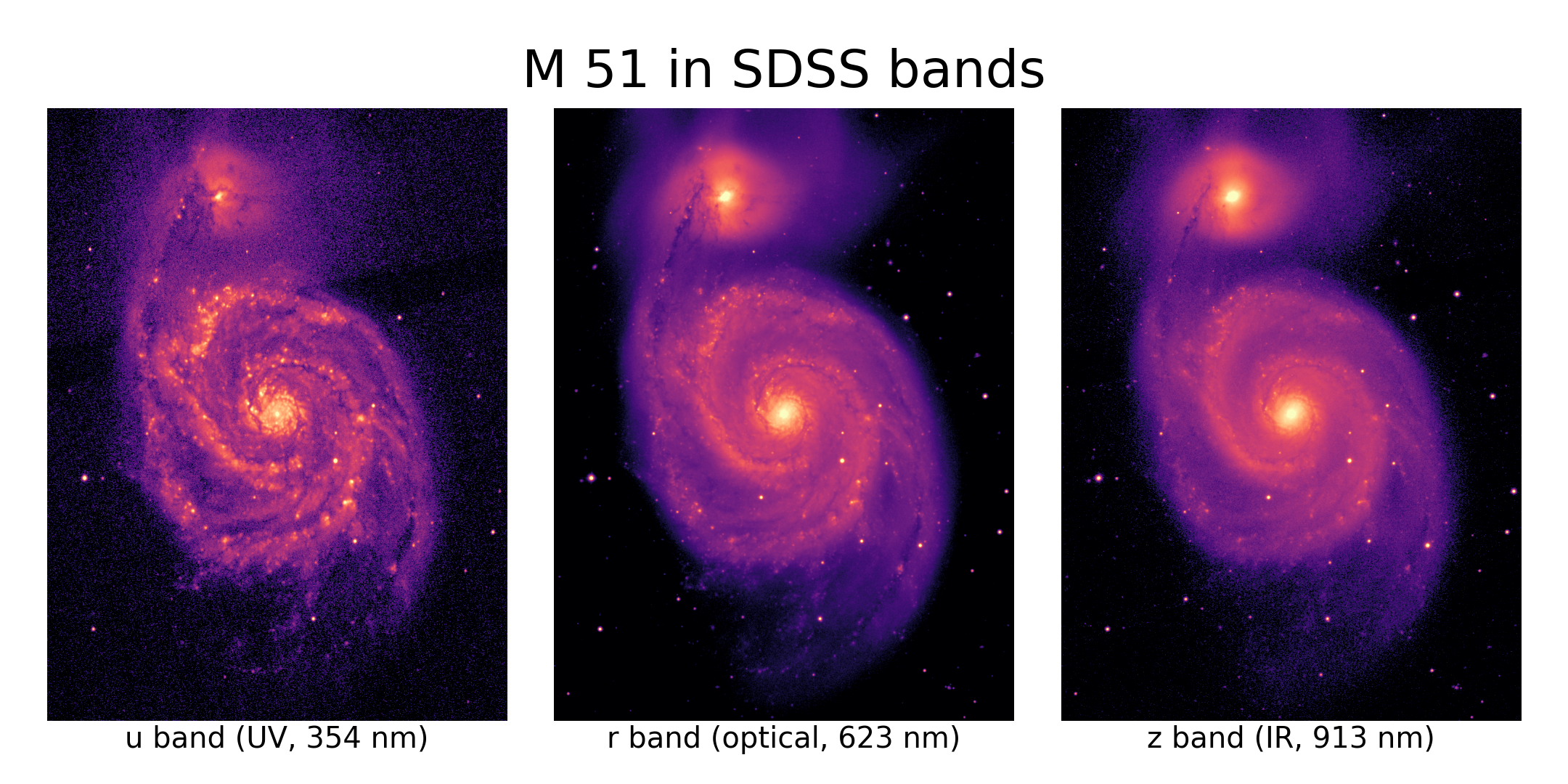
Images of M 51 in the SDSS in three photometric bands: from left to right are bands u (ultraviolet), r (visible) and z (infrared)

The appearance and expression of spiral branches in a galaxy may vary depending on the part of the electromagnetic spectrum in which it is observed. In the blue and ultraviolet parts of the spectrum, the spiral arms are well defined due to the presence of blue supergiants. In the red and near-infrared, older stars contribute more, which makes the spiral arms appear smoother, but less contrasted. Radiation from interstellar dust makes the spiral arms bright in the far infrared, while radiation from neutral hydrogen and molecules makes them bright at radio band. The greatest contrast and amount of fine detail in spiral arms can be seen when observed in emission spectral lines produced by emission nebulae, as well as in polyaromatic hydrocarbon lines produced by cold gas clouds.

The appearance of spiral arms is one of the criteria for galaxy morphological classification. For example, in Hubble's classification scheme, spiral galaxies are divided into types Sa, Sb, Sc. Barred spiral galaxies are divided into types SBa, SBb and SBc. The spiral arms of early type Sa and SBa galaxies are tightly wound and smooth, while those of late type Sc and SBc galaxies are knotty and loosely wound. Types Sb and SBb exhibit intermediate characteristics.

Spiral galaxies of different morphological types in the SDSS<ref>Buta (2011, pp. 129, 167)</ref>

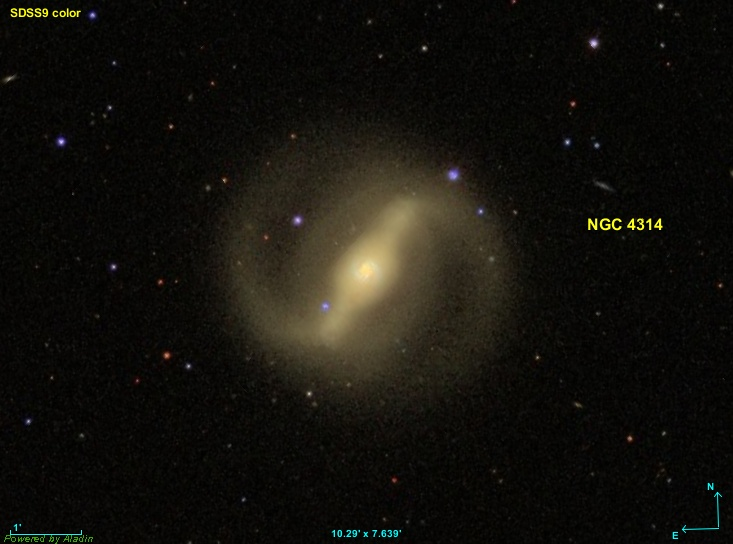
NGC 4314 (SBa)

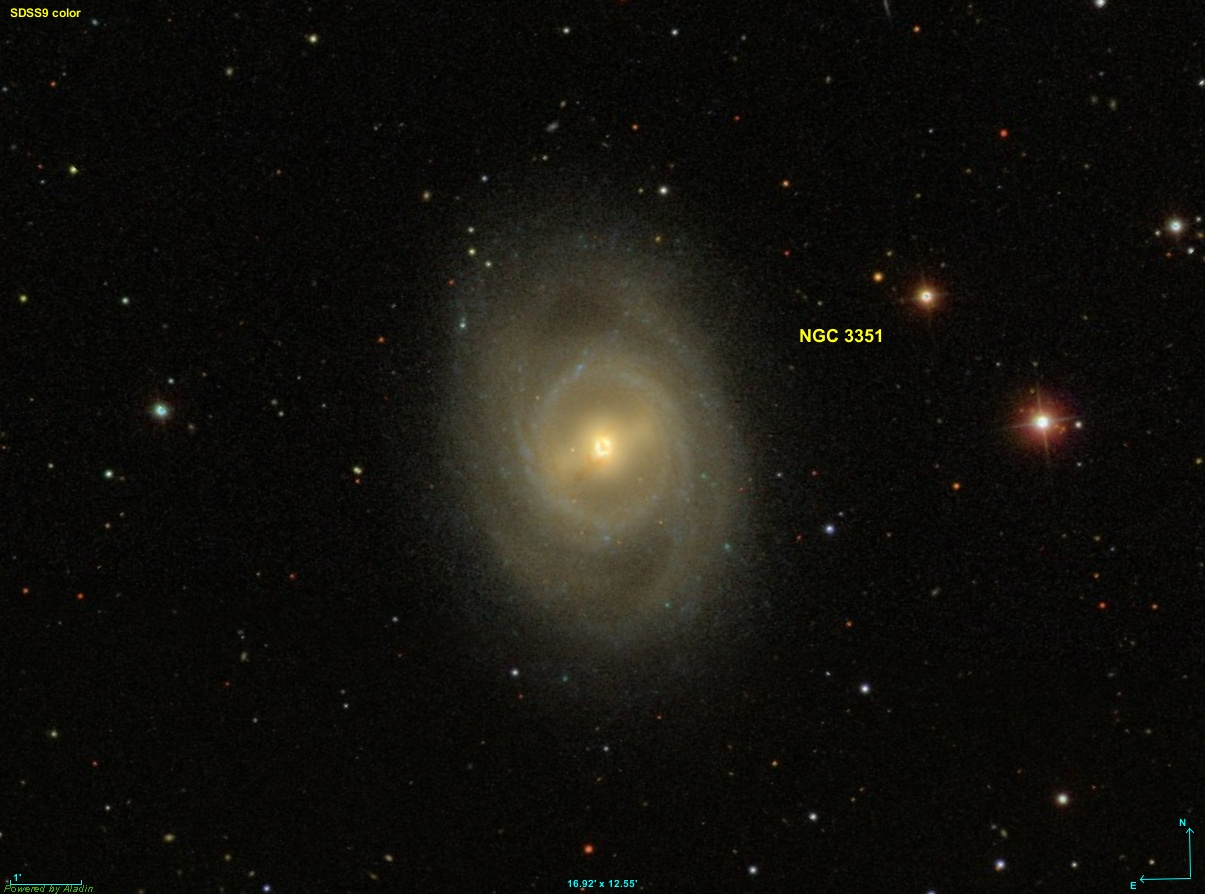
M95 (SBb)

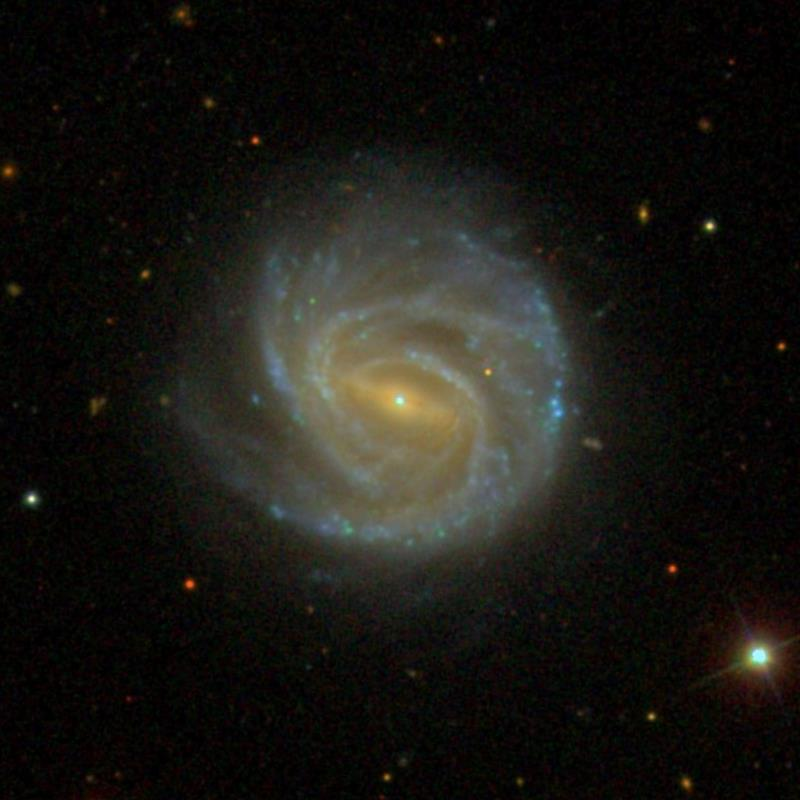
NGC 3367 (SBc)

=== Morphology ===
The spiral structure of galaxies exhibits considerable diversity in appearance. Grand design spiral galaxies exhibit a symmetrical and clear pattern comprising two spiral arms that extend throughout the galaxy. They account for 10% of the total number of spiral galaxies. In contrast, the spiral structure of flocculent galaxies consists of numerous small fragments of arms that are not connected to each other. Among spiral galaxies, the fraction of such galaxies is equal to 30%.

The remainder of the galaxies are of an intermediate type, referred to as "multi-armed", which exhibit the properties of both the flocculent and grand design galaxies. For example, they may appear to be grand design galaxies, yet possess more than two arms. Alternatively, they may exhibit a more ordered two-arm structure in the interior, which becomes irregular at the periphery. Nevertheless, in almost all cases, both types of structure are present in the spiral structure. Even grand design galaxies have details that do not fit into the spiral pattern. Additionally, there are galaxies that exhibit different types of spiral structure when observed across different spectral ranges. The distinction between the two main types of spiral arms appears to be related to fundamental physical differences between them.

Galaxies with different spiral structure morphology<ref>Ann, H.B.; Lee, H-R. (2013-06-01). "Spiral Arm Morphology of Nearby Galaxies". Journal of the Korean Astronomical Society. 46 (3). Seoul: Korean Astronomical Society: 141–149. Bibcode:2013JKAS...46..141A. doi:10.5303/JKAS.2013.46.3.141. ISSN 1225-4614.</ref>

M81, a grand design spiral galaxy

M101, a multi-armed spiral galaxy

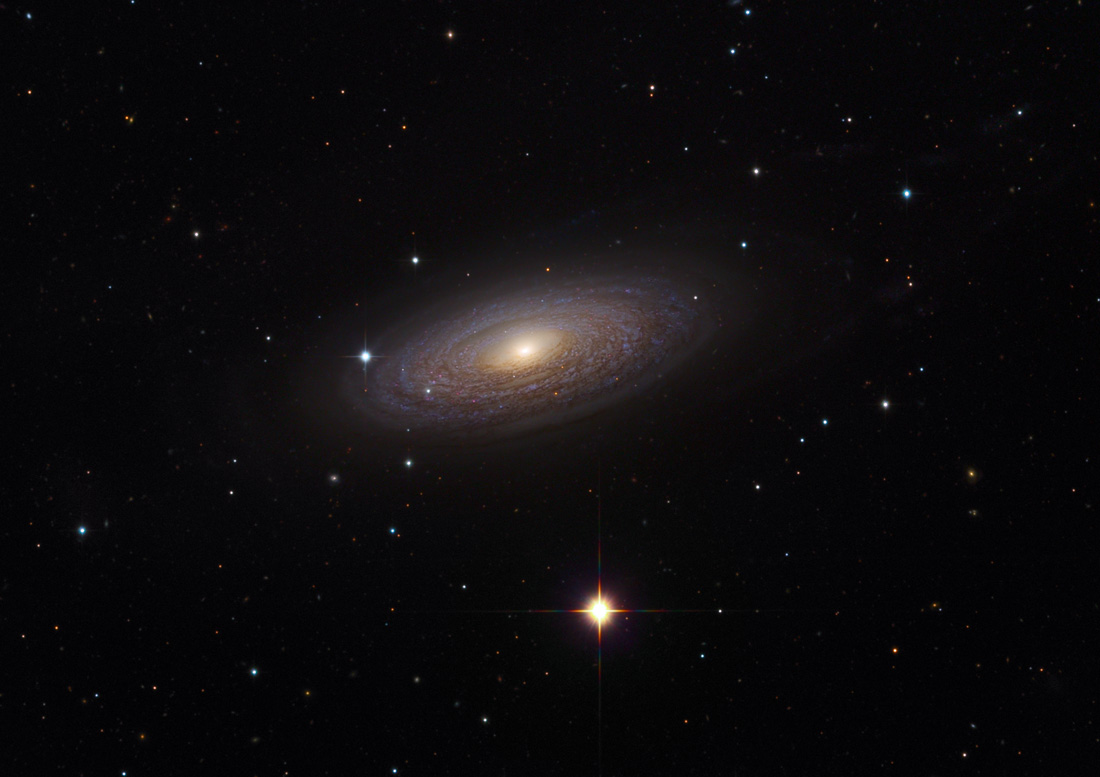
NGC 2841, a flocculent spiral galaxy

Additionally, spiral arms are subdivided into two categories: massive and filamentary. In the first instance, the spiral arms are wide, diffuse, and do not contrast significantly with the space between them. In contrast, in the second instance, the spiral arms are narrow and clearly defined.

Galaxies with different spiral structure morphology<ref>Buta (2011, p. 34)</ref>

M101 has filamentary arms

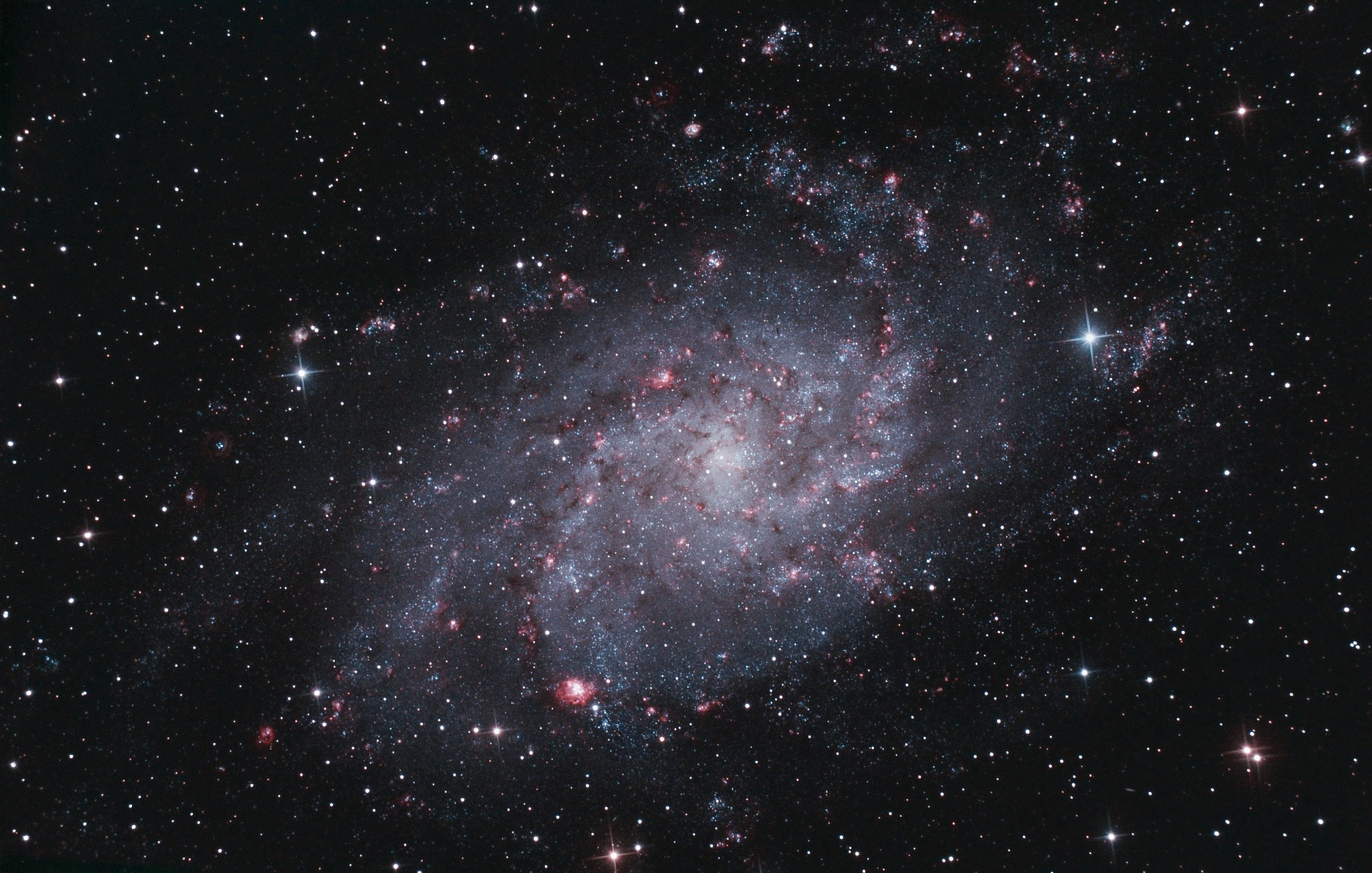
M33 has massive arms

=== Shape and pitch angle ===
Pitch angle of the spiral arm $\mu$

The shape of the arm is usually parameterised by the pitch angle $\mu$. The pitch angle is the angle between the tangent to spiral arm at a given point and the perpendicular to the radius drawn to that point. In the majority of spiral galaxies, the average pitch angle lies within the range of 5° to 30°. Spiral arms with a small pitch angle are called tightly wound, while those with a larger pitch angle are called open.

The shape of spiral arms is often described in a simplified manner as a logarithmic spiral. However, spiral arms may also be described as an Archimedean or hyperbolic spiral. In the case of the logarithmic spiral, the pitch angle is constant. It decreases with increasing distance from the centre in the Archimedean spiral and increases in the hyperbolic spiral. The measurements of twist angles in galaxies indicate that only a minority of spiral galaxies have pitch angles of the arms that are close to constant. More than two-thirds of galaxies have pitch angles that vary by more than 20%. The average twist angle is found to correlate with a number of different galaxy parameters. For example, the spiral arms of galaxies with brighter bulges tend to be wound tighter.

Several galaxies for which measurements of the pitch angle were made, SDSS images (the obtained values of $\mu$ are given in brackets)

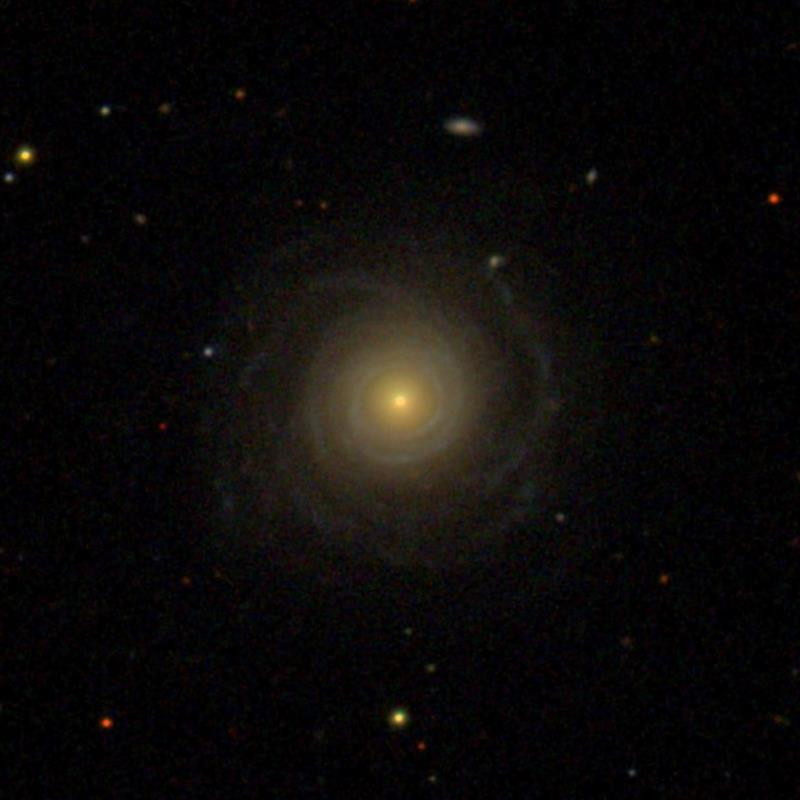
NGC 4977 ($\mu = 7.3^\circ$)

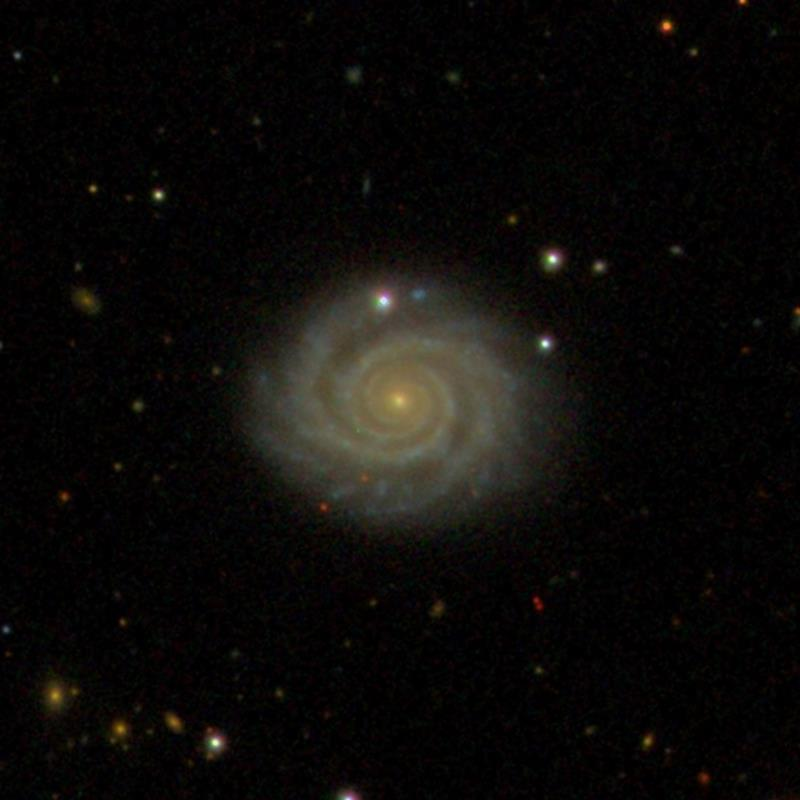
NGC 2649 ($\mu = 12.6^\circ$)

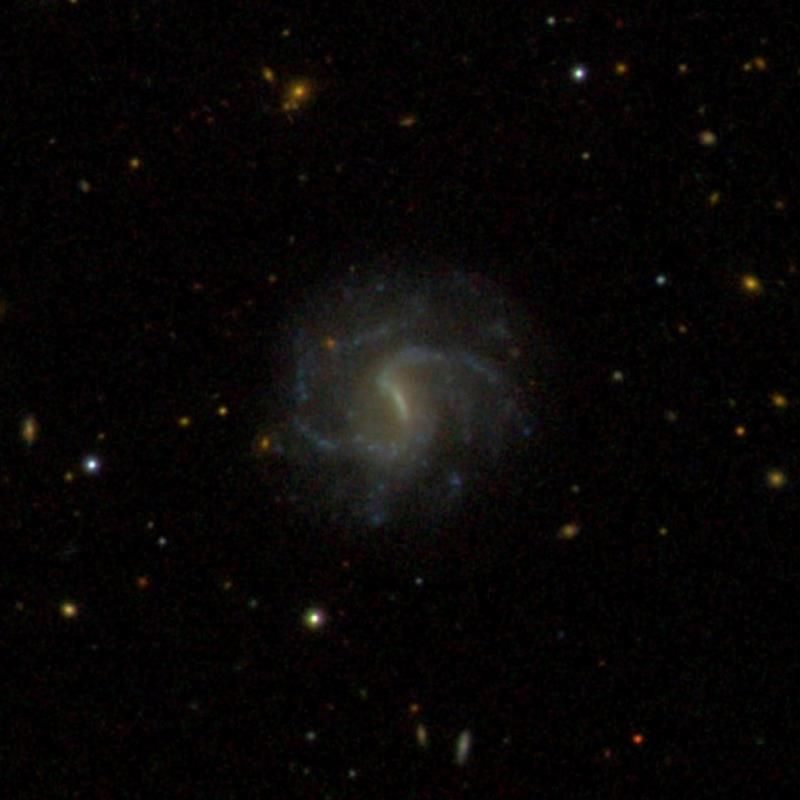
NGC 4195 ($\mu = 25.7^\circ$)

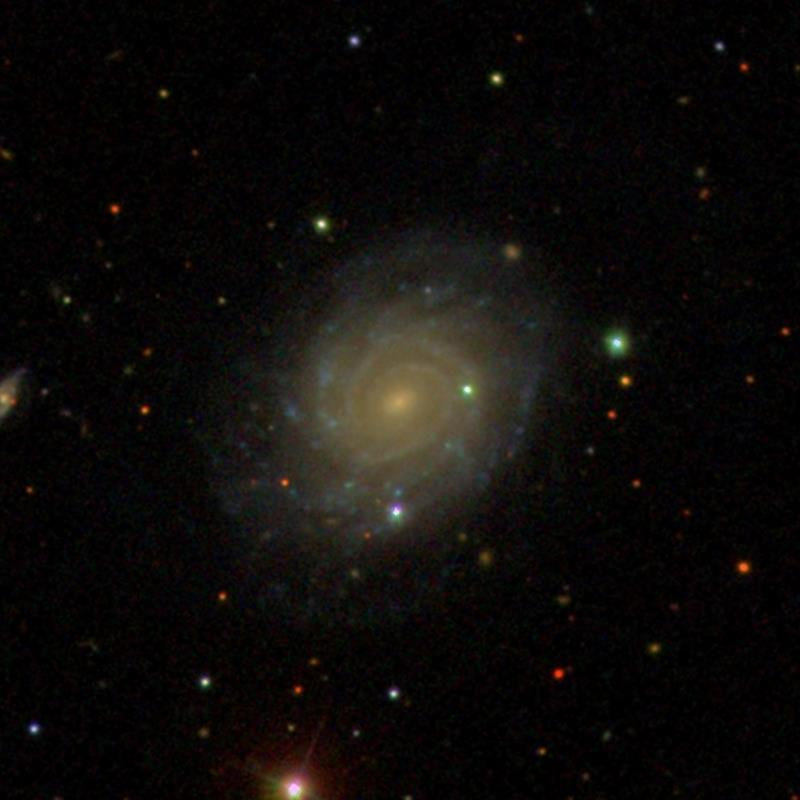
NGC 2575 ($\mu = 29.7^\circ$)

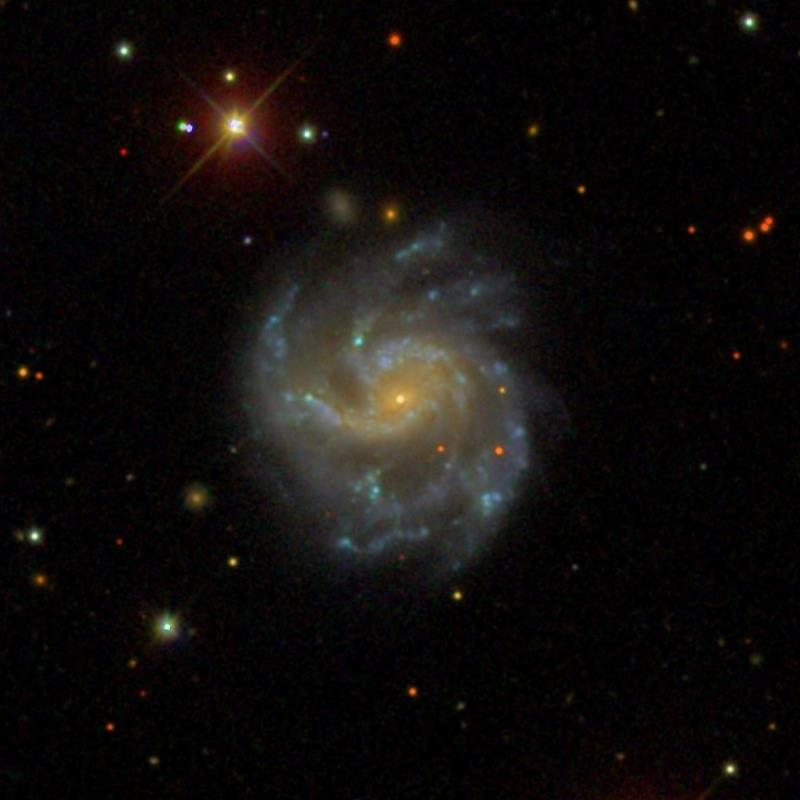
NGC 2532 ($\mu = 45.1^\circ$)

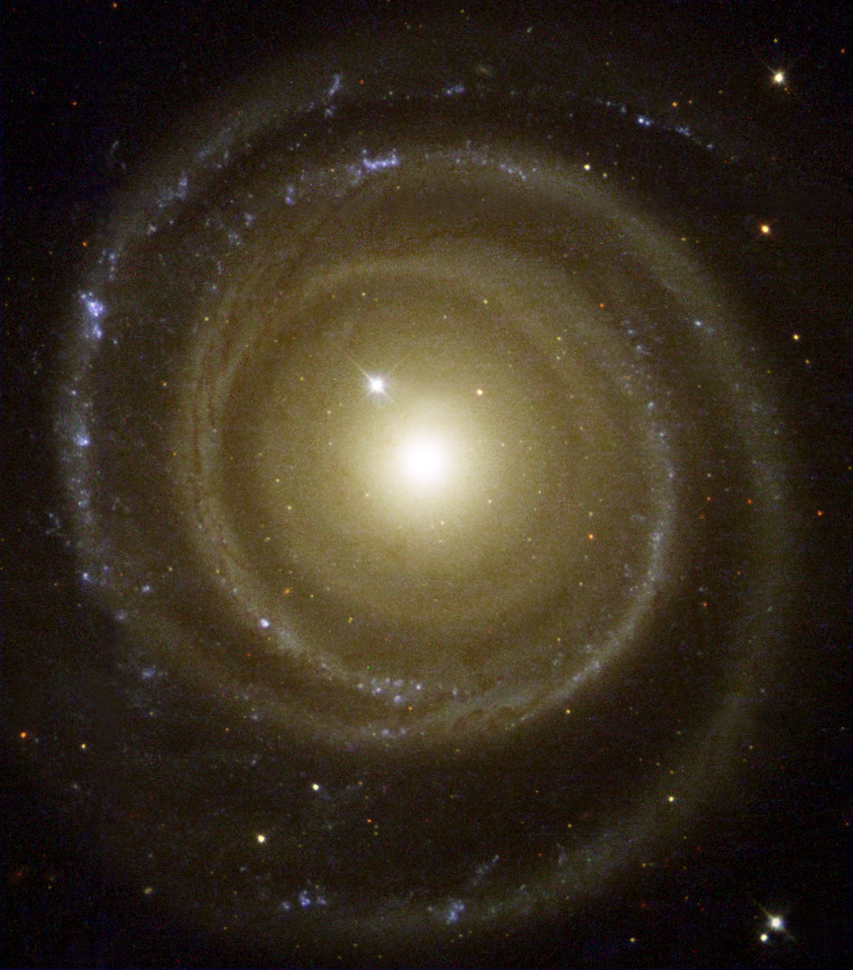
The spiral arms of the galaxy NGC 4622 pitch in different directions, indicating the presence of both leading and trailing spiral arms.

Spiral arms may additionally be categorized as either trailing or leading. In the case of trailing spiral arms, their outer tips point in the direction opposite to the direction of galaxy rotation. In the case of leading arms, their outer tips point in the same direction in which the galaxy rotates. In practice, it is challenging to ascertain whether the arms of a given galaxy are leading or trailing. To observe the spiral structure, the galaxy should not be tilted excessively towards the picture plane. However, a slight tilt is necessary to determine the direction of rotation. Additionally, the side of the galaxy closer to the observer needs to be identified. A review of the observational data indicates that the majority of galaxies exhibit trailing spiral arms, with leading arms being relatively uncommon. For instance, among the two hundred galaxies studied in this manner, only two may have leading arms. In some instances, galaxies exhibit both leading and trailing spiral arms, as exemplified by NGC 4622. Numerical simulations have demonstrated that leading spiral arms can emerge in specific circumstances. One such instance is when the dark matter halo rotates in opposition to the galaxy disk.

The width of spiral arms in the majority of galaxies increases with increasing distance from the centre. Grand design galaxies exhibit the greatest width of spiral arms.

=== Luminosity and colour ===
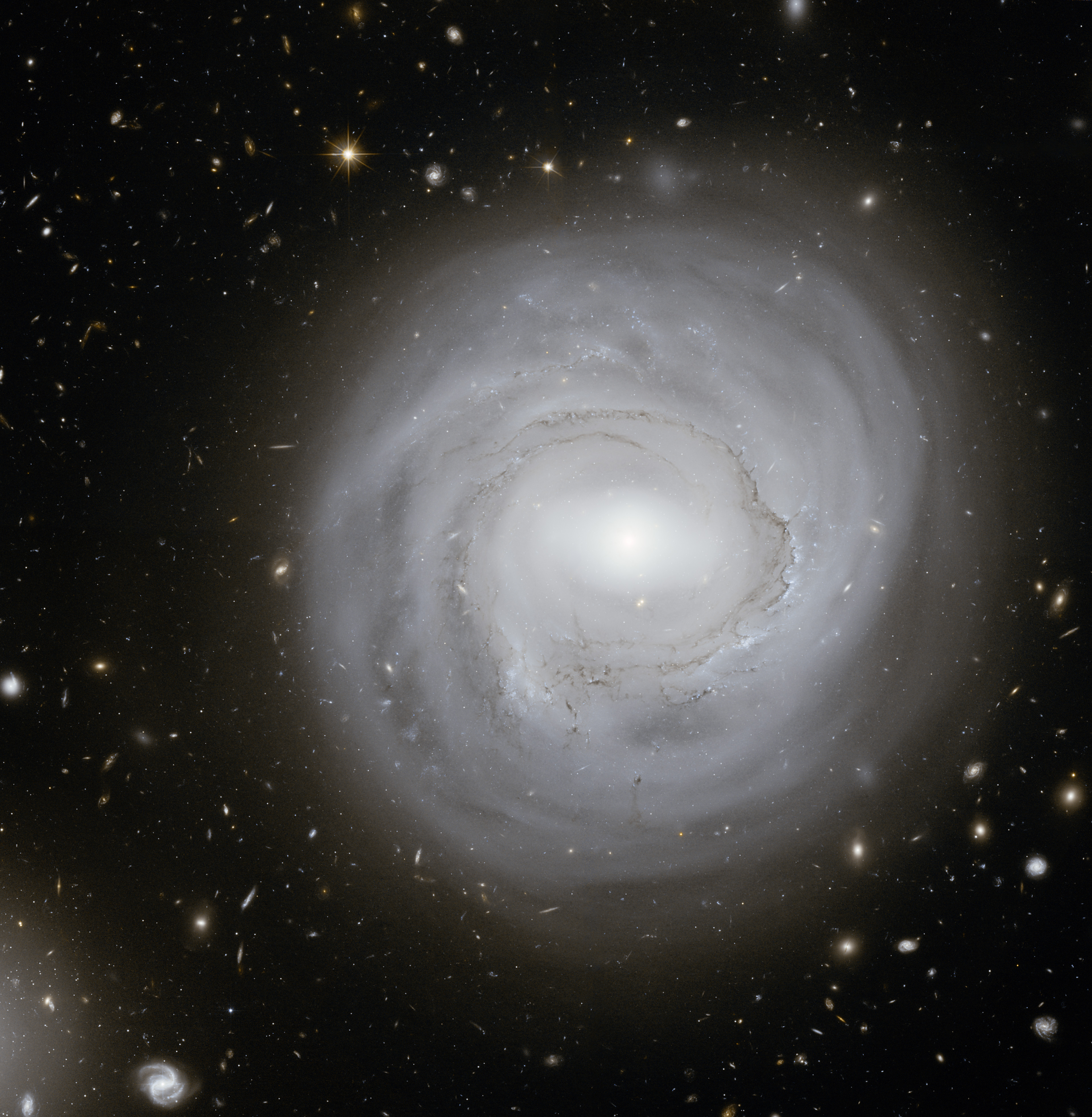
NGC 4921 – an anemic galaxy

The ratio of the luminosity of the spiral structure to the luminosity of the entire galaxy is greatest for grand design spiral galaxies. For these galaxies, this ratio is 21% on average, with some reaching as high as 40–50%. For flocculent and multi-arm galaxies, the ratio is 13% and 14%, respectively. Additionally, the proportion of spiral arms in the total luminosity increases in later morphological types. For Sa-type galaxies, this proportion averages 13%, while for Sc-type galaxies it averages 30%.

The colour of the spiral arms becomes increasingly blue for galaxies of late morphological types. The colour index g-r for Sc-type galaxies is approximately 0.3–0.4^{m}, while for Sa-type galaxies it is 0.5–0.6^{m}.

Additionally, there are anemic galaxies (anemic spirals). These galaxies are distinguished by a diffuse, faint spiral pattern, which is attributed to a reduced quantity of gas and, consequently, a diminished star formation rate in comparison to normal spiral galaxies of the same morphological type. Anemic galaxies are more prevalent in galaxy clusters. Apparently, the galaxies in these clusters are subject to ram pressure, which results in the rapid loss of gas. It is hypothesized that this type of galaxy may be in-between spiral and lenticular galaxies.

=== Magnetic field ===
Stronger magnetic fields are observed in the spiral arms than in the remainder of the galaxy. The average value of magnetic fields in spiral galaxies is 10 microgauss, while in their spiral arms it is 25 microgauss. In galaxies with a pronounced spiral pattern, the magnetic fields are orientated along the arms. However, in some cases, the magnetic field may form a separate spiral structure that runs in the space between the visible spiral arms. Conversely, magnetic fields can influence the movement of gas within the galaxy and contribute to the formation of spiral arms. However, they are insufficiently strong to play a dominant role in the formation of spiral arms.

=== Correlation between spiral arm parameters and other galaxy properties ===
The parameters of spiral arms correlate with other galaxy properties. For instance, it is established that galaxies with a greater pitch angle typically exhibit a lower mass of the supermassive black hole at their centre and a smaller galaxy mass in general. Additionally, their bulge contributes less to the total luminosity, they have a lower velocity dispersion in the centre, and their rotation curves appear to be more increasing. However, these dependencies are not particularly pronounced. Although the pitch angle of the spiral arms was originally introduced into the galaxy morphological classification as one of the classification criteria, subsequent analysis has revealed that this value correlates with the morphological type to a lesser extent than, for example, the indicator of the colour of the spiral arms. The correlation between the pitch angle and the aforementioned parameters can be theoretically explained. The described quantities are related to the mass distribution within the galaxy, which affects the manner in which the density wave propagates within the galaxy disc.

In more massive galaxies with a more ordered structure, spiral arms are observed to be more pronounced and contrasting. Additionally, the contrast between spiral arms is more pronounced in galaxies with a pronounced bar, although this correlation is relatively weak. In general, flocculent galaxies have a lower mass and a later morphological type than grand design galaxies.

== Spiral structure of the Milky Way ==
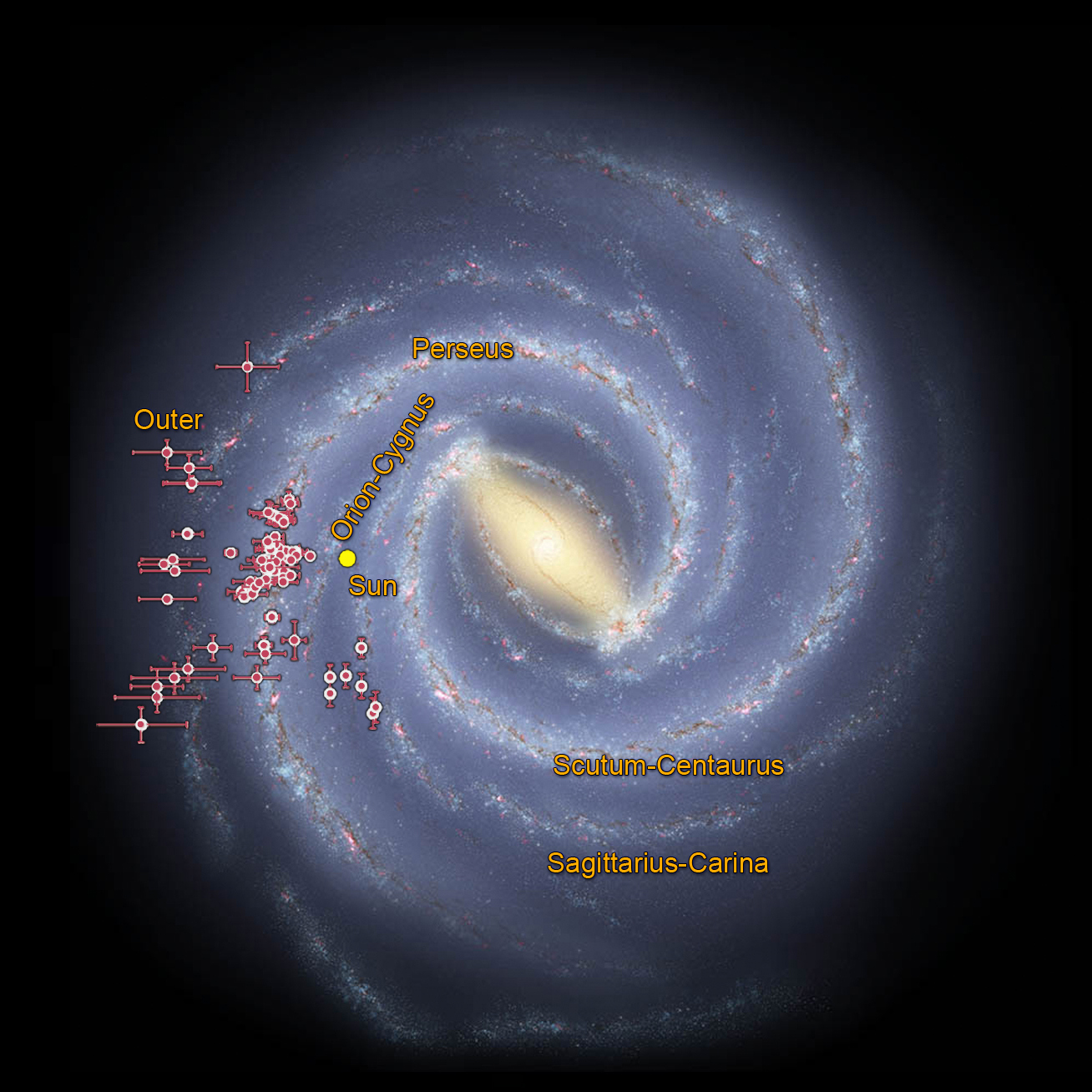
A model of the Milky Way. The yellow dot indicates the position of the Sun, the red dots the position of the embedded clusters, which serve as indicators of the spiral structure

It is challenging to ascertain the presence of spiral arms in the disc of our galaxy through optical observation, given that the Sun is situated within the plane of the Milky Way disc, and the light is being absorbed by interstellar dust. Nevertheless, spiral arms can be observed, for instance, when mapping the distribution of neutral hydrogen or molecular clouds.

The precise location, length, and number of spiral arms remain uncertain. However, the prevailing view is that the Milky Way contains four major spiral arms: two main ones – the Scutum–Centaurus and Perseus arms, and two secondary ones – the Norma and Sagittarius arms. Their pitch angle is approximately 12°, and their width is estimated at 800 parsecs. In addition to the large arms, smaller, similar formations, such as the Orion arm, are also distinguished.

== Theories on the spiral structure origin ==
The prevalence of spiral galaxies indicates that spiral structure is a long-lived phenomenon. However, since galaxies themselves rotate differentially rather than as solid bodies, any structure in the disc should curve significantly and disappear in approximately one to two revolutions. The two most prevalent solutions to this issue are the stochastic self-propagating star formation model (SSPSF) and the density wave theory, which describe disparate variants of the spiral structure. The first explanation posits that spiral arms are perpetually forming and dissipating without sufficient time to undergo significant twisting – such spiral arms are designated as material arms. The density wave theory posits that the spiral pattern is a density wave, thereby rotating independently of the disc as a solid body. Consequently, spiral arms are designated as wave arms. It is possible for these types of spiral arms to occur simultaneously within the same galaxy.

Tidal tails observed in interacting galaxies are also considered material spiral arms. Due to the low velocity of matter at a distance from the galaxy, tidal tails appear to persist for an extended period of time.

=== SSPSF model ===
Emergence of spiral arms in the SSPSF model

The SSPSF model posits that spiral arms emerge when starburst becomes active within a region of the galaxy. The presence of young, bright stars in this region has the effect of influencing the surrounding interstellar medium. For instance, a supernova explosion generates a shockwave in the gas, thereby facilitating the spread of star formation across the galactic disk. In a period of less than 100 million years, the brightest stars in this region have time to extinguish. This is less than the time required for one revolution of the galaxy. The differential rotation of this region allows it to stretch into a short arc. Given that starburst is a continuous process occurring in different regions of the disc, there are numerous such arcs at different times throughout the disc, which can be observed as a flocculent spiral pattern. Given that such spiral arms are only visible due to young stars, they have a minimal impact on the mass distribution within the galaxy and are rarely observed in the infrared.

=== Density wave theory ===
Schematic representation of colour gradients in spiral arms if they are density waves

In the context of density wave theory, spiral arms are understood to emerge when mechanical oscillations occur within a disc, giving rise to a density wave – the stars move within the disc in such a way that they converge in specific regions and become more concentrated. The density wave exerts a governing influence not only on the stars but also on the gas, thereby promoting a more active starburst in regions where the concentration of stars is higher. Concurrently, at various points in time, different stars emerge within the spiral arm, resulting in the density wave moving at a different speed than the stellar disc. Consequently, the density wave is not subject to twisting. The influence of this mechanism results in the formation of a large-scale, ordered spiral structure, which is also observed in the infrared. The concentration of stars in the spiral arm increases by a mere 10–20%, yet this relatively modest change in gravitational potential has a profound impact on the gas dynamics. The gas accelerates, and shock waves can occur in it, appearing as dark dust lanes in the arms.

It is challenging to confirm the presence of a density wave in practice. However, it is possible to do so, for instance, by detecting a specific corotation radius, which is a region where the spiral arm moves at the same speed as the stars. It can be identified by observing colour gradients within the arms. Since the stellar population forms within an arm and subsequently reddens over time, a colour gradient should be observed across the arm if its velocity differs from that of the arm. It is hypothesised that density waves are created and maintained by the bars of galaxies or by tidal force of their satellites.

The density wave theory postulates that only trailing spiral arms are stable, and that any leading structure must at some point transition into a trailing one. Concurrently, the structure itself is amplified for a period following the transformation, which is called swing amplification.

Influence of differential rotation on the structure of spiral arms (animation)

"Material" spiral arms twist greatly in a short amount of time

Density waves create arms that don't twist over time

=== Alternative theories ===
Some theories propose alternative mechanisms for the appearance of spiral arms that differ from the density wave theory and the SSPSF model. These theories are not intended to replace the aforementioned theories entirely, but rather to explain the appearance of spiral arms in specific cases. For instance, the manifold theory is applicable only to barred spiral galaxies. According to this theory, the gravitational influence of the bar causes the orbits of the stars to be arranged in a certain way, creating spiral arms and moving along them. The name of the theory is related to the fact that in this model the stars moving in spiral arms form a manifold in phase space. In contrast to the density wave theory, the manifold theory does not posit the emergence of colour gradients in spiral arms, which are in fact observed in numerous galaxies. The fact that in galaxies with a bar, spiral arms originate from a region proximate to the bar may suggest a correlation between these structures and the manifold theory. However, this is not the sole theory that explains the genesis of arms due to bars.

== Research history ==
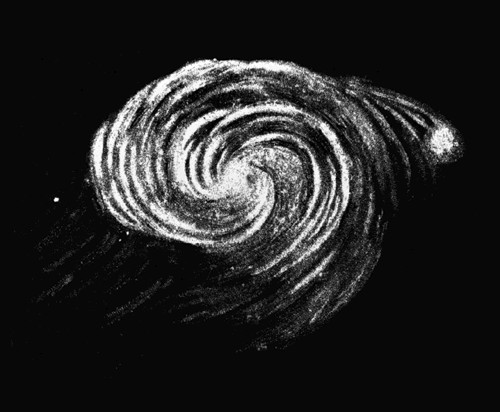
Sketch of the M51 by Lord Rosse

The spiral arms were first discovered in the Whirlpool Galaxy (M51), in which Lord Rosse identified the spiral structure in 1850.

In 1896, the problem of twisting was formulated. If spiral arms were material entities, due to differential rotation, they would twist very rapidly to the point where they would be impossible to observe. Consequently, the question of the nature of the spiral structure remained unresolved for a considerable period of time. Since 1927, this question has been addressed by Bertil Lindblad, who in 1961 correctly concluded that the spiral arms arise due to gravitational interaction between the stars in the disc. Subsequently, in 1964, Chia-Chiao Lin and Frank Shu proposed the theory that spiral arms can be conceptualised as density waves. The SSPSF model was first proposed in 1978, although the concept of a supernova explosion stimulating starburst in neighbouring regions was first proposed by Ernst Opik as early as 1953. This observation formed the basis of the subsequent theory.

In 1953, the distances to the various stellar associations in our galaxy were measured with a high degree of accuracy. This enabled the discovery of a spiral structure in the Milky Way.

The classification of galaxies into flocculent, multi-armed, and grand design categories is derived from a more complex morphological classification scheme involving 10 classes that describe the type of spiral pattern. The classification scheme was developed by Debra and Bruce Elmegreen in 1987. Subsequently, they proposed a simplified scheme, which is the one that is currently in use.

Despite the considerable successes of the density wave theory, the physical nature of spiral arms remains a topic of debate, with no clear consensus yet reached.

== Bibliography ==
- Buta, R. J. (2011). Oswalt, T. D.; Keel, W. C. (eds.). "Galaxy Morphology". Planets, Stars, and Stellar Systems. 6. New York: Springer Reference. arXiv:1102.0550. doi:10.1007/978-94-007-5609-0. ISBN 978-94-007-5609-0.
- Сурдин, В. Г. (2017). Галактики [Galaxies] (in Russian) (2, rev. and supplement ed.). Moscow, Russia: Физматлит. ISBN 978-5-9221-1726-5.
- Засов, А. В.; Постнов, К. А. (2011). Общая астрофизика [General Astrophysics] (in Russian) (2, revised and supplemented ed.). Fryazino: Век 2. ISBN 978-5-85099-188-3.
- Karttunen, H.; Kroger, P.; Oja, H.; Poutanen, M.; Donner, K. J. (2016). Fundamental Astronomy (6 ed.). Berlin, Germany; Heidelberg, Germany; N.Y.: Springer. ISBN 978-3-662-53045-0.
- Binney, J.; Merrifield, M. (1998). Galactic Astronomy. Princeton: Princeton University Press. ISBN 978-0-691-23332-1.
- Seigar, M. S. (2017). Spiral structure in galaxies. San Rafael, California: IOP Publishing. ISBN 978-1-6817-4609-8. OCLC 994877317.
