= NGC 1365 =

Galaxy in the constellation Fornax

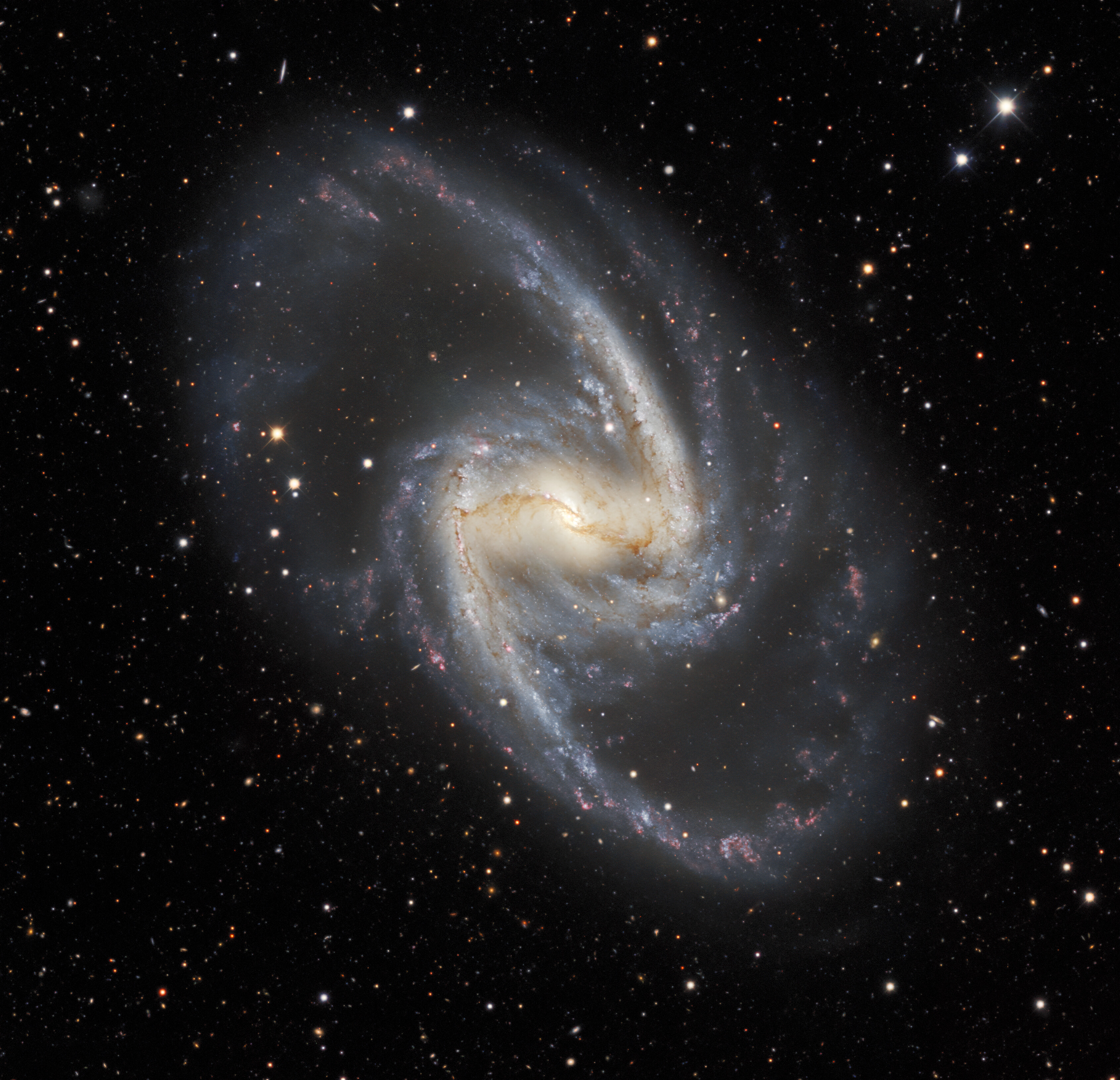
- NGC 1365 imaged by the Cerro Tololo Inter-American Observatory

Observation data (J2000 epoch)
- Constellation: Fornax
- Right ascension: 03^{h} 33^{m} 36.4071^{s}
- Declination: −36° 08′ 24.669″
- Redshift: 0.005457±0.000003
- Heliocentric radial velocity: 1,636±1 km/s
- Distance: 74 Mly (22.69 Mpc)h^{−1}_{0.6774} (Light-travel)
- Group or cluster: Fornax Cluster
- Apparent magnitude (V): 10.3

Characteristics
- Type: (R')SBb(s)b
- Size: 201,700 to 306,800 ly (61.85 to 94.08 kpc) (diameter; 2MASS K-band total and D_{25.5} B-band isophotes)
- Apparent size (V): 11.2′ × 6.2′

Other designations
- Great Barred Spiral Galaxy, ESO 358-G 017, NGC 1365, LEDA 13179, MCG -06-08-026, PGC 13179, VV 825

NGC 1365, also known as the Fornax Propeller Galaxy or the Great Barred Spiral Galaxy, is a double-barred spiral galaxy about 56 million light-years away in the constellation Fornax. It was discovered by Scottish astronomer James Dunlop on 2 September 1826.

== Characteristics ==
NGC 1365 is a large barred spiral galaxy in the Fornax Cluster. Within the larger long bar stretching across the center of the galaxy appears to be a smaller bar that comprises the core, with an apparent size of about 50″ × 40″. This second bar is more prominent in infrared images of the central region of the galaxy, and likely arises from a combination of dynamical instabilities of stellar orbits in the region, along with gravity, density waves, and the overall rotation of the disc. The inner bar structure likely rotates as a whole more rapidly than the larger long bar, creating the diagonal shape seen in images.

The spiral arms extend in a wide curve north and south from the ends of the east–west bar and form an almost ring-like Z-shaped halo. Astronomers think NGC 1365's prominent bar plays a crucial role in the galaxy's evolution, drawing gas and dust into a star-forming maelstrom and ultimately feeding material into the central black hole.

NGC 1365, including its two outer spiral arms, spreads over around 300,000 light-years. Different parts of the galaxy take different times to make a full rotation around the core of the galaxy, with the outer parts of the bar completing one circuit in about 350 million years. NGC 1365 and other galaxies of its type have come to more prominence in recent years with new observations indicating that the Milky Way could also be a barred spiral galaxy. Such galaxies are quite common — two thirds of spiral galaxies are barred according to recent estimates, and studying others can help astronomers understand our own galactic home.

== Supernovae ==
Four supernovae have been observed in NGC 1365:

- SN 1957C (type unknown, mag. 16.5) was discovered by Howard S. Gates on 19 October 1957.
- SN 1983V (Type Ic, mag. 13.5) was discovered by Robert Evans on November 25, 1983, and independently discovered by P. O. Lindblad and P. Grosbol on 27 November 1983.
- SN 2001du (Type II, mag. 14) was discovered by Robert Evans on 24 August 2001.
- SN 2012fr (Type Ia, mag. 14.7) was discovered by Alain Klotz on 27 October 2012.

== Supermassive black hole ==
The central supermassive black hole in the active nucleus, which has a mass of about 2 million solar masses or half the mass of the Milky Way's central black hole Sagittarius A*, rotates at close to the speed of light. These observations, announced in February 2013, were made using the X-ray telescope satellite NuSTAR.

== The location of NGC 1365 in the sky ==
As seen from Earth, the location of NGC 1365 is one and a half degrees eastward of Philip S. Harrington's STAR 2 which is a telescopic asterism in the shape of a triangle, composed of the stars χ (Chi) 1-2-3 Fornacis.

== See also ==
- NGC 1300
- NGC 1097
- List of NGC objects (1001–2000)
