= NGC 578 =

Galaxy in the constellation Cetus

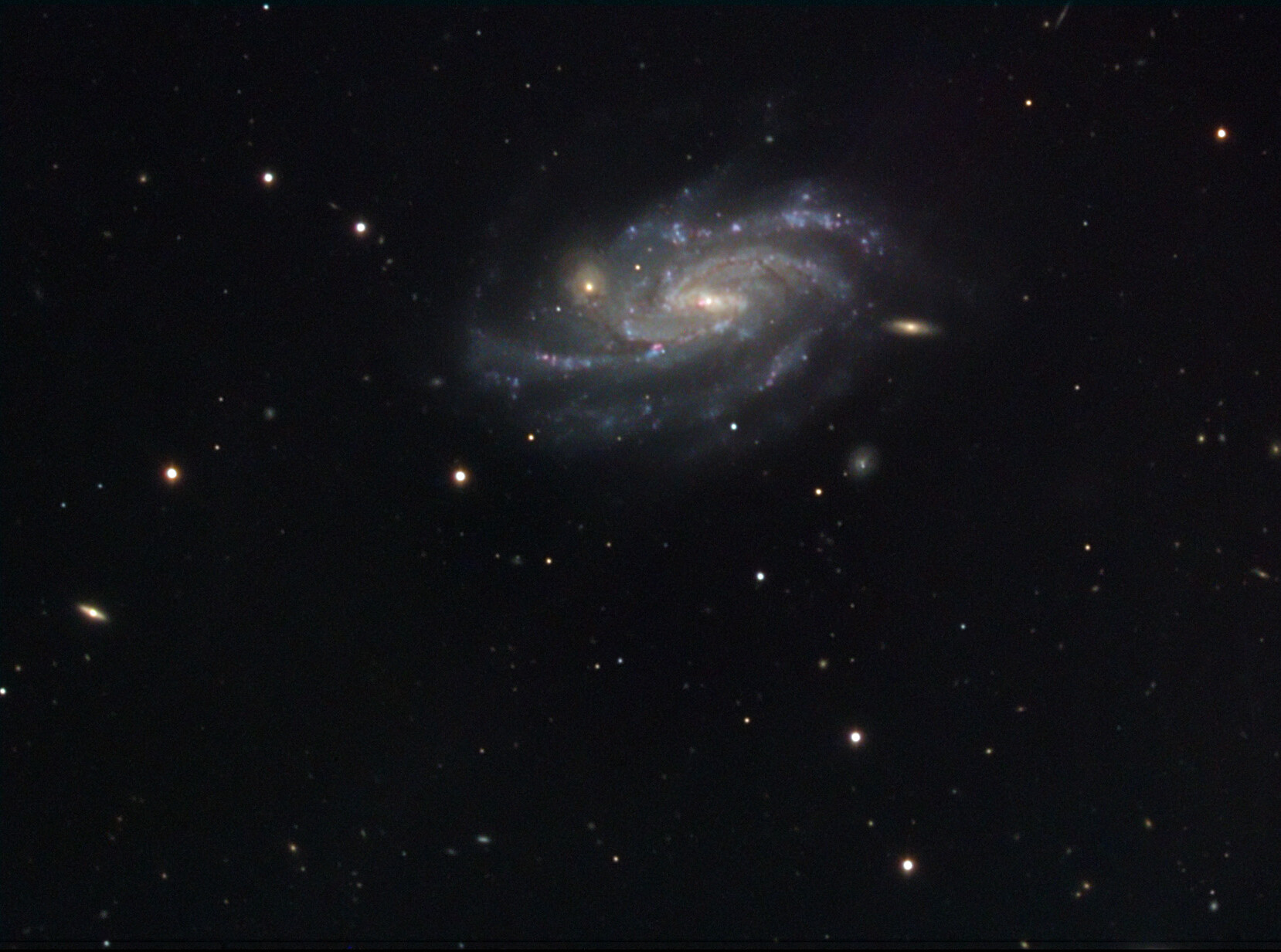
- NGC 578, image taken at Kitt Peak National Observatory

Observation data (J2000 epoch)
- Constellation: Cetus
- Right ascension: 01^{h} 30^{m} 28.5^{s}
- Declination: −22° 40′ 02″
- Redshift: 0.005434 ± 0.000005
- Heliocentric radial velocity: 1,629 ± 1 km/s
- Distance: 59.3 ± 15.7 Mly (18.2 ± 4.8 Mpc)
- Apparent magnitude (V): 10.8

Characteristics
- Type: SAB(rs)c
- Apparent size (V): 4.9′ × 3.1′

Other designations
- UGCA 18, ESO 476- G 015, AM 0128-225, MCG -04-04-020, IRAS 01280-2255, PGC 5619

NGC 578 is a spiral galaxy in the constellation Cetus. The galaxy lies about 60 million light years away from Earth, which means, given its apparent dimensions, that NGC 578 is approximately 110,000 light years across. It was discovered by John Herschel on November 11, 1835.

NGC 578 is a spiral galaxy with three arms. The bulge is small and slightly elliptical and has a prominent bar running at an east–west axis. From each end of the bar emerges a spiral arm with a very steep angle. After half a revolution the southeastern arm bifurcates while the northwest becomes diffuse. The third arm features more HII regions than the other arms and is more prominent at its outer portion. An unusual aspect of the galaxy is that the spiral arms appear to end at the corotation circle. A bright galaxy is visible superimposed to the east of the galaxy.

NGC 578 is the foremost galaxy in the NGC 578 group, which also includes galaxies 2MASX J01301192-2245448 and MBG 01272-2057.
