= Chi Fornacis =

Location of χ Fornacis (circled)

The Bayer designation Chi Fornacis (Chi For / χ Fornacis / χ For) can refer to three different unrelated stars in the constellation Fornax:

- χ^{1} Fornacis, (HD 21423), a young variable A-type main-sequence star
- χ^{2} Fornacis, (HD 21574), a suspected variable K-type giant
- χ^{3} Fornacis, (HD 21635), a binary star.

The lenticular galaxy NGC 1380 lies 2 degrees east-northeast of Chi^{2} Fornacis.
