= Grand design spiral galaxy =

Spiral galaxy with prominent and well-defined spiral arms

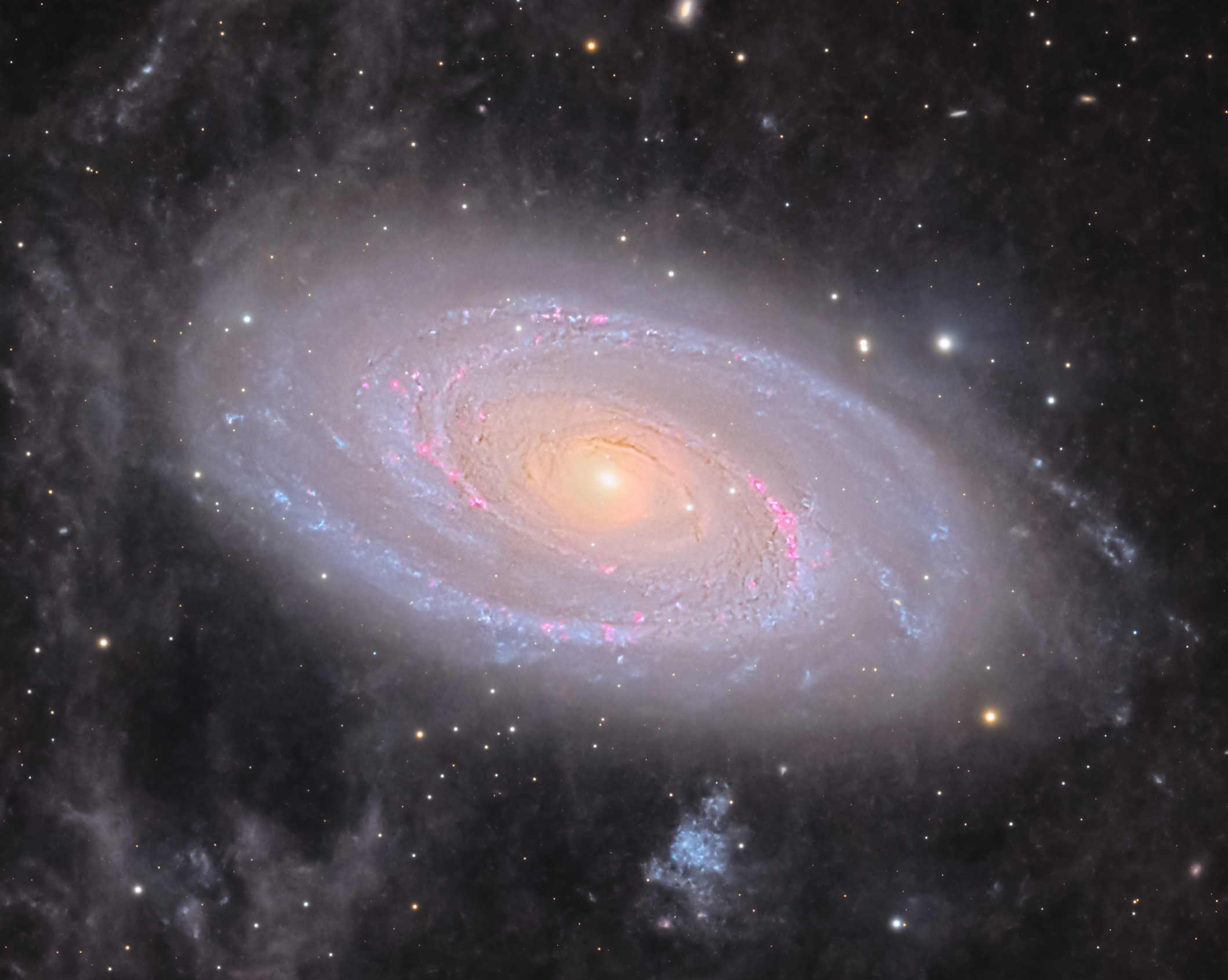
An image of Messier 81, a grand design spiral galaxy, with Integrated Flux Nebula.

A grand design spiral galaxy is a spiral galaxy with prominent and well-defined continuous spiral arms, as opposed to multi-arm, patchy and flocculent spirals which have subtler structural features. The spiral arms of a grand design galaxy extend clearly around the galaxy, covering a significant portion of the galaxy's circumference. These spiral arms host much star formation, making them home to an abundance of bright, hot, and short-lived massive stars.

As of 2002, approximately 10 percent of all currently known spiral galaxies are classified as grand design type spirals, including M51 (Whirlpool Galaxy), M74 (Phantom Galaxy), M81 (Bode’s Galaxy), M83 (Southern Pinwheel Galaxy), M101 (Pinwheel Galaxy), NGC 6946 (Fireworks Galaxy) and IC 342 (The Hidden Galaxy).

== Origin of structure ==
Density wave theory is the preferred explanation for the well-defined structure of grand design spirals, first suggested by Chia-Chiao Lin and Frank Shu in 1964. The term "grand design" was not used in this work, but appeared in the 1966 continuation paper; Lin (along with Yuan and Shu) is usually credited with the coining of the term.

According to the density wave theory, the spiral arms are created inside density waves that turn around the galaxy at different speeds from the stars in the galaxy's disk. Stars and gas are clumped in these dense regions due to gravitational attraction toward the dense material, though their location in the spiral arm may not be permanent. When they come close to the spiral arm, they are pulled toward the dense material by the force of gravity; and as they travel through the arm, they are slowed from exiting by the same gravitational pull. This causes the gas in particular to clump in the dense regions, which in turn causes gas clouds to collapse, resulting in star formation.
