= SSPSF model =

Model of star formation

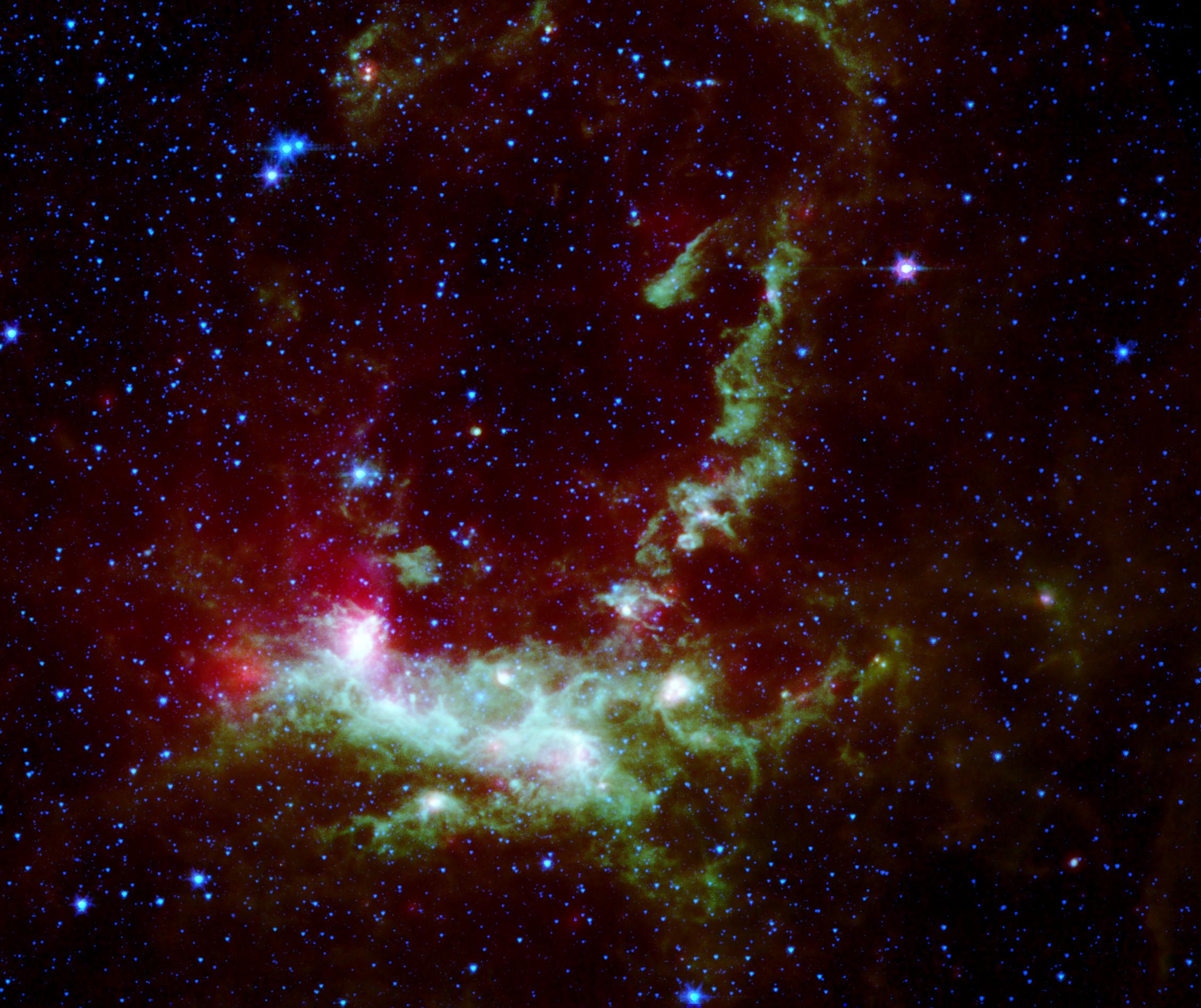
This image from NASA Spitzer Space Telescope shows the supernova remnant Henize 206, in which new stars heat the gas.

The SSPSF (stochastic self-propagating star formation) model of star formation was proposed by Mueller & Arnett in 1976, generalized afterward by Gerola & Seiden in 1978 and Gerola, Seiden, & Schulman in 1980. This model proposes that star formation propagates via the action of shock waves produced by stellar winds and supernovae traversing the gas that composes the interstellar medium.

The Henize 206 nebula provides a clear example. In particular, 24μ infrared (MIPS) emission shows where a new generation of stars heats the remains of the supernova remnant that induced their formation.

In contrast to star formation in density-wave theories, which are limited to disk-shaped galaxies and produce global spiral patterns, SSPSF applies equally well to spirals, to irregular galaxies and to any local concentrations of gas in elliptical galaxies.

SSPSF simulation

The effect may be envisioned as an "SIR infection model" in a differentially rotating disk, the host galaxy. The SIR model (perhaps most popularly familiar in the form of Conway's Game of Life) is applied to star formation propagating through the galaxy: Each generation of stars in a neighborhood includes some massive ones whose stellar winds and, soon, supernovae, produce shock waves in the gas (Susceptible material). These lead to collapsing nearby gas clouds, which produce the next generation of stars (Infection propagation); but in the immediate neighborhood, all initially available gas is used, so no further stars are born there for some period of time despite the shocks (Recovery from infection).

In a non-flattened galaxy, the infection would produce an outward propagating sphere. In a non-rotating flattened (disk) environment, the infection would produce an outward propagating ring. But in a differentially rotating flattened environment, i.e., with mass closer to the galactic center orbiting the center somewhat more quickly, the ring is sheared into an ellipse, the innermost parts moving ahead of the ring's center and the outermost parts lagging. For disk galaxies, virtually all star formation occurs in the disk. In that case, the elongated rings are likewise confined to the disk, and collectively they evolve to appear as (possibly disconnected) segments of spiral arms: See (e.g) NGC 4414, as well as figures in.

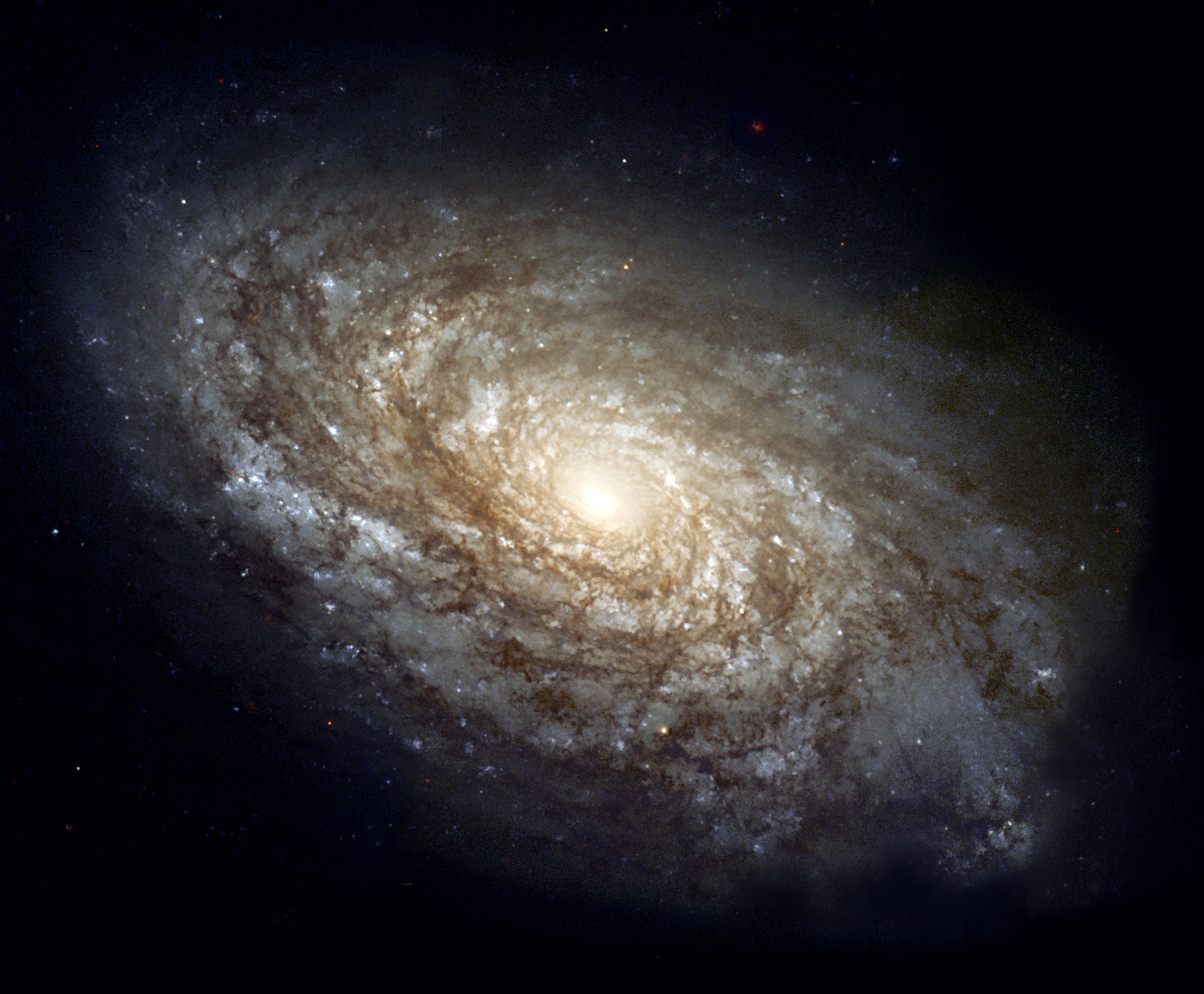
In 1995, the spiral galaxy NGC 4414 was imaged by the Hubble Space Telescope.

In 1999, the prevailing density wave model for the generation of spiral arms in galaxies was combined with SSPSF in a doctoral thesis by Auer (an idea first suggested by Gerola and Seiden in 1980). Auer concluded that density waves are in fact less effective in producing star formation, and more effective in simply organizing ongoing SSPSF into large-scale (spiral) patterns, ultimately into the Grand Design spiral form if conditions allow.

In the figure you can see a simulation of a simple model for SSPSF on a circular grid. It is generated by randomly starting star formation in certain boxes of the grid, which propagates to nearby boxes in the grid while time progresses. Star formation dies out with time and a box has a certain regeneration time which prevents it from starting new star formation just after it was active. Adding (differential) rotation to the disk during propagation creates spiral patterns that are of the same nature of those in actual spiral galaxies. Dark spots are areas of active star formation, lighter spots are areas of recent star formation/areas in regeneration.

SSPSF processes were demonstrated in an early prototype ("Gaslight") of the 2008 video game Spore.

== See also ==
- Flocculent spiral galaxy
- Spiral galaxy
- Galaxy
- Density wave theory – Theory of structure of spiral galaxies
- Conway's Game of Life – Two-dimensional cellular automaton
- Cellular automaton
