= SN 2012fr =

Supernova

- Event type: Supernova
- Ia
- Discovered: October 27, 2012
- Constellation: Fornax
- Declination: -36° 08' 25"
- Epoch: J2000.0
- Distance: 56.2 ± 2.6 Mly
- Host: NGC 1365
- Other designations: SN 2012fr, PSN J03333599-3607377
- Related media on Commons

SN 2012fr was a supernova discovered by Alain Klotz on October 27, 2012, located in the galaxy NGC 1365.

== Discovery ==
When Klotz, an astrophysicist from Institut de Recherche en Astrophysique et Planetologie in France checked the galaxy images from TAROT la Silla observatory, the comparison of the night image of the galaxy with a reference image taken one month before clearly revealed the presence of a new star 3"W and 52"N from the nucleus of the galaxy.

After checking for possible objects like asteroids that might have been in the same location, four individual images that showed the new star were retrieved in the TAROT image archive. Also, the object did not appear in images taken several days before. On October 28 at 6:41 UTC, Emmanuel Conseil sent an email to Alain Klotz indicating he took an image of NGC 1365 using the robotic telescope Slooh robotic telescope. The picture showed the supernova candidate and was seen as the first confirmation.

At 22:00 UTC, Michael Childress from Australian National University took the first spectrum, indicating that it is a Type Ia supernova 11 days before the maximum of light.

On October 31, 2012, the supernova was given the official designation SN 2012fr.

== Observations ==
The TAROT telescope was taking images of the NGC 1365 and NGC 1316 every night from 29 October. The preliminary light curve indicates the supernova becoming bluer before reaching the maximum.

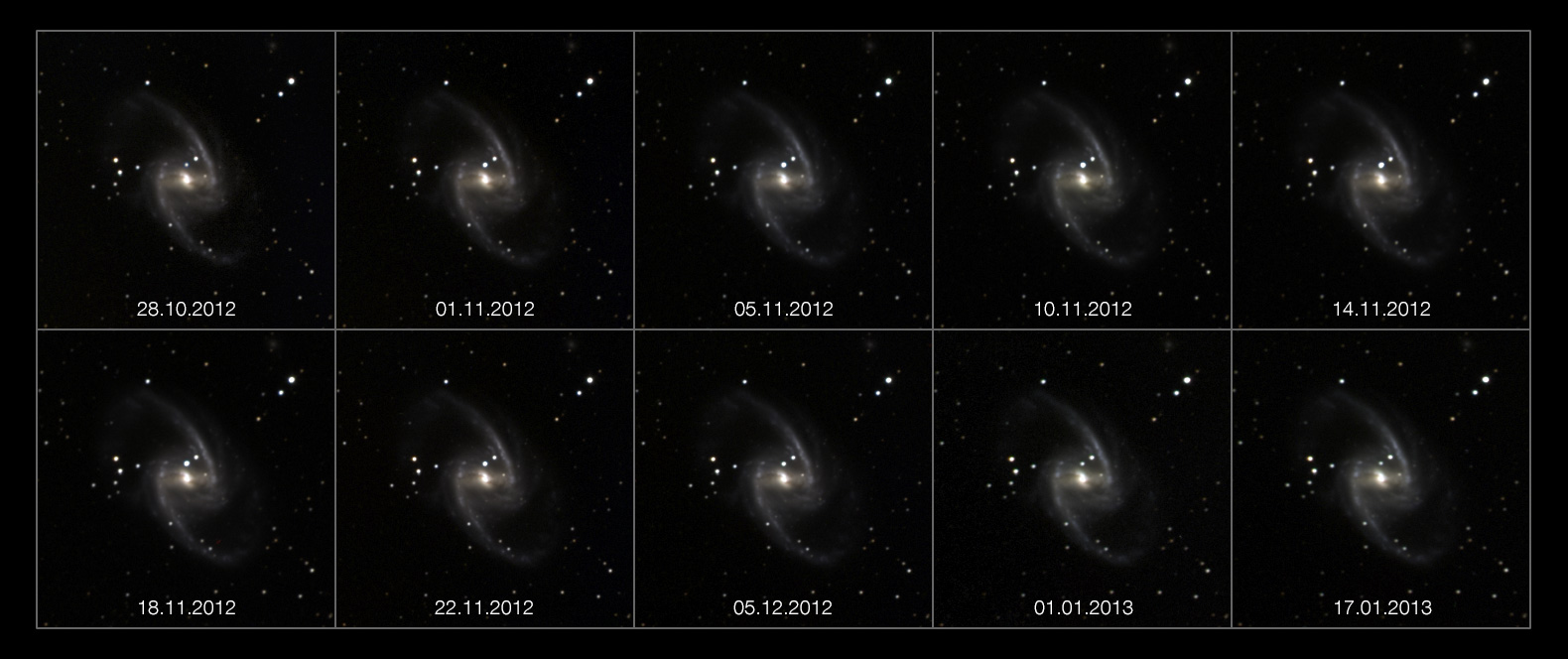
Supernova SN 2012 near nucleus of the galaxy (October 2012 - January 2013)
