= Henize 206 =

Large Magellanic Cloud nebula in the constellation Mensa

Nebula
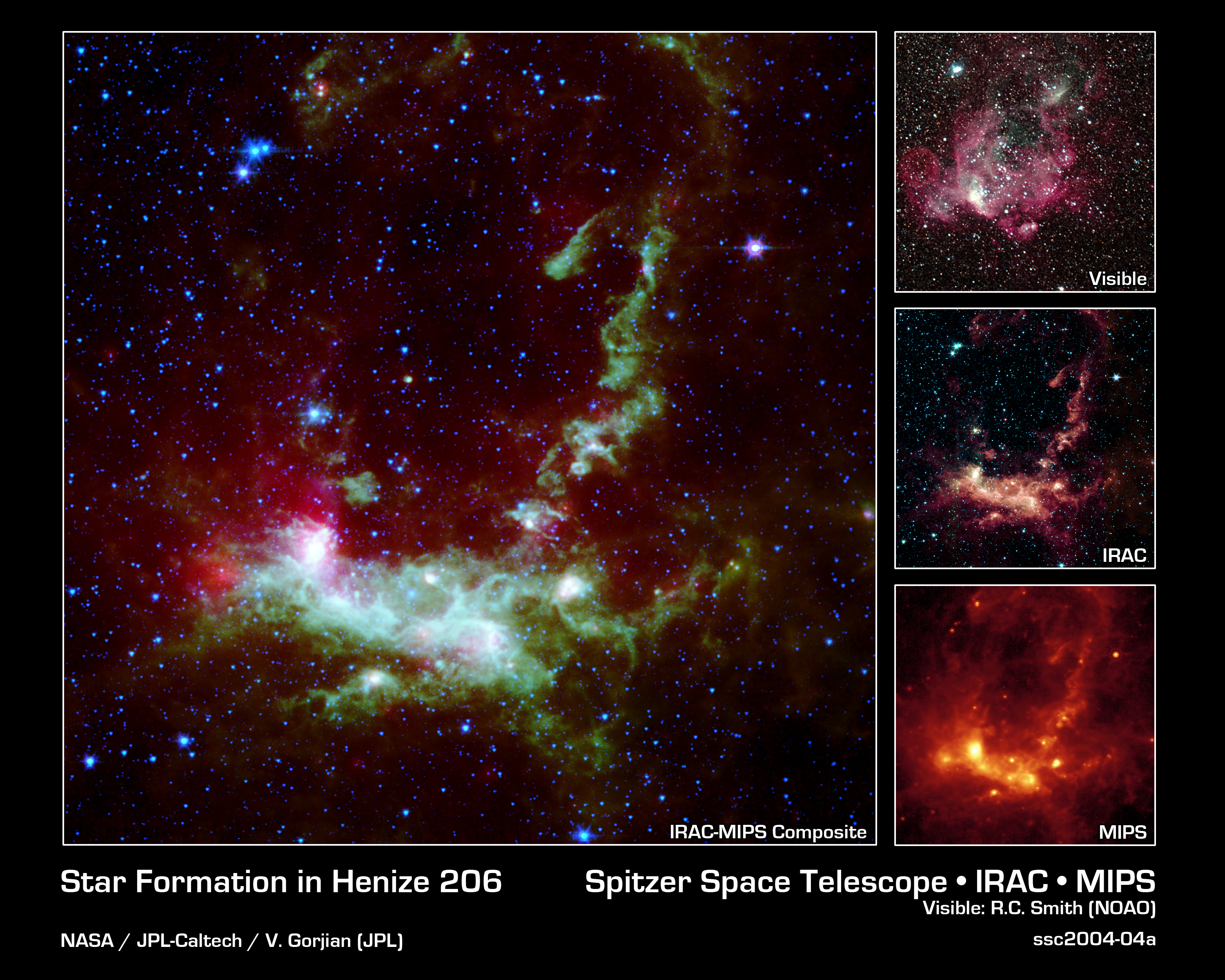
- Henize 206, viewed by different camera devices on the Spitzer Space Telescope. The separate IRAC and MIPS camera images are at right.

Observation data: J2000 epoch
- Right ascension: 05^{h} 31^{m} 15.2^{s}
- Declination: −71° 03′ 58″
- Distance: 160000 ly (50000 pc)
- Constellation: Mensa

Henize 206 (Note: The name "Henize 206" is pronounced as "hen-eyes" after astronomer Karl Henize.) is a nebula in the Large Magellanic Cloud. This luminous cloud of gas and dust houses a cluster of newborn stars. Although Henize 206 was first catalogued in the 1950s, it was reported in NASA press releases in March 2004, for showing several example images generated from the various infrared cameras on the Spitzer Space Telescope launched in August 2003.

== Photos ==
The nebula, Henize 206, and the scattered remnants of the exploding star that created it, are pictured in detail in images from NASA's Spitzer Space Telescope (see image). Henize 206 lies in the Large Magellanic Cloud, a satellite galaxy of the Milky Way galaxy, nearly 163,000 light-years distant. The nebula is home to hundreds and possibly thousands of stars, ranging in age from two to 10 million years old.

The Spitzer images provide a detailed snapshot of a universal phenomenon, self-propagating star formation. By imaging Henize 206 in infrared wavelengths, Spitzer was able to see through blankets of dust that dominate visible light views. The image was converted into a conventional photo by reassigning visible colors to the infrared data. The resulting false-color image shows embedded young stars as bright white spots, with the surrounding gas and dust in blue, green and red. Also shown, especially in the 24-μ (MIPS) image, is a ring of gas, which indicates the wake of the ancient supernova's explosion, with new stars embedded in it.

== Formation and composition ==
According to theories of stellar formation, as in other stellar nurseries, the stars in Henize 206 were created after a dying star, or supernova, exploded, sending intense shockwaves through clouds of cosmic gas and dust. The gas and dust were subsequently compressed into large groups, then gravity further condensed them into massive objects, and stars were born. Eventually, some of the stars are expected to die in a fiery blast, triggering another cycle of stellar birth and death. This recycling of stellar dust and gas appears to occur throughout the Universe. Earth's own Sun is considered to have descended from multiple generations of stars, as evidenced by heavy elements found, in the Solar System, in concentrations too large for a first-time star.

Detailed observations of a star cluster nebula provide astronomers with a laboratory for understanding the early universe, and stellar birth and death cycles.

Henize 206 was first catalogued in the early 1950s by Dr. Karl Henize, an astronomer who became a NASA astronaut. He flew during the Spacelab-2 mission, aboard the Space Shuttle Challenger in July/August 1985. He died in 1993, at age 66, while climbing Mount Everest.
