= Chi2 Fornacis =

Star in the constellation Fornax

χ^{2} Fornacis
- Location of χ^{2} Fornacis (circled)

Observation data Epoch J2000.0 Equinox ICRS
- Constellation: Fornax
- Right ascension: 03^{h} 27^{m} 33.42119^{s}
- Declination: −35° 40′ 52.7728″
- Apparent magnitude (V): 5.70±0.01

Characteristics
- Spectral type: K2 III
- B−V color index: +1.29
- Variable type: suspected

Astrometry
| Radial velocity (R_{v}) | 30.0±4.3 km/s |
| Proper motion (μ) | RA: +77.064 mas/yr Dec.: +5.989 mas/yr |
| Parallax (π) | 6.8558±0.0446 mas |
| Distance | 476 ± 3 ly (145.9 ± 0.9 pc) |
| Absolute magnitude (M_{V}) | 0.00 |

Details
| Mass | 1.18 M_{☉} |
| Radius | 23.58±1.19 R_{☉} |
| Luminosity | 194^{+4}_{−3} L_{☉} |
| Surface gravity (log g) | 1.83 cgs |
| Temperature | 4,477±122 K |
| Metallicity [Fe/H] | +0.02 dex |
| Rotational velocity (v sin i) | <1.0 km/s |

Other designations
- χ^{2} For, 91 G. Fornacis, NSV 15697, CD−36°1306, CPD−36°355, FK5 2244, GC 4129, HD 21574, HIP 16112, HR 1054, SAO 194312, TIC 142889216

Database references
| SIMBAD | data |

Chi^{2} Fornacis, Latinized from χ^{2} Fornacis, is a solitary star located in the southern constellation Fornax, the furnace. It is faintly visible to the naked eye as an orange-hued point of light with an apparent magnitude of 5.70. Gaia DR3 parallax measurements imply a distance of 476 light-years and it is currently receding with a heliocentric radial velocity of approximately 30 km/s. At its current distance, Chi^{2} Fornacis' brightness is diminished by an interstellar extinction of 0.11 magnitudes and it has an absolute magnitude of 0.00.

Chi^{2} Fornacis is an old-disk star and it has a stellar classification of K2 III. The class indicates that it is an evolved K-type giant that has ceased hydrogen fusion at its core and left the main sequence. It has 118% the mass of the Sun but it has expanded to 23.58 times the radius of the Sun. It radiates 194 times the luminosity of the Sun from its photosphere at an effective temperature of 4,477 K. Chi^{2} Fornacis is slightly metal enriched with a near-solar iron abundance of [Fe/H] = +0.02. It spins too slowly for its projected rotational velocity to be measured accurately, having a projected rotational velocity lower than 1.0 km/s.

The star was observed to be variable in infrared light during a 1991 IRAS survey for galaxy clusters. However, its variability in optical light is unknown. In addition, subsequent observations have not confirmed the variability in infrared and optical light. The lenticular galaxy NGC 1380 lies 2 degrees north-northeast of Chi^{2} Fornacis.
