= Corotation circle =

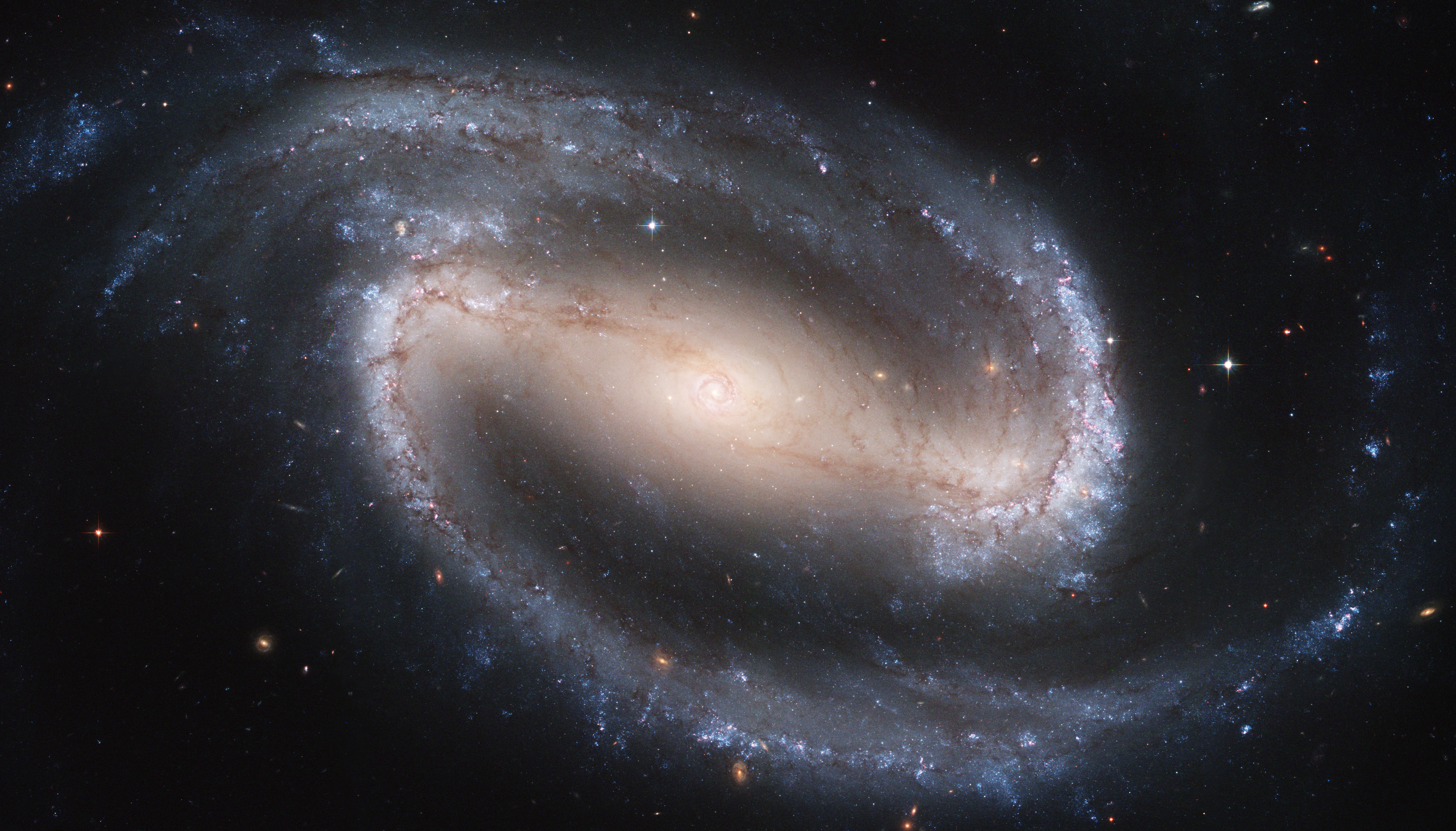
A barred spiral galaxy, NGC 1300.

The corotation circle is the circle around the galactic center of a spiral galaxy, where the stars move at the same speed as the spiral arms. The radius of this circle is called the corotation radius. Inside the circle the stars move faster and outside they move slower than the spiral arms.

The Sun is located near the corotation circle of the Milky Way.

== Influence of dark matter ==
The corotation circle can be used to probe dark matter in a galaxy. In barred spiral galaxies, such as the Milky Way, the stars in the bar rotate faster than the stars in the spiral arms, as they are closer to the centre of the galaxy. Calculations have shown that sufficiently massive dark matter haloes slow the rotation, causing the corotation radius to be greater than 1.4 times the length of the bar.

Most measurements have found that the corotation radius is always less than 1.4 times the bar length, leading to the conclusion that dark matter does not significantly influence galactic rotation.

However, a 2017 study found that the arms of galaxies rotate more slowly than previously thought, implying that dark matter does sometimes influence the rotation of a galaxy even when the corotation radius is less than 1.4 times the bar length.
