= NGC 1380 =

Galaxy in the constellation Fornax

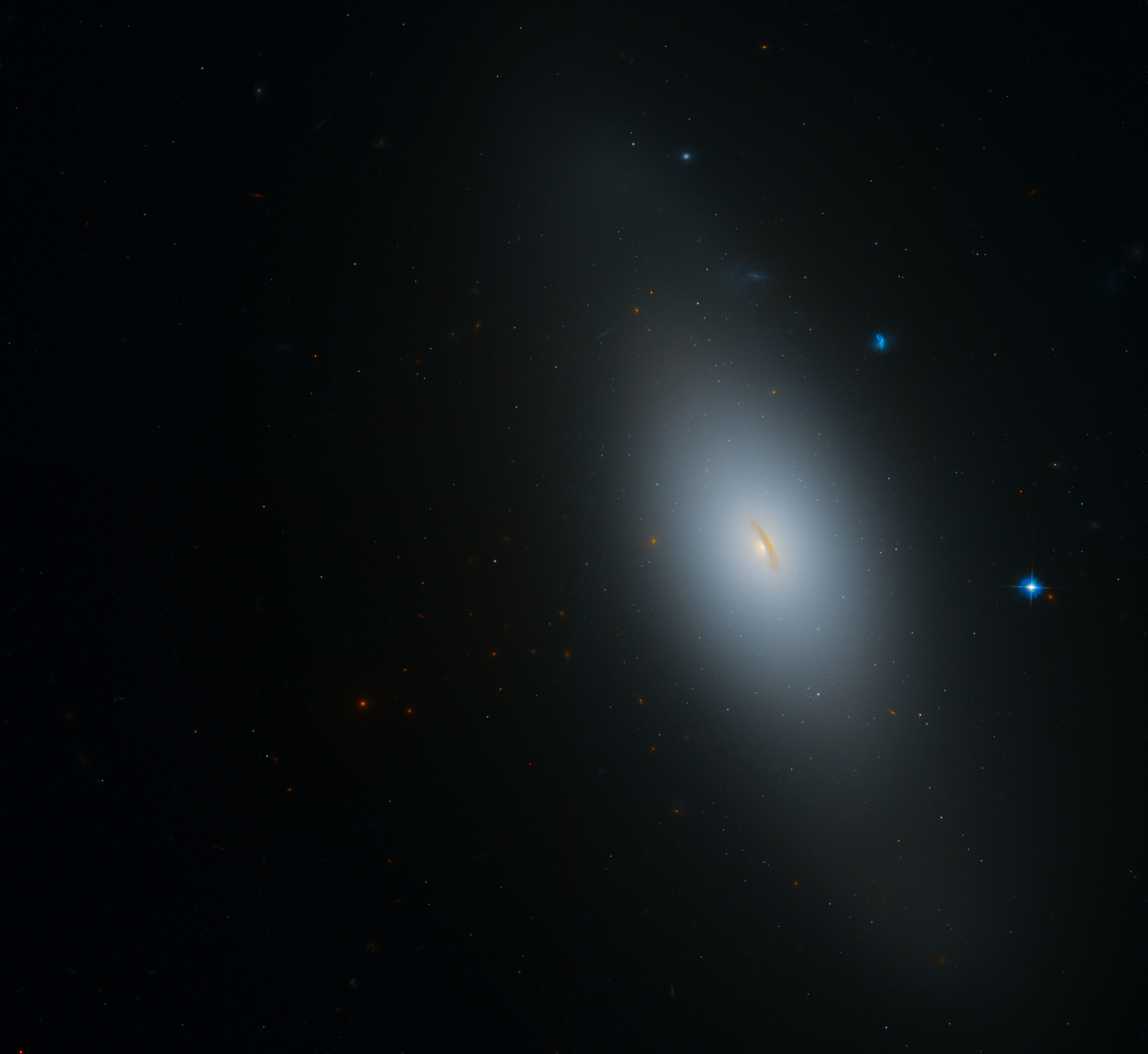
- NGC 1380 imaged by the Hubble Space Telescope

Observation data (J2000 epoch)
- Constellation: Fornax
- Right ascension: 03^{h} 36^{m} 27.5701^{s}
- Declination: −34° 58′ 33.721″
- Redshift: 0.006261 ± 0.000040
- Heliocentric radial velocity: 1,877 ± 12 km/s
- Distance: 60.1 ± 12.1 Mly (18.4 ± 3.7 Mpc)
- Apparent magnitude (V): 9.9

Characteristics
- Type: SA0
- Size: ~139,000 ly (42.63 kpc) (estimated)
- Apparent size (V): 4.8′ × 2.3′

Other designations
- ESO 358- G028, AM 0334-350, IRAS 03345-3508, MCG -06-09-002, PGC 13318

NGC 1380 is a lenticular galaxy located in the constellation Fornax. It is located at a distance of about 60 million light years from Earth, which, given its apparent dimensions, means that NGC 1380 is about 85,000 light years across. It was discovered by James Dunlop on September 2, 1826. It is a member of the Fornax Cluster.

== Supermassive black hole and nucleus ==
In the centre of NGC 1380 lies a supermassive black hole whose mass is estimated to be 2.2+1.8
−0.9×10^{8} M_{☉} based on the velocity dispersion of the globular clusters of the galaxy. The nucleus of NGC 1380 is a probable LINER, based on its narrow emission lines. No broad line region has been detected in NGC 1380. The nuclear spectrum appears reddened, maybe due to the presence of gas and dust around the nucleus, maybe a result of mergers. There appears to be a second element in the nucleus of the galaxy, maybe an HII region. NGC 1380 features a gas disk which co-rotates with the stellar disk, suggesting an internal origin. There is an HII region 1.8 arcseconds south of the nucleus and a diffuse H-alpha region, another HII region, observed 1.8 arcseconds north of the nucleus. The X-ray emission from the galaxy as observed by ROSAT can be explained as thermal emission from a hot interstellar medium and no hard component was detected.

== Globular clusters ==
It is estimated that there are 555±33 globular clusters in NGC 1380. There are two district populations of globular clusters, one red and one blue. The blue globular clusters have similar color and magnitude as the globular clusters in the halo of the Milky Way, but have a flatter surface density profile. The red globular clusters form the majority of the globular clusters of the galaxy. They have similar distribution to the stellar disk of NGC 1380 and have slightly higher metallicity than the globular clusters in the Milky Way, and are associated with the bulge of the galaxy. Based on their size, there are three star cluster populations, the typical globular clusters, with effective radius under 3 pc, the diffuse star clusters, with effective radius circa 5 pc, and the faint fuzzy clusters, with effective radius over 8 pc. The typical globular clusters are closer to the nucleus than the diffuse star clusters.

== Environment ==
NGC 1380 lies in the central part of the Fornax Cluster, 35 arcminutes northwest of the large elliptical galaxy NGC 1399. In the same field of view lie the galaxies NGC 1380A, NGC 1379, NGC 1381, NGC 1382, and NGC 1387. NGC 1380 lies 2 degrees north-northeast of χ^{2} Fornacis and because of its high surface brightness can be spotted with a five inch telescope even from bright suburban skies.

Based on the properties of its inner stellar halo, it appears that NGC 1380 went through a massive galaxy merger event about 10 billion years ago. The now-consumed satellite galaxy contributed 3.7+2.7
−1.5×10^{10} M_{☉} to the mass of NGC 1380, which is about one-fifth of its current mass.

== Supernova ==
One supernova has been detected in NGC 1380: SN 1992A (Type Ia, mag. 12.8) was discovered by W. Liller on 11 January 1992 and independently by N. Brown on 12 January 1992.

== Gallery ==
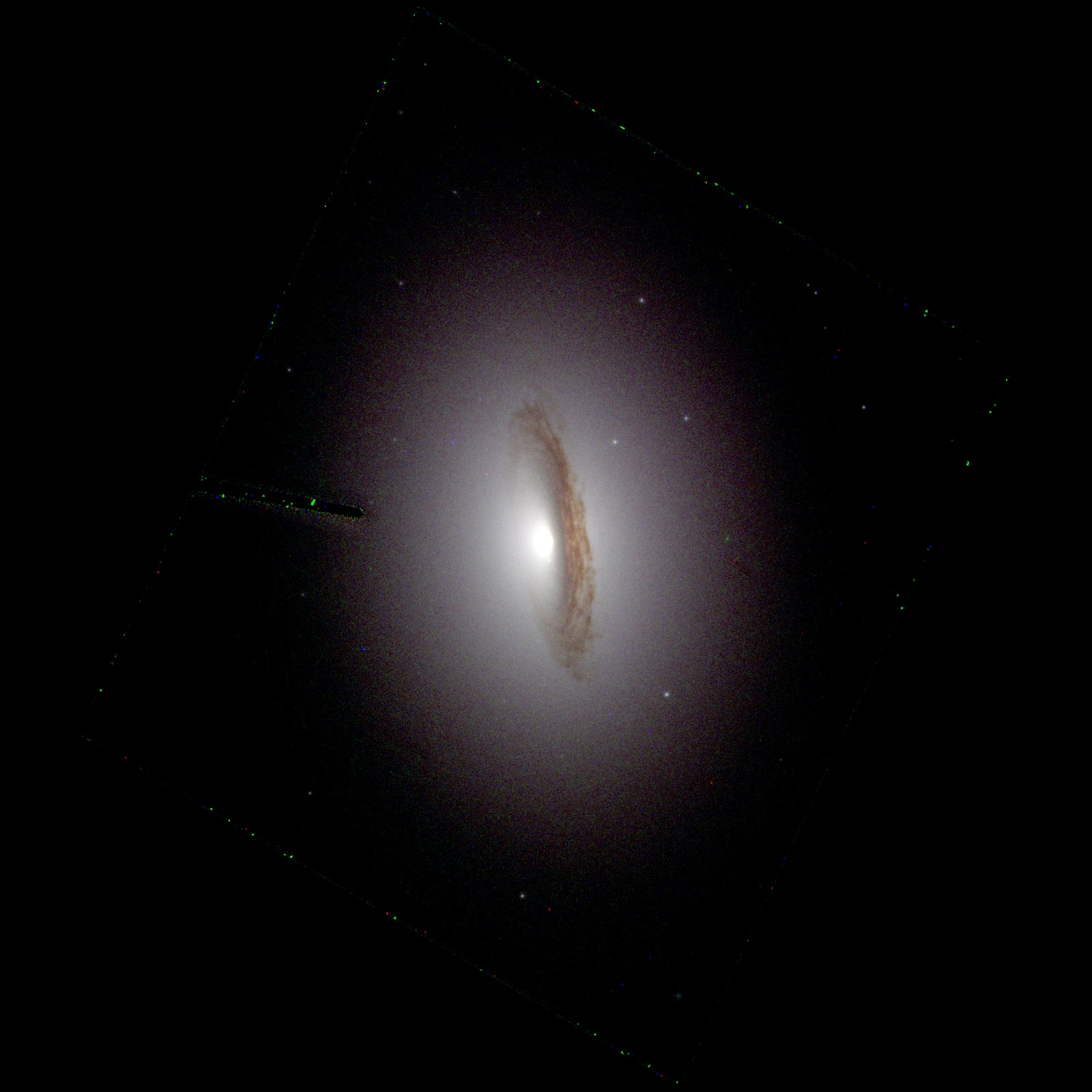
The central region of NGC 1380, by HST showing a dust disk

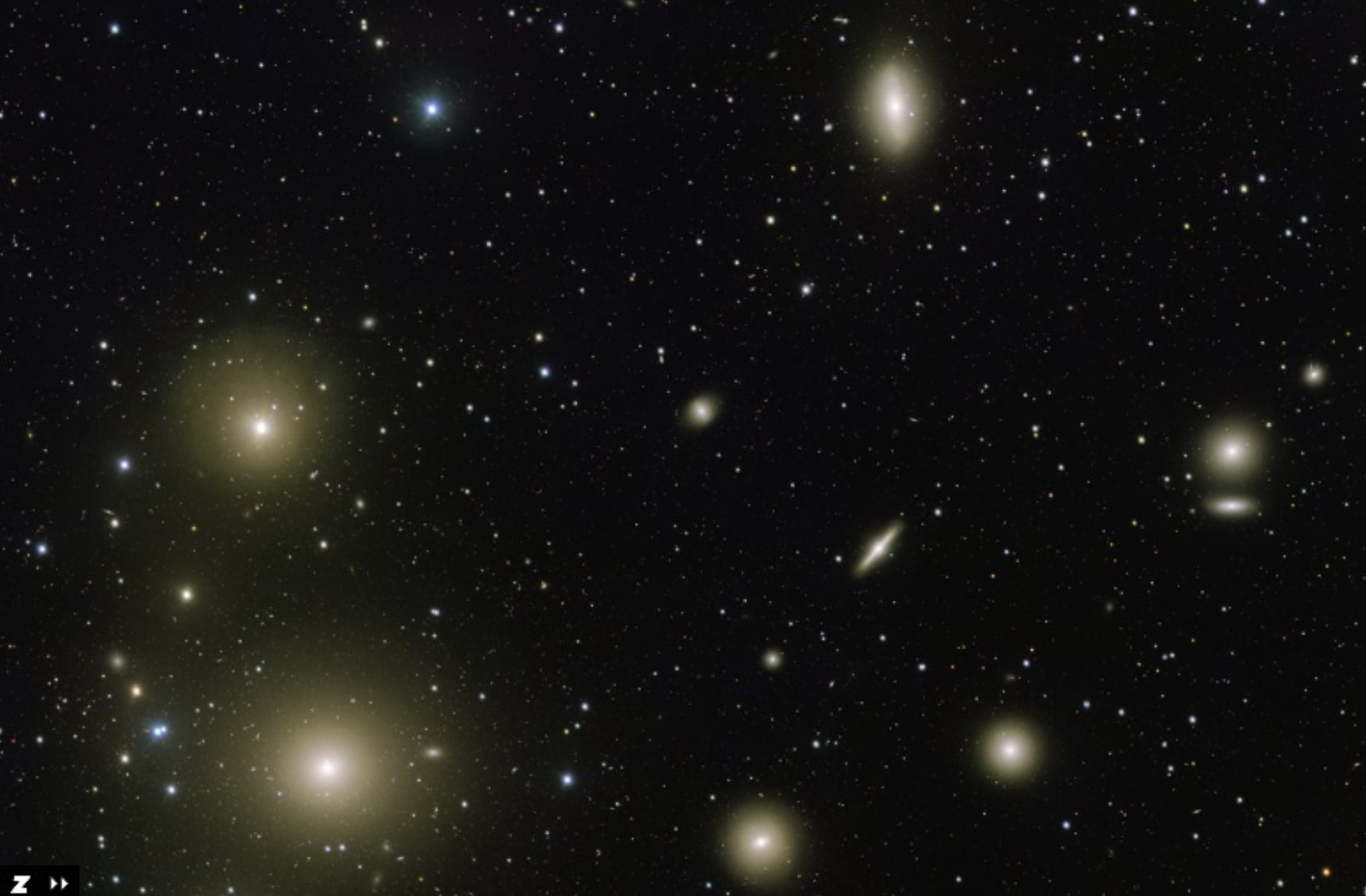
The central part of Fornax Cluster by ESO. NGC 1380 can be seen at the top right of the image.

== See also ==
- List of NGC objects (1001–2000)
