= NGC 2532 =

Galaxy in the constellation Lynx

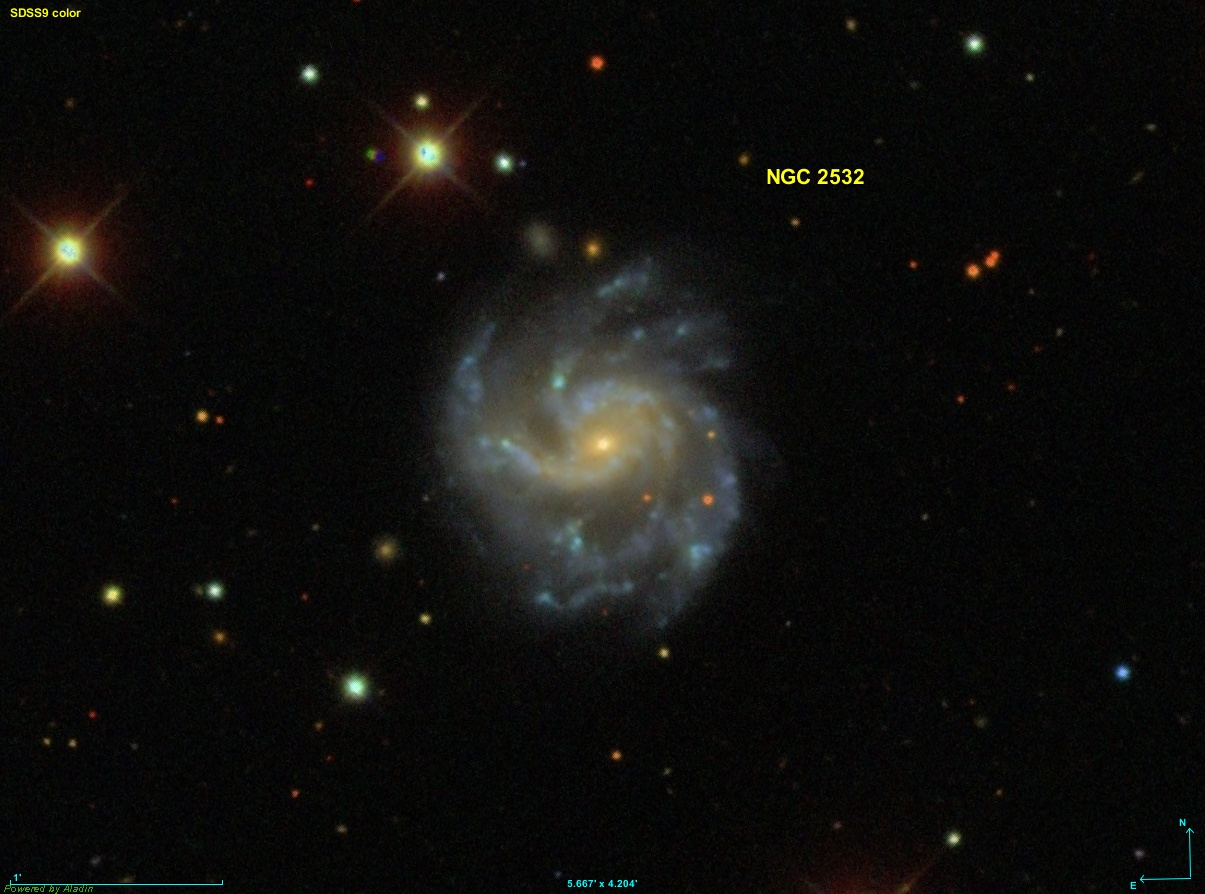
- NGC 2532 imaged by SDSS

Observation data (J2000 epoch)
- Constellation: Lynx
- Right ascension: 08^{h} 10^{m} 15.1840^{s}
- Declination: +33° 57′ 23.757″
- Redshift: 0.017506±0.000002
- Heliocentric radial velocity: 5,248±1 km/s
- Distance: 128.97 ± 6.85 Mly (39.543 ± 2.099 Mpc)
- Apparent magnitude (V): 13.5g

Characteristics
- Type: SAB(rs)c
- Size: ~84,000 ly (25.75 kpc) (estimated)
- Apparent size (V): 1.74′ × 1.47′

Other designations
- IRAS 08070+3406, UGC 4256, MCG +06-18-013, PGC 22922, CGCG 178-032

NGC 2532 is a barred spiral galaxy in the constellation of Lynx. Its velocity with respect to the cosmic microwave background is 5,437±13 km/s, which corresponds to a Hubble distance of 261.6 ± 18.3 Mly (80.20 ± 5.62 Mpc). However, seven non-redshift measurements give a much closer mean distance of 128.97 ± 6.85 Mly (39.543 ± 2.099 Mpc). It was discovered by German-British astronomer William Herschel on 5 February 1788.

NGC 2532 has an active galactic nucleus, i.e. it has a compact region at the center of a galaxy that emits a significant amount of energy across the electromagnetic spectrum, with characteristics indicating that this luminosity is not produced by the stars.

== Supernovae ==
Three supernovae have been observed in NGC 2532:

- SN 1999gb (Type IIn, mag. 16.1) was discovered by the Lick Observatory Supernova Search (LOSS) on 22 November 1999.
- SN 2002hn (Type Ic, mag. 16.8) was discovered by LOTOSS (Lick Observatory and Tenagra Observatory Supernova Searches) on 5 November 2002.
- SN 2016gil (Type II, mag. 18) was discovered by the Gaia Photometric Science Alerts programme on 17 September 2016.

== See also ==
- List of NGC objects (2001–3000)
