= Frank Shu =

American astrophysicist, astronomer and author (1943–2023)

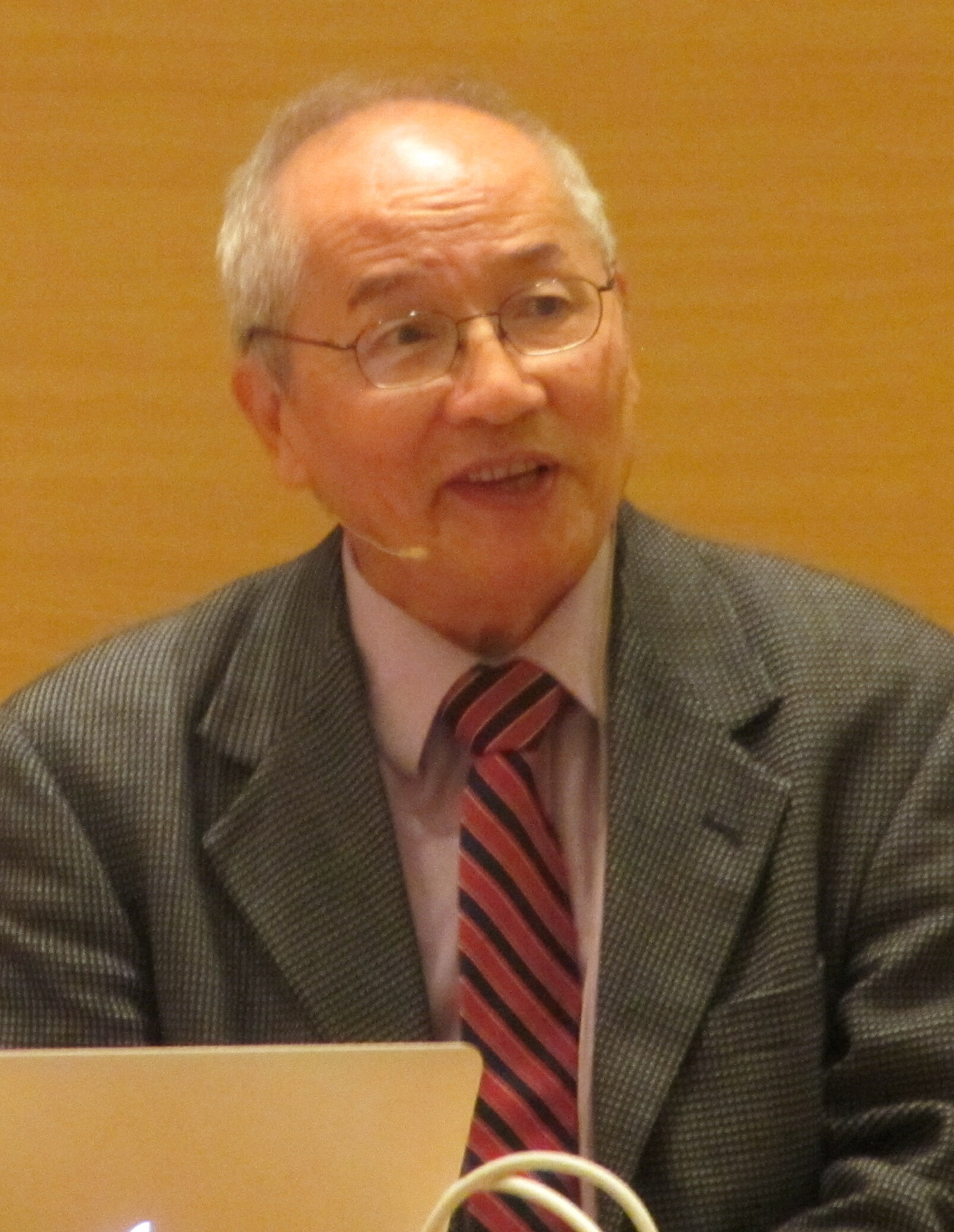
- Born: Frank Hsia-San Shu; June 2, 1943; Kunming, China
- Died: April 22, 2023 (aged 79); Atherton, California, U.S.
- Education: Massachusetts Institute of Technology (BS); Harvard University (PhD)
- Known for: Density wave theory Star formation
- Awards: Helen B. Warner Prize for Astronomy; Brouwer Award; Dannie Heineman Prize for Astrophysics; Shaw Prize in Astronomy; Bruce Medal
- Scientific career
- Fields: Astronomy
- Institutions: Stony Brook University; University of California, Berkeley; National Tsing Hua University; University of California, San Diego; City University of Hong Kong
- Thesis: The Dynamics and Large-Scale Structure of Spiral Galaxies (1968)
- Doctoral advisor: Chia-Chiao Lin
- Other academic advisors: Max Krook
- Doctoral students: Fred Adams; Susana Lizano; Eve Ostriker
Frank Shu
- Traditional Chinese: 徐遐生
- Simplified Chinese: 徐遐生
Transcriptions
Yue: Cantonese
- Yale Romanization: Chèuih Hàh Sāng
- Jyutping: Ceoi^{4} Haa^{4} Sang^{1}

Frank Hsia-San Shu (Chinese: 徐遐生; Jyutping: Ceoi4 Haa4 Sang1; June 2, 1943 – April 22, 2023) was a Chinese-American astrophysicist, astronomer, and author. He served as a Professor Emeritus at the University of California, Berkeley and University of California, San Diego. He is best known for proposing the density wave theory to explain the structure of spiral galaxies, and for describing a model of star formation, where a giant dense molecular cloud collapses to form a star.

== Early life and education ==
Shu's hometown is Wenzhou, Zhejiang, but he was born in Kunming, Yunnan, in 1943. His father, Shu Shien-Siu, was a mathematician and an instructor at the National Tsing Hua University, which, at that time due to World War II, was temporarily relocated to Kunming from Beijing. The senior Shu would serve as the President of the National Tsing Hua University from 1970 to 1975. When Shu was two months old, his father went to the United States for study and, later, work. Shu and his family went to Taiwan through Hong Kong when he was five years old, stayed there for a year, and then traveled by steamship to the United States to re-unite with the senior Shu, who was working at the Illinois Institute of Technology, Chicago.

Shu completed his B.S. in physics in 1963 at the Massachusetts Institute of Technology (MIT). While at MIT, he worked one summer for Chia-Chiao Lin on the structure of spiral galaxies, and the experience made him interested in astrophysics. He later continued working with Lin for his PhD project, as Max Krook, his formal doctoral supervisor at Harvard University, gave him freedom in his PhD research. He obtained his PhD from Harvard in 1968.

Over his PhD study, he built on his undergraduate work and, together with Lin, proposed the density wave theory and published several articles explaining the structure of spiral galaxies.

== Career ==
After his PhD, Shu joined the Stony Brook University as an assistant professor, and was promoted to associate professor in 1971. He moved to the University of California, Berkeley in 1973, and became a full professor in 1976. He had a brief visit at the Institute for Advanced Study in 1982. Between 1984 and 1988, he was the chair, or Head, of the Department of Astronomy.

From 1994 to 1996, Shu was also the President of the American Astronomical Society (AAS).

Shu was named a University Professor of the University of California (UC) system in 1998, an honour that at the time was only endowed to 19 faculty members across the UC system.

In 2002, Shu followed in his father's footsteps and went to Taiwan to take up the position of the President of the National Tsing Hua University, returning to the United States and joining the University of California, San Diego as a distinguished professor in 2006.

Shu officially retired in 2009, becoming a University Professor Emeritus of the UC system, and a Distinguished Research Fellow at the Academia Sinica Institute of Astronomy and Astrophysics (until 2015).

Latterly, Shu was an Emeritus Senior Fellow at the Hong Kong Institute for Advanced Study of the City University of Hong Kong.

Shu wrote three textbooks: Physical Universe: An Introduction to Astronomy, The Physics of Astrophysics Vol. I: Radiation and The Physics of Astrophysics Vol. II: Gas Dynamics.

Shu died on April 22, 2023, at the age of 79.

== Research ==
Shu is best known for his work in spiral galaxies and star formation. He, together with his PhD supervisor Chia-Chiao Lin, proposed the density wave theory to explain the structure of spiral galaxies. In 1977, he published a model, known as the "inside-out" collapse model or the "singular isothermal sphere" model, of star formation, whereby a star forms when a giant dense molecular cloud collapses.

== Honors and awards ==
- Helen B. Warner Prize for Astronomy (1977)
- Member of the National Academy of Sciences (1987)
- Academician of the Academia Sinica, Taiwan (1990)
- Fellow of the American Academy of Arts and Sciences (1992)
- Brouwer Award (1996)
- Dannie Heineman Prize for Astrophysics (2000)
- Member of the American Philosophical Society (2003)
- Foreign Associate of the Royal Astronomical Society (2006)
- Member of The World Academy of Sciences (2006)
- Centennial Medal, Graduate School of Arts and Sciences, Harvard University (2008)
- Shaw Prize in Astronomy (2009)
- Bruce Medal (2009)

The main-belt asteroid 18238 Frankshu is named after Shu.

Academic offices
| Preceded by Chung Laung Liu | President of the National Tsing Hua University; 2002–2006 | Succeeded by Wen-Tsuen Chen |
