= Density wave theory =

Theory of structure of spiral galaxies

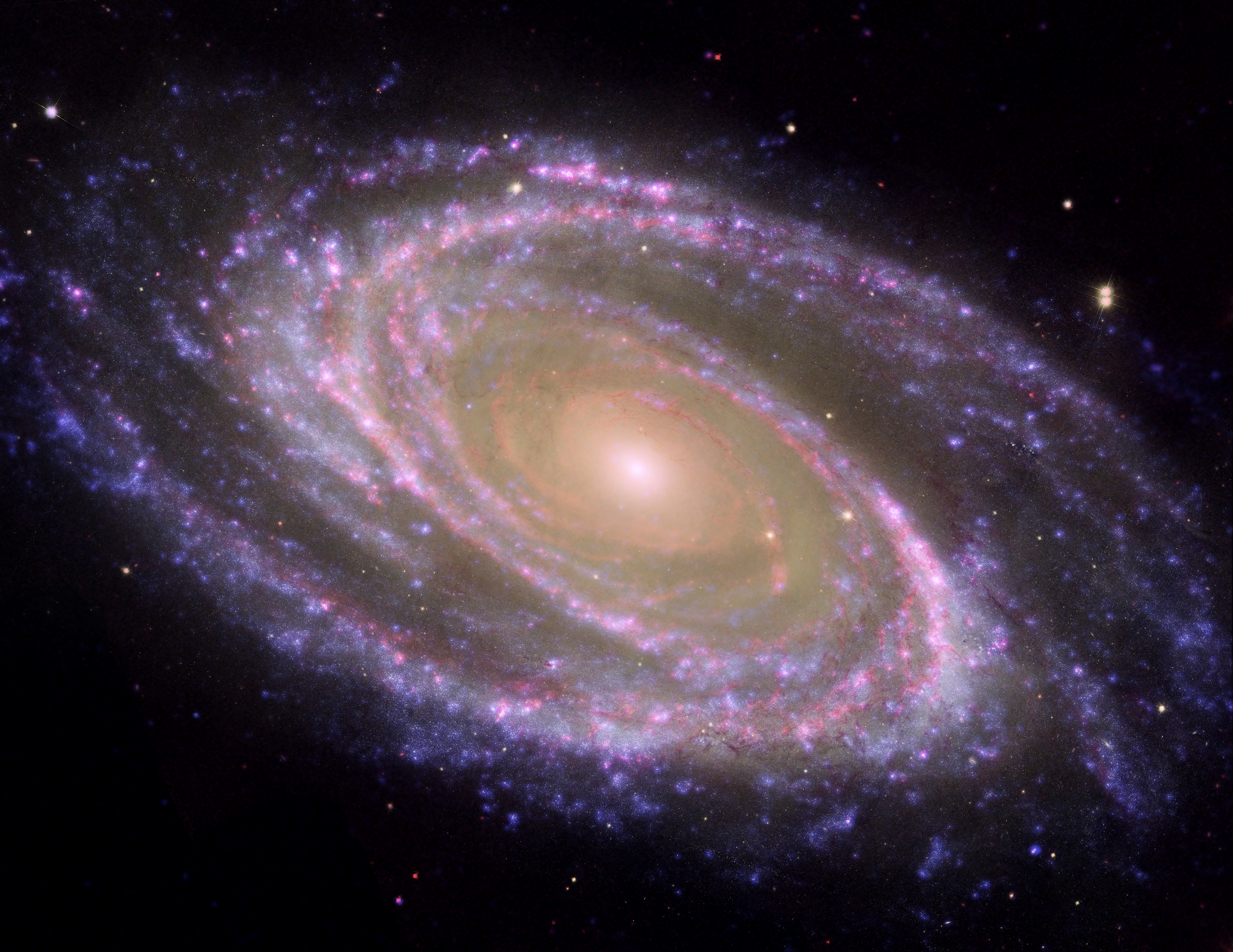
Image of spiral galaxy M81 combining data from the Hubble, Spitzer, and GALEX space telescopes.

Density wave theory or the Lin–Shu density wave theory is a theory proposed by C.C. Lin and Frank Shu in the mid-1960s to explain the spiral arm structure of spiral galaxies. The Lin–Shu theory introduces the idea of long-lived quasi-stationary spiral structure (QSSS hypothesis). In this hypothesis, the spiral pattern rotates with a particular angular frequency (pattern speed), whereas the stars in the galactic disk orbit at varying speeds, which depend on their distance to the galaxy center. The presence of spiral density waves in galaxies has implications on star formation, since the gas orbiting around the galaxy may be compressed and cause shock waves periodically. Theoretically, the formation of a global spiral pattern is treated as an instability of the stellar disk caused by the self-gravity, as opposed to tidal interactions. The mathematical formulation of the theory has also been extended to other astrophysical disk systems, such as Saturn's rings.

== Galactic spiral arms ==
Explanation of spiral galaxy arms.

Simulation of a Galaxy with a simple spiral arm pattern. Although the spiral arms do not rotate, the galaxy does. If you watch closely you will see stars moving in and out of the spiral arms as time progresses.

Originally, astronomers had the idea that the arms of a spiral galaxy were material. However, if this were the case, then the arms would become more and more tightly wound, since the matter nearer to the center of the galaxy rotates faster than the matter at the edge of the galaxy. The arms would become indistinguishable from the rest of the galaxy after only a few orbits. This is called the winding problem.

Lin & Shu proposed in 1964 that the arms were not material in nature, but instead made up of areas of greater density, similar to a traffic jam on a highway. The cars move through the traffic jam: the density of cars increases in the middle of it. The traffic jam itself, however, moves more slowly. In the galaxy, stars, gas, dust, and other components move through the density waves, are compressed, and then move out of them.

More specifically, the density wave theory argues that the "gravitational attraction between stars at different radii" prevents the so-called winding problem, and actually maintains the spiral pattern.

The rotation speed of the arms is defined to be $\Omega_{gp}$, the global pattern speed. (Thus, within a certain non-inertial reference frame, which is rotating at $\Omega_{gp}$, the spiral arms appear to be at rest). The stars within the arms are not necessarily stationary, though at a certain distance from the center, $R_{c}$, the corotation radius, the stars and the density waves move together. Inside that radius, stars move more quickly ($\Omega > \Omega_{gp}$) than the spiral arms, and outside, stars move more slowly ($\Omega < \Omega_{gp}$). For an m-armed spiral, a star at radius R from the center will move through the structure with a frequency $m(\Omega_{gp} - \Omega (R))$. So, the gravitational attraction between stars can only maintain the spiral structure if the frequency at which a star passes through the arms is less than the epicyclic frequency, $\kappa (R)$, of the star. This means that a long-lived spiral structure will only exist between the inner and outer Lindblad resonance (ILR, OLR, respectively), which are defined as the radii such that: $\Omega (R)=\Omega_{gp} + \kappa /m$ and $\Omega (R)=\Omega_{gp} - \kappa /m$, respectively. Past the OLR and within the ILR, the extra density in the spiral arms pulls more often than the epicyclic rate of the stars, and the stars are thus unable to react and move in such a way as to "reinforce the spiral density enhancement".

Animation 1: If the spiral arms were rigid mass concentrations, the galaxy must rotate as a whole around its center in order to maintain its spiral structure. According to Lindblad's observation and the laws of physics this is not the case.

Animation 2: Differential rotation as observed by Lindblad would dissolve spiral arms in a short period of time were they composed of fixed mass concentrations.

Animation 3: Orbits predicted by the density wave theory allow the existence of stable spiral arms. Stars move in and out of the spiral arms as they orbit the galaxy.

== Further implications ==
The density wave theory also explains a number of other observations that have been made about spiral galaxies. For example, "the ordering of H I clouds and dust bands on the inner edges of spiral arms, the existence of young, massive stars and H II regions throughout the arms, and an abundance of old, red stars in the remainder of the disk".

When clouds of gas and dust enter into a density wave and are compressed, the rate of star formation increases as some clouds meet the Jeans criterion, and collapse to form new stars. Since star formation does not happen immediately, the stars are slightly behind the density waves. The hot OB stars that are created ionize the gas of the interstellar medium, and form H II regions. These stars have relatively short lifetimes, however, and expire before fully leaving the density wave. The smaller, redder stars do leave the wave, and become distributed throughout the galactic disk.

Density waves have also been described as pressurizing gas clouds and thereby catalyzing star formation.

== Application to Saturn's rings ==
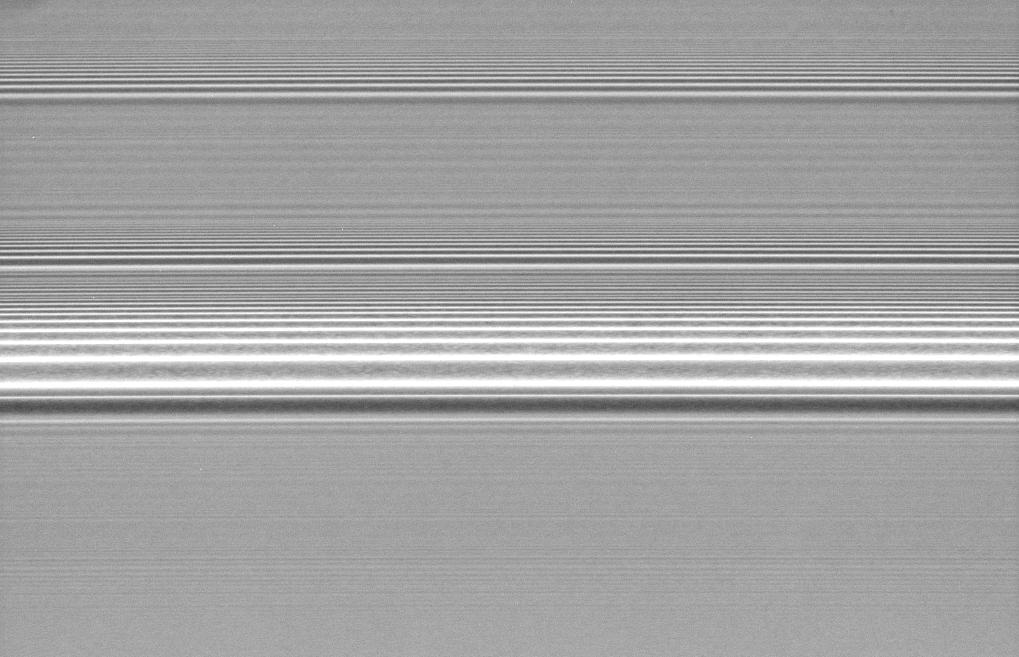
Spiral density waves in Saturn's A Ring induced by resonances with nearby moons.

Beginning in the late 1970s, Peter Goldreich, Frank Shu, and others applied density wave theory to the rings of Saturn. Saturn's rings (particularly the A Ring) contain a great many spiral density waves and spiral bending waves excited by Lindblad resonances and vertical resonances (respectively) with Saturn's moons. The physics are largely the same as with galaxies, though spiral waves in Saturn's rings are much more tightly wound (extending a few hundred kilometers at most) due to the very large central mass (Saturn itself) compared to the mass of the disk. The Cassini mission revealed very small density waves excited by the ring-moons Pan and Atlas and by high-order resonances with the larger moons, as well as waves whose form changes with time due to the varying orbits of Janus and Epimetheus.

== See also ==
- Barred spiral galaxy
- Dark matter
- Galaxy
- Magellanic spiral
- Spiral galaxy
- Self-propagating star formation

== External sources ==
- Bertin, Giuseppe. 2000. Dynamics of Galaxies. Cambridge: Cambridge University Press.
- Bertin, G. and C.C. Lin. 1996. Spiral Structure in Galaxies: A Density Wave Theory. Cambridge: MIT Press.
- C.C. Lin, Yuan, C., and F.H. Shu, "On the Spiral Structure of Disk i Galaxies III. Comparison with Observations", Ap.J. 155, 721 (1969). (SCI)
- Yuan, C.,"Application of Density-Wave Theory to the Spiral Structure of the Milky Way System I. Systematic Motion of Neutral Hydrogen", Ap.J., 158, 871 (1969). (SCI)
