= NGC 1385 =

Galaxy in the constellation Fornax

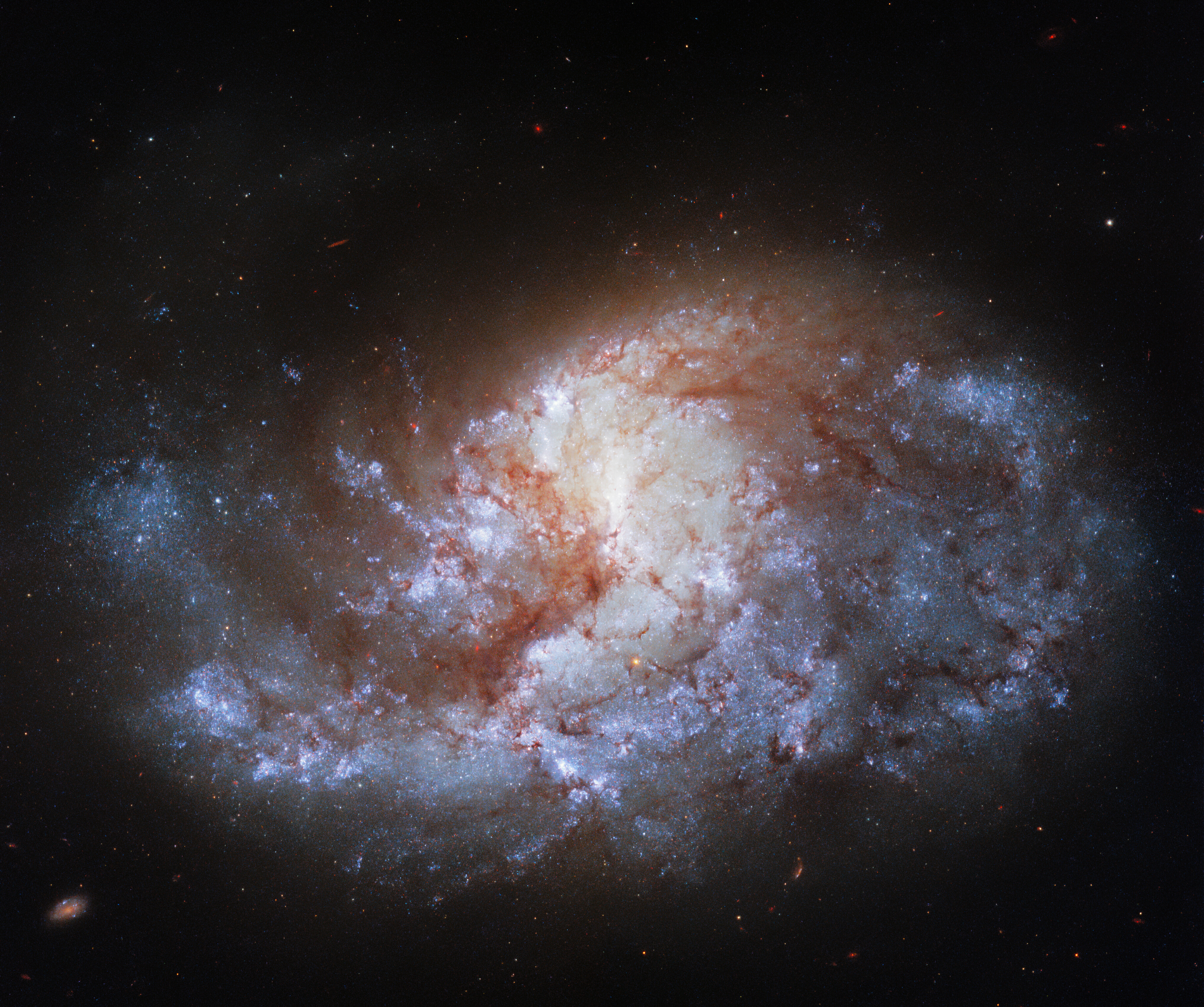
- NGC 1385 imaged by the Hubble Space Telescope

Observation data (J2000 epoch)
- Constellation: Fornax
- Right ascension: 03^{h} 37^{m} 28.9794^{s}
- Declination: −24° 29′ 59.976″
- Redshift: 0.004993
- Heliocentric radial velocity: 1497 ± 4 km/s
- Distance: 52.18 ± 7.22 Mly (15.999 ± 2.215 Mpc)
- Group or cluster: NGC 1395 Group (LGG 97)
- Apparent magnitude (V): 11.76

Characteristics
- Type: SB(s)cd
- Size: ~94,000 ly (28.82 kpc) (estimated)
- Apparent size (V): 3.4′ × 2.0′

Other designations
- IRAS 03353-2439, 2MASX J10214758+5655494, MCG -04-09-036, PGC 13368, ESO 482-016

NGC 1385 is a barred spiral galaxy in the constellation of Fornax. Its velocity with respect to the cosmic microwave background is 1381 ± 9 km/s, which corresponds to a Hubble distance of 66.4 ± 4.7 Mly (20.37 ± 1.43 Mpc). However, 30 non redshift measurements give a closer distance of 52.18 ± 7.22 Mly (15.999 ± 2.215 Mpc). The galaxy was discovered by German-British astronomer William Herschel on 17 November 1784.

In 2024, NGC 1385 was imaged by James Webb Space Telescope as part of Physics at High Angular Project resolution in Nearby GalaxieS (PHANGS) project, studying phases of star formations.

== Morphology ==
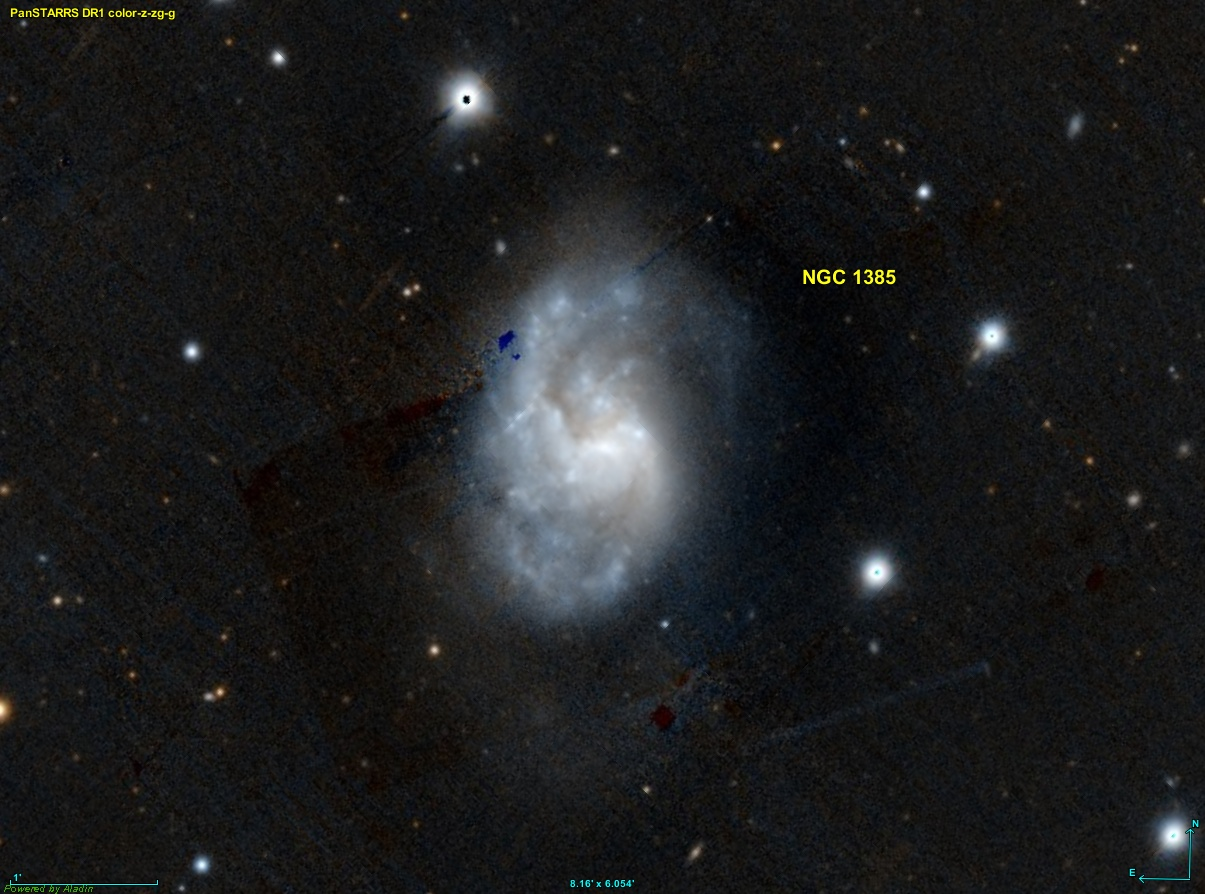
NGC 1385 imaged by Pan-STARRS

NGC 1385 is classified as a type SBd galaxy when observed in B-bands but also classified as type SBdm in H-bands. The bulge of the galaxy is small with a stubby bar running through it. The galaxy's inner disk has scattered cottony spiral arms emerging from several locations. Star-forming knots are present in the galaxy, with its inner arms composed of two straight segments that extend north from the bar region. NGC 1385 has an asymmetric outer disk with little emission on its northwest side.

== NGC 1395 Group ==
NGC 1385 is part of the NGC 1395 group (also known as LGG 97), which includes at least 31 members, including: NGC 1315, NGC 1325, NGC 1331, NGC 1332, NGC 1347, NGC 1353, NGC 1371, NGC 1377, NGC 1395, NGC 1401, NGC 1414, NGC 1415, NGC 1422, NGC 1426, NGC 1438, NGC 1439, IC 1952, IC 1953, and IC 1962. This group is also part of the Eridanus Cluster.

== Luminous blue variable ==
Although no supernovae have yet been observed in NGC 1385, the astronomical transient AT 2020pju was discovered by the Gaia Photometric Science Alerts on 18 June 2020. Spectral analysis revealed the star to be a luminous blue variable.

== Gallery ==
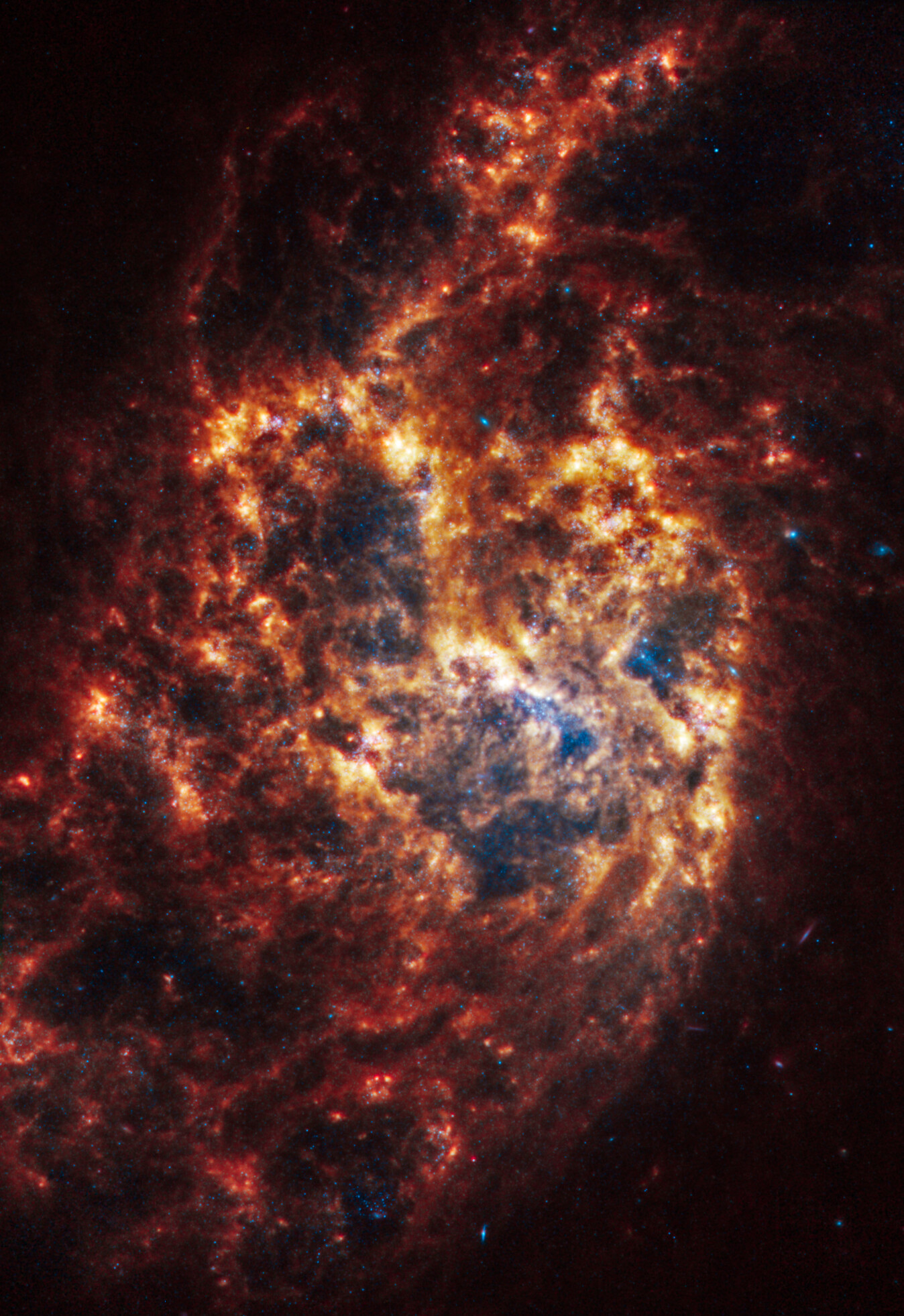
Captured by James Webb Space Telescope. The image shows NGC 1385 as a face-on spiral with filamentary structures and central blue regions.

== See also ==
- List of NGC objects (1001–2000)
