= NGC 1377 =

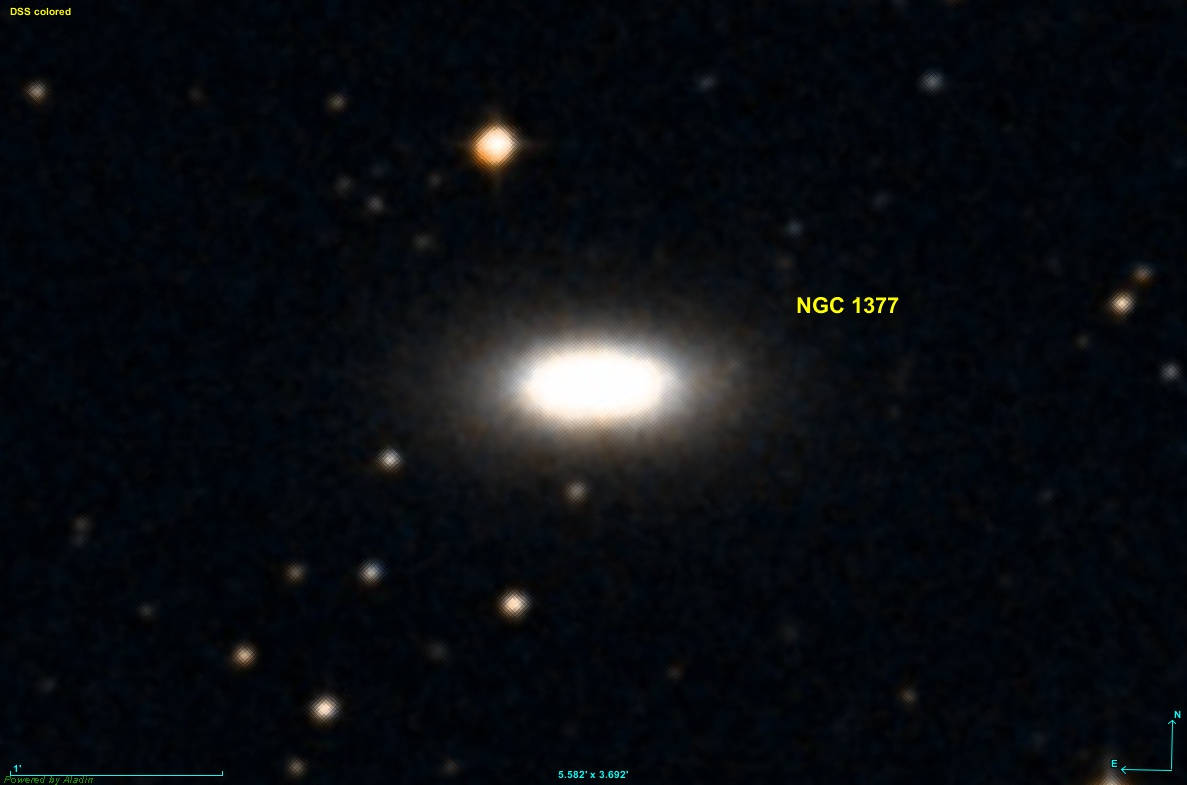
- Image of NGC 1377

Observation data (J2000 epoch)
- Constellation: Eridanus
- Right ascension: 3^{h} 36^{m} 39.0730^{s}
- Declination: −20° 54′ 57.050″
- Redshift: 0.005977 ± 0.00004
- Heliocentric radial velocity: 1792 ± 30 km/s
- Apparent magnitude (V): 13.38

Characteristics
- Type: S0^0
- Size: ~600,500 ly (184.10 kpc) (estimated)

Other designations
- WISEA J033639.06-205406.9, PGC 13324

NGC 1377 (also known as PGC 13324) is a lenticular galaxy in the constellation Eridanus. It was discovered on Dec 19, 1799 by William Herschel.

== NGC 1395 group ==
NGC 1377 is part of the NGC 1395 Group, which is included in the larger Eridanus Cluster, and which includes at least 31 galaxies, including NGC 1315, NGC 1325, NGC 1331, NGC 1332, NGC 1347, NGC 1353, NGC 1371, NGC 1377, NGC 1385, NGC 1395, NGC 1401, NGC 1414, NGC 1415, NGC 1422, NGC 1426, NGC 1438, NGC 1439, IC 1952, IC 1953 and IC 1962.

== See also ==
- List of NGC objects (1001-2000)
- List of NGC objects
