= IC 1953 =

Barred spiral Galaxy in the constellation Eridanus

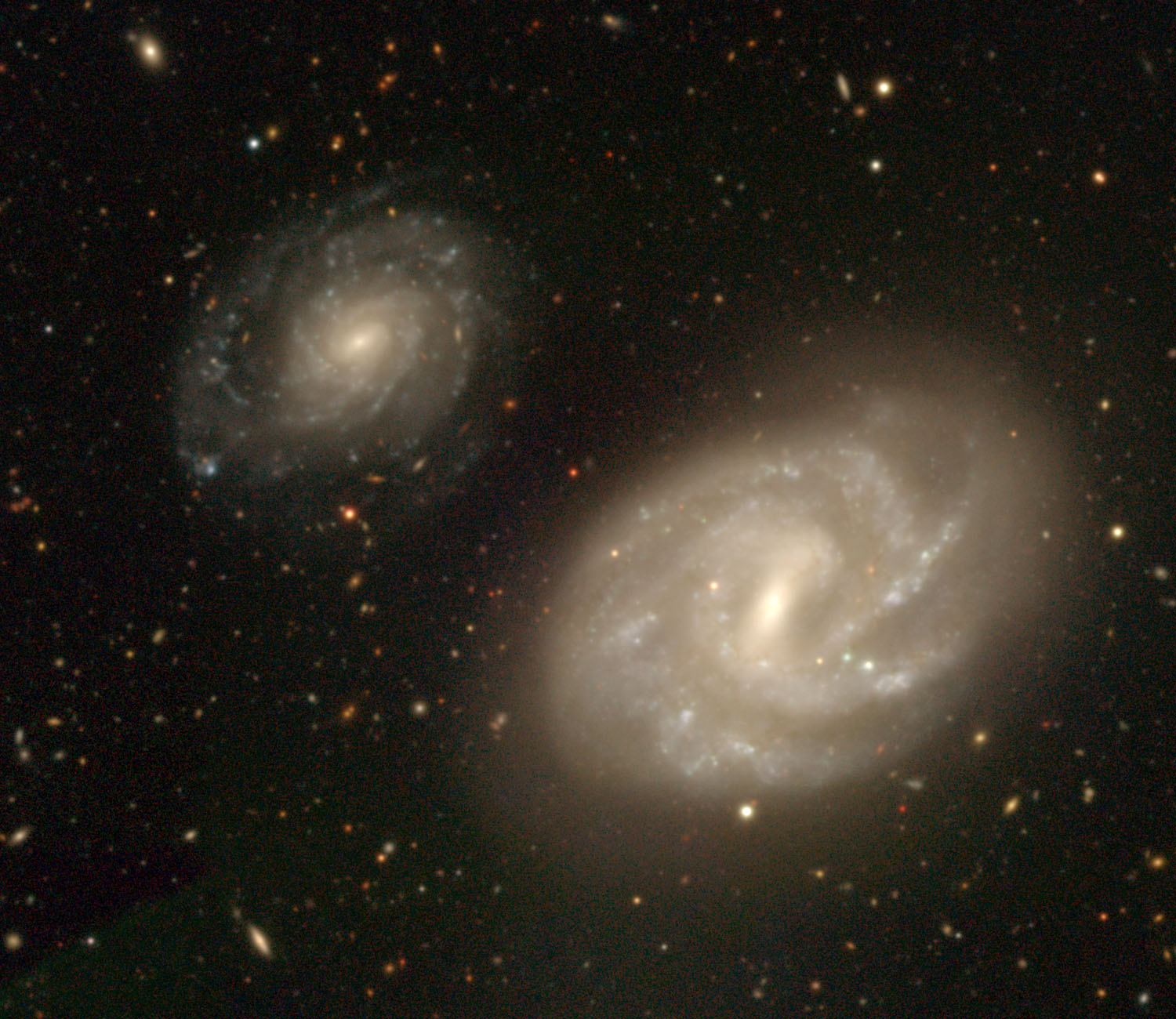
- IC 1953 (right) and ESO 548-40 (Legacy Surveys)

Observation data (J2000 epoch)
- Constellation: Eridanus
- Right ascension: 03^{h} 33^{m} 41.87^{s}
- Declination: −21° 28′ 43.1″
- Redshift: 0.006201
- Distance: 83.4 ± 5.9 Mly (25.56 ± 1.80 Mpc)
- Group or cluster: NGC 1395 Group (LGG 97)
- Apparent magnitude (V): 11.7

Characteristics
- Type: SB(rs)d
- Size: ~88,000 ly (27 kpc) (estimated)
- Apparent size (V): 2.9′ × 2.1′

Other designations
- IRAS 03314-2138, UGCA 78, MCG -04-09-026, PGC 13184, ESO 548- G 038

IC 1953 is a barred spiral galaxy situated in the constellation of Eridanus. Located about 83.4 million light years away, it is a member of the Eridanus Cluster of galaxies, a cluster of about 200 galaxies. It was discovered by DeLisle Stewart in 1899.

IC 1953 has a Hubble classification of SB(rs)d, which indicates it is a barred spiral galaxy. It is moving away from the Milky Way at a rate of 1,867 km/s. Its size in the night sky is 2.9' x 2.1', which is proportional to its estimated size of 88,000 ly.

== NGC 1395 Group ==
IC 1953 is part of the NGC 1395 group (also known as LGG 97), which includes at least 31 members, including: NGC 1315, NGC 1325, NGC 1331, NGC 1332, NGC 1347, NGC 1353, NGC 1371, NGC 1377, NGC 1385, NGC 1395, NGC 1401, NGC 1414, NGC 1415, NGC 1422, NGC 1426, NGC 1438, NGC 1439, IC 1952, and IC 1962. This group is also part of the Eridanus Cluster.
