= NGC 1415 =

- NGC 1415 imaged by Legacy Surveys

Observation data (J2000 epoch)
- Constellation: Eridanus
- Right ascension: 3^{h} 40^{m} 56.8487^{s}
- Declination: −22° 33′ 52.447″
- Redshift: 0.005177 ± 0.00000133
- Heliocentric radial velocity: 1552 ± 4 km/s
- Apparent magnitude (V): 12.47

Characteristics
- Type: (R)SAB0/a(s)
- Size: ~1,105,100 ly (338.84 kpc) (estimated)

Other designations
- IC 1983, PGC 13544

NGC 1415 (also known as IC 1983) is a Lenticular Galaxy in the constellation Eridanus. it was Discovered on Dec 9, 1784 by William Herschel (listed as NGC 1415) also observed on a unknown date by John Herschel and Discovered on Oct 8, 1896 by Lewis Swift (and listed as IC 1983)

== Observation ==
Observations from Hubble Space Telescope have allowed the presence of a star-forming disk around the nucleus of NGC 1415 to be detected. The size of its semi-major axis is estimated at about 940 pc (~3065 yr).

== NGC 1395 group ==
NGC 1415 is part of the NGC 1395 Group, which is included in the larger Eridanus Cluster, and which includes at least 31 galaxies, including NGC 1315, NGC 1325, NGC 1331, NGC 1332, NGC 1347, NGC 1353, NGC 1371, NGC 1377, NGC 1385, NGC 1395, NGC 1401, NGC 1414, NGC 1415, NGC 1422, NGC 1426, NGC 1438, NGC 1439, IC 1952, IC 1953 and IC 1962.

== See also ==
- List of NGC objects (1001-2000)
- List of NGC objects
