= Eridanus Cluster =

Galaxy cluster in the constellation Eridanus

Observation data (Epoch J2000)
- Constellation: Eridanus
- Right ascension: 03^{h} 28^{m} 13.8^{s}
- Declination: −20° 44′ 40″
- Brightest member: NGC 1232 (B)
- Number of galaxies: ~200
- Velocity dispersion: 261 km/s
- Redshift: 0.005570
- Distance: 23 Mpc (75 Mly)
- ICM temperature: ~10^{7} K (~1 keV)
- Binding mass: ~10^{14} M_{☉}
- X-ray flux: 0.105 mCrab

Other designations
- Fornax II Cluster, de Vaucouleurs Group 31

The spiral galaxy NGC 1232 is one of the brightest in the Eridanus Cluster.

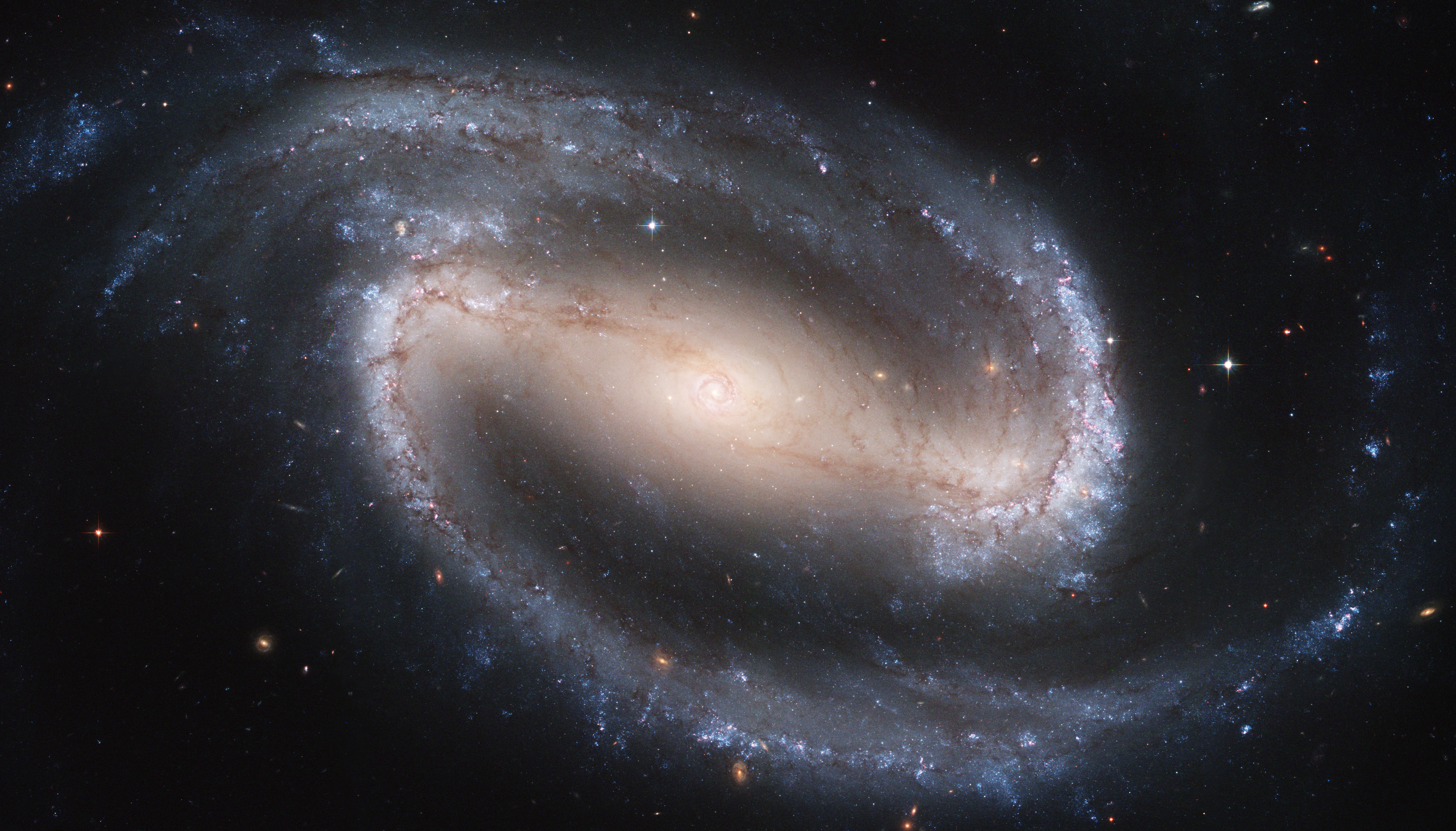
The barred spiral galaxy NGC 1300 is a well-known member of the Eridanus Cluster.

The Eridanus Cluster is a galaxy cluster roughly 23 Mpc (75 Mly) from Earth, containing about 73 main galaxies and about 200 total galaxies. About 30% have Hubble classifications of elliptical or S0 and the remaining 70% are spiral or irregular. These galaxies reside in smaller groups which are all loosely gravitationally bound to each other, suggesting that the system is still condensing from the Hubble flow and may eventually form a cluster of about 10^{14} M_{☉}. A low velocity dispersion compared to that of, for example, the Coma Cluster, supports this hypothesis. The Eridanus Cluster is located in the constellation Eridanus near the Fornax Cluster, and is sometimes called the "Fornax II Cluster".

== Table of galaxies ==
Designation	Coordinates (Epoch 2000)		Apparent magnitude (blue)	Type	Angular size (arcminutes)	Diameter (kly)	Recessional velocity (km/s)
Designation	RA	Dec	Apparent magnitude (blue)	Type	Angular size (arcminutes)	Diameter (kly)	Recessional velocity (km/s)
ESO 547-09	03 06.0	–19 23	16.8	Irr	1.3	35	1509
ESO 547-12	03 09.6	–17 50	16.5	Scd	1.5	35	1837
NGC 1232	03 09.8	–20 35	10.7	SAB(rs)c	6.9	170	1517
IC 1898	03 10.3	–22 24	13.7	SBc	3.4	85	1164
ESO 547-20	03 13.0	–17 56	16.0	SBm	1.2	30	1825
NGC 1258	03 14.1	–21 46	13.9	SBc	1.3	30	1340
NGC 1297	03 19.2	–19 06	13.5	E	2.0	50	1395
NGC 1300	03 19.7	–19 25	11.2	SBbc	6.0	110	1421
NGC 1315	03 23.1	–21 23	14.0	S0	1.5	35	1534
PGC 12680	03 23.4	–19 17	?	Irr	1.3	30	1400
ESO 548-05	03 23.8	–19 45	14.7	SBm	1.5	35	1690
NGC 1325	03 24.4	–21 33	12.3	SBbc	4.7	115	1446
NGC 1325A	03 24.8	–21 20	13.6	SBcd	1.8	45	1188
ESO 548-16	03 26.0	–21 20	15.6	Scd	1.7	40	1977
NGC 1332	03 26.3	–21 20	11.4	E	4.2	105	1383
ESO 548-21	03 27.6	–21 14	14.7	SBd	2.0	50	1541
ESO 548-25	03 29.0	–22 09	15.0	SBa	1.3	30	1542
NGC 1345	03 29.5	–17 47	14.3	SBc	1.4	35	1385
ESO 481-30	03 29.6	–23 21	15.5	Scd	1.5	35	1504
NGC 1347	03 29.7	–22 17	13.9	SBc	1.4	35	1624
ESO 548-28	03 30.6	–17 56	14.0	S0	1.3	35	1360
ESO 548-29	03 30.8	–21 03	14.3	SBbc	1.1	30	1175
NGC 1353	03 32.1	–20 49	12.4	SBb	3.5	85	1390
ESO 548-32	03 32.3	–17 43	15.8	SBm	1.6	40	1815
ESO 548-33	03 32.5	–18 57	14.5	S0	1.3	35	1552
ESO 548-34	03 33.0	–21 05	14.6	SBc	1.1	30	1610
ESO 482-05	03 33.0	–24 08	15.2	SBcd	2.1	50	1783
NGC 1357	03 33.2	–13 39	12.4	Sab	3.2	85	2018
IC 1952	03 33.4	–23 43	13.5	SBbc	2.5	60	1683
IC 1953	03 33.7	–21 29	12.7	SBc	2.6	65	1733
NGC 1359	03 33.8	–19 29	13.0	SBm	2.1	55	1833
NGC 1362	03 33.9	–20 17	14.2	S0	1.2	30	1085
ESO 548-44	03 34.3	–19 25	14.2	S0	1.3	35	1561
ESO 548-47	03 34.7	–19 02	14.1	S0	2.5	60	1472
NGC 1367	03 35.0	–24 56	11.6	SBa	5.6	140	1344
NGC 1370	03 35.2	–20 22	13.9	E	1.5	35	933
IC 1962	03 35.6	–21 18	14.8	SBd	2.5	60	1670
ESO 482-11	03 36.3	–25 36	14.7	Sbc	1.4	35	1469
NGC 1377	03 36.7	–20 54	13.8	S0	1.7	45	1645
NGC 1385	03 37.5	–24 30	11.5	SBc	3.7	90	1373
NGC 1383	03 37.7	–18 20	13.8	S0	1.7	40	1828
ESO 482-17	03 37.7	–22 55	14.9	Sab	1.3	30	1330
NGC 1390	03 37.9	–19 00	14.9	SBa	1.3	35	1078
NGC 1395	03 38.5	–23 02	10.7	E	5.6	140	1577
NGC 1398	03 38.9	–26 20	10.5	SB(r)ab	7.1	135	1289
NGC 1403	03 39.2	–22 23	14.1	E	1.3	30	1751
NGC 1401	03 39.4	–22 43	13.7	S0	1.9	50	1406
NGC 1400	03 39.5	–18 41	12.3	E	2.3	60	415
ESO 548-63	03 39.6	–20 01	15.1	Sbc	1.4	35	1846
ESO 548-65	03 40.0	–19 22	15.3	Sa	1.4	35	1102
IC 343	03 40.1	–18 27	14.3	S0	1.4	35	1730
NGC 1407	03 40.2	–18 35	10.9	E	5.1	125	1650
ESO 548-68	03 40.3	–18 56	14.3	E	1.3	35	1636
NGC 1412	03 40.5	–26 52	14.7	S0	1.4	35	1675
ESO 548-70	03 40.7	–22 17	15.4	SBcd	1.6	40	1615
ESO 482-32	03 40.7	–26 47	15.9	Irr	1.2	30	1621
NGC 1415	03 40.9	–22 34	12.8	Sa	3.3	80	1451
NGC 1414	03 41.0	–21 43	14.6	SBbc	1.6	40	1464
ESO 482-35	03 41.2	–23 50	14.2	SBab	1.8	45	1756
NGC 1422	03 41.5	–21 41	14.2	SBab	2.3	55	1514
IC 346	03 41.7	–18 16	13.9	S0	1.9	45	1830
ESO 548-79	03 41.9	–18 54	14.8	Sa	1.1	30	1914
ESO 548-82	03 42.7	–17 30	15.4	Sbc	1.1	30	1590
NGC 1426	03 42.8	–22 06	12.7	E	2.5	60	1296
ESO 549-02	03 43.0	–19 01	14.9	SBm	1.3	30	988
ESO 549-06	03 43.6	–21 14	15.7	Irr	1.3	30	1490
NGC 1439	03 44.8	–21 55	12.4	E	2.6	65	1577
NGC 1440	03 45.0	–18 16	12.9	S0	2.2	55	1403
NGC 1438	03 45.3	–23 00	13.3	SBa	2.0	50	1438
NGC 1452	03 45.4	–18 38	12.9	Sa	2.3	60	1619
ESO 549-18	03 48.2	–21 28	13.3	SBc	2.5	60	1473
ESO 482-46	03 49.7	–27 00	13.7	Sc	3.5	90	1422
ESO 482-49	03 52.4	–23 03	15.3	Sc	1.1	30	1377
NGC 1482	03 54.6	–20 30	13.3	S0	2.2	55	1753

== See also ==
- List of galaxy clusters
- Coma Cluster
- Fornax Cluster
- Norma Cluster
- Virgo Cluster
