= NGC 7080 =

Galaxy in the constellation Vulpecula

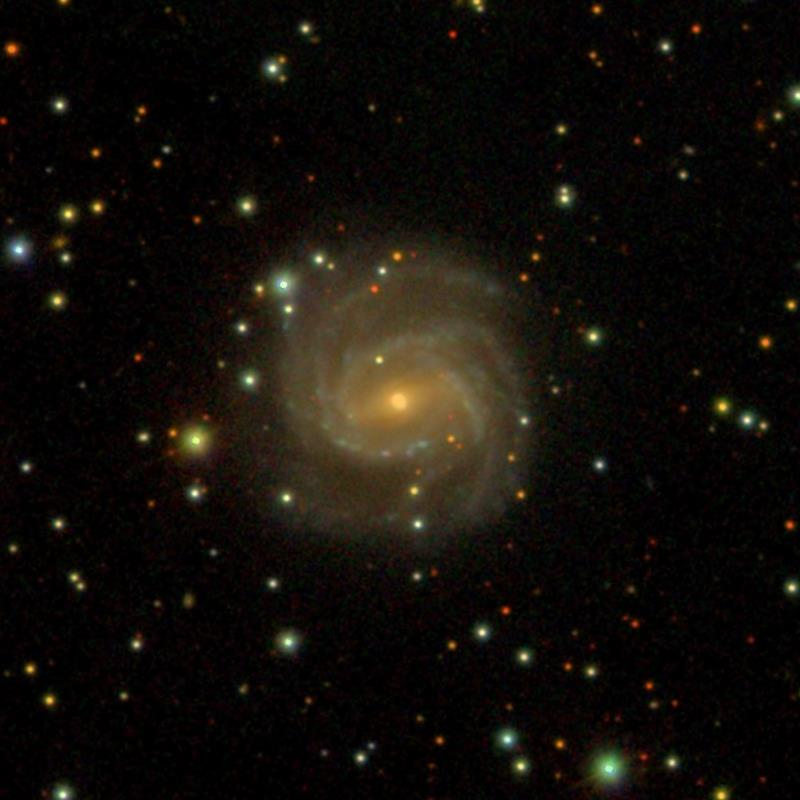
- SDSS image of NGC 7080.

Observation data (J2000 epoch)
- Constellation: Vulpecula
- Right ascension: 21^{h} 30^{m} 01.9^{s}
- Declination: 26° 43′ 04″
- Redshift: 0.016141
- Heliocentric radial velocity: 4,839 km/s
- Distance: 204.5 Mly
- Apparent magnitude (V): 12.3

Characteristics
- Type: SB(r)b
- Size: ~104,384 ly (estimated)
- Apparent size (V): 1.8' x 1.7'

Other designations
- CGCG 471-11, IRAS 21278+2629, MCG 4-50-12, NPM1G +26.0474, PGC 66861, UGC 11756

NGC 7080 is a barred spiral galaxy located about 204.5 million light-years away in the constellation of Vulpecula. It has an estimated diameter of about 100,000 light-years which would make it similar in size to the Milky Way. NGC 7080 was discovered by astronomer Albert Marth on September 6, 1863.

According to Harold Corwin, NGC 7054 is a duplicate observation of NGC 7080.

== Supernova ==
One supernova has been observed in NGC 7080:

- SN 1998ey (Type Ic-pec, mag.16.8) was discovered by Ron Arbour on 5 December 1998.

== See also ==
- NGC 1300
