= NGC 1232 =

Galaxy in the constellation Eridanus

- NGC 1232 by ESO

Observation data (J2000 epoch)
- Constellation: Eridanus
- Right ascension: 03^{h} 09^{m} 45.4322^{s}
- Declination: −20° 34′ 44.443″
- Redshift: 0.005347
- Heliocentric radial velocity: 1603 ± 1 km/s
- Distance: 50.33 ± 2.84 Mly (15.432 ± 0.870 Mpc)
- Apparent magnitude (V): 10.9

Characteristics
- Type: SAB(rs)c
- Size: 145,300 ly (44.57 kpc) (estimated)
- Apparent size (V): 7′.4 × 6′.5
- Notable features: Discrepant galaxy pair with NGC 1232 A

Other designations
- PGC 11819, Arp 41

NGC 1232, also known as the Eye of God Galaxy is an intermediate spiral galaxy about 50 million light-years away in the constellation Eridanus. It was discovered by German-British astronomer William Herschel on 20 October 1784.

It is dominated by millions of bright stars and dark dust, in spiral arms rotating about the center. Open clusters containing bright blue stars are sprinkled along these spiral arms, with dark lanes of dense interstellar dust between. Less visible are dimmer stars and interstellar gas, comprising such a high mass that they dominate the dynamics of the inner galaxy. Not visible is matter of unknown form called dark matter, needed to explain the motions of the visible material in the outer galaxy. The galaxy is approximately 150,000 light-years across. The galaxy's spiral arms are not smooth and perturbed, leading to some suggesting a collision with a dwarf galaxy. However, some studies doubt this suggestion.

NGC 1232 and its apparent companions are possibly part of the Eridanus Cluster of galaxies, along with NGC 1300.

== Description and structure ==
NGC 1232 is a face-on spiral galaxy. It can be technically considered a grand-design galaxy and is considered a prototype for multi-arm spiral galaxies. Its galactic bulge is small. While NGC 1232 is classified as an intermediate spiral galaxy, the bulge shows hints of a galactic bar.

=== Spiral arms ===
NGC 1232's spiral arms are bright and flocculent, winding counterclockwise from the galactic center. They contain numerous HII regions. At large distances from the galaxy's center, the spiral arms either branch out and disperse, producing long spiral arms, or connect with arm segments. However, they are not smooth as expected for a spiral galaxy. Instead, they bend abruptly and show significant deviations from a constant pitch. In fact, the same pitch angle cannot be applied to one arm due to the arms deviating. Astronomer Halton Arp suggested that this is the result of a galaxy interaction. That the galaxy contains numerous star-forming regions makes it an excellent laboratory when it comes to studies on star formation.

Most of NGC 1232's arms and arm segments widen as they get farther and farther away from the galaxy's center with only one arm or arm segment, designated as arm segment "E", narrowing as it gets further from the center. This is likely due to less and less star formation occurring at farther distances from the galaxy's center, or it may be because the spiral arm reaches a point where the spiral pattern starts to co-rotate orbiting material.

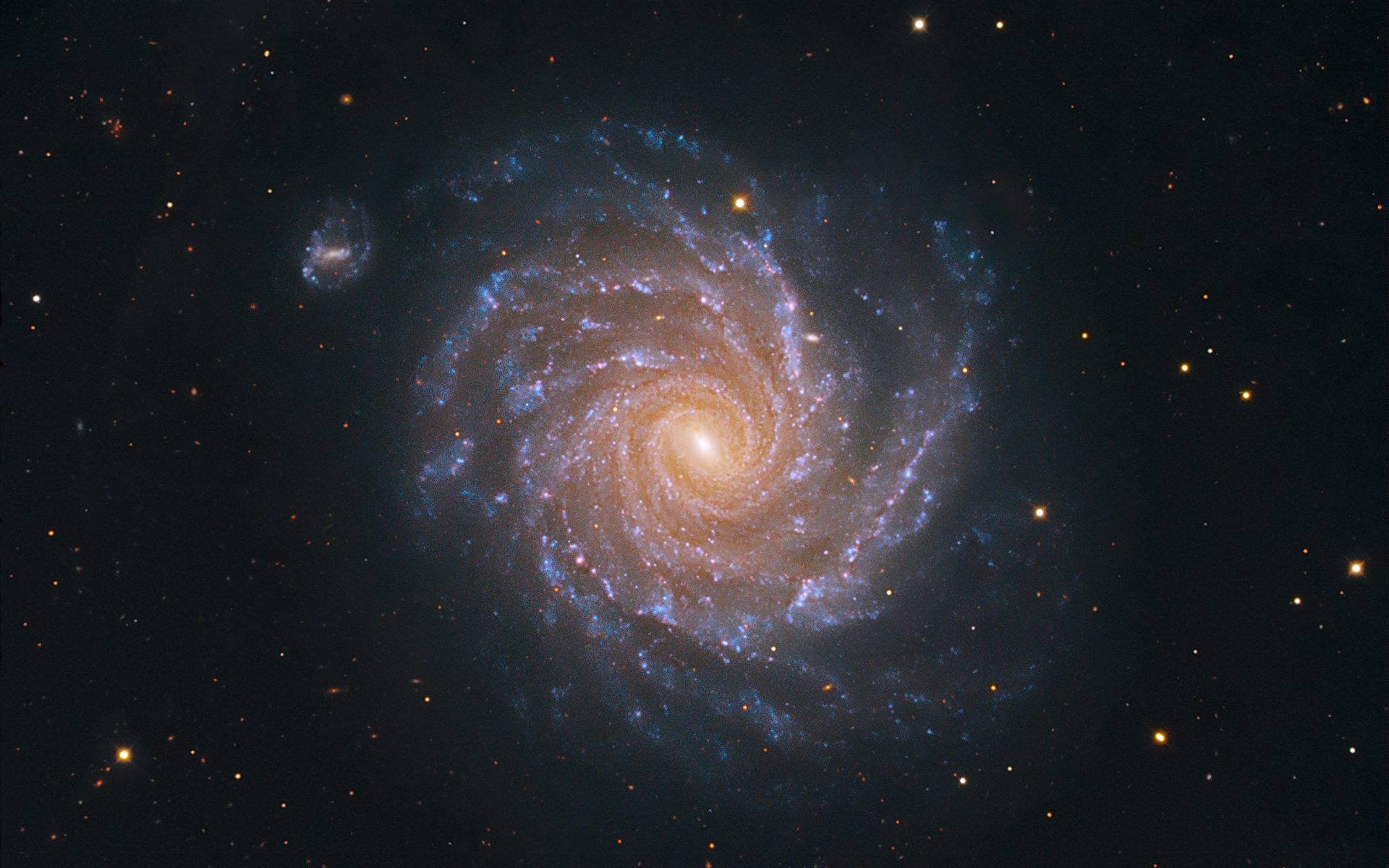
An image of NGC 1232. The arm segment designated as "E" is at the right-most bright spiral arm of the galaxy. Note the number of arms.

=== Association with the Eridanus cluster ===
NGC 1232 and NGC 1232 A may both be associated with the Eridanus cluster of galaxies, but with a distance of around 2.2 million parsecs from the cluster's center, they may not be bound to the cluster.

== Debated collision with another dwarf galaxy and association with NGC 1232A ==
It was originally thought that one of NGC 1232's companions, NGC 1232A, was interacting with NGC 1232 and causing perturbations within its disk, as NGC 1232A seems to be a satellite galaxy of NGC 1232 at first sight, but this is likely not the case. In 1988, NGC 1232A was estimated to be 68 million light-years away while NGC 1232 was estimated to be 65 million light-years away. The redshifts of the two galaxies do not match, which suggest that they likely never interacted before and are not currently interacting. The discrepant redshifts for the two galaxies is one of the reasons why the pair is known as one of the most striking examples for discrepant redshifts in galaxy pairs. Instead, X-Ray studies suggest that NGC 1232 may have interacted with a dwarf galaxy, but the dwarf galaxy has apparently left no remnant.

X-Ray observations over a three-year period made by the Chandra X-ray observatory also suggest that there was an interaction between NGC 1232 and another dwarf galaxy, commenting on a massive cloud of gas only visible in the X-ray superimposed on NGC 1232's images. The paper concludes that this may be the first case of the dwarf galaxy-large galaxy collision whose evidence is only visible in the X-Ray. However, it is noted that this may be due to other causes, such as numerous supernovae, but the study also suggests that there is no other evidence for this. As a result, an interaction with another galaxy, other than NGC 1232A, is sometimes thought to be the cause of unusual bending in the spiral arms. In 2018, a study of the star formation rates in NGC 1232 took images of the galaxy in Hydrogen Alpha, finding over 970 HII regions. It is remarked that there is a concentration of HII regions in one part of the galaxy, but when the star-formation rates are taken into account, the concentration is more diluted. The study found that X-Ray emissions may be quenching star formation in some areas of the galaxy, because there seems to be lower concentration of HII regions there. The amount of HII regions seems to be higher in areas without much X-ray emission. Both of these were suggested to have been caused by a collision with another galaxy.

In contrast with previous studies, a recent X-Ray study remarks that the hot gas luminosity in NGC 1232 is not very high. According to the study, the cloud claimed to be superimposed on NGC 1232 does not exist, and that peculiarities in NGC 1232's HII regions are just coincidental. The study notes that NGC 1232's disk is not very warped. Thus, the study concludes that there was no interaction between either NGC 1232A or another dwarf galaxy and NGC 1232 at all.

== See also ==
- NGC 1097 – a barred spiral galaxy
- Pinwheel Galaxy – a grand-design spiral galaxy
- Whirlpool Galaxy – another grand design spiral galaxy
