= NGC 7479 =

Galaxy in the constellation Pegasus

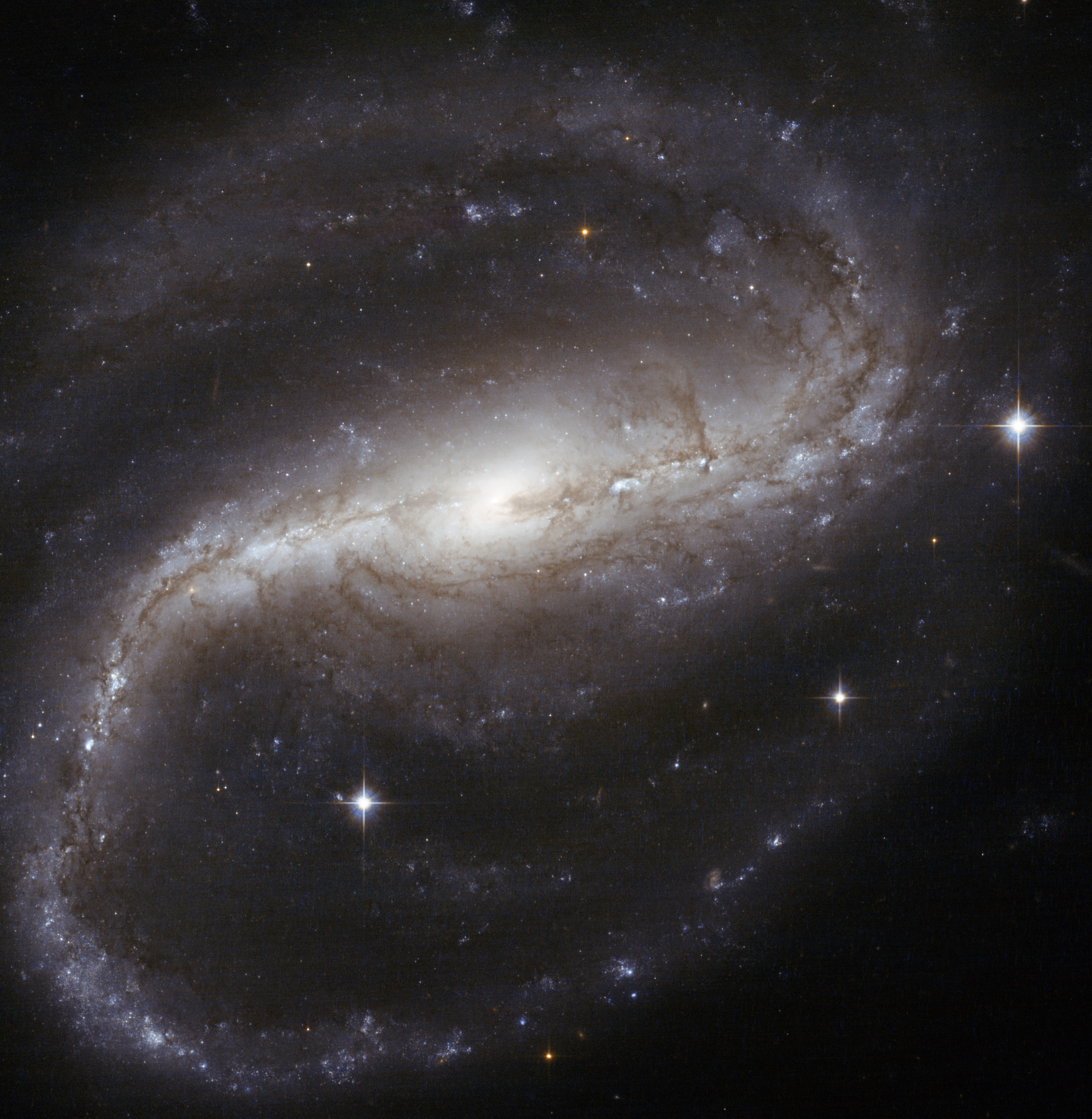
- NGC 7479 imaged by the Wide Field Channel of Hubble's Advanced Camera for Surveys

Observation data (J2000 epoch)
- Constellation: Pegasus
- Right ascension: 23^{h} 04^{m} 56.6^{s}
- Declination: +12° 19′ 22″
- Redshift: 2381 ± 1 km/s
- Distance: 105 Mly
- Apparent magnitude (V): 11.6

Characteristics
- Type: SB(s)c
- Size: 118,000 ly (36.2 kpc)
- Apparent size (V): 4.1′ × 3.1′

Other designations
- Caldwell 44, UGC 12343, PGC 70419

NGC 7479 (also known as Caldwell 44 or the Superman Galaxy) is a barred spiral galaxy about 105 million light-years away in the constellation Pegasus. William Herschel discovered it in 1784. NGC 7479 is also recognized as a Seyfert galaxy and a LINER undergoing starburst activity not only on the nucleus and the outer arms, but also across the bar of the galaxy, where most of the stars were formed in the last 100 million years. Polarization studies of this galaxy indicate that it recently underwent a minor merger and that it is unique in the radio continuum, with arms opening in a direction opposite to the optical arms. This feature, along with the asymmetrical arms of the galaxy and the intense star formation activity are attributed to a merger with a smaller galaxy. This galaxy is similar in both size and morphology to the barred spiral NGC 1300.

== Supernovae ==
Two supernovae have been observed in NGC 7479:

- SN 1990U (Type Ic, mag. 16) was discovered by the Berkeley Automated Supernova Search on 27 July 1990.
- SN 2009jf (Type Ib, mag. 18) was discovered by the Lick Observatory Supernova Search (LOSS) on 27 September 2009.
