= NGC 1258 =

Spiral galaxy in the constellation Eridanus

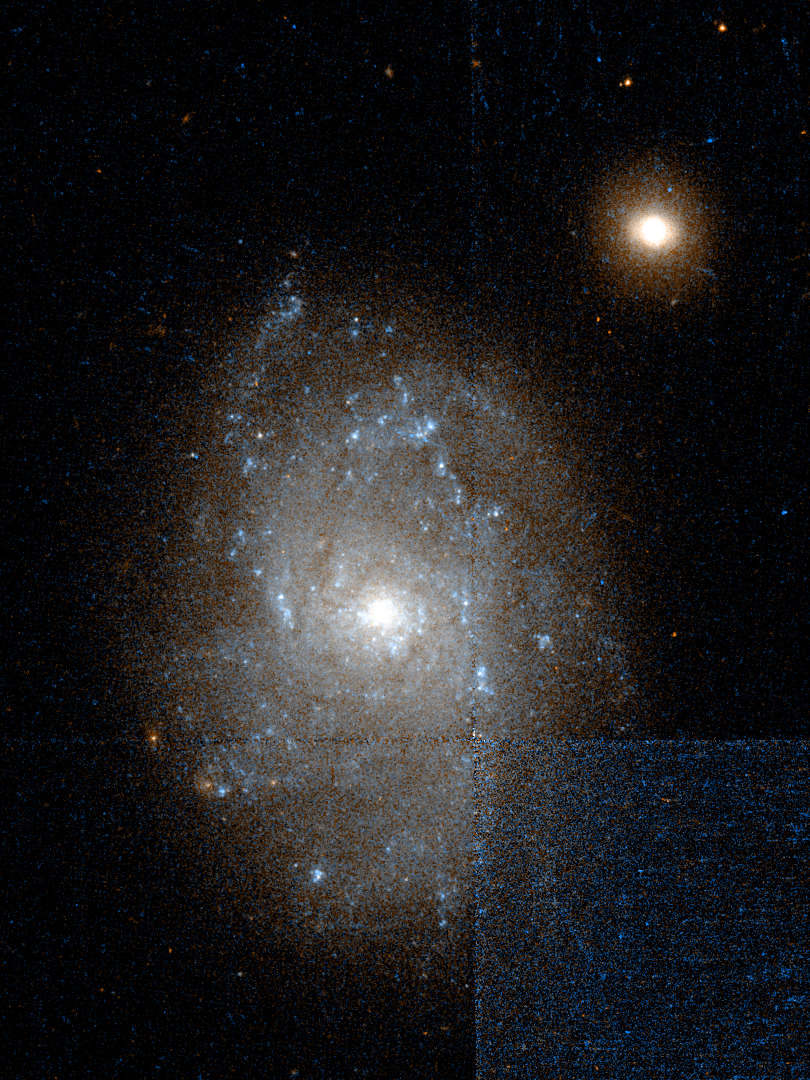

Observation data (J2000 epoch)
- Constellation: Eridanus
- Right ascension: 03^{h} 14^{m} 05.472^{s}
- Declination: –21° 46′ 27.20″
- Distance: 83.1 Mly (25.5 Mpc)
- Group or cluster: Eridanus Cluster
- Apparent magnitude (B): 13.98
- Surface brightness: 23.11 mag/arcsec2

Characteristics
- Type: SBc
- Size: 100,000 ly

Other designations
- MCG -4-8-53, PGC 12034
- References: theskylive.com, Universeguide.com

NGC 1258 is an intermediate spiral galaxy in the Eridanus Cluster. NGC 1258's distance from Earth is 83.1 Mly (25.5 Mpc).
