= SN 1990U =

Supernova in the galaxy NGC 7479

- Event type: Supernova
- SN Ic
- Discovered: July 27, 1990
- Constellation: Pegasus
- Right ascension: 23^{h} 04^{m} 54.96^{s}
- Declination: +12° 18′ 20.1″
- Epoch: J2000.0
- Galactic coordinates: 086.2501 -42.8526
- Distance: 105,000,000 ly
- Redshift: 0.00794
- Host: NGC 7479
- Peak apparent magnitude: 16±0.5
- Other designations: SN 1990U

SN 1990U was a Type Ic supernova event in the nucleus of the galaxy NGC 7479. It was discovered July 27, 1990 by the Berkeley Automated Supernova Search after reaching magnitude 16±0.5. Initially this was classified as a Type Ib supernova, but the weakness of the neutral helium absorption lines led to a reclassification.
