= Flocculent spiral galaxy =

Patchy galaxy with discontinuous spiral arms

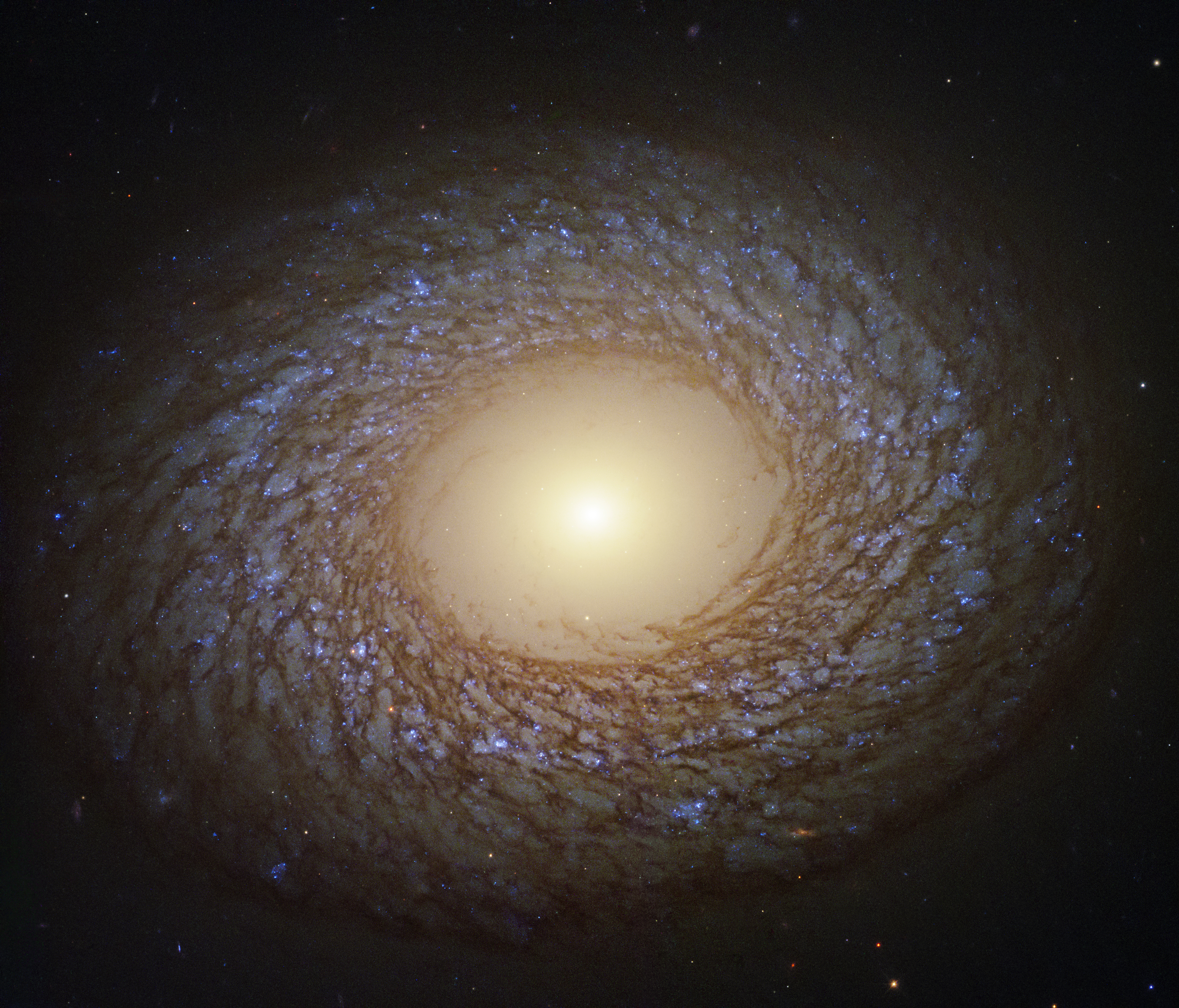
NGC 2775, a prominent flocculent spiral galaxy

A flocculent spiral galaxy is a type of spiral galaxy. Unlike the well-defined spiral architecture of a grand design spiral galaxy, flocculent (meaning "fluffy") galaxies are patchy, with discontinuous spiral arms. Self-propagating star formation is the apparent explanation for the structure of flocculent spirals. Approximately 30% of spirals are flocculent, 10% are grand design, and the rest are referred to as "multi-armed". The multiple-arm type is sometimes grouped into the flocculent category.

The prototypical flocculent spiral is NGC 2841.

== List of flocculent spiral galaxies ==
Example	Class	Image	Constellation	Notes
NGC 1325	SBbc		Eridanus	
NGC 1353	SBb		Eridanus	
NGC 2775	SA(r)ab		Cancer	
NGC 2841	SA(r)b		Ursa Major	
NGC 3521	SAB(r s)bc		Leo	
NGC 4298	SA(r s)c		Coma Berenices	
NGC 4414	SA(r s)c		Coma Berenices	
NGC 7793	SA(s)d		Sculptor	
Sunflower Galaxy (Messier 63)	SAB(r s)cd		Canes Venatici	

== Sources ==
- PDF A Near-Infrared Atlas of Spiral Galaxies, Debra Meloy Elmegreen, 1981, doi:10.1086/190757, Bibcode:1981ApJS...47..229E
