= NGC 1300 =

Galaxy in the constellation Eridanus

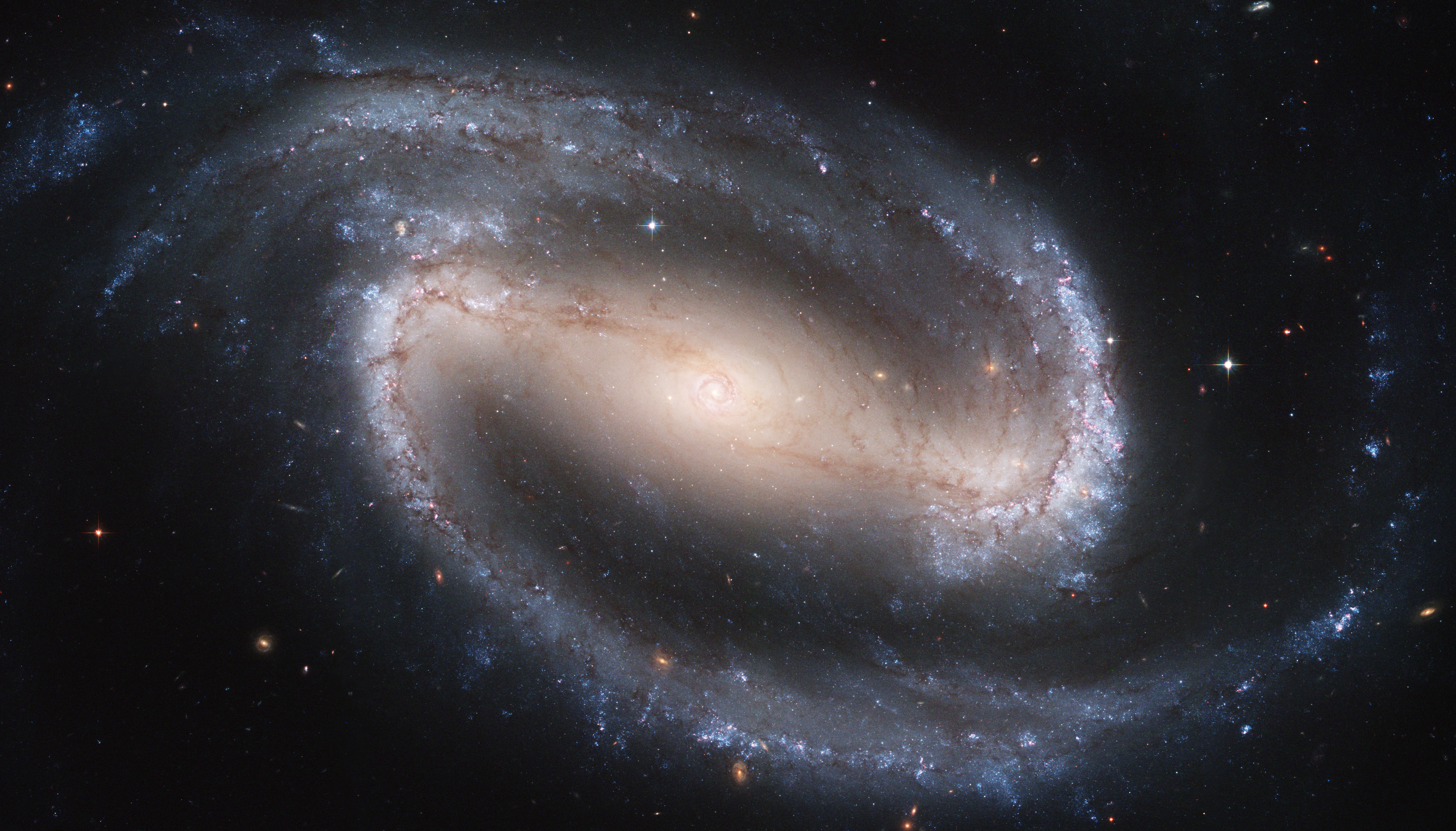
- NGC 1300 imaged by the Hubble Space Telescope

Observation data (J2000 epoch)
- Constellation: Eridanus
- Right ascension: 03^{h} 19^{m} 41.0253^{s} (49.920939)
- Declination: −19° 24′ 40.149″ (−19.411153)
- Redshift: 0.005260 (1577 ± 4 km/s)
- Distance: 61.3 Mly (18.8 Mpc)
- Apparent magnitude (V): 11.4

Characteristics
- Type: (R')SB(s)bc
- Size: 130,000 ly (39.40 kpc) (estimated)
- Apparent size (V): 6.2′ × 4.1′
- Notable features: Huge bar-shaped core and two spiral arms

Other designations
- ESO 547 -G 31, IRAS 03174-1935, UGCA 66, MCG -03-09-018, PGC 12412

NGC 1300 is a barred spiral galaxy located about 69 million light-years away in the constellation Eridanus. The galaxy is about 130,000 light-years across. It is a member of the Eridanus Cluster, a cluster of 200 galaxies, in a subgroup of 2–4 galaxies in the cluster known as the NGC 1300 Group. It was discovered by British astronomer John Herschel on 11 December 1835.

== Nucleus ==
In the core of the larger spiral structure of NGC 1300, the nucleus shows a "grand-design" spiral structure that is about 3,300 light-years long. Only galaxies with large-scale bars appear to have these grand-design inner disks — a spiral within a spiral. Models suggest that the gas in a bar can be funneled inwards, and then spiral into the center through the grand-design disk, where it can potentially fuel a central supermassive black hole (SMBH). NGC 1300 is not known to have an active nucleus, indicating that its central black hole is not accreting matter. The SMBH has a mass of 7.3+6.9
−3.5×10^{7} M_{☉}.

== Supernova ==
One supernova has been observed in NGC 1300:

- SN 2022acko (Type II-P, mag. 16.5406) was discovered by the Distance Less Than 40 Mpc Survey (DLT40) on 6 December 2022. Using images from the James Webb Space Telescope and the Hubble Space Telescope, the progenitor was tentatively identified as a red supergiant with an estimated mass of 7.7 M_{☉}.

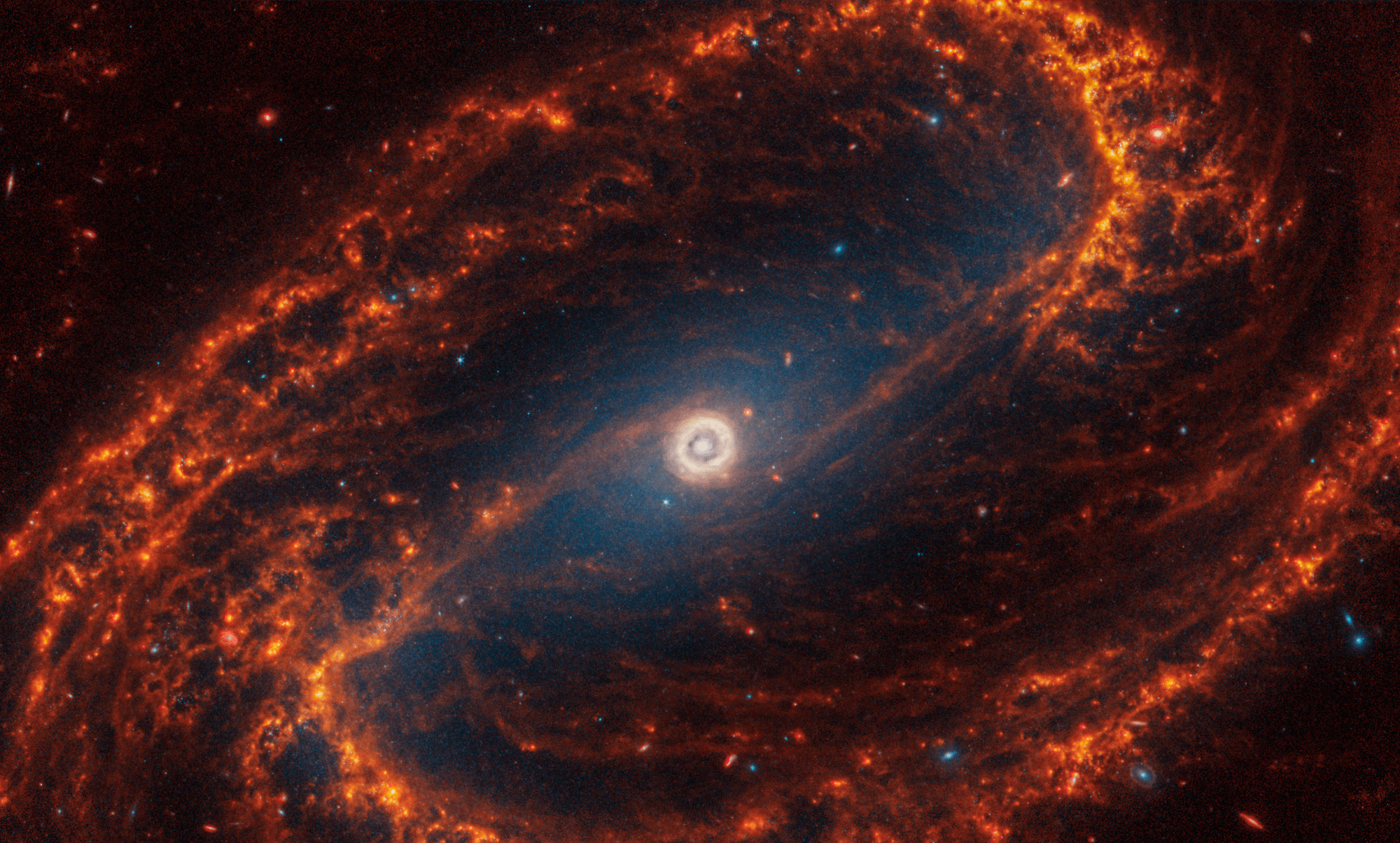
Infrared observation of spiral galaxy NGC1300 in the constellation Eridanus.

== See also ==
- NGC 1672, a similar spiral galaxy
- NGC 7479, a galaxy with a very similar structure and both size and morphology similar
- NGC 1232, a nearby intermediate spiral galaxy
