= NGC 1482 =

Galaxy in the constellation Eridanus

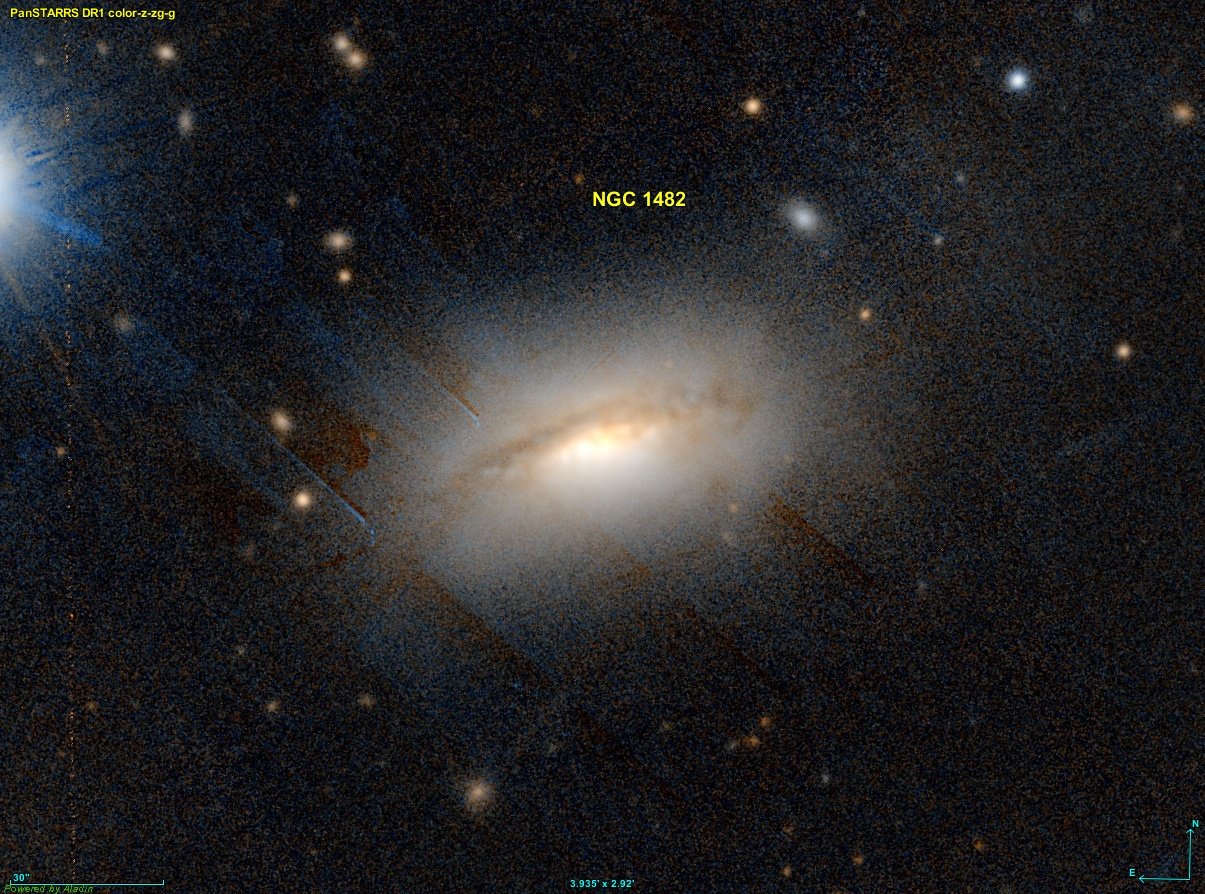
- NGC 1482 imaged by Pan-STARRS

Observation data (J2000 epoch)
- Constellation: Eridanus
- Right ascension: 03^{h} 54^{m} 38.9804^{s}
- Declination: −20° 30′ 08.011″
- Redshift: 0.006391
- Heliocentric radial velocity: 1312 ± 9 km/s
- Distance: 87.4 ± 6.7 Mly (26.81 ± 2.05 Mpc)
- Apparent magnitude (V): 12.2

Characteristics
- Type: SA0^+ pec edge-on
- Size: ~89,400 ly (27.40 kpc) (estimated)
- Apparent size (V): 2.4′ × 1.4′

Other designations
- ESO 549- G 033, IRAS 03524-2038, 2MASX J03543892-2030088, MCG -03-10-054, PGC 14084

NGC 1482 is a lenticular galaxy in the constellation of Eridanus. Its velocity with respect to the cosmic microwave background is 1817 ± 40 km/s, which corresponds to a Hubble distance of 87.4 ± 6.7 Mly (26.81 ± 2.05 Mpc). In addition, one non-redshift measurement gives a distance of 64 Mly (19.6 Mpc). It was discovered by German-British astronomer William Herschel on 19 December 1799.

== Supernova ==
One supernova has been observed in NGC 1482. SN 1937E (type unknown, mag. 16.5) was discovered by Fritz Zwicky on 26 November 1937.

== See also ==
- List of NGC objects (1001–2000)
