= NGC 1345 =

Galaxy in the constellation Eridanus

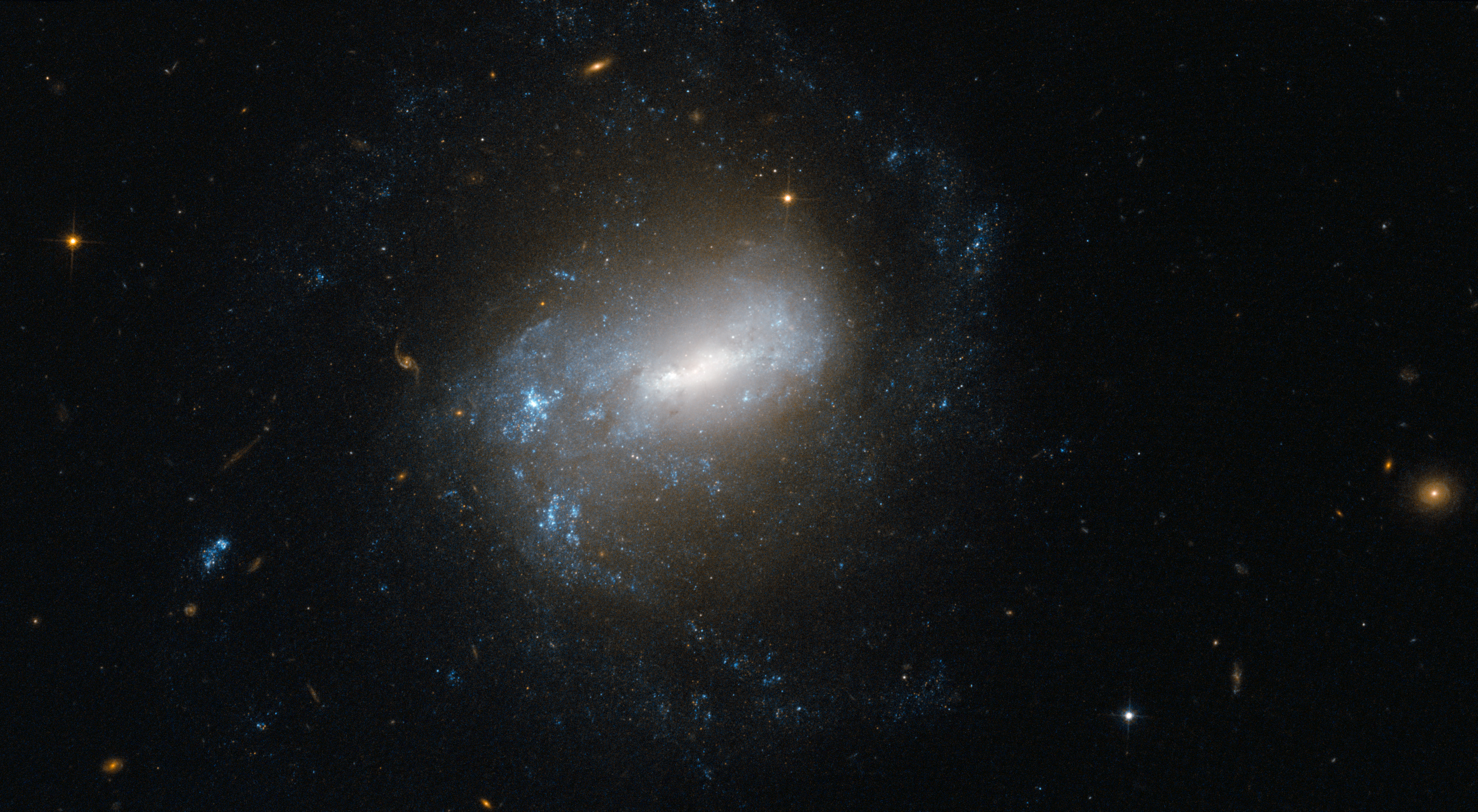
- Hubble Space Telescope image of NGC 1345

Observation data (J2000 epoch)
- Constellation: Eridanus
- Right ascension: 03^{h} 29^{m} 31^{s}
- Declination: −17° 46′ 42″
- Redshift: 0.005101
- Heliocentric radial velocity: 1529 ± 6 km/s
- Apparent magnitude (B): 13.67

Characteristics
- Type: SB(s)c pec

Other designations
- NGC 1345, UGCA 74, ESO 548- G 026, VV 690, HARO 21, MCG -03-09-046, LEDA 12979, IRAS 03272-1756

NGC 1345 is a barred spiral galaxy in the constellation Eridanus. It was discovered by John Herschel on Dec 11, 1835.

== See also ==
- List of NGC objects (1001–2000)
