= NGC 1395 =

Galaxy in the constellation Eridanus

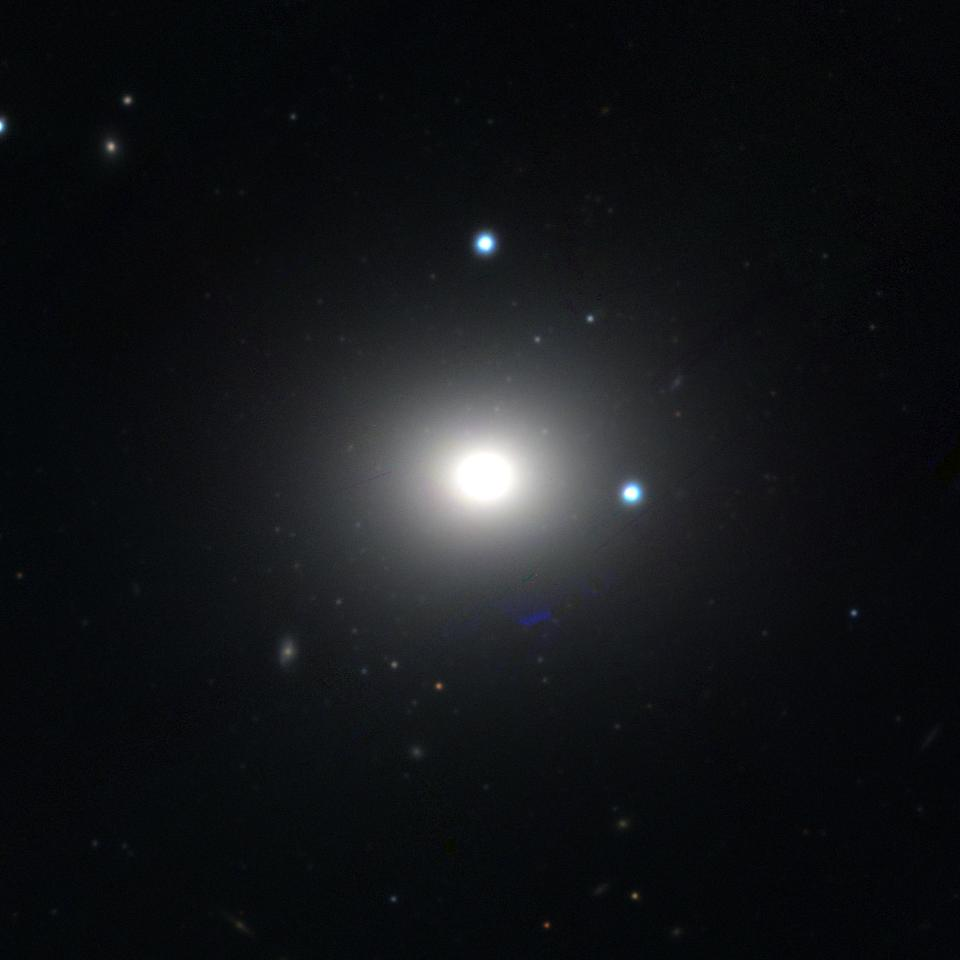
- NGC 1395 by PanSTARRS

Observation data (J2000 epoch)
- Constellation: Eridanus
- Right ascension: 03^{h} 38^{m} 29.8^{s}
- Declination: −23° 01′ 39″
- Redshift: 0.005727 +/- 0.000022
- Heliocentric radial velocity: 1,717 ± 7 km/s
- Distance: 74.4 ± 17.8 Mly (22.8 ± 5.4 Mpc)
- Apparent magnitude (V): 9.8

Characteristics
- Type: E2
- Apparent size (V): 5.9′ × 4.5′

Other designations
- ESO 482- G019, AM 0336-231, MCG -04-09-039, PGC 13419

NGC 1395 is an elliptical galaxy located in the constellation Eridanus. It is located at a distance of circa 75 million light years from Earth, which, given its apparent dimensions, means that NGC 1395 is about 130,000 light years across. It was discovered by William Herschel on November 17, 1784. It is a member of the Eridanus Cluster.

== Characteristics ==
In the centre of NGC 1395 lies a supermassive black hole whose mass is estimated to be 3.9×10^{8} (10^{8.59}) M_{☉} based on the M–sigma relation or between 100 and 257 million (10^{8} – 10^{8.41}) M_{☉} based on the Sérsic index of the galaxy. NGC 1395 emits X-rays which have been observed by Chandra X-ray Observatory and XMM-Newton. The luminosity of the galaxy in X-rays is 3×10^{40} ergs and is believed it is emitted by hot gas with total mass 4.1×10^{8} M_{☉}. One other source of X-ray emission in early type galaxies are X-ray binary stars, with 24 sources being detected in the inner area of NGC 1395.

NGC 1395 is home to a large number of globular clusters, with their total number estimated to be 6000±1100, compared to 150–200 in and around the Milky Way. There are two different populations of globular clusters in the galaxy, named blue and red from their photometric color. The clusters of the red subpopulation lie closer to the centre of the galaxy while the blue ones lie mostly in the halo. The surface density profile of the blue globular clusters indicates that the galaxy has accreted a significant number of dwarf satellites.

David Malin and Dave Carter discovered in 1983 low contrast shells in the bright envelope of NGC 1395. The brightest shell lies 3 arcminutes northwest of the galactic centre. A perpendicular feature is seen also in deep imaging in the northwest part of the galaxy. Features like these are indicative of recent accretion of a smaller galaxy in the recent past.

== Nearby galaxies ==
NGC 1395 is part of the Eridanus Cluster and is the brightest member of the NGC 1395 subgroup. Other members of this subgroup are the galaxies IC 1952, NGC 1401, NGC 1414, NGC 1415, NGC 1422, NGC 1426, NGC 1438, and NGC 1439.
