= NGC 1403 =

Galaxy in the constellation Eridanus

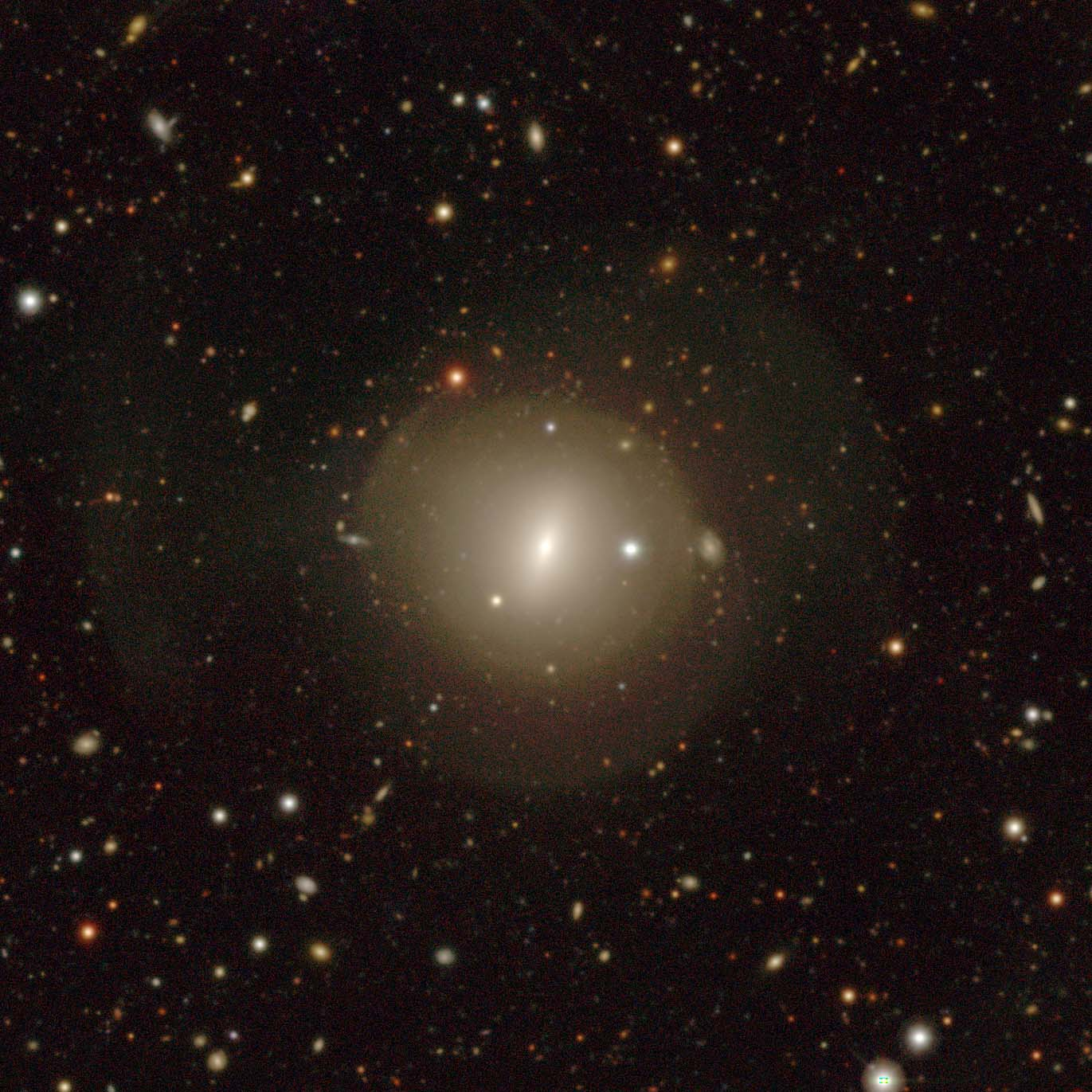
- legacy surveys image of NGC 1403

Observation data (J2000 epoch)
- Constellation: Eridanus
- Right ascension: 03^{h} 39^{m} 10.876^{s}
- Declination: −22° 23′ 19.00″
- Redshift: 0.014320
- Heliocentric radial velocity: 4293 km/s
- Distance: 146.93 ± 15.91 Mly (45.050 ± 4.879 Mpc)
- Apparent magnitude (V): 12.74
- Apparent magnitude (B): 13.86
- Absolute magnitude (V): −20.52

Characteristics
- Type: SAB(s)0^{0}
- Apparent size (V): 0.950′ × 0.741′

Other designations
- MGC-04-09-041, PGC 13445

NGC 1403 is a lenticular or elliptical galaxy in the constellation Eridanus. It was discovered in 1886 by Francis Preserved Leavenworth. It was thought to be a "very faint, extremely small, nebulous star" by John Louis Emil Dreyer, the compiler of the New General Catalogue.

== See also ==
- Spiral galaxy
- List of NGC objects (1–1000)
- Eridanus (constellation)
