= NGC 1367 =

Galaxy in the constellation Fornax

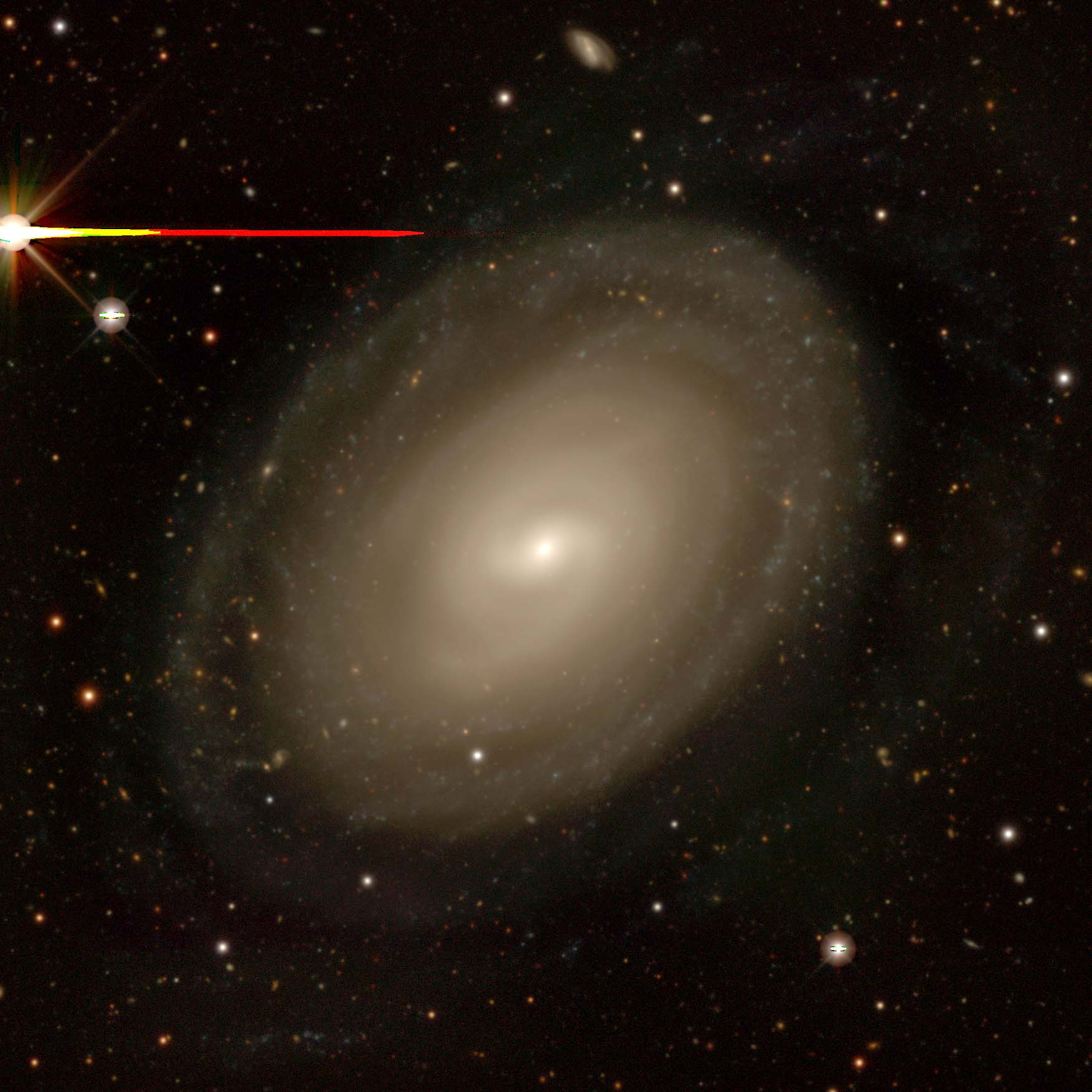
- NGC 1367 by Legacy Surveys DR10

Observation data (J2000 epoch)
- Constellation: Fornax
- Right ascension: 03^{h} 35^{m} 01.3^{s}
- Declination: −24° 55′ 59″
- Redshift: 0.004880 ± 0.000007
- Heliocentric radial velocity: 1,463 ± 2 km/s
- Distance: 77.6 ± 17.8 Mly (23.8 ± 5.5 Mpc)
- Group or cluster: Eridanus Cluster
- Apparent magnitude (V): 10.7

Characteristics
- Type: (R')SAB(r'l)a
- Apparent size (V): 5.6′ × 3.9′
- Notable features: Active galactic nucleus

Other designations
- NGC 1371, UGCA 79, ESO 482- G 010, AM 0332-250, MCG -04-09-029, IRAS F03328-2505, PGC 13255

NGC 1367 or NGC 1371 is a spiral galaxy in the constellation Fornax. The galaxy lies about 75 million light years away from Earth, which means, given its apparent dimensions, that NGC 1367 is approximately 130,000 light years across. It was discovered by William Herschel on November 17, 1784, and independently by Ormond Stone in 1886. It is a member of the Eridanus Cluster.

== Characteristics ==
The galaxy is seen inclined, at an angle of 47.5°. It has a bright bulge featuring a weak bar with ansae at its ends from where low surface brightness arms with no obvious knots emerge. H-alpha imaging shows the presence of HII regions in the arms and a circumnuclear ring, surrounding a central source. The galaxy has a faint outer ring. Star formation takes place in the outer arms of the galaxy while the bulge does not appear to be forming stars at a significant rate.

The galaxy has a disk with X-ray emission, measuring 31 by 16 arcseconds, and faint diffuse X-ray emission extending beyond it. The inner disk emission could be due to supernova remnants, X-ray binary stars and strong stellar winds. Three individual X-ray sources are nearly coincident with individual HII regions. The galaxy has an extended hydrogen disk, with a diameter of 22.3 arcminutes. The total hydrogen I mass of the galaxy is estimated to be 10^{9.95} M_{☉}.

When observed in radiowaves a kpc-scale linear jet like structure is revealed and a bright radio source. Observations by the Australian Square Kilometre Array Pathfinder reveal double radio lobes and jets. The radio jets of this galaxy have half the extent of the inner stellar disk, lie slightly offset from the bar, and coincide with a hole in hydrogen emission. The radio emission excess indicates that the nucleus of the galaxy is active, belonging to the same class as NGC 3079 and Circinus Galaxy. The flux of the nuclear source observed by the Chandra X-ray Observatory is consistent with a low luminosity AGN, like a Seyfert galaxy or LINER.

In the centre of the galaxy is predicted to lie a supermassive black hole whose mass is estimated to be between 0.47 and 4.7 million solar masses, based on the spiral arm pitch angle, or 25 million solar masses based on the M–sigma relation.

== Supernova ==
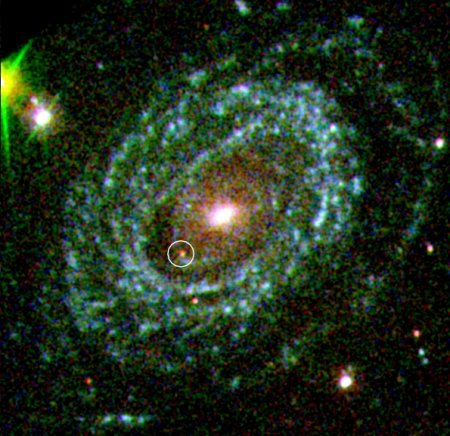
Supernova SN 2005ke imaged by space telescope Swift

One supernova has been observed in NGC 1367, SN 2005ke. The supernova was discovered on 13 November 2005 by M. Baek, R. R. Prasad, and W. Li using the Katzman Automatic Imaging Telescope. The supernova had an apparent magnitude of 17.2 upon discovery. Its spectrum on 16 November indicated it was an underluminous Type Ia supernova before maximum. Observations in X-rays and ultraviolet indicate that the supernova shock wave interacted with the circumstellar medium, consisting of material deposited by the stellar winds of the progenitor system.

== See also ==
- NGC 3898 - a similar galaxy
