= NGC 1353 =

Galaxy in the constellation Eridanus

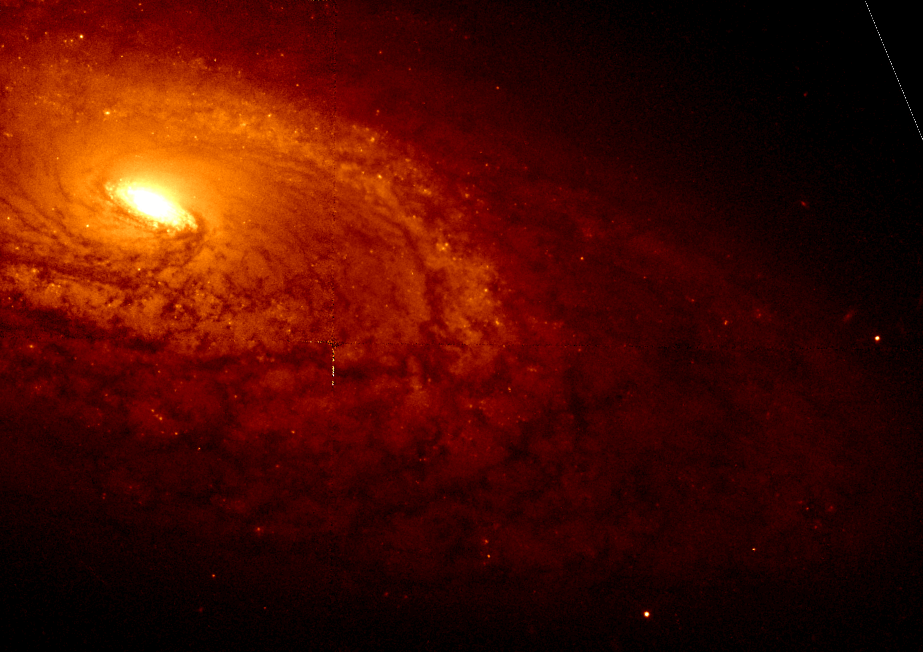
- Hubble Space Telescope image of NGC 1353

Observation data (J2000 epoch)
- Constellation: Eridanus
- Right ascension: 03^{h} 32.31^{m}
- Declination: −20° 49′
- Redshift: 1547 ± 24
- Distance: 21.5 Mpc (70 Mly)
- Apparent magnitude (V): 11.5

Characteristics
- Type: SBb
- Apparent size (V): 3.4′ × 1.4′

Other designations
- UGCA 76, MCG -04-09-022, PGC 13108

NGC 1353 is a flocculent spiral galaxy situated in the constellation of Eridanus. Located about 70 million light years away, it is a member of the Eridanus Cluster of galaxies, a cluster of about 200 galaxies. It was discovered by William Herschel on 9 December 1784.

NGC 1353 has a Hubble classification of SBb, which indicates it is a barred spiral galaxy. It is moving away from the Milky Way at 1547 km/s. Its size on the night sky is 3.4 by 1.4 arcminutes, which corresponds to a real size of 69,000 ly.

== See also ==
- NGC 2841, a famous flocculent spiral galaxy
