= NGC 1347 =

Galaxy in the constellation Eridanus

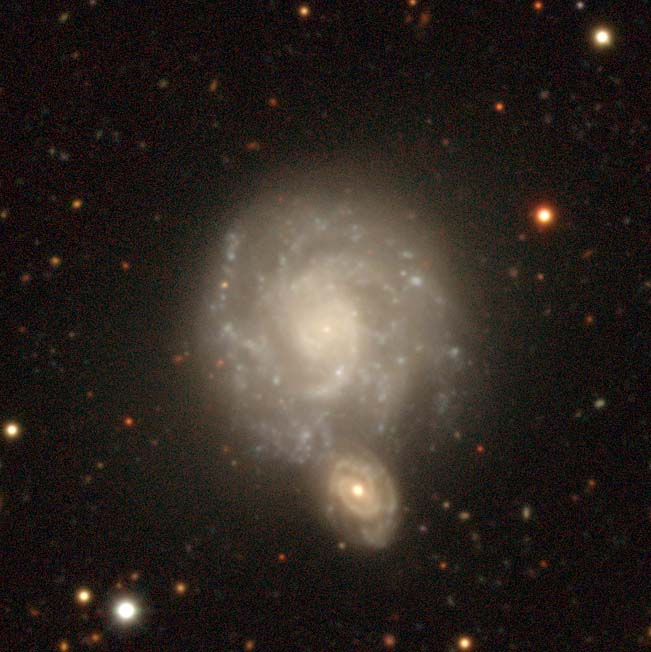
- NGC 1347 (legacy surveys)

Observation data (J2000 epoch)
- Constellation: Eridanus
- Right ascension: 03^{h} 29.418^{m}
- Declination: −22° 16′
- Redshift: 1760
- Distance: 24.8 Mpc (80.9 Mly)
- Apparent magnitude (V): 13.2

Characteristics
- Type: SBc
- Apparent size (V): 1.5′ × 1.3′

Other designations
- AM 0327-222, PGC 12989, Arp 39, IRAS 03275-2226, VV 23, ESO 548-27, MCG -4-9-17

NGC 1347 is a barred spiral galaxy situated in the constellation of Eridanus. It is at a distance of 81 million light years and is a member of the Eridanus Cluster, a cluster of about 200 galaxies.

NGC 1347 has a Hubble classification of SBc, which indicates it is a barred spiral galaxy. It is moving away from the Milky Way at a rate of 1,760 km/s. Its size on the night sky is 1.5' x 1.3' which is proportional to its real size of 35 000 ly.

NGC 1347 forms a pair, named Arp 39, with the galaxy PGC 816443.
