= NGC 1332 =

Galaxy in the constellation Eridanus

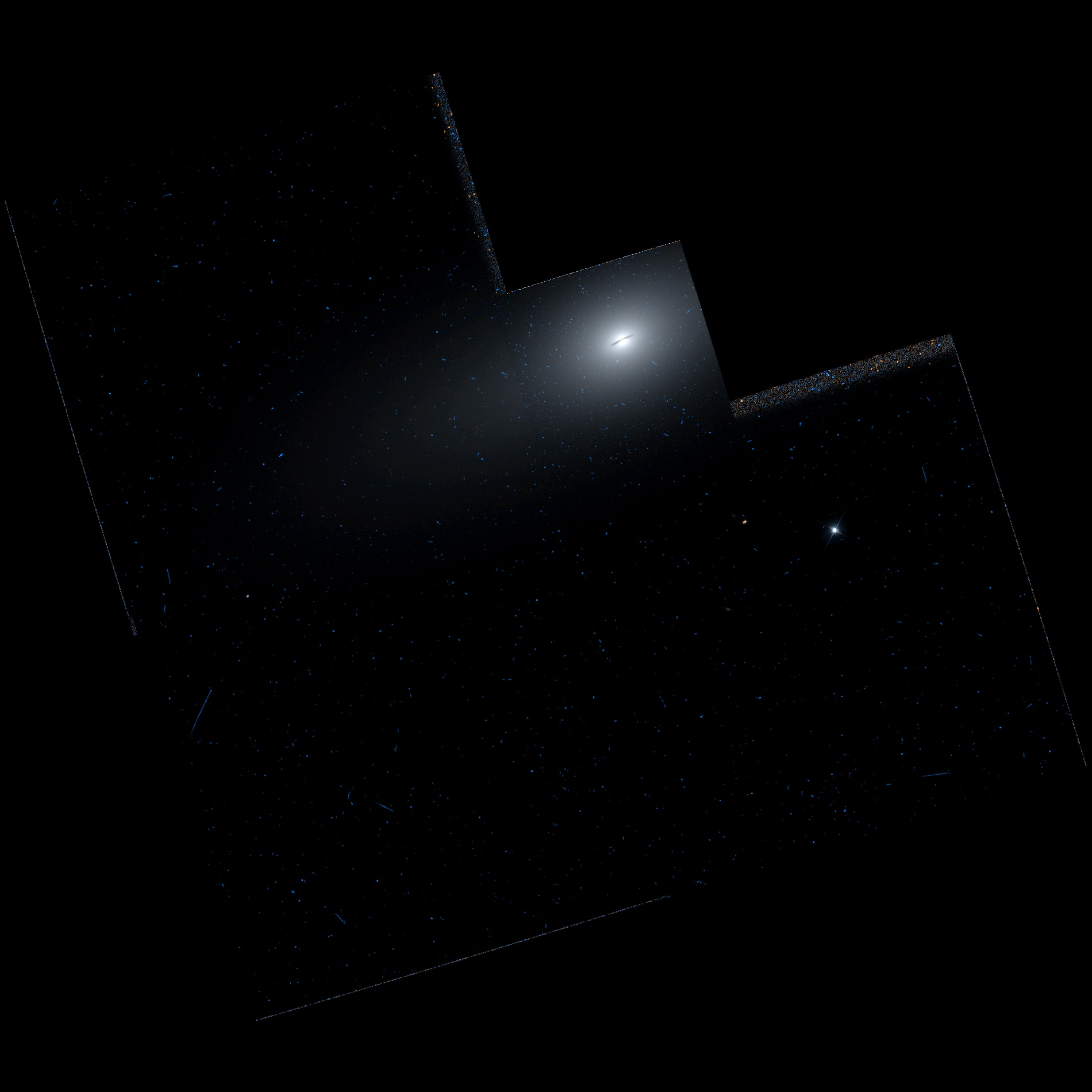
- NGC 1332 imaged by the Hubble Space Telescope

Observation data (J2000 epoch)
- Constellation: Eridanus
- Right ascension: 03^{h} 26^{m} 17.2267^{s}
- Declination: −21° 20′ 06.599″
- Redshift: 0.005400
- Heliocentric radial velocity: 1553 ± 19 km/s
- Distance: 21.5 Mpc (70.1 Mly)
- Apparent magnitude (V): 10.3

Characteristics
- Type: E
- Size: ~131,400 ly (40.29 kpc) (estimated)
- Apparent size (V): 4.5′ × 1.4′

Other designations
- ESO 548- G 018, IRAS 03240-2130, UGCA 72, MCG -04-09-011, PGC 12838

NGC 1332 is an almost edge-on elliptical galaxy located in constellation of Eridanus. Situated about 70 million light years away, it is a member of the Eridanus Cluster of galaxies, a cluster of about 200 galaxies. It is also the brightest member of the NGC 1332 Group. It was discovered by William Herschel on 9 December 1784.

NGC 1332 has a Hubble classification of E, which indicates it is an elliptical galaxy. It is moving away from the Milky Way at a rate of 1,553 km/s. Its size on the night sky is 4.5' x 1.4' which is proportional to its real size of 92 000 ly.

NGC 1332 is an early-type galaxy. Despite their name, early-type galaxies are much older than spiral galaxies, and mostly comprise old, red-colored stars. Very little star formation occurs in these galaxies; the lack of star formation in elliptical galaxies appears to start at the center and then slowly propagates outward.

== Supernova ==
One supernova has been observed in NGC 1332: SN 1982E (type unknown, mag. 14) was discovered by Marina Wischnjewsky on 29 March 1982.

== Black hole ==
NGC 1332 is known by its possessing a supermassive black hole at the center. In 2016, a team from United States and China used the Atacama Large Millimeter/submillimeter Array (ALMA) to collect high resolution data. They were able to measure the mass of the black hole. They determined the mass of about 660 million solar-masses with an uncertainty of just 10%. NGC 1332's black hole is the most massive black hole in the Eridanus Cluster, and it is even more massive than NGC 1399's black hole (NGC 1399 is the Fornax Cluster's central galaxy).

== Gallery ==
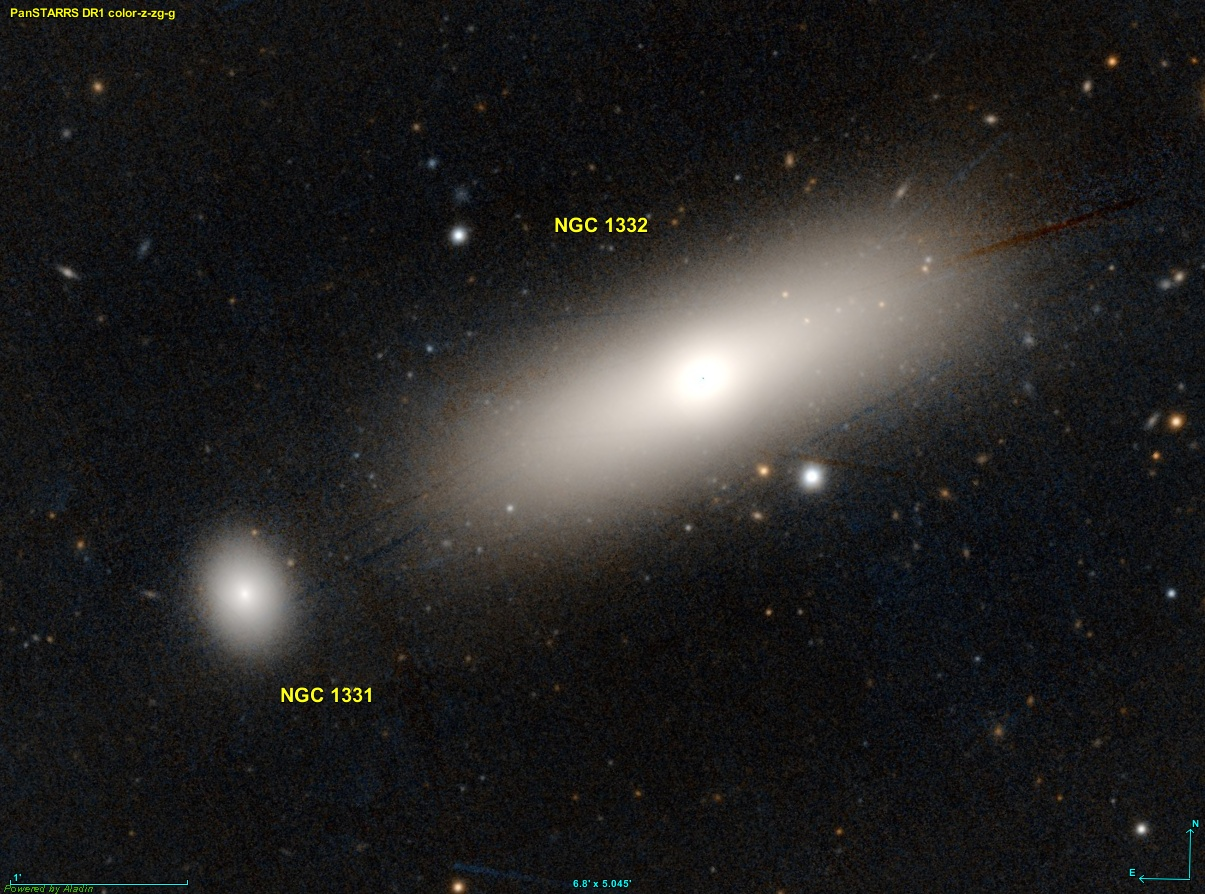
Pan-STARRS image of NGC 1332

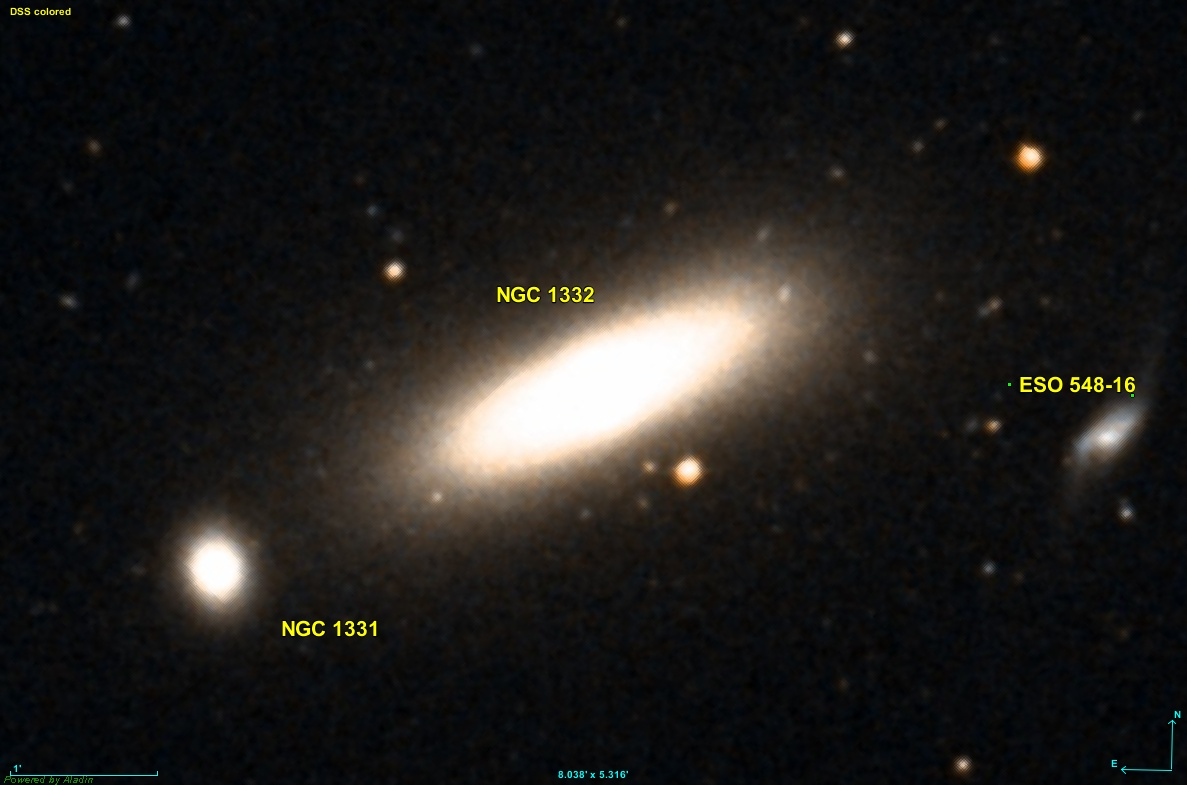
DSS image of NGC 1332

== See also ==
- List of NGC objects (1001–2000)
