= NGC 1325 =

Galaxy in the constellation Eridanus

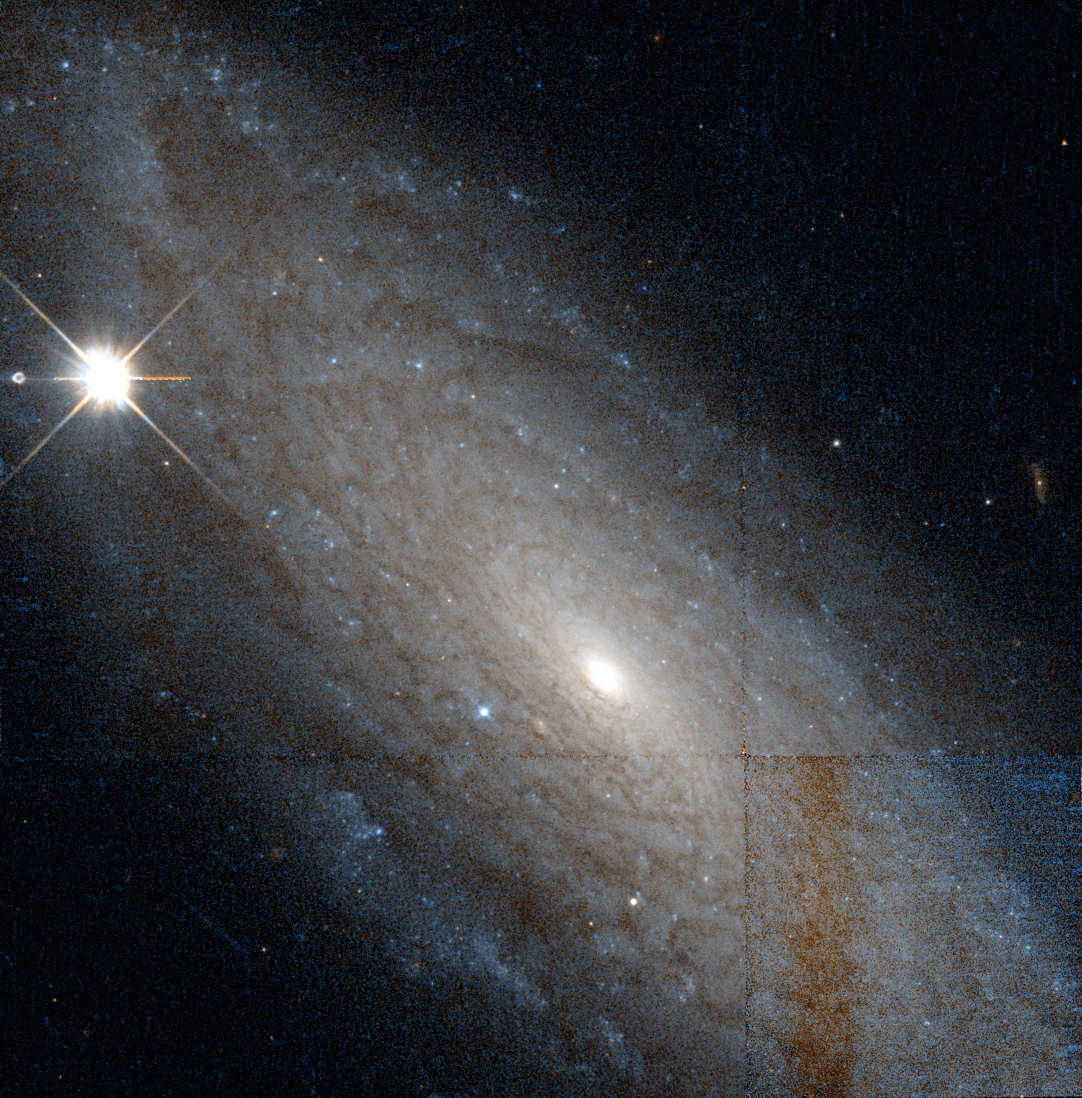
- Hubble Space Telescope image of NGC 1325

Observation data (J2000 epoch)
- Constellation: Eridanus
- Right ascension: 03^{h} 25.576^{m}
- Declination: −21° 32′ 38.61″
- Heliocentric radial velocity: 1,588
- Distance: 75.0 Mly (23.01 Mpc)h^{−1}_{0.73}
- Group or cluster: Eridanus Cluster
- Apparent magnitude (V): 11.5

Characteristics
- Type: SBbc
- Apparent size (V): 4.47′ × 1.66′
- Notable features: Flocculent spiral galaxy

Other designations
- IRAS 03221-2143, NGC 1325, UGCA 70, PGC 12737, ESO 548-7, MCG -4-9-4

NGC 1325 is a flocculent spiral galaxy situated in the constellation of Eridanus. Located about 75 million light years away, it is a member of the Eridanus Cluster of galaxies, a cluster of about 200 galaxies. It was discovered by William Herschel on 19 December 1799.

NGC 1325 has a Hubble classification of SBbc, which indicates it is a barred spiral galaxy with moderately wound arms. Its angular size on the night sky is 4.5' x 1.7'. The disk of the galaxy is inclined at an angle of 71° with the main axis aligned along a position angle of 232°. The rotation curve for the galaxy is flat across much of the radius from the core. The galaxy is moving away from the Milky Way with a heliocentric radial velocity of 1,588 km/s.

== Supernovae ==
Two supernovae have been observed in NGC 1325:

- SN 1975S was discovered by Justus Dunlap and Yvonne Dunlap at Corralitos Observatory on 30 December 1975 . Designated with a magnitude of 14.6, it was positioned 53″ east and 77″ north of the galactic nucleus. The color of this supernova and the rapid decline of the lightcurve suggest it was a Type II supernova.
- SN 2021yja (Type II-P or Type Ic, mag. 15.334) was discovered by ATLAS on September 8, 2021. A core-collapse supernova, it was initially categorized as a Type II, but may instead be a Type Ic.
