= NGC 1426 =

Elliptical galaxy in the constellation Eridanus

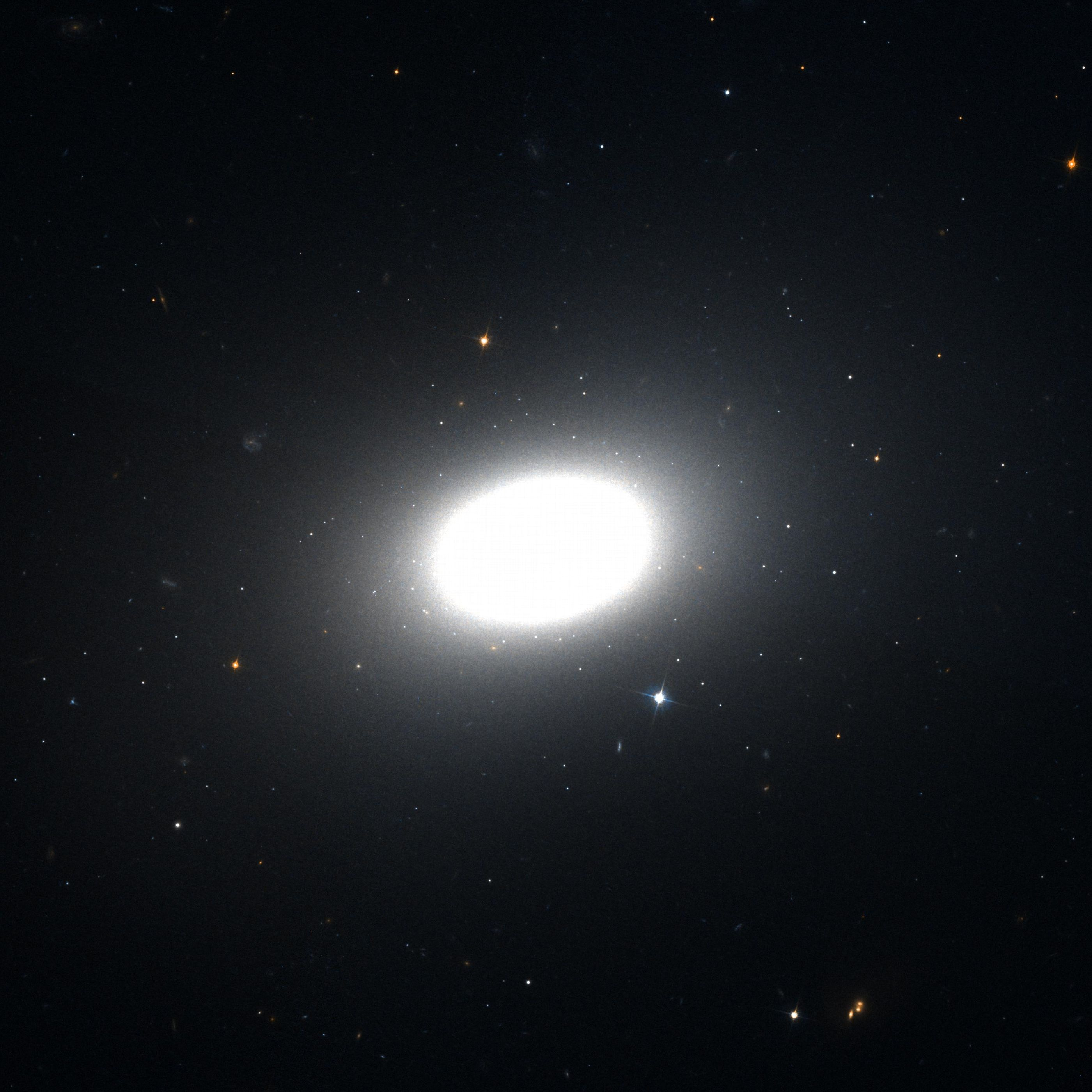
- NGC 1426 (NASA/ESA HST)

Observation data (J2000.0 epoch)
- Constellation: Eridanus
- Right ascension: 03^{h} 42^{m} 49.11^{s}
- Declination: −22° 06′ 30.10″
- Redshift: 0.004813
- Heliocentric radial velocity: 1443 ± 6 km/s
- Distance: 59 Mly
- Apparent magnitude (V): 11.30
- Apparent magnitude (B): 12.30

Characteristics
- Type: E4
- Apparent size (V): 2.6 x 1.7

Other designations
- PGC 13638, MCG -3-7-29, ESO 549-1

NGC 1426 is an elliptical galaxy approximately 59 million light-years away from Earth in the constellation of Eridanus. It was discovered by William Herschel in December 9, 1784.

NGC 1426 is a member of the Eridanus Cluster.

== See also ==
- Elliptical galaxy
- List of NGC objects (1001–2000)
- Eridanus (constellation)
