= NGC 1439 =

Elliptical galaxy in the constellation Eridanus

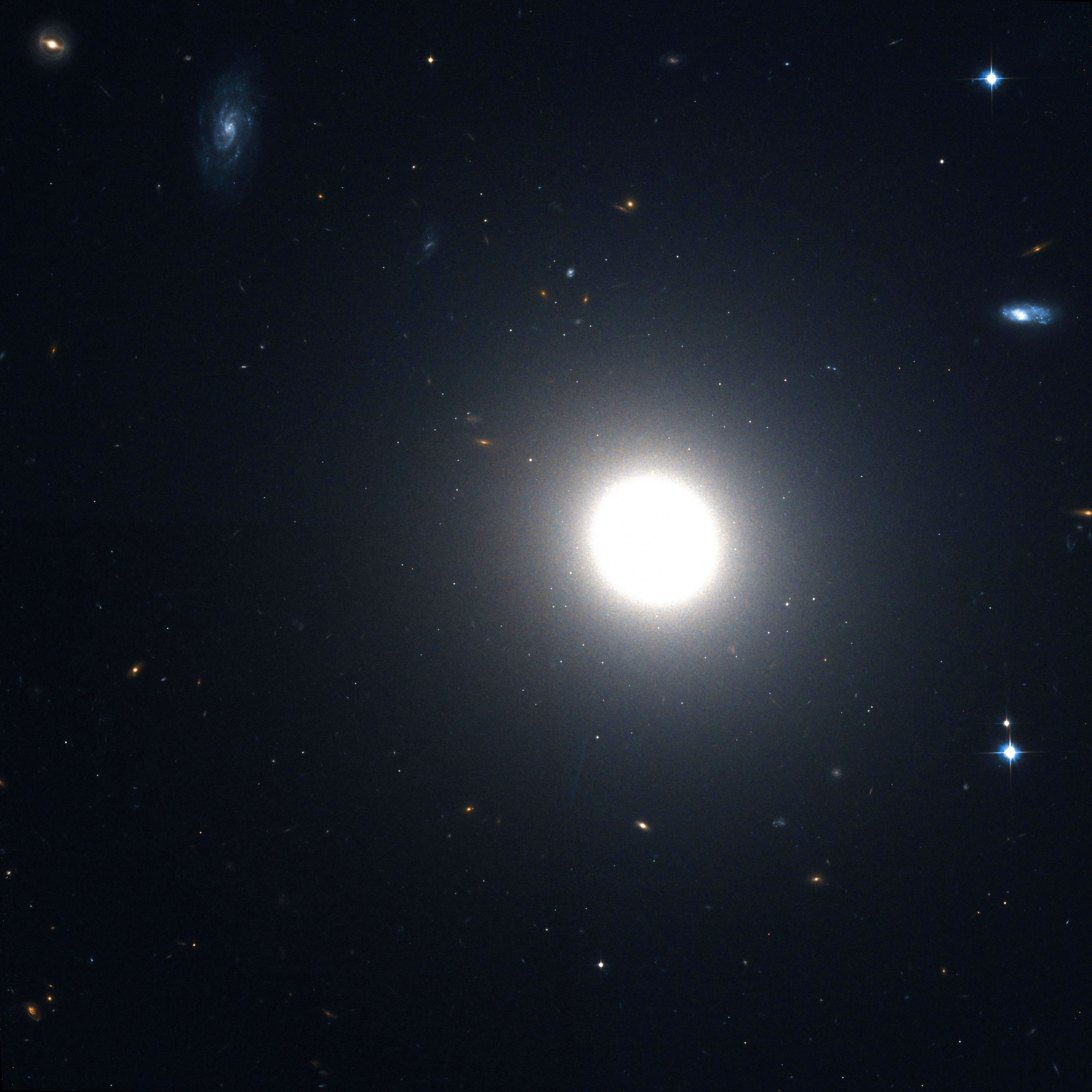
- Hubble Space Telescope image of NGC 1439

Observation data (J2000 epoch)
- Constellation: Eridanus
- Right ascension: 03^{h} 44.498^{m}
- Declination: −21° 55′
- Heliocentric radial velocity: 1668 ± 8 km/s
- Distance: 23.5 Mpc (76.6 Mly)
- Apparent magnitude (V): 11.4

Characteristics
- Type: E1
- Apparent size (V): 2.4′ × 2.2′

Other designations
- MCG -04-09-056, PGC 13738

NGC 1439 is an elliptical galaxy located in constellation of Eridanus. Situated about 77 million light years away, it is a member of the Eridanus Cluster of galaxies, a cluster of about 200 galaxies. It was discovered by William Herschel on 9 December 1784.

NGC 1439 has a Hubble classification of E1, which indicates it is an elliptical galaxy with no extensions. It is moving away from the Milky Way at a rate of 1,668 km/s. Its size on the night sky is 2.4' x 2.2' which is proportional to its real size of 54 000 ly.

NGC 1439 is an early-type galaxy. Despite their name, early-type galaxies are much older than spiral galaxies, and mostly comprise old, red-colored stars. Very little star formation occurs in these galaxies; the lack of star formation in elliptical galaxies appears to start at the center and then slowly propagates outward.

Most of the galaxies like NGC 1439 are dust poor. However, NGC 1439 contains more dust than usual.

== Gallery ==
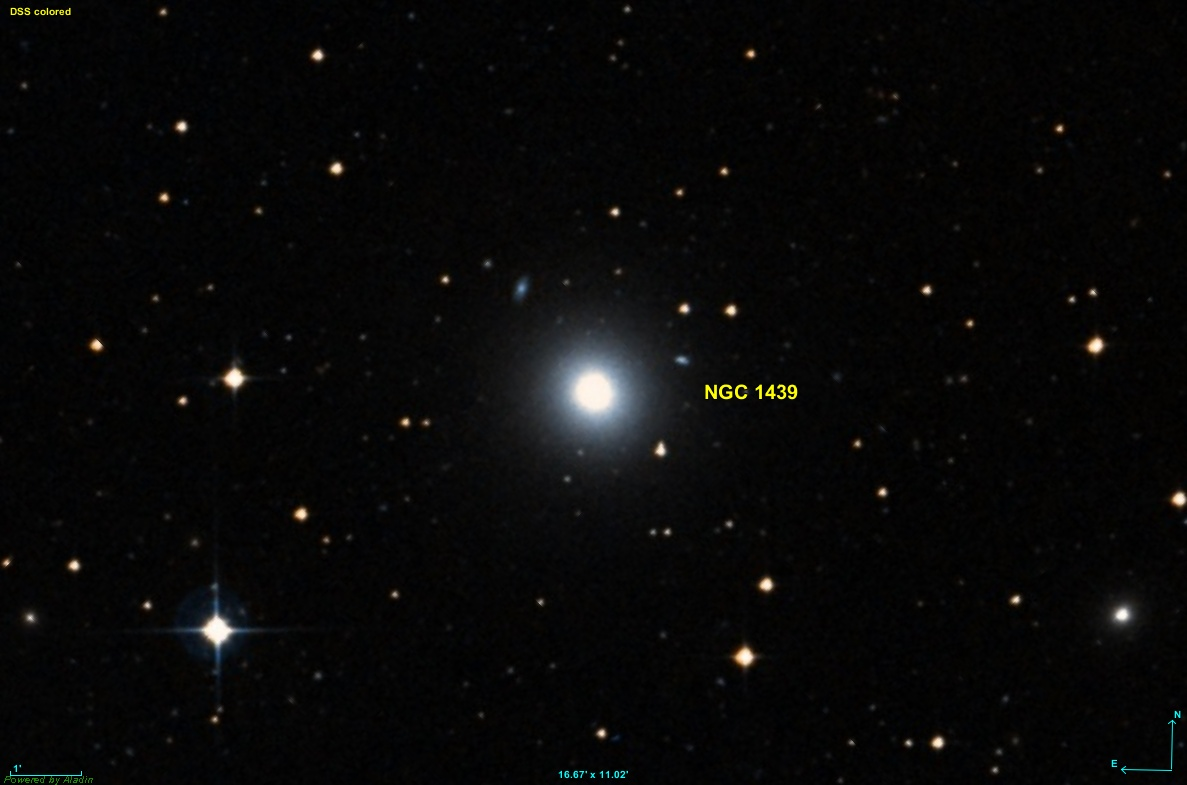
DSS image of NGC 1439

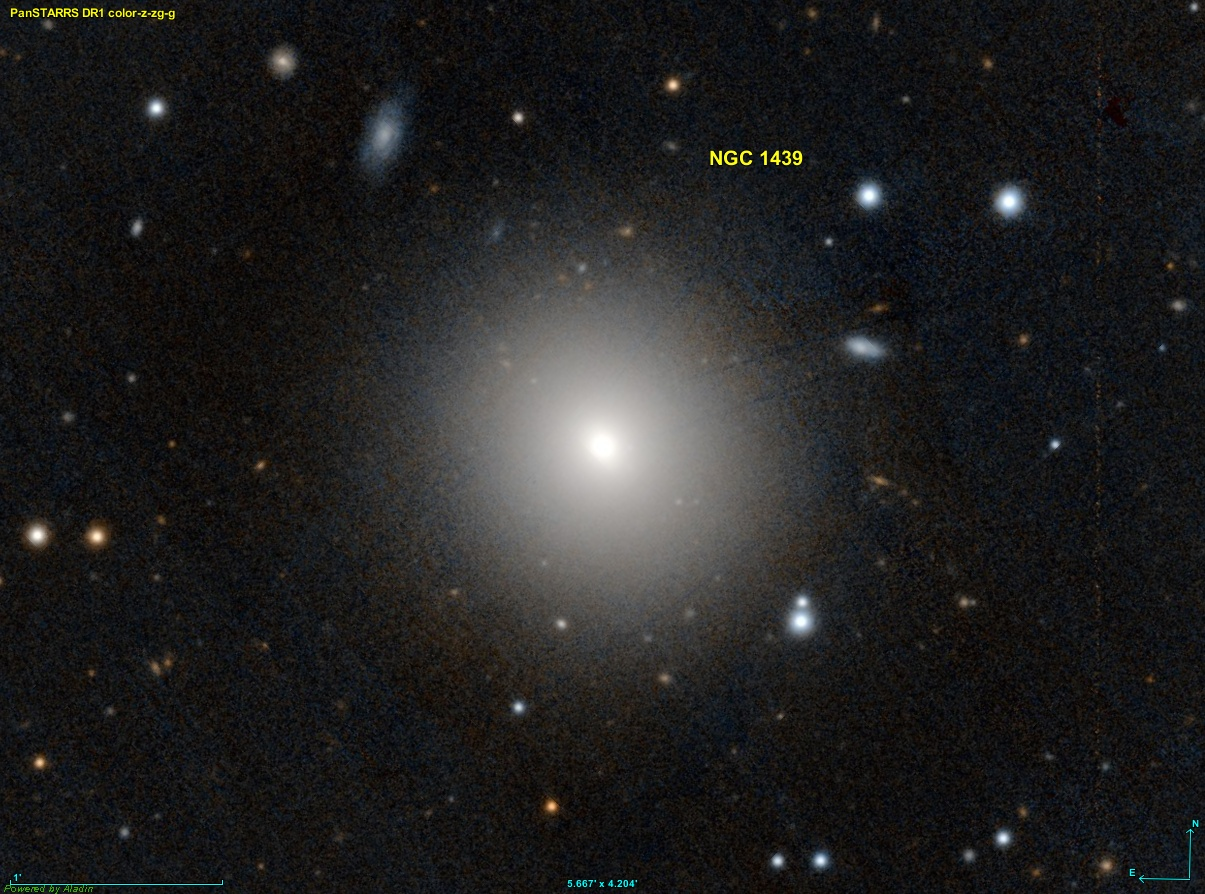
NGC 1439 by Pan-STARRS

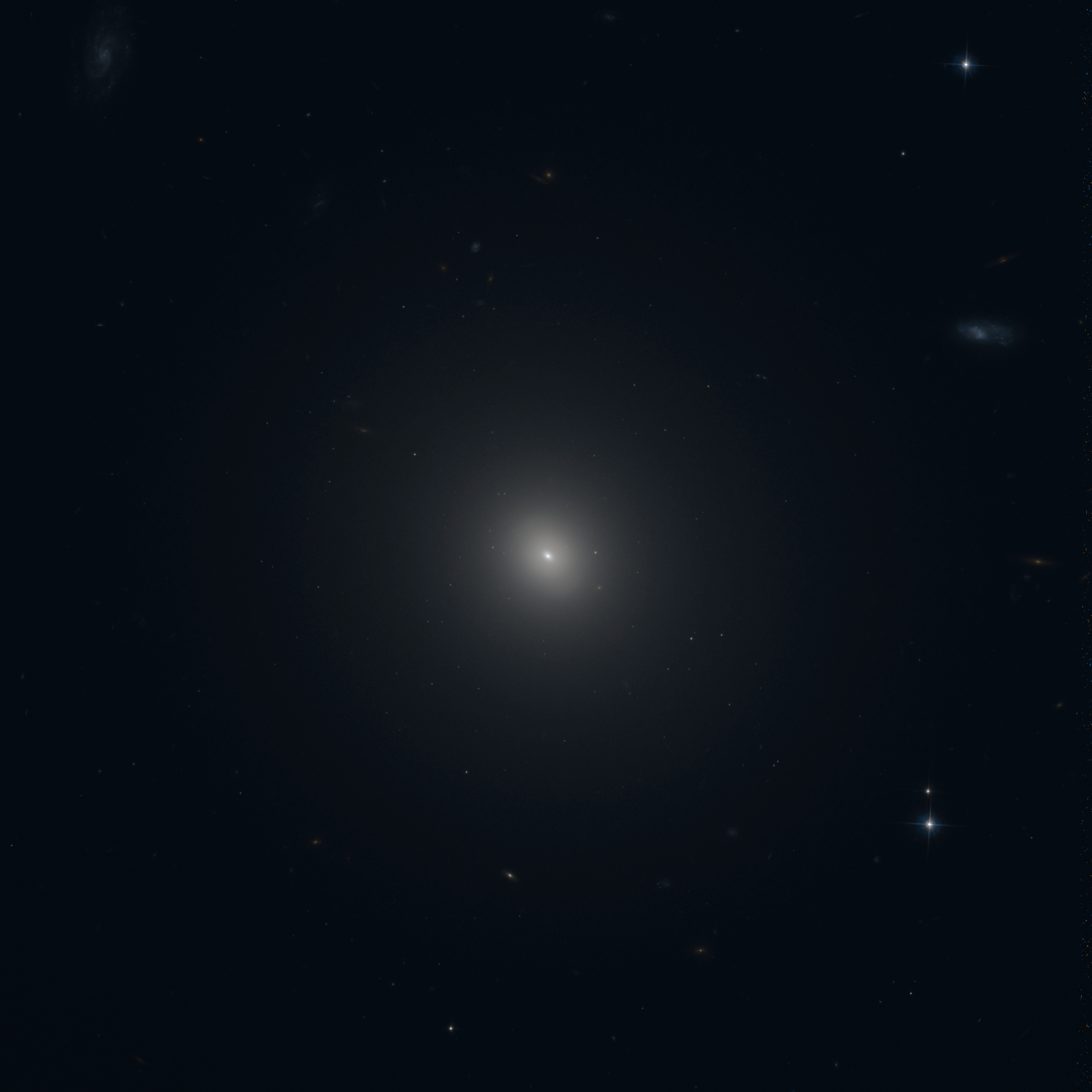
NGC 1439 (HST)
