= Mary Brück =

Irish astronomer

Dr. Mary Teresa Brück
- Máire Treasa Ní Chonmhidhe
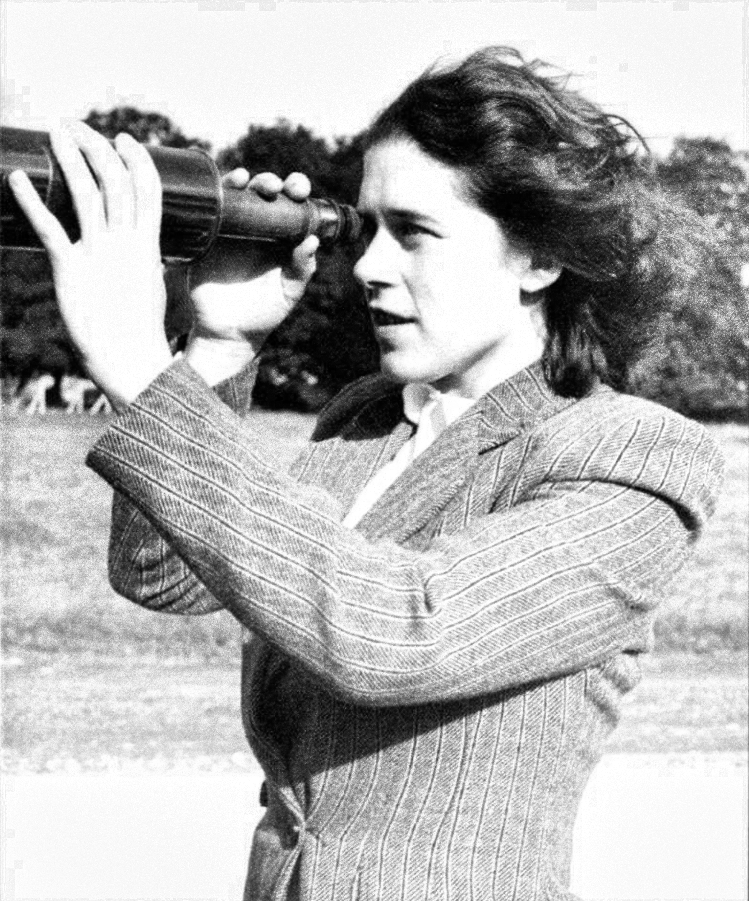
- Mary Brück at Dunsink Observatory in 1954 attempting to observe a total solar eclipse in Öland, Sweden
- Born: 29 May 1925; Ballivor, County Meath, Ireland
- Died: 11 December 2008 (aged 83); Penicuik, Scotland
- Other name: Mary Teresa Conway
- Education: University College Dublin; University of Edinburgh
- Spouse(s): Hermann Brück (m. 1951); 3 children, 2 stepchildren
- Scientific career
- Fields: Astronomy; History of science
- Workplaces: Dunsink Observatory; University of Edinburgh
- Thesis: Studies of Hα Line Profiles in Prominences (1950)
- Doctoral advisor: Mervyn A. Ellison

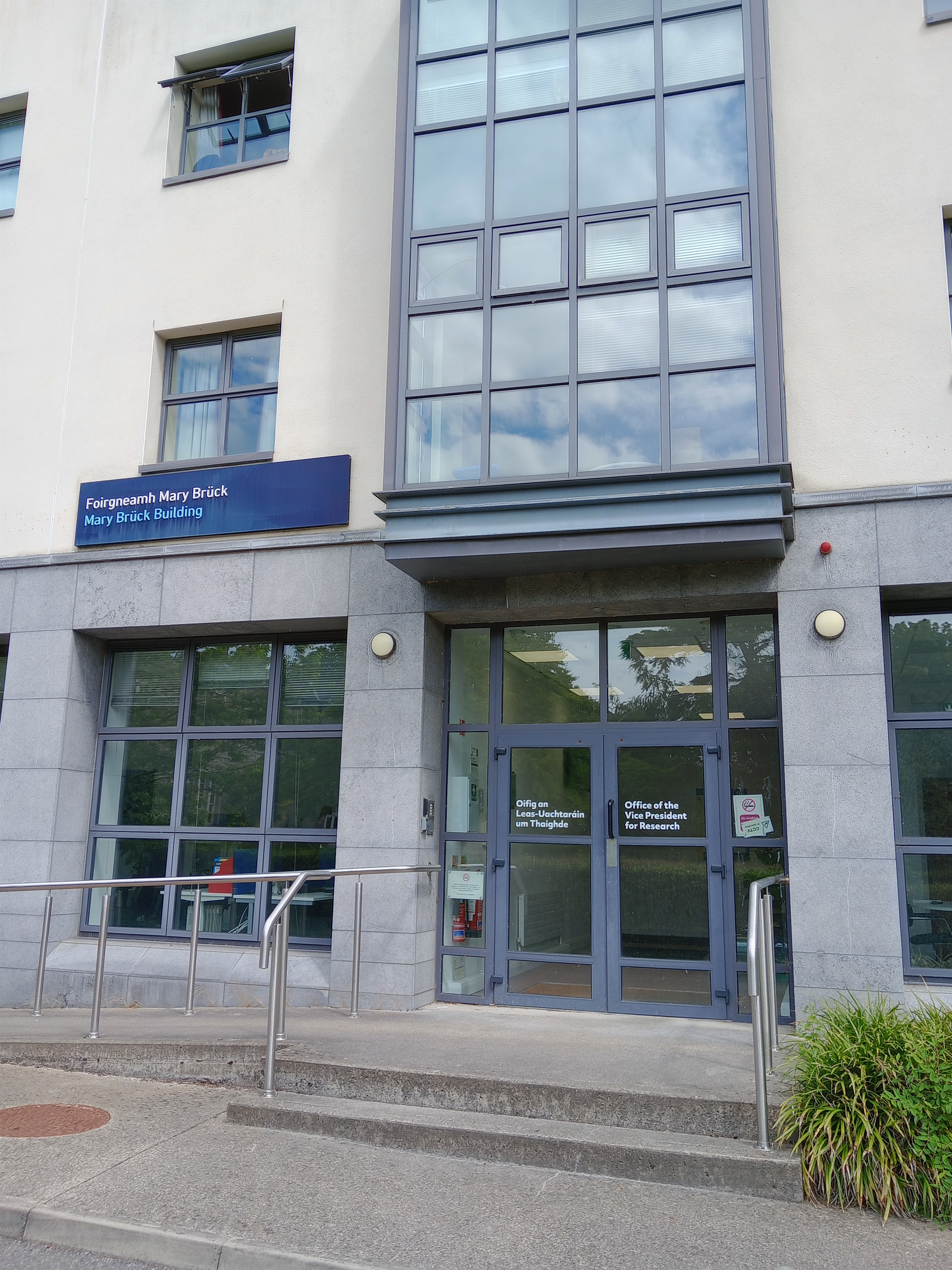
The Mary Brück building at Dublin City University

Mary Teresa Brück (née Conway; 29 May 1925 – 11 December 2008) was an Irish astronomer, astrophysicist and historian of science, whose career was spent at Dunsink Observatory in Dublin and the Royal Observatory, Edinburgh in Scotland.

== Early life ==
Mary Teresa Conway was born on 29 May 1925 in Ballivor, County Meath, Ireland, the eldest of eight children. She used the Irish form of her name, Máire Treasa Ní Chonmhidhe, while attending convent school, where she showed talents for mathematics, science and music, and at University College Dublin where she studied physics. She earned BSc and MSc degrees, in 1945 and 1946, respectively.

== Astronomer ==
Mary Conway was a postgraduate at the University of Edinburgh (Scotland), where she carried out research in solar astrophysics, culminating in the award of a PhD in 1950. Her doctoral supervisor was fellow Irish-born scientist Mervyn Archdall Ellison, then a principal scientific officer at the Royal Observatory, Edinburgh.

Conway returned to Dublin to work at the Dunsink Observatory. The observatory had reopened as a research institute in 1947 when it was transferred to the Dublin Institute for Advanced Studies, and the German-born astronomer Hermann Brück (1905–2000) had been appointed as the new Director.

Conway and Hermann Brück, a widower with two children, married in 1951, after which she took the name Mary Brück. She had three additional children with him.

Hermann Brück was appointed Astronomer Royal for Scotland in 1957 and the family moved to Edinburgh. Brück was appointed a part-time lecturer at the University of Edinburgh in 1962. She subsequently became a full-time lecturer and was promoted to senior lecturer.

Mary Brück carried out research into stars, the interstellar medium and the Magellanic Clouds. Some of this made use of photographic observations from the United Kingdom Schmidt Telescope at Siding Spring in Australia.

She used the numbers, brightnesses and colours of stars in the Magellanic Clouds to study the structure and evolution of these nearby galaxies. She published widely in the Monthly Notices of the Royal Astronomical Society, Publications of the Royal Observatory Edinburgh, Nature and Astronomy and Astrophysics.

In 2001, she was awarded the Lorimer Medal of the Astronomical Society of Edinburgh in recognition of meritorious work in diffusing the knowledge of Astronomy among the general public.

In July 2017, Dublin City University named a building after Dr. Mary Brück in recognition of her contributions to science.

The Mary Brück Building at the University of Edinburgh was also named in her honour.

== Historian of science ==
Mary Brück collaborated with her husband on a biography of the 19th-century Astronomer Royal for Scotland, Charles Piazzi Smyth. She developed a reputation as an historian of science, specialising in the work of women in astronomy, and the history of astronomy in Scotland and Ireland. She published articles in several different journals, including the Irish Astronomical Journal, the Quarterly Journal of the Royal Astronomical Society, the Journal of Astronomical History and Heritage and the Antiquarian Astronomer. She sat on the editorial board of the Antiquarian Astronomer.

Mary Brück wrote a book on Agnes Mary Clerke, the prominent 19th-century Irish woman astronomer, author and commentator on science, Agnes Mary Clerke and the Rise of Astrophysics. This was followed by Women in Early British and Irish Astronomy: Stars and Satellites, which described the work of women astronomers, many of whom had been overlooked previously. Mary Brück contributed five articles to the Oxford Dictionary of National Biography, and six to the Biographical Encyclopedia of Astronomers.

She is also the author of the classic 1965 Ladybird book, The Night Sky.
