= Gillian Wright (astronomer) =

Scottish astronomer

Gillian Wright CBE FRSE
- Born: Gillian Susan Wright
- Education: University of Glasgow; Imperial College London
- Scientific career
- Fields: Infrared observatories, astronomical instrumentation, star formation and dust in interacting galaxies
- Workplaces: United Kingdom Infrared Telescope; Royal Observatory Edinburgh; UK Astronomy Technology Centre
- Thesis: Infrared activity in interacting galaxies (1987)
- Doctoral advisor: Robert Joseph

Gillian Susan Wright CBE FRSE is a Scottish astronomer who was, until September 2024, the director of the UK Astronomy Technology Centre in Edinburgh, UK. She has also been involved in the development and construction of the James Webb Space Telescope as the European Principal Investigator for the Mid-Infrared Instrument (MIRI). In 2006 Wright was appointed MBE for services to science.

== Education ==
Wright attended a comprehensive school in the town of Hamilton, where she studied for Scottish Highers in Chemistry, English, French, Maths and Physics, then went on to study Natural Philosophy (Physics) at the University of Glasgow. She then pursued postgraduate studies at Imperial College London, firstly obtaining an master's degree in 1982. Wrights master's thesis, titled Design study for a large balloon-borne far infrared telescope investigates the practicalities of a balloon mounted infra-red telescope, including techniques for making lightweight mirrors, optical configurations and potential structural problems. Wright then submitted her PhD at the same institute, titled Infrared activity in interacting galaxies, in 1986. This work investigated the cause of unusually intense Infra-red activity in the nuclei of interacting galaxies, concluding that the most likely cause was recent bursts of star formation.

== Career ==
After her PhD, Wright was appointed a fellowship position at the Royal Observatory, Edinburgh. She was then staff scientist at the UK Infrared Telescope in Hawaii, and later became the Head of Instrumentation there from 1995 to 1997. In 1997 Wright returned to Edinburgh to join the newly formed UK Astronomy Technology Centre, where she held the position of director until September 2024. She is also a visiting professor at the University of Edinburgh's Institute for Astronomy and a member of the Scottish Universities Physics Alliance (SUPA) International Advisory Committee.

=== Space telescopes ===
Over her career Wright has been involved in a number of space telescope projects. She was a co-investigator for the Spectral and Photometric Imaging Receiver instrument (SPIRE) on European Space Agency's Herschel Space Observatory, which was active from 2009 to 2013. She is currently the European Principal for the Mid-Infrared Instrument (MIRI) on NASA's James Webb Space Telescope, as well as being a member of the project's science working group. MIRI was completed in 2012, when it was shipped to NASA's Goddard Space Flight Centre for incorporation into the telescope, which was launched on 25 December 2021.

== Honours ==
Wright was appointed Member of the Order of the British Empire (MBE) in 2006 for services to science and Commander of the Order of the British Empire (CBE) in the 2023 New Year Honours for services to astronomy through international missions.

She is also a Fellow of the Royal Society of Edinburgh.
