= William N. Stokoe =

British organic chemist

Dr William Norman Stokoe FRSE FRIC LLD (abt. 1892–1958) was a 20th century British organic chemist. He is primarily remembered as the scientist behind Britain's push on the consumption of margarine during the Second World War as a cheap way of introducing dietary supplements to the British population.

== Life ==
Norman Leslie was the second child of John William Stokoe and Sarah Mary (née Wright) His career in Edinburgh began in 1918 as Chief Chemist at the Craigmillar Creamery Co.

In 1926 he was elected a Fellow of the Royal Society of Edinburgh. His proposers were Alexander Lauder, George Barger, Sir James Walker and Ralph Allan Sampson.

In the Second World War he served as Technical Advisor to the British government on Margarine Production. This was in the wake of general butter shortages in Britain. Margarine was used to fill the place of butter as a cheaper and more readily available product. A wider health issue was also addressed through the artificial addition of vitamins to margarine from that time.

In 1948 he moved from Edinburgh to Bromborough Port on the River Mersey, where he became Chief Chemist to Van Den Bergh & Jurgens Ltd, then Britain's largest manufacturer of margarine, and later to merge to become part of Unilever. During this period he did much to improve the palatability of margarine.

He retired in 1957 died in Edinburgh on 12 December 1958.

== Family ==
He and Annie Barbour (née Henderson) were the parents of three sons and one daughter, one of whom was Norman Leslie Stokoe (1923-2017).

== Publications ==
- Rancidity of Butter and Margarine Fats (1921)
- Rancidity of Coconut Oil (1928)
