= Ruric Wrigley =

British astronomer (1883-1979)

Ruric Whitehead Wrigley FRSE PASE (1883–1979) was a British astronomer. He served as president of the Astronomical Society of Edinburgh in 1948.

== Life ==
He was born in Rossendale in Lancashire on 24 February 1883, the son of William Wrigley and his wife Martha Bradbury Sugden. He was educated privately at the Leys School in Cambridge. He then studied Sciences at Cambridge University specialising in Astronomy graduating MA in 1905.

In 1909 he joined the Royal Observatory Edinburgh on Blackford Hill in Edinburgh as an assistant. He served there as Senior Assistant Astronomer until 1943.

In 1910 he was elected a Fellow of the Royal Society of Edinburgh. His proposers were Sir Frank Watson Dyson, Thomas Heath, Cargill Gilston Knott, and James Gordon MacGregor.

In the First World War he served as a Lieutenant in the Royal Navy Volunteer Reserve.

He died on 29 October 1979.
