= Astronomical Society of Edinburgh =

Scottish scientific society

- Established: 1924
- Location: Edinburgh, Scotland
- Website: http://www.astronomyedinburgh.org/

The Astronomical Society of Edinburgh (ASE) is an association of amateur astronomers and other individuals interested in astronomy, which is based in Edinburgh, Scotland. The objectives are to encourage astronomical study and observation and to increase popular interest in astronomy.

== History ==
The ASE was founded in 1924 as the Edinburgh Astronomical Association; it changed its name in 1937. The founding president was John McDougal Field, who was also deputy to the City Astronomer William Peck at the City Observatory on Calton Hill. At that time, the honorary presidents were Peck and the Astronomer Royal for Scotland, Ralph Allan Sampson. Field continued to run the City Observatory after Peck's death in 1925.

The painter John Henry Lorimer was a member and vice president from 1930 to 1933. Upon his death in 1936, the ASE inherited the bulk of his estate. The ASE created the Lorimer Medal, connected to a series of high-profile public lectures.

Field died in 1937, which led to an arrangement with the Edinburgh Corporation for the ASE to have a free lease of the Calton Hill Observatory and for a grant to the ASE to operate the observatory. This arrangement continued until 2009. In 1953, the ASE moved its own base and venue for its lectures and meetings from the Royal Scottish Geographical Society at Randolph Crescent to the Calton Hill Observatory.

Since leaving the City Observatory in 2009, the ASE has transferred the venue for its monthly lectures and meetings to the Augustine United Church hall on George IV Bridge in the centre of the Old Town in Edinburgh.

In person meetings are normally held on the first Friday of each month (except August), and are open to the public free of charge. During the Covid pandemic, the Society took many of its meetings online and dramatically increased its output from one meeting per month to two meetings per week, to keep people engaged and distracted from everything going on around them. Once the pandemic ended 2 meetings per month became the norm: one hybrid meeting in person and one online via Zoom for members and live streamed for visitors on the ASE's YouTube channel.

== ASERO: Astronomical Society of Edinburgh Remote Observatory ==
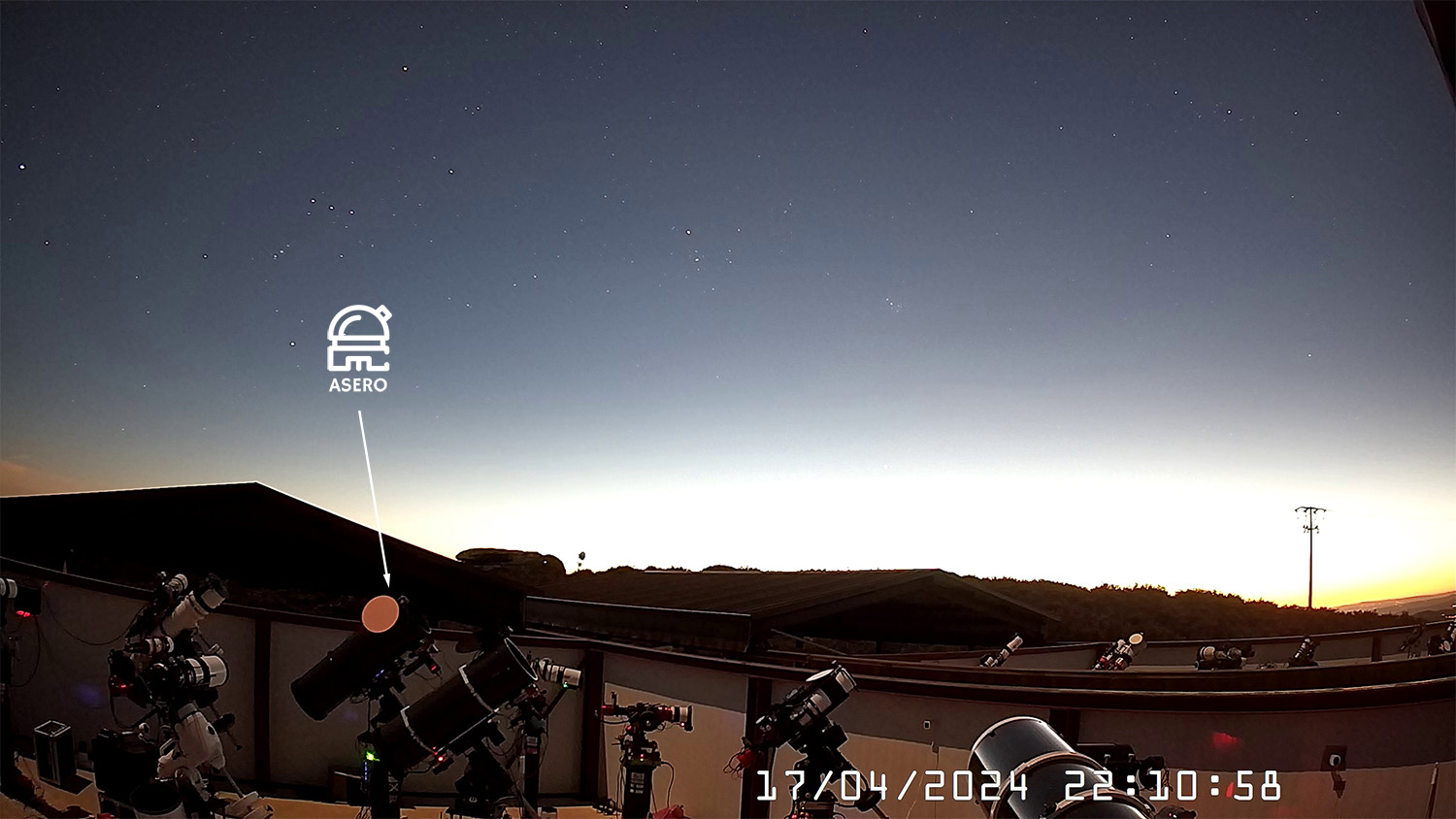
ASERO Trevinca Spain

As part of the Centenary celebrations, the ASE setup a remote observatory at Trevinca Skies in Galicia, Spain in 2023, completed in April 2024. ASERO consists of two telescopes on a JTW Trident P75 mount with a colour CMOS camera on a wide-field refractor and a mono CMOS camera plus 9 filters on a 0.3m Newtonian. The facility is used by members to take part in various projects such as imaging galaxies, clusters and nebulae, comet and variable star monitoring, exoplanet transits, Lunar imaging and more. A dedicated Flickr group exists for all images taken using ASERO.

== Affiliations ==
The society is a member of the Federation of Astronomical Societies and is a registered Scottish charity (Charity Number SC022968).

== Honorary Presidents ==
There are usually two Honorary Presidents, one of them the Astronomer Royal for Scotland. The current holders of the positions are:

- Prof. Catherine Heymans, the Astronomer Royal for Scotland, and Professor of Astrophysics at the University of Edinburgh
- Prof. Andrew Lawrence, Regius Professor of Astronomy at the University of Edinburgh

== See also ==
- List of astronomical societies
