= Edinburgh Astronomical Institution =

Coordinates: 55°57′17″N 3°11′0″W

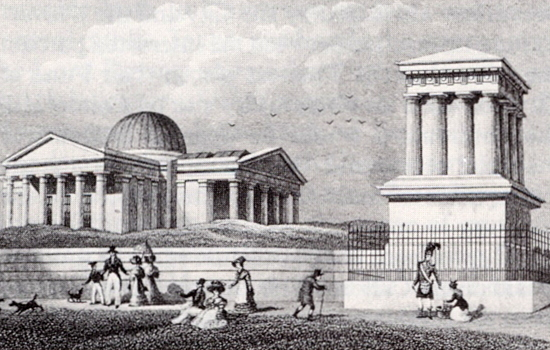
Playfair Building and Playfair Monument in 1824

The Edinburgh Astronomical Institution was founded in 1811 and wound up in 1847. It was instrumental in the foundation of the Royal Observatory, Edinburgh in 1822. The Institution raised funds, mostly by member subscription, to create three departments: A scientific observatory with an observer was to be under the control of the professors of mathematics, philosophy and astronomy of the University of Edinburgh, a popular observatory was to provide general instruction and amusement and a "physical cabinet" would comprise books, globes, meteorological and other instruments.

== History ==
The first president of the Institution was John Playfair, professor of natural philosophy. The members were predominantly landed gentry, advocates, bankers, academics, clergy, etc. The City of Edinburgh provided the abandoned observatory on Calton Hill, and the popular observatory was then set up in the existing Gothic Tower. Another observatory building was demolished and in 1818 work started on its replacement, which is now known as the Playfair Building.

The Institution's funds were exhausted before instruments could be purchased for the new scientific observatory. This would be a recurring problem until the Institution's eventual demise in 1847. In 1822 it presented a loyal address to George IV and the new observatory was granted the title of Royal Observatory. With Government grants and after much delay in procuring instruments it was only in 1834 that Thomas Henderson was appointed the first observer. This was now the Government-funded position of Astronomer Royal for Scotland. The incumbent would also be Regius Professor of Astronomy at the University of Edinburgh.

Henderson died in 1844 and in 1846 Charles Piazzi Smyth was appointed as his successor. Due to the deteriorating finances of the Institution it was forced to hand over its property to the Government in 1847. The Royal Observatory continued on Calton Hill. After Piazzi Smyth's resignation in 1888 it moved in 1896 to its present site on Blackford Hill.

== See also ==
- Royal Observatory, Edinburgh
- City Observatory
- List of astronomical observatories
- List of astronomical societies
