= Catherine Heymans =

British astrophysicist

Catherine Heymans FRSE
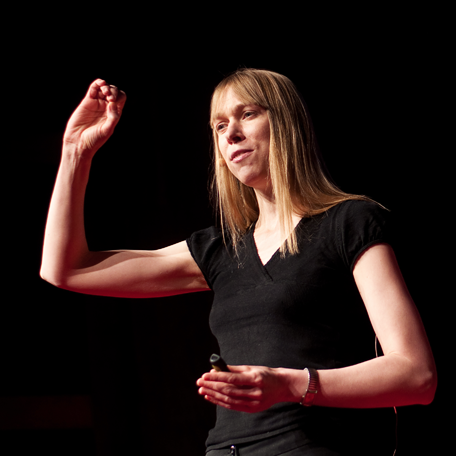
- Heymans in 2014
- Born: 1978 (age 47–48); Hitchin, Hertfordshire, England
- Education: University of Edinburgh (MPhys); University of Oxford (DPhil)
- Known for: Weak gravitational lensing
- Awards: George Darwin Lectureship (2017); Herschel Medal (2022)
- Scientific career
- Fields: Astrophysics
- Workplaces: University of Edinburgh; Max Planck Institute for Astronomy; University of British Columbia; Institut d'astrophysique de Paris
- Thesis: Weak gravitational lensing and intrinsic galaxy alignments
- Doctoral advisor: Lance Miller
- Website: www.roe.ac.uk/~heymans

Catherine Elizabeth Heymans FRSE (born 1978) is a British astrophysicist, the Astronomer Royal for Scotland, and a professor at the University of Edinburgh based at the Royal Observatory, Edinburgh.

== Early life ==
Heymans grew up in Hitchin, Hertfordshire and was educated at Hitchin Girls' School.

She received a first class Master of Physics (MPhys) degree from the University of Edinburgh in 2000. In 2003, she received her doctorate from the University of Oxford for research, supervised by Lance Miller, and in collaboration with Alan Heavens, on gravitational lensing.

== Career and research ==
She won a series of fellowships at the Max Planck Institute for Astronomy, the University of British Columbia, the Institut d'astrophysique de Paris and the University of Edinburgh. In 2009 she was awarded a starting grant from the European Research Council (ERC) and was subsequently appointed a lecturer at the University of Edinburgh.

Heymans is best known for her work on using the technique of cosmic weak gravitational lensing to learn more about the Universe. She led the Shear Testing Programme STEP1 competition and co-leads the lensing collaboration of the Canada–France–Hawaii Telescope Legacy Survey: CFHTLenS.

Heymans is one of the leaders of the European Southern Observatory (ESO) project Kilo-Degree Survey (KiDS). In 2018 she was presented with the Max Planck-Humboldt Research Award, which is worth €1.5 million and financed by funds from the German Federal Ministry of Education and Research (BMBF). The award is presented jointly by the Max Planck Society and the Alexander von Humboldt Foundation. The award will be used to establish the German Centre for Cosmological Lensing at the Ruhr University Bochum.

Heymans teaches on the Massive open online course (MOOC) at Coursera on AstroTech: The Science and Technology behind Astronomical Discovery. Her research has been funded by the Science and Technology Facilities Council (STFC).

Heymans' first popular science book, "How to design a universe: the science of real and virtual worlds" was published in the UK by Bloomsbury Sigma in September 2026.

=== Awards and honours ===
The Royal Astronomical Society awarded Heymans the George Darwin Lectureship in 2017 and the Herschel Medal in 2022. In 2018 she was elected a Fellow of the Royal Society of Edinburgh (FRSE).

In May 2021, she was the first woman appointed as the Astronomer Royal for Scotland, and the 11th person to hold the post.

== Personal life ==
Heymans has a partner and three children. Her partner volunteered to do the major part of the childcare. In March 2022, she contracted long COVID. In May 2023, she was suffering from long Covid, but had been able to continue some research activities by working in half-hour spurts.

With her colleague from Edinburgh University, Joe Zuntz, Heymans has performed comedy routines based on astronomy.

== See also ==
- Timeline of women in science
