= Craigmillar Creamery =

Margarine manufacturer in Scotland

The Craigmillar Creamery Company Limited, located in Craigmillar, Midlothian, Scotland, was established in 1884 as "The largest margarine factory in Scotland".

In 1894, they launched a lawsuit against refrigeration and ice-making manufacturer, Siddeley & Co. for an alleged breach in contract The creamery stated that in March 1893, Siddeley & Co. had agreed to not build an ice factory within three miles of Edinburgh. However, they proceeded without the creamery's knowledge at Quality Street, Leith.

In 1935, the company celebrated its jubilee. The occasion was celebrated with a luncheon and presentation of gold watches to the selling staff at Craigmillar Creamery.

== Notable Employees ==
- Mary Gillon, one of the first Scottish tram conductresses.
- William N. Stokoe, the scientist behind Britain's push on the consumption of margarine during the Second World War.
