= Mary Gillon =

Scottish tram conductress

Mary Gillon Armistead
- Born: 17 July 1898; Edinburgh, Scotland
- Died: 2 January 2002 (aged 103); Perth, Scotland
- Known for: One of the first female tram conductors in Scotland

Mary Gillon Armistead (17 July 1898 to 2 January 2002) was a Scottish tram conductress or clippie during World War I.

== Early life ==
Mary Gillon was born 17 July 1898 in Edinburgh, Scotland to Allan Anderson Gillon, a fishmonger, and Agnes Ewing. At 14 years old, she left school to start working at her father's fish shop in Portobello.

== Career ==
After working in her father's shop, Gillon was employed at the Buttercup Dairy Company. She later joined Edinburgh's cable tram services as a tram conductress in 1916 at the age of 17. She was given a uniform, but would pair it with long steps as her skirt would often get wet. At each station, she had three minutes to turn the seats back in the direction of travel, clean the area for litter and search for lost items, and change the points and pull down the steps for the next passengers to enter. The shifts were long; they were nine hours and the late shift did not finish until 11:35 pm. Tram conductresses did not have time for a break; they ate their meals on the platform.

She left her post after the war in August 1919 and went on to work at the Craigmillar Creamery.

== Later life and death ==
Gillon married George Armistead, a motor lorry driver and joiner, on 12 June 1924.

She died in Perth, Scotland on 2 January 2002.
