= Hermann Brück =

German-born astronomer

Hermann Brück CBE FRSE GCSG
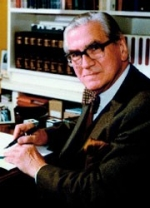
- Born: 15 August 1905; Berlin, German Empire
- Died: 4 March 2000 (aged 94); Penicuik, Scotland, UK
- Education: Ludwig-Maximilians-Universität München; University of Bonn; Kiel University
- Scientific career
- Fields: Astronomy
- Workplaces: University of Edinburgh; Dublin Institute for Advanced Studies; University of Cambridge; Humboldt University of Berlin
- Doctoral advisor: Arnold Sommerfeld

Hermann Alexander Brück CBE FRSE GCSG (15 August 1905 – 4 March 2000) was a German-born astronomer, who spent the great portion of his career in various positions in Britain and Ireland.

== Education ==
Hermann Brück was born in Berlin. His father was Hermann Heinrich Brück and his mother, Margaret.

Young Hermann was educated at the Kaiserin Augusta Gymnasium in Berlin-Charlottenburg, a school specialising in the Classics (Latin and Greek), where he also had excellent teachers in mathematics and physics.

From 1924 to 1928, Brück was educated at Kiel University, the University of Bonn, and the Ludwig-Maximilians-Universität München. His doctoral work on the wave mechanics of crystals was under the supervision of Arnold Sommerfeld. His interest in astronomy came early in life, and he turned his attention to astronomical spectroscopy. He was granted his PhD at Ludwig-Maixmilians-Universität München in 1928.

== Career ==
Upon graduation at Ludwig-Maximilians-Universität München, Brück followed his friend Albrecht Unsöld to the Potsdam Astrophysical Observatory; Unsöld had earned his doctorate the year before, also under Sommerfeld. While there, Brück participated in the physics colloquium at the Humboldt University of Berlin with the physicists Max von Laue and Albert Einstein and the astronomer Walter Grotrian.

With growing difficulties under National Socialism, Brück left Germany in 1936 to take a temporary research assistantship at the Vatican Observatory. In 1937, he moved to the University of Cambridge to join the circle of modern astrophysicists around Arthur Eddington. In time, Brück became Assistant Director of the Observatories and John Couch Adams Astronomer, specialising in solar spectroscopy. Under his tenure, he taught a course in classical astronomy and started the student astronomical society, which fostered the careers of many astronomers.

In 1947, at the invitation of Éamon de Valera, Brück moved to Dublin to direct the Dunsink Observatory, which was part of the Dublin Institute for Advanced Studies, where he associated with Erwin Schrödinger. In 1950, the Observatory, along with the Royal Irish Academy, hosted the first meeting of the Royal Astronomical Society.

In 1955, the International Astronomical Union held their triennial Assembly in Dublin. At this gathering, the Observatory demonstrated photoelectric equipment for photometry, which had been developed by M.J. Smyth, who had been Brück's student in Cambridge. Also displayed was the UV solar spectroscopy which extended the Utrecht Atlas and formed part of the revised Rowland tables of the Solar spectrum; Brück's second wife, Dr. Mary Brück (née Conway), was a leading figure in this work.

In 1957, Brück moved to the University of Edinburgh to be Astronomer Royal for Scotland. With his vision and drive, he transformed the Royal Observatory into an internationally ranked centre of research. He put together a team of astronomers and engineers headed initially by P.B. Fellgett, and later by Vincent Reddish.

This team created the automated instrumentation for scanning stellar and intergalactic images. This technology enabled spectra to be reduced in minutes rather than months, which gave astronomers time to focus on other activities. The team also advanced the technology for the remote operation of telescopes. In addition to his scientific duties, he expanded the teaching of astronomy with a new honours degree in Astrophysics initiated in 1967. Upon first arriving in Edinburgh, he started the student astronomical society and gave it access to the Observatory. For a period, Brück served as Dean of the Faculty of Science.

Brück retired in 1975. At this time, his second wife and colleague, Dr. Mary T. Conway, initiated a historical study of nineteenth-century astronomy, which resulted in the publication of a book on Charles Piazzi Smyth, one of Brück's predecessors.

Their work resulted in a book on the history of Edinburgh Astronomy, and a paper in Vistas in Astronomy on Lord Crawford's Observatory in Dunecht, which was the parent to the nineteenth-century rebirth of the Royal Observatory in Edinburgh.

Throughout his career, Brück served as a member and councillor of the Pontifical Academy of Sciences.

He died at home in Penicuik.

== Honours ==
- 1948 – Member Royal Irish Academy
- 1955 – Member of the Akadmie der Wissenschaften und der Literatur, Mainz
- 1958 – Fellow of the Royal Society of Edinburgh (FRSE), in which he also served on the Council from 1959 to 1962
- 1966 – Commander of the Order of the British Empire (CBE), 1966 New Year Honours
- 1995 – Knight Grand Cross of the Order of St. Gregory the Great (GCSG)

== Books ==
- Die Sterne: Monatsschrift für alle Gebiete der Himmelskunde (Johann Ambrosius Barth Vlg., Leipzig, 1933)
- The Story of Astronomy in Edinburgh from its beginning until 1975 (Edinburgh University Press, 1983)
- (with Mary T. Brück) Peripatetic Astronomer, The: Life of Charles Piazzi Smyth (Institute of Physics Publishing, Bristol, United Kingdom, 1988)
