= William Michael Herbert Greaves =

British astronomer

Professor William Michael Herbert Greaves FRS FREng FRSE
- Born: 10 September 1897
- Died: 24 December 1955 (aged 58)
- Education: University of Edinburgh
- Spouse: Caroline Grace Kitto
- Children: George Richard Herbert Greaves
- Awards: Fellow of the Royal Society; FREng (2013)
- Scientific career
- Fields: astronomy
- Workplaces: University of Cambridge

William Michael Herbert Greaves (10 September 1897 – 24 December 1955) was a British astronomer. He is most noted for his work on stellar spectrophotometry.

== Life ==
He was born in Barbados in the West Indies the son of Dr E. C. Greaves, a physician trained at the University of Edinburgh. William Greaves was educated first at Lodge School and Codrington College, both in Barbados then travelled to England to study at St. John's College, Cambridge, where he graduated MA in 1919 and became a Fellow in 1922.

== Career ==
He was elected a Fellow of the Royal Astronomical Society in 1921.

From 1924 until 1938 he was the chief assistant at the Royal Observatory, Greenwich. In 1938 he became Astronomer Royal for Scotland, and in 1939 he was elected a Fellow of the Royal Society of Edinburgh. His proposers were James Pickering Kendall, Max Born, Edmund Dymond, Ruric Wrigley, Edwin Arthur Baker and Sir Edmund Taylor Whittaker. He served as the Society's Secretary 1940 to 1945 and Vice President 1946 to 1949.

He remained Astronomer Royal until 1955, and was Regius Professor of Astronomy at the University of Edinburgh for the same period. In 1943 he was elected a Fellow of the Royal Society. From 1947 until 1949 he was president of the Royal Astronomical Society.

He died in the Blackford district of Edinburgh on 24 December 1955.

== Family ==
In 1926 he married Caroline Grace Kitto, and the couple had a son, George Richard Herbert Greaves (1941-2008) who became Reader in Mathematics at Cardiff University.

== Awards and honors ==
- Tyson Gold Medal for Astronomy.
- Awarded Smith's prize in 1921.
- The crater Greaves on the Moon is named after him.
