= Regius Professor of Astronomy =

Regius Professor of Astronomy may refer to:

- Regius Professor of Astronomy (Edinburgh), at the University of Edinburgh
- Regius Professor of Astronomy (Glasgow), at the University of Glasgow
