= Andrew Lawrence (astronomer) =

British astrophysicist

Andrew Lawrence FRSE
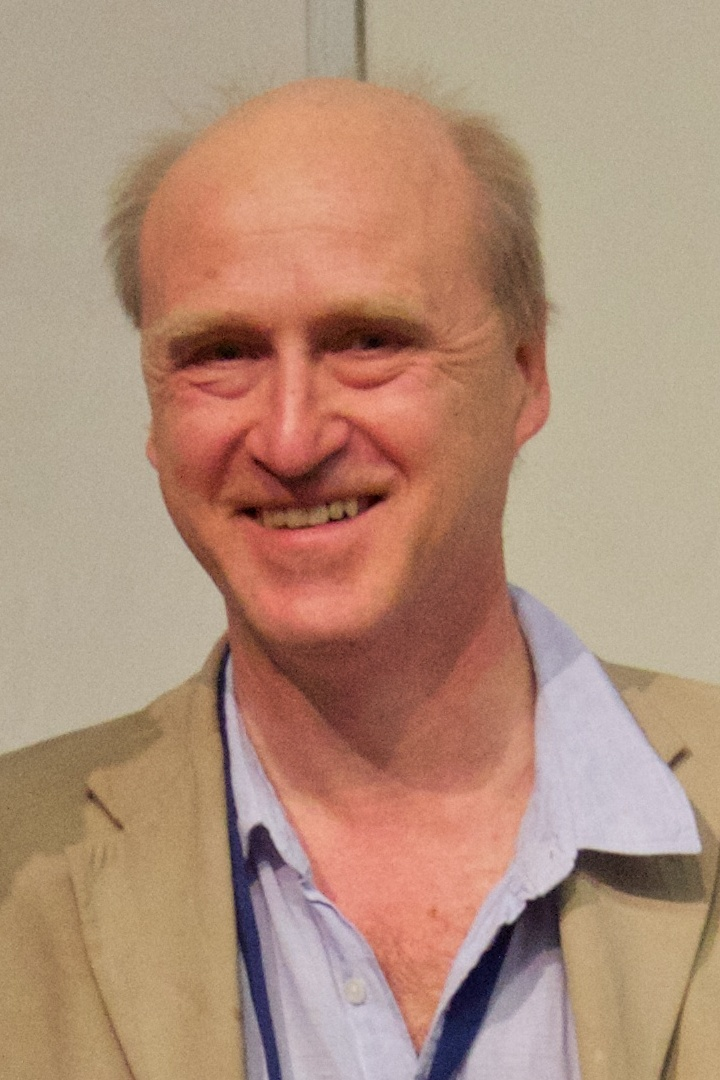
- Lawrence in 2012
- Born: 23 April 1954 (age 70); Margate, England
- Education: Chatham House Grammar School
- Known for: Quasars
- Awards: Fellow of the Royal Society of Edinburgh (1997), Group Award of the Royal Astronomical Society (2012)
- Scientific career
- Fields: Astrophysics
- Institutions: University of Edinburgh
- Doctoral advisor: Ken Pounds
- Website: andyxlastro.me

Andrew Lawrence FRSE (born 23 April 1954)) is a British astrophysicist. He is Regius Professor of Astronomy at the University of Edinburgh based at the Royal Observatory, Edinburgh.

== Education and career ==
Lawrence was born 23 April 1954 in Margate, Kent, to Jack Lawrence and Louisa Lawrence (née Sandison). He attended Chatham House Grammar School, and then studied Astrophysics at the University of Edinburgh. He undertook postgraduate research at the Department of Physics, University of Leicester, supervised by Ken Pounds. He completed his PhD in 1980, with a doctoral thesis entitled “X-ray observations of Active Galaxies”. He then worked at the Centre for Space Research, Massachusetts Institute of Technology; the Royal Greenwich Observatory, during its incarnation at Herstmonceux, East Sussex; the School of Mathematical Sciences and then the Department of Physics, Queen Mary University of London; and in 1994 was appointed to the Regius Professor of Astronomy at the University of Edinburgh. In 2008-9 he had a sabbatical year at the Kavli Institute for Particle Astrophysics and Cosmology at Stanford University.

== Research ==
Lawrence’s primary research has been in the field of Quasars and Active Galactic Nuclei, but he has also worked extensively in Survey Astronomy, creating the Wide Field Astronomy Unit in 1999. He was the Principal Investigator for the UKIRT Infrared Deep Sky Survey (UKIDSS), which received the Group Award of the Royal Astronomical Society in 2012. He is one of the leaders of the global Virtual Observatory initiative and a founder and past chair of the International Virtual Observatory Alliance.

== Publications ==
As of 2019, Lawrence had published over 300 scientific publications and had an h-index of 73. He has also published three books: Losing The Sky about sky pollution by satellites, and two academic textbooks, Probability in Physics, and Astronomical Measurement, both with Springer. He has also published a short historical/popular booklet on the life and achievements of Charles Piazzi Smyth, the second Astronomer Royal for Scotland.

== Outreach and Arts ==
Lawrence teaches on the Massive open online course (MOOC) at Coursera on AstroTech: The Science and Technology behind Astronomical Discovery. He has been involved in a number of Arts-science collaborations, notably with New York composer Matt Giannotti, and with a Spanish film maker on the documentary A Residence Above The Clouds.
