= Buttercup Dairy Company =

Scottish dairy products company

The Buttercup Dairy Company was a Scottish dairy products company founded in 1904 by Scottish business entrepreneur Andrew Ewing (1869-1956).

== Background ==
The company sold condensed milk, eggs, butter, and margarine in its stores; by the 1920s, it had over 250 branches in Scotland and founded a poultry farm located in Clermiston. The poultry farm owned over 200,000 hens and was affectionately known as "Hen City". The company mostly hired women to staff its stores and farm and required them to adhere to a dress code.

== The Great Depression and fire issues ==
The Great Depression hindered the company's growing success. Additionally, a fire in 1936 forced the end of their poultry business. Despite these issues, Ewing, known as a charitable Christian, continued to give to charity. During the Depression years and Second World War, he would give rations to the locals.

Ewing died penniless, with his company worth little. In the 1950s, the Edinburgh Corporation bought the farm for local authority housing.The last Buttercup Dairy Company stores closed in 1965.

== Legacy ==
In 2014, Buttercup Farm Park was opened. It was built onsite of the old farm, near Drumbrae Primary School.

In 2019, Regenerate Tranent offered a grant to restore Buttercup Dairy Company's storefront at 68-70 High Street. The restoration was completed in 2020.

== Notable employee(s) ==
- Mary Gillon
