= UK Astronomy Technology Centre =

Scottish research centre

- UK ATC logo
- Abbreviation: UK ATC
- Formation: 1998
- Legal status: Research council establishment
- Location: Royal Observatory, Edinburgh, Scotland
- Coordinates: 55°55′23″N 3°11′16″W
- Region served: United Kingdom and beyond
- Parent organization: Science and Technology Facilities Council
- Website: UK ATC

The UK Astronomy Technology Centre (UK ATC) is based at the Royal Observatory in Edinburgh, Scotland, and is part of the Science and Technology Facilities Council.

The UK ATC designs, builds, develops, tests and manages major instrumentation projects in support of UK and international Astronomy. It has design offices, workshops and test facilities for both ground- and space-based instruments, including a suite of test labs capable of handling the largest current and projected instruments.

The UK ATC was formed in 1998 in Edinburgh from the technology departments of the Royal Observatory, Edinburgh (ROE), and the Royal Greenwich Observatory, Cambridge (RGO). Its initial "customers" were the then new Gemini Observatory, the former ROE observatories in Hawaii (the James Clerk Maxwell Telescope (JCMT) and the United Kingdom Infrared Telescope (UKIRT)), and a former RGO observatory, the Isaac Newton Group on La Palma, Canary Islands. More recently, collaboration with the European Southern Observatory (ESO) and for the James Webb Space Telescope (JWST) have gained importance. Major projects and collaborations include:

- Several first-generation instruments for the Gemini Observatory.
- A mid-infrared spectrometer for the UKIRT and the Gemini Observatory.
- Data acquisition and reduction software for the UKIRT and the JCMT.
- The Wide Field Infrared Camera for the UKIRT.
- The Spectral and Photometric Imaging Receiver of the Herschel Space Observatory.
- The Visible and Infrared Survey Telescope for UK universities and ESO.
- A high-sensitivity, wide-field, sub-millimetre camera for the JCMT (SCUBA2).
- The MIRI (Mid-Infrared Instrument) for the JWST.
- Observing tool software for the Atacama Large Millimeter Array.
- Design studies for ESO's European Extremely Large Telescope.
- An infrared K-band multi-object spectrometer for ESO's Very Large Telescope.
- The European Union funded Optical Infrared Coordination Network for Astronomy (OPTICON).

Following increased government emphasis on knowledge transfer and declining funds for the Science and Technology Facilities Council the UK ATC is increasingly working on projects with astronomical institutions beyond the UK and the EU, with institutions dedicated to science and technology other than astronomy, and with technology-related businesses.

== Gallery ==
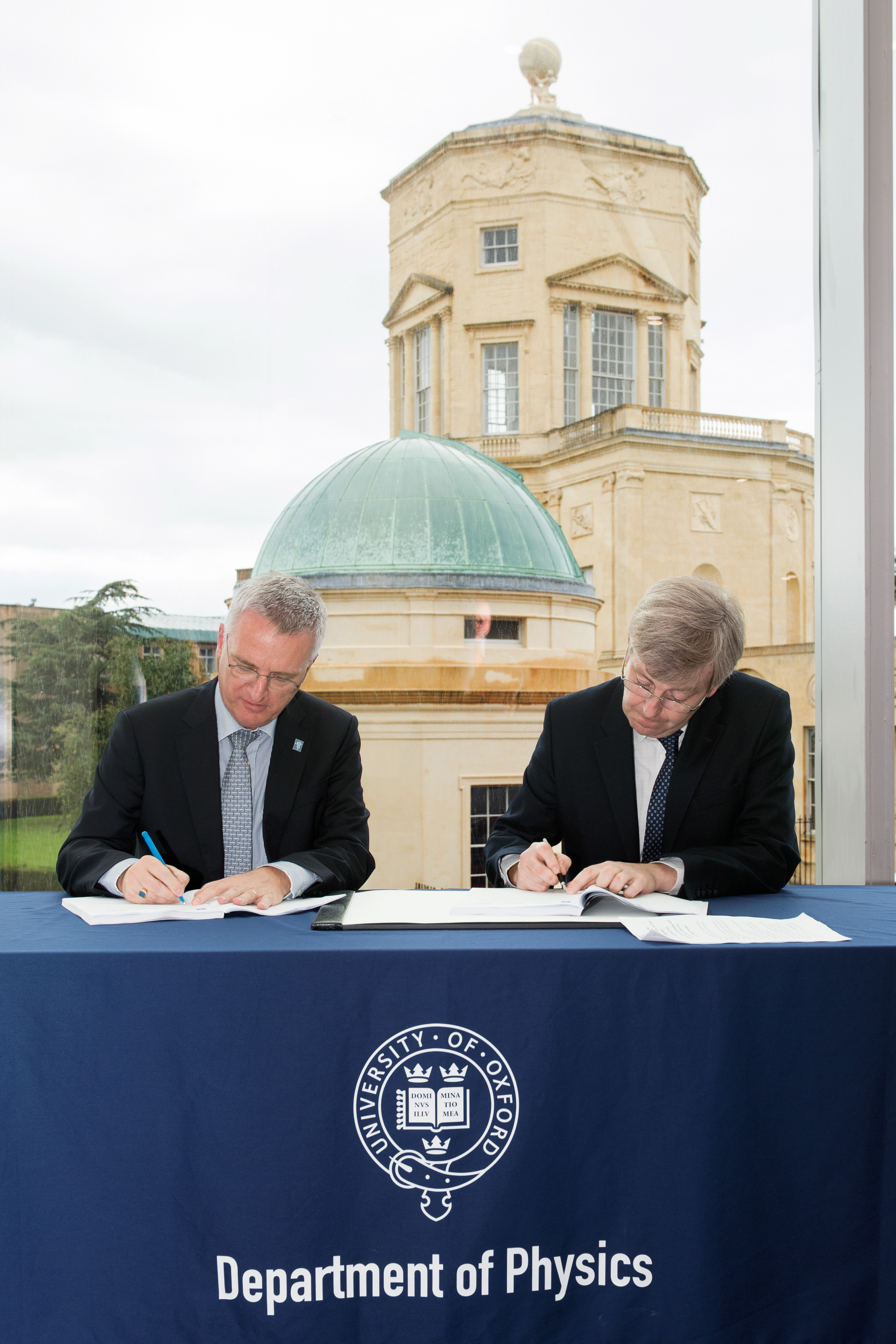
UK Astronomy Technology Centre is a member of consortia that build instruments for the Extremely Large Telescope.

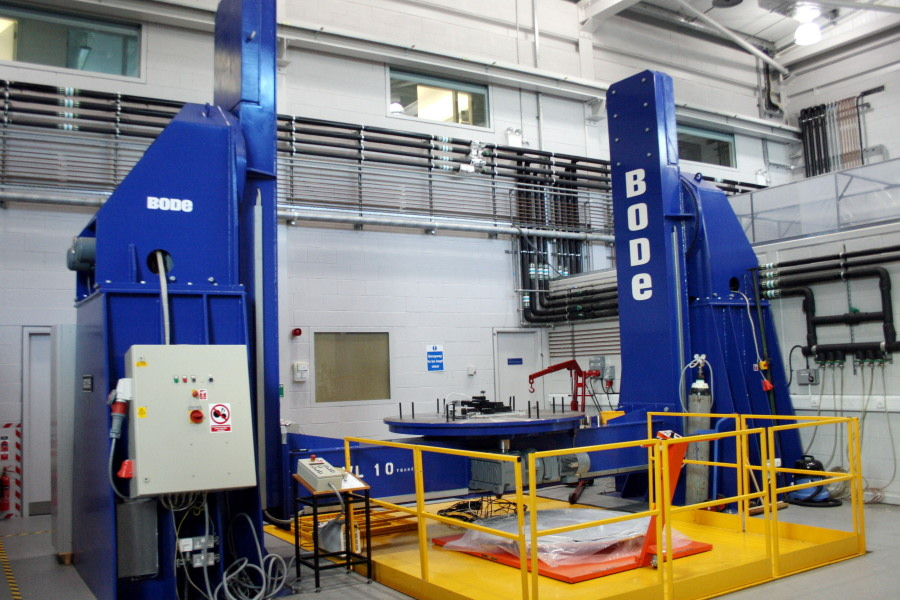
"Flexure rig" to simulate operational movement on a telescope

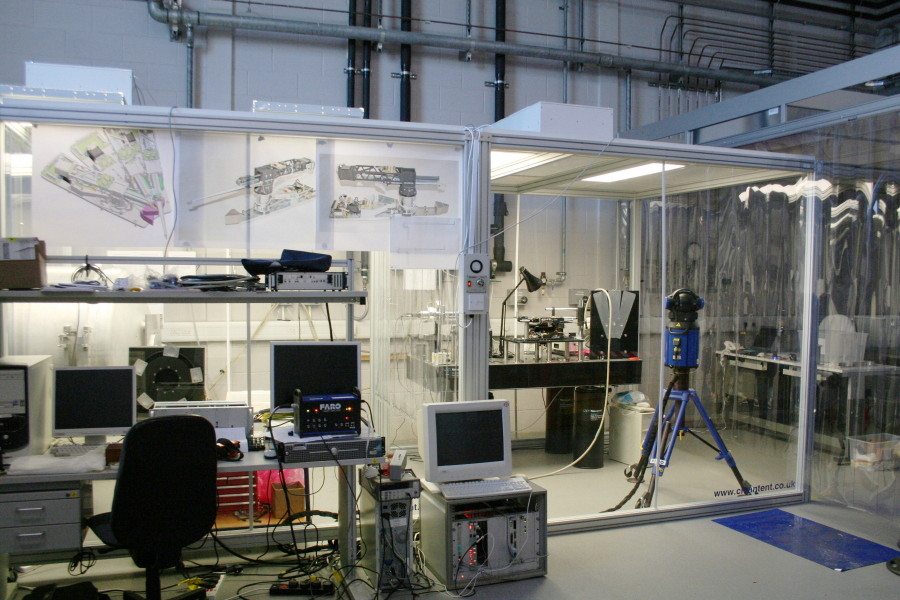
Lab with clean room

== See also ==
- Royal Observatory Edinburgh
