= Royal Observatory, Edinburgh =

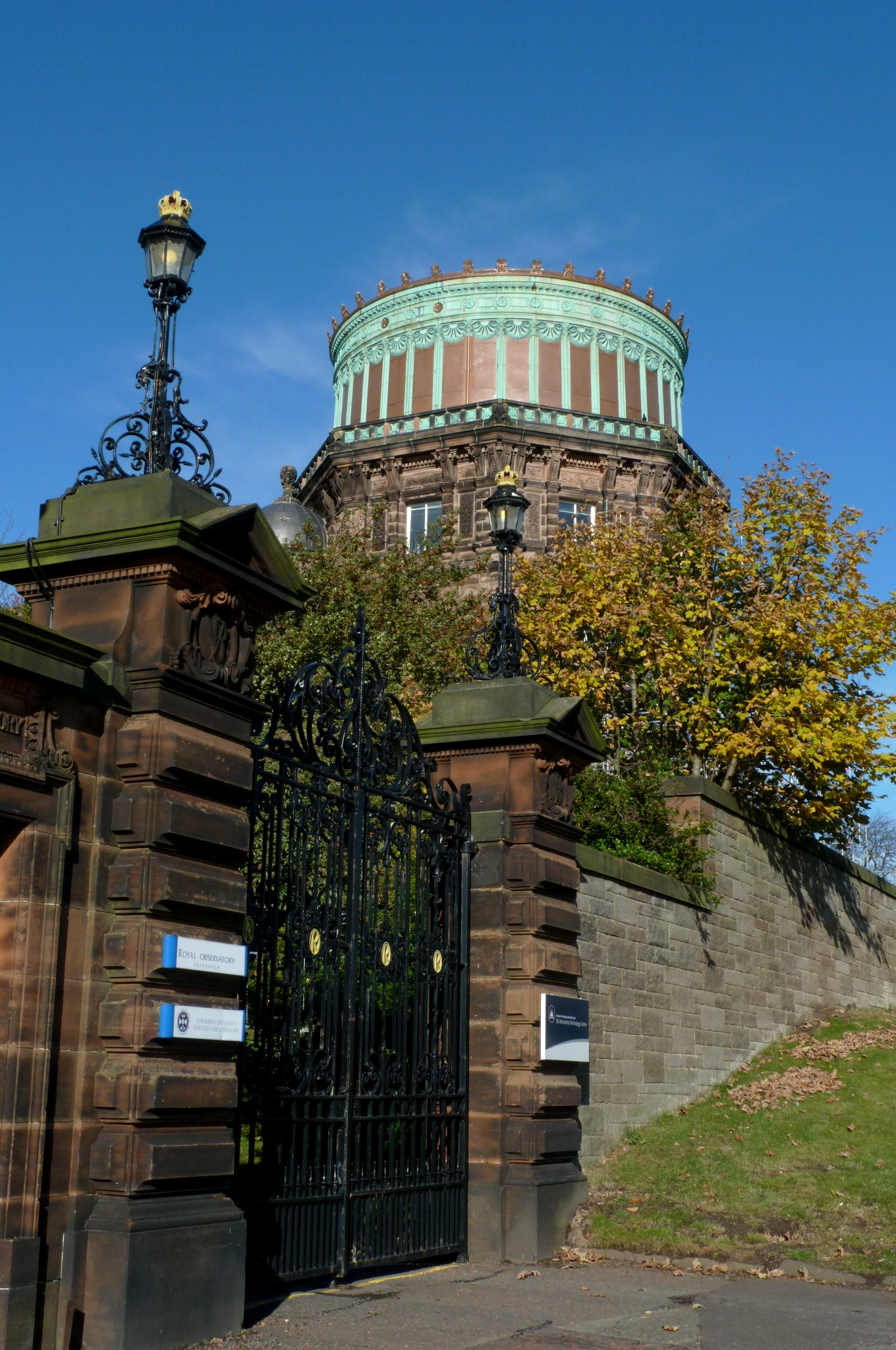
- Gate and East Tower
- Alternative names: Royal Observatory, Edinburgh
- Organization: Science and Technology Facilities Council; University of Edinburgh
- Observatory code: 277
- Location: Blackford Hill, Edinburgh, Scotland
- Coordinates: 55°55′23″N 3°11′16″W
- Altitude: 146 m (479 ft)
- Established: 1896
- Website: www.roe.ac.uk

Telescopes
- Student lab: 50 cm reflector
- East Dome: 90 cm Cassegrain reflector
- West Dome: 40/60 cm Schmidt camera (removed 2010)
- Related media on Commons

The Royal Observatory, Edinburgh (ROE) is an astronomical institution located on Blackford Hill in Edinburgh. The site is owned by the Science and Technology Facilities Council (STFC). The ROE comprises the UK Astronomy Technology Centre (UK ATC) of STFC, the Institute for Astronomy of the School of Physics and Astronomy of the University of Edinburgh, and the ROE Visitor Centre.

The observatory carries out astronomical research and university teaching; design, project management, and construction of instruments and telescopes for astronomical observatories; and teacher training in astronomy and outreach to the public. The ROE Library includes the Crawford Collection of books and manuscripts gifted in 1888 by the 26th Earl of Crawford. Before it moved to the present site in 1896, the Royal Observatory was located on Calton Hill, close to the centre of Edinburgh, at what is now known as the City Observatory.

== History ==
=== Calton Hill ===
The University of Edinburgh in 1785 and by Royal Warrant of George III created the Regius Chair of Astronomy and appointed Robert Blair first Regius Professor of Astronomy. After his death in 1828 the position remained vacant until 1834. In 1811 private citizens had founded the Astronomical Institution of Edinburgh with John Playfair – professor of natural philosophy – as its president. The Institution acquired grounds on Calton Hill to build an observatory, which was designed by John's nephew William Henry Playfair; it remains to this day as the Playfair building of the City Observatory.

During his visit of Edinburgh in 1822, George IV bestowed upon the observatory the title of "Royal Observatory of King George the Fourth". In 1834 – with Government funding – the instrumentation of the observatory was completed. This cleared the way to uniting the observatory with the Regius Chair, and Thomas Henderson was appointed the first Astronomer Royal for Scotland and second Regius Professor of Astronomy. The main instruments of the new observatory were a 6.4-inch (16 cm) transit telescope and a 3.5-inch (9 cm) azimuth circle.

In 1852 Charles Piazzi Smyth – second Astronomer Royal for Scotland – came up with the idea of building astronomical observatories on high mountains with good weather. He travelled to Tenerife a few years later for site testing. Nothing came of it until about 100 years later, when this mode of operation became common practice the world over. A time service was established in 1858. Timings of star transits were used to keep the observatory clock accurate. The clock was wired up to control the drop of a time ball on Nelson's Monument. This is visible from the port of Leith, thus providing accurate time for shipping. Another wire led to a time gun on Edinburgh Castle.

Chronic underfunding by the Government eventually led to Smyth's resignation in 1888. The Government then intended to close the Royal Observatory and to abolish the post of Astronomer Royal for Scotland.

Asteroids discovered: 7
(6222) 1980 PB3	8 August 1980
(14801) 1980 PE3	15 August 1980
(22262) 1980 PZ2	4 August 1980
(24625) 1980 PC3	8 August 1980
(29086) 1980 PY2	4 August 1980
(52241) 1980 PW2	4 August 1980
(129439) 1980 PX2	4 August 1980

=== Blackford Hill ===
When the Earl of Crawford learned of the plans to close the Royal Observatory, he offered to give the instruments of his own Dunecht observatory and his unique astronomical library to the nation on condition that the Government build and maintain a new Royal Observatory to replace the one on Calton Hill. Ralph Copeland was appointed third Astronomer Royal for Scotland and oversaw the move of the two observatories from Dunecht and Calton Hill to Blackford Hill. The new site was opened in April 1896.

The instruments to move into the domes were a 15-inch (38 cm) refractor (East Dome) and a 24-inch (0.6 m) reflector (West Dome). An 8.5-inch (22 cm) transit circle was housed in a separate building further west. The time service continued to control the time ball on Calton Hill and the time gun on Edinburgh Castle by telegraph wire. It also controlled a time gun in Dundee and a clock at Rosyth dockyard. In the 1910s and 1920s research at the ROE led to more accurate pendulum clocks, which remained in service until they had to give way to quartz clocks in the 1960s.

On May 21, 1913, at 01:00, a bomb planted by suffragettes detonated. No one was inside the building but there was damage to floors and stone walls.

During the first half of the 20th century the ROE pursued the new fields of photographic and photoelectric recording of stellar positions, brightnesses and spectra. From the 1950s onwards the ROE has concentrated even more on instrumentation and automation. In 1965 the ROE moved from the responsibility of the Scottish Office into the new Science Research Council (SRC), which in 1981 became the Science and Engineering Research Council (SERC).

=== Outstations and national facilities ===
From 1961 to 1973 the ROE's Earlyburn Outstation some 20 miles (30 km) south of Edinburgh was used for optical tracking of artificial satellites. From 1967 to 1976 the observatory operated a 16/24-inch (0.4/0.6 m) Schmidt camera – matching the one in Edinburgh – at its Monte Porzio Catone observing station near Rome. A division of labour developed: By 1976 the ROE as an SRC/SERC establishment spent most of its resources on running and supporting national facilities, while astronomical research was left to the university's Department of Astronomy.

The ROE operated the UK Schmidt Telescope (UKST) since it was opened in 1973. This took photographic plates in blue light of the entire southern sky. Together with red-light plates taken by the European Southern Observatory (ESO) they form the ESO/SERC Southern Sky Survey, which in turn extends the Palomar Observatory Sky Survey beyond its southern limit. In 1988 the telescope was handed over to the Anglo-Australian Observatory, which until 2010 operated it for Australia and the United Kingdom (UK); in July 2010, the Australian Astronomical Observatory was formed, to operate the telescope as part of a facility entirely under Australian control. The photographic laboratory and plate library for the UKST remained at the ROE in Edinburgh.

Since 1967 the ROE had been operating a machine (GALAXY – General Automatic Luminosity And X-Y) to digitise photographic plates. After the opening of the UKST, this was upgraded to become the COSMOS (COordinates, Sizes, Magnitudes, Orientations and Shapes) machine in 1975. It operated until 1993 and was replaced by a new SuperCOSMOS machine. When in 1980 the Starlink Project was formed to support astronomical image processing in the UK, the ROE became one of the six original nodes of the Starlink network.

Over the years 1973–1979 the ROE built the 3.8-metre UK Infrared Telescope (UKIRT) on Mauna Kea in Hawaii. This is an early example of the use of thin mirrors in large telescopes. The ROE operated UKIRT in cooperation with the University of Hawaii and built instruments for it, including the first ever common-user infrared camera. In 1987 the James Clerk Maxwell Telescope (JCMT) – also on Mauna Kea – was handed over to the ROE after the Rutherford Appleton Laboratory had completed its construction. The JCMT is a 15-metre diameter, millimetre- and sub-millimetre-wavelength telescope, which was run by a partnership of the UK, the Netherlands and Canada until 2014.

=== Reviews and international involvement ===
After Malcolm Longair – ninth Astronomer Royal for Scotland – left in 1990, astronomy in Edinburgh underwent a period of re-organisation and uncertainty. Andrew Lawrence became Regius Professor of Astronomy in the University of Edinburgh, whereas the title of Astronomer Royal for Scotland went to John Brown of the University of Glasgow. For a while Paul Murdin was acting director of the ROE. In 1993 the observatories of the UK – the Royal Greenwich Observatory (RGO), the Royal Observatory Edinburgh, the Isaac Newton Group of Telescopes, and the Joint Astronomy Centre in Hawaii (operating UKIRT and JCMT) – came under the single directorship of Alec Boksenberg, until then director of the RGO.

In 1994 the SERC was split up and the ROE became part of the Particle Physics and Astronomy Research Council (PPARC). In 1995 the merged observatories were dissolved into four independent entities. Having lost the UKST in 1988 – the ROE now also lost the UKIRT and the JCMT, operated by the independent Joint Astronomy Centre. ROE retained its role of building instruments for telescopes and satellites. It also became the UK project office for the construction of the Gemini Observatory, a pair of 8.1-metre telescopes run by seven countries.

A review of the Royal Observatories in 1996 concluded that the running of observatories and building of instruments should be put out to competitive tender, raising the fear of privatisation or closure. In 1997 this came to a halt and instead it was decided to reduce the RGO and the ROE into a smaller single astronomy technology centre. In 1998 the RGO was closed, while the ROE escaped lightly: The Plate Library and SuperCOSMOS machine were handed over to the University of Edinburgh, while the technology and project management expertise of the ROE – and to a lesser degree of the RGO – was retained by the newly formed UK Astronomy Technology Centre, which superseded the ROE as the Edinburgh establishment of the PPARC. (The ROE name remains as an umbrella term for UKATC; IfA, Edinburgh University; and the Visitor Centre).

Following the work on Gemini, the UK ATC was put in charge of managing the construction of the 4-metre f/1 VISTA (Visible and Infrared Survey Telescope for Astronomy). In the tradition of the UKST this is a survey telescope with a wide field of view. It works in the infrared and uses an array of 16 large infrared detectors. The telescope is located at the Paranal Observatory of the European Southern Observatory (ESO). In 1962 five European countries had founded the ESO; the UK joined in 2002 as the tenth member country. VISTA was handed over to ESO in 2009 as part of the UK's joining fee.

=== Directors ===
Also Astronomer Royal for Scotland and Regius Professor of Astronomy in the University of Edinburgh:

1. 1834–1844, Thomas Henderson
2. 1846–1888, Charles Piazzi Smyth
3. 1889–1905, Ralph Copeland
4. 1905–1910, Frank Dyson
5. 1910–1937, Ralph Sampson
6. 1938–1955, W.M.H. Greaves
7. 1957–1975, Hermann Brück
8. 1975–1980, Vincent Reddish
9. 1980–1990, Malcolm Longair

Directors of ROE or UK ATC after amalgamation and dissolution of "The Royal Observatories":

- 1995–1997, Stuart Pitt
- 1998–2004, Adrian Russell
- 2005–2012, Ian Robson
- 2012–2024, Gillian Wright
- 2024–present, Christophe Dumas

== Present day ==
=== Telescopes ===
The original 1894 building includes two cylindrical copper domes on top of the East and West Towers. These were refurbished in 2010. The East Dome still shelters a 36-inch (0.9 m) Cassegrain reflector that was installed in 1930. This is part of the visitor centre exhibition, but is not operational any more. A 16/24-inch (0.4/0.6 m) Schmidt camera was installed in the West Dome in 1951. In 2010 this was removed to the National Museum of Scotland. The only working telescope is a Meade MAX 20in ACF (0.5 m) reflector in a hemispherical dome on top of the teaching laboratories. This telescope is used for undergraduate teaching. As of April 2012, the 1967 telescope and mount have been removed to Mid-Kent Astronomical Society; a replacement telescope will be installed later in 2012.

=== Crawford Collection ===
The Crawford Collection has first editions of most books relevant to the history of astronomy. This includes many works by the likes of Brahe, Copernicus, Galileo, Kepler and Newton. For the most part, Lord Lindsay collected this library in the 1870s and 1880s. An early addition was that of over 2500 items from Charles Babbage's library after his death in 1871.

=== Visitor Centre ===
The Visitor Centre hosts public events, including astronomy lectures and public open nights. The Observatory also holds classes, professional development courses, and other educational events for primary and secondary schools.

== Gallery ==
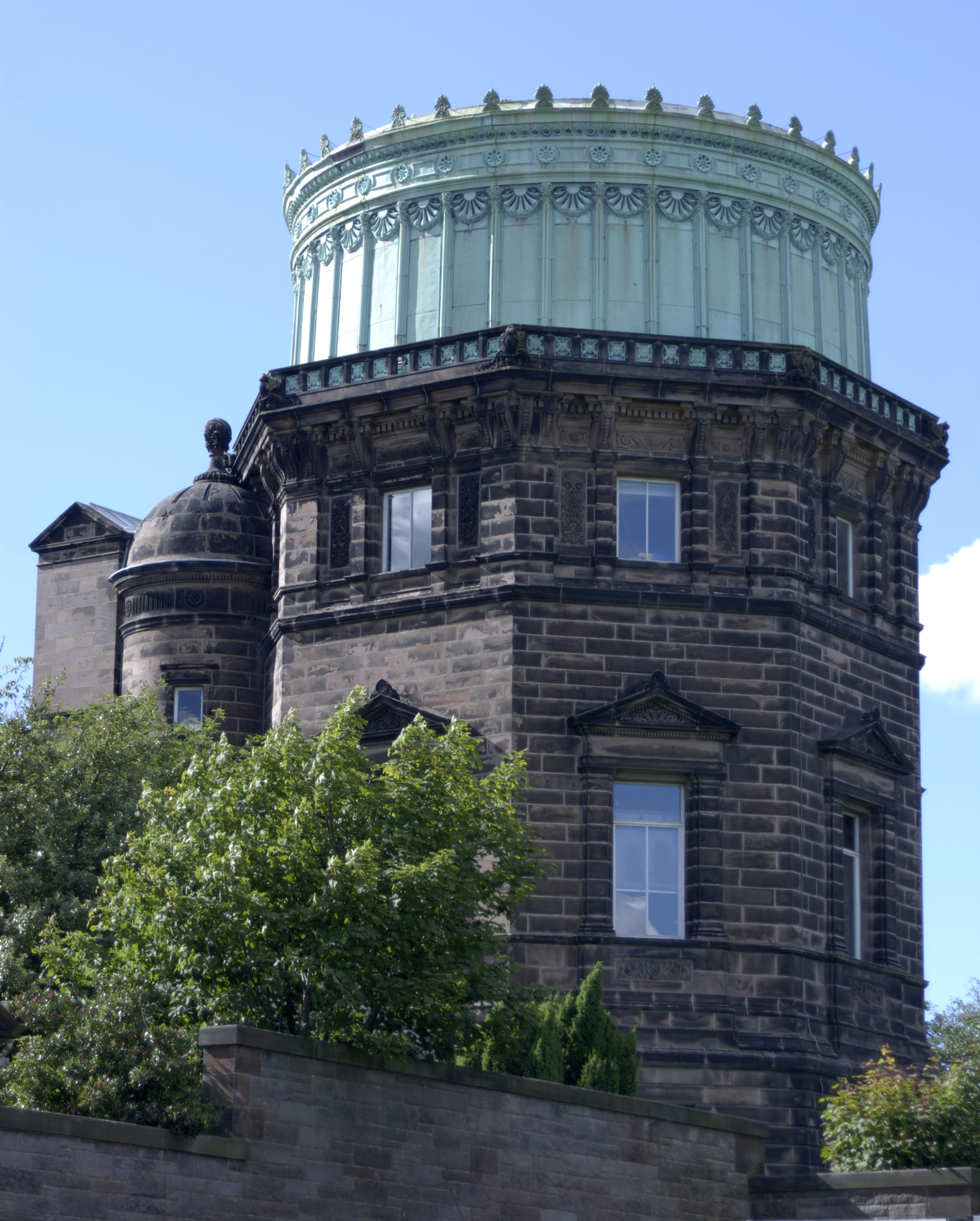
East Tower with copper dome

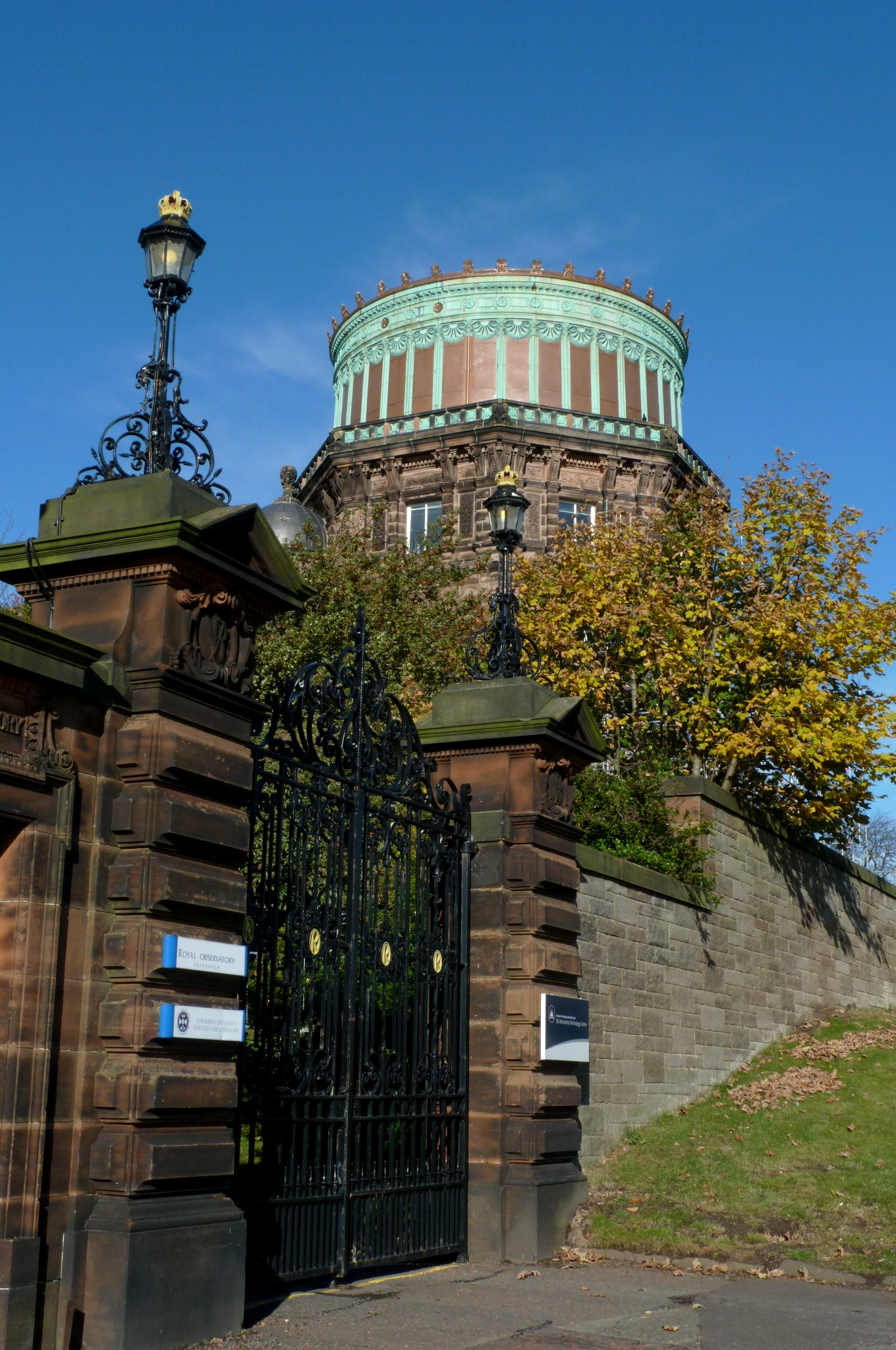
Tower after replacement of copper

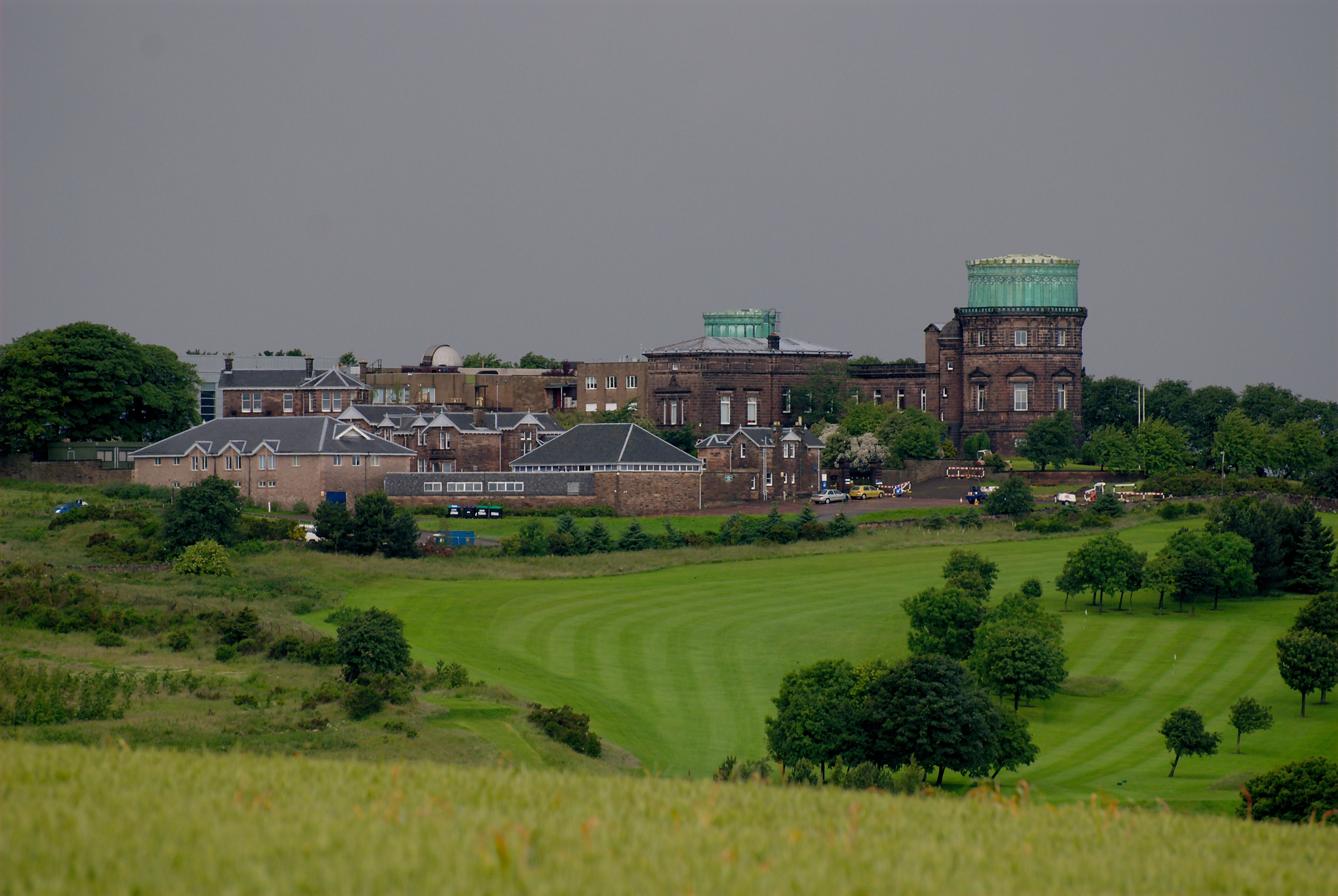
The observatory complex

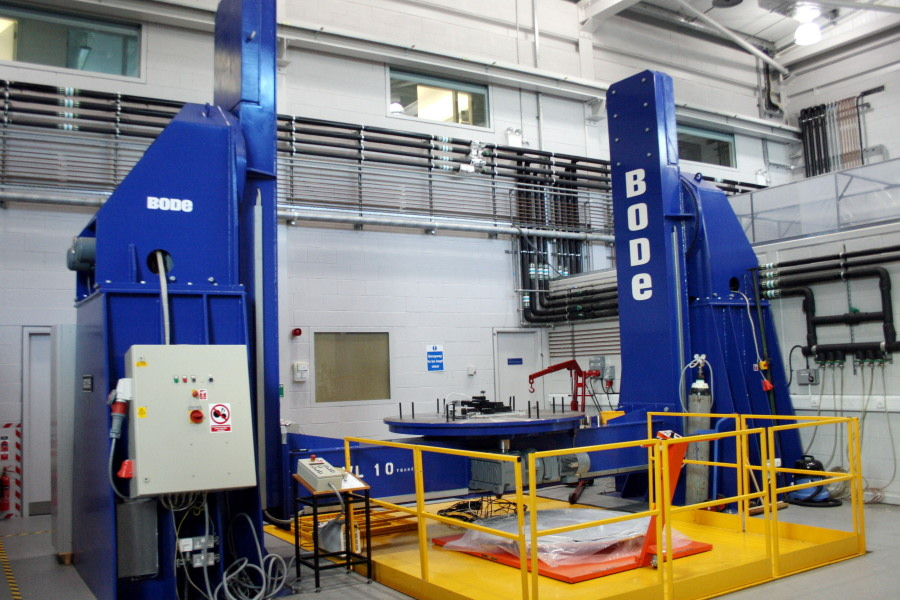
A "flexure rig" for simulating the operational movement of instruments on telescopes as they change altitude

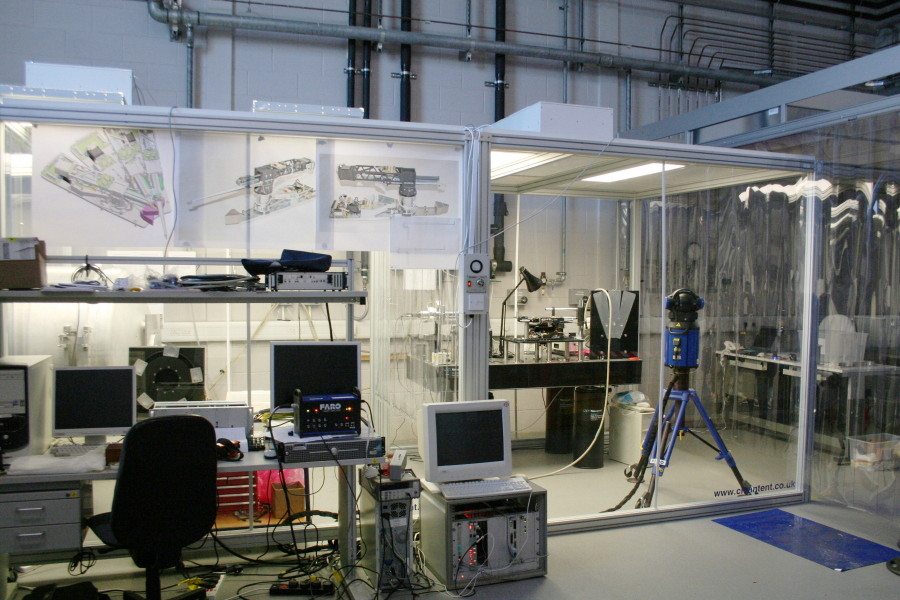
The Crawford labs of the UK Astronomy Technology Centre

== See also ==
- List of astronomical observatories
- List of astronomical societies
