= Vincent Cartledge Reddish =

British astronomer

Vincent Cartledge Reddish (28 April 1926 – 2 January 2015) was a British astronomer who spent much of his career in Edinburgh, where he made significant contributions to British optical astronomy.

He occupied the positions of Astronomer Royal for Scotland, Director of the Royal Observatory, Edinburgh and Regius Professor at the University of Edinburgh from 1975–80.

== Life and career ==
Reddish was born in Leigh in Lancashire, and later moved to Culceth. He joined the Navy, but later went to Wigan Technical College, followed by PhD studies at University College London. He became a Lecturer in Edinburgh (1954), and then in Manchester (1959), before returning to Edinburgh as Principal Scientific Officer at the Royal Observatory. In 1975, following the retirement of Hermann Brück, Reddish was appointed to the "Triple Crown" of Regius Professor of Astronomy, Astronomer Royal for Scotland, and Director of the Royal Observatory.

In 1978, Reddish announced his intention to resign from his position (although he remained in post until September 1980), then began a private life at Rannoch Station in Perthshire, undertaking controversial research on dowsing, as well as less controversial work on the design of Chinese Junk sails. He moved with his family to Livingston in 1998.

== Scientific Accomplishments ==
Reddish's personal research was in the fields of stellar clusters, and later in galaxy evolution . He wrote many research articles, and also three textbooks. However, his main accomplishments were in scientific leadership. During the 1960s and 1970s, he co-led the creation of "GALAXY", an automated plate measuring machine; led the development of the UK Schmidt Telescope in Australia, and spearheaded the early development of a radically new facility, a four metre class IR telescope in Hawaii (UKIRT).

== Dowsing ==
Reddish was convinced of the reality of dowsing, which was controversial at the time and still is. After his resignation in 1980, he could pursue his research in this area, leading eventually to a book and some technical papers.
