= Astronomer Royal for Scotland =

Former position at the Royal Observatory

- Reul-eòlaiche Rìoghail na h-Alba
- Flag of Scotland

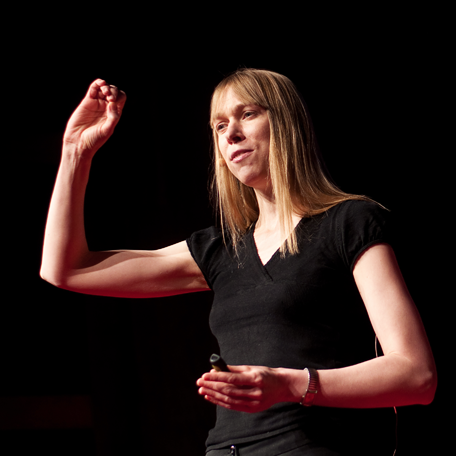
- Incumbent; Catherine Heymans FRSE since May 2021
- Royal Household
- Type: Independent public and ceremonial ambassador for astronomy in Scotland
- Status: Honorary title
- Member of: The Royal Household
- Appointer: The Monarch
- Term length: None; at the pleasure of the monarch
- Inaugural holder: Thomas Henderson
- Formation: 1834
- Website: Official website

Astronomer Royal for Scotland (Scottish Gaelic: Reul-eòlaiche Rìoghail na h-Alba) is an honorary title awarded to a distinguished astronomer in recognition of their contribution to astronomy in Scotland. The title was created in 1834 and was originally formally linked with the post of Regius Professor of Astronomy at the University of Edinburgh. It was also historically associated with the directorship of the Royal Observatory, Edinburgh.

Since 1995, the title has been an honorary office independent of the directorship of the Royal Observatory and the Regius Professorship of Astronomy. The current holder is Catherine Heymans, who was appointed in 2021 and is the first woman to hold the title.

== History ==
The title was established in 1834, against the background of a developing tradition of astronomical research in Edinburgh. The University of Edinburgh established its first Chair of Astronomy in 1786, while astronomical observations had been undertaken in the city since the 18th century. The Royal Observatory developed on Calton Hill and was designated the Royal Observatory during the visit of George IV to Scotland in 1822. The first Astronomer Royal for Scotland was Thomas Henderson, who was appointed by Royal Warrant on 18 August 1834. Henderson was also appointed Regius Professor of Astronomy at the University of Edinburgh and became closely associated with the Royal Observatory. His appointment established the long-standing connection between the title, the university professorship and the observatory.

Henderson was an important observational astronomer and is particularly associated with the measurement of stellar parallax. Observations made by Henderson of Alpha Centauri provided one of the earliest successful measurements of the distance to a star, contributing to the establishment of the scale of the stellar universe.

=== 19th century ===
Henderson was succeeded by Charles Piazzi Smyth, who became the second Astronomer Royal for Scotland. Smyth was a pioneer of high-altitude astronomical observation and conducted significant experiments on Tenerife, demonstrating the advantages of observing from elevated locations with clearer and more stable atmospheric conditions. His work anticipated the development of modern astronomical observatories at high-altitude sites. By the late 19th century, the Royal Observatory on Calton Hill had become increasingly unsuitable for modern astronomical research. Its buildings and instruments were considered inadequate, while financial difficulties threatened the future of the institution. The position was ultimately secured through the intervention of the 26th Earl of Crawford, who donated his extensive astronomical library and collection to the nation.

Following Crawford's benefaction, the government agreed to establish a new Royal Observatory on Blackford Hill in Edinburgh. Ralph Copeland, who became Astronomer Royal for Scotland in 1889, supervised the development of the new observatory. The Blackford Hill observatory opened in 1896 and incorporated a residence for the Astronomer Royal. The new observatory became an important centre for astronomical research, instrumentation and technological development. The Astronomer Royal for Scotland continued to have a direct institutional role in its activities, with successive holders combining the title with senior academic and observational responsibilities.

=== 20th century ===
During the 20th century, the office continued to be closely associated with the Royal Observatory, Edinburgh. The holders included Sir Frank Watson Dyson, Ralph Allen Sampson, William Michael Herbert Greaves, Hermann Brück, Vincent Reddish and Malcolm Longair. The Royal Observatory became increasingly involved in astronomical technology and large-scale international observing programmes during the latter part of the 20th century. Its work included involvement with major overseas facilities, including the UK Schmidt Telescope in Australia, the United Kingdom Infrared Telescope in Hawaii and the James Clerk Maxwell Telescope.

The institutional relationship between the title and the Royal Observatory changed during the 1990s. Between 1991 and 1995, the title was in abeyance while the roles of Director of the Royal Observatory, Regius Professor of Astronomy and Astronomer Royal for Scotland were separated. The traditional connection between the title and the Regius Professorship was formally severed, allowing the Astronomer Royal for Scotland to have an independent role rather than being tied to the University of Edinburgh or the Royal Observatory.

=== Modern honorary office ===
The title was revived in 1995 with the appointment of John Campbell Brown, then Professor of Astrophysics at the University of Glasgow. Brown held the office from 7 February 1995 until his death on 16 November 2019. Under the post-1995 arrangements, the Astronomer Royal for Scotland became an honorary title rather than an executive position. The holder is no longer responsible for directing the Royal Observatory, Edinburgh, and the title is not automatically connected to the Regius Professorship of Astronomy at the University of Edinburgh.

Following Brown's death, the title was vacant until 2021. In May of that year, Catherine Heymans, Professor of Astrophysics at the University of Edinburgh, was appointed Astronomer Royal for Scotland. Her appointment was recommended to Elizabeth II by an international panel convened by the Royal Society of Edinburgh. Heymans became the eleventh Astronomer Royal for Scotland and the first woman to hold the position since its creation in 1834. Her appointment represented a change in emphasis for the office, with public engagement and the promotion of astronomy forming an important part of her role.

== Role and responsibilities ==
The modern Astronomer Royal for Scotland is primarily a representative and honorary figure rather than an administrator of an astronomical institution. The role provides a prominent platform for promoting astronomy, scientific research and public understanding of science in Scotland. At the time of her appointment, Heymans stated that she intended to use the position to advance amateur and professional astronomy in Scotland and to promote Scotland internationally as a centre for scientific research. She also identified increasing opportunities for children and young people to engage directly with astronomy as an important objective. The modern office therefore differs substantially from its 19th- and early-20th-century form. Whereas the original holders were directly involved in the operation and scientific direction of the Royal Observatory, the title now provides an independent voice for astronomy in Scotland.

== List of Astronomers Royal for Scotland ==
No.	Image	Name	Start year	End year
1		Thomas Henderson	1834	1844
2		Charles Piazzi Smyth	1846	1888
3		Ralph Copeland	1889	1905
4		Sir Frank Watson Dyson	1905	1910
5		Ralph Allen Sampson	1910	1937
6		William Michael Herbert Greaves	1938	1955
7		Hermann Brück	1957	1975
8		Vincent Cartledge Reddish	1975	1980
9		Malcolm Longair	1980	1990
–		In abeyance	1991	1995
10		John Campbell Brown	1995	2019
–		None	2019	2021
11		Catherine Heymans	May 2021	Incumbent

== See also ==
- Astronomer Royal
- Royal Observatory, Edinburgh
- Regius Professor of Astronomy
- University of Edinburgh
- Astronomical Society of Edinburgh
