= Thomas Henderson (astronomer) =

Scottish astronomer and mathematician

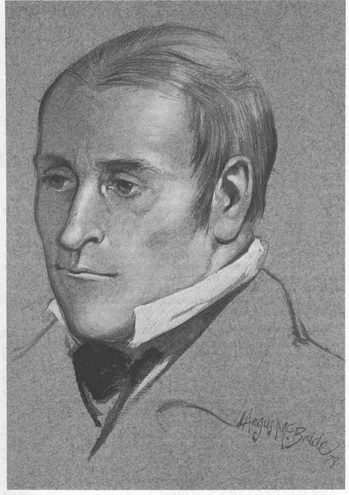
- Thomas Henderson, c.1820s Scottish Astronomer Royal
- Born: 28 December 1798; Dundee, Scotland
- Died: 23 November 1844 (aged 45); Edinburgh
- Known for: distance to Alpha Centauri
- Scientific career
- Fields: astronomy
- Workplaces: City Observatory, Edinburgh

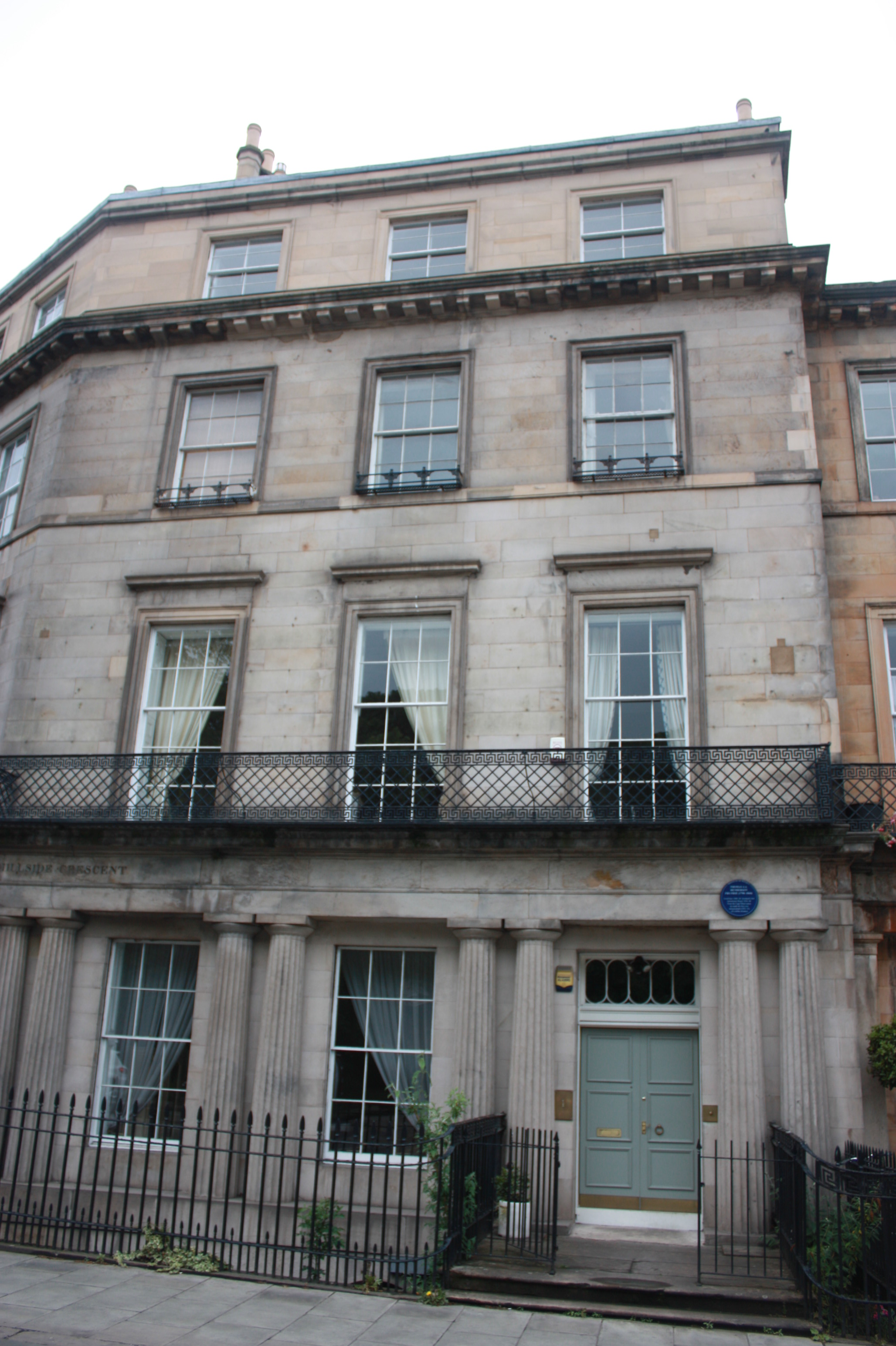
1 Hillside Crescent, Edinburgh

Thomas Henderson FRSE FRS FRAS (28 December 1798 – 23 November 1844) was a Scottish astronomer and mathematician noted for being the first person to measure the distance to Alpha Centauri, the major component of the nearest stellar system to Earth, the first to determine the parallax of a fixed star, and for being the first Astronomer Royal for Scotland.

== Early life ==
Born in Dundee, he was educated at the High School of Dundee, after which he trained as a lawyer, working his way up through the profession as an assistant to a variety of nobles. However, his major hobbies were astronomy and mathematics, and after coming up with a new method for using lunar occultation to measure longitude he came to the attention of Thomas Young, superintendent of the Royal Navy's "Nautical Almanac". Young helped the young Henderson enter the larger world of astronomical science, and on his death a posthumous letter recommended to the Admiralty that Henderson take his place.

== Career ==
=== Africa ===
Henderson was passed over for that position, but the recommendation was enough to get him a position at the Royal Observatory at the Cape of Good Hope in South Africa. There he made a considerable number of stellar observations between April 1832 and May 1833, including those for which he is remembered today. It was pointed out to him by Manuel John Johnson of the East India Company's observatory on Saint Helena that the bright southern star Alpha Centauri had a large proper motion, and Henderson concluded that it might be relatively close.

The 1830s version of the "space race" was to be the first person to measure the distance to a star using parallax, a task which is easier the closer the star. Henderson was thus in a good position to be this person. After retiring back to the United Kingdom due to bad health, he began analysing his measurements and eventually came to the conclusion that Alpha Centauri was just slightly less than one parsec away, 3.25 light years. This figure is reasonably accurate, being 25.6% too small.

Henderson did not immediately publish his results, however (there had been previous, discredited attempts to claim a measurement of stellar parallax), and eventually he was beaten to the punch by Friedrich Wilhelm Bessel, who published a parallax of 10.3 light years (9.6% too small) for 61 Cygni in 1838. Henderson published his results in 1839, but was relegated to second place because of his lack of confidence. He later published confirming observations by Thomas Maclear. Alpha Centauri remained the nearest known star until the discovery of Proxima Centauri in 1915 by Robert T. A. Innes.

=== Scotland ===
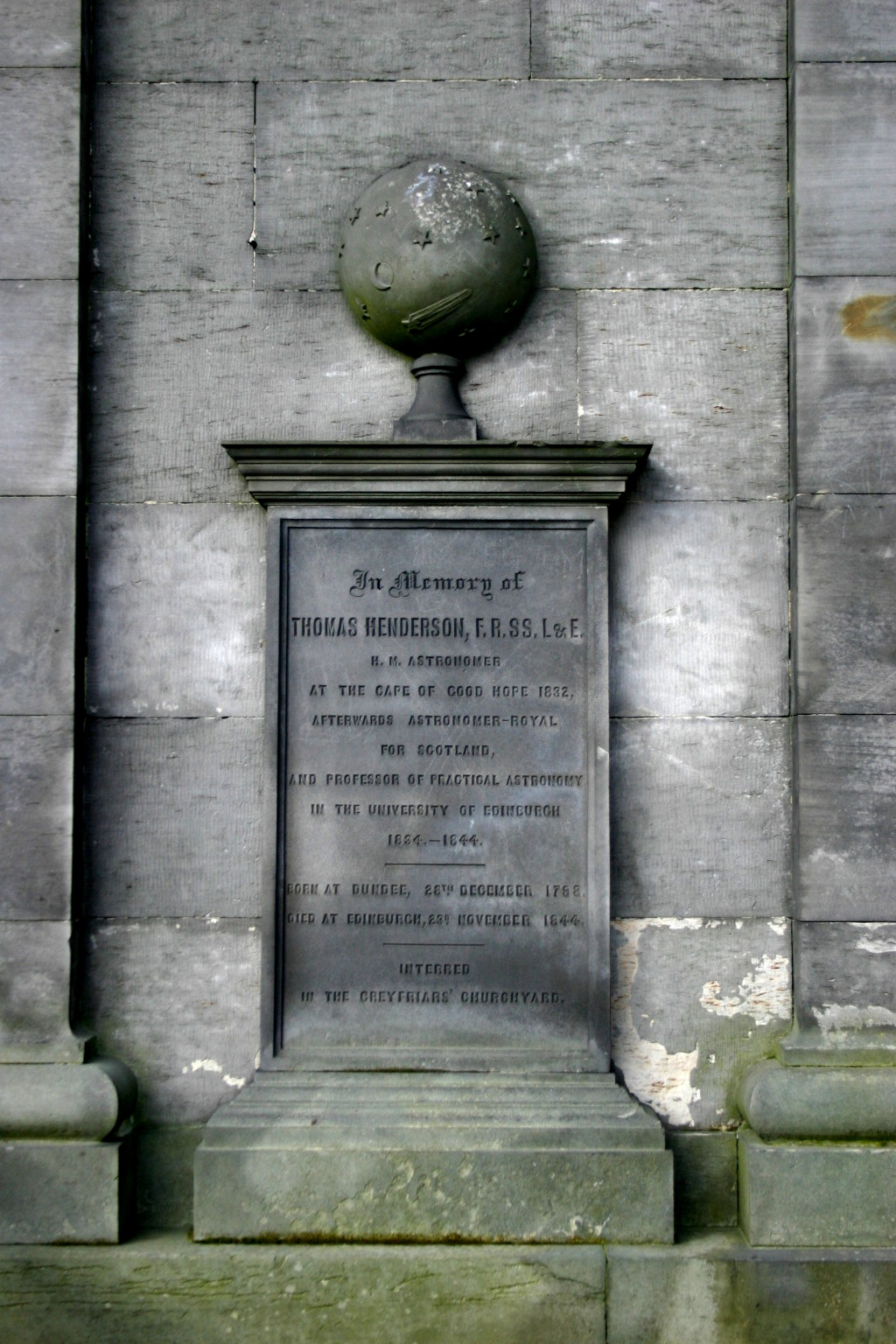
Memorial to Thomas Henderson at the observatory on Calton Hill

In the meantime, his measurement work at the Cape had led him to be appointed the first Astronomer Royal for Scotland in 1834. The vacant chair of astronomy at the University of Edinburgh was given to him on the advice of Prime Minister Lord Melbourne. From 1834 he worked at the City Observatory (then called the Calton Hill Observatory) in Edinburgh until his death. In April, 1840 he was elected a Fellow of the Royal Society.

Henderson became a member or fellow of several distinguished societies, including the Royal Astronomical Society (1832) and the Royal Society of Edinburgh (1834).

== Personal life and death ==
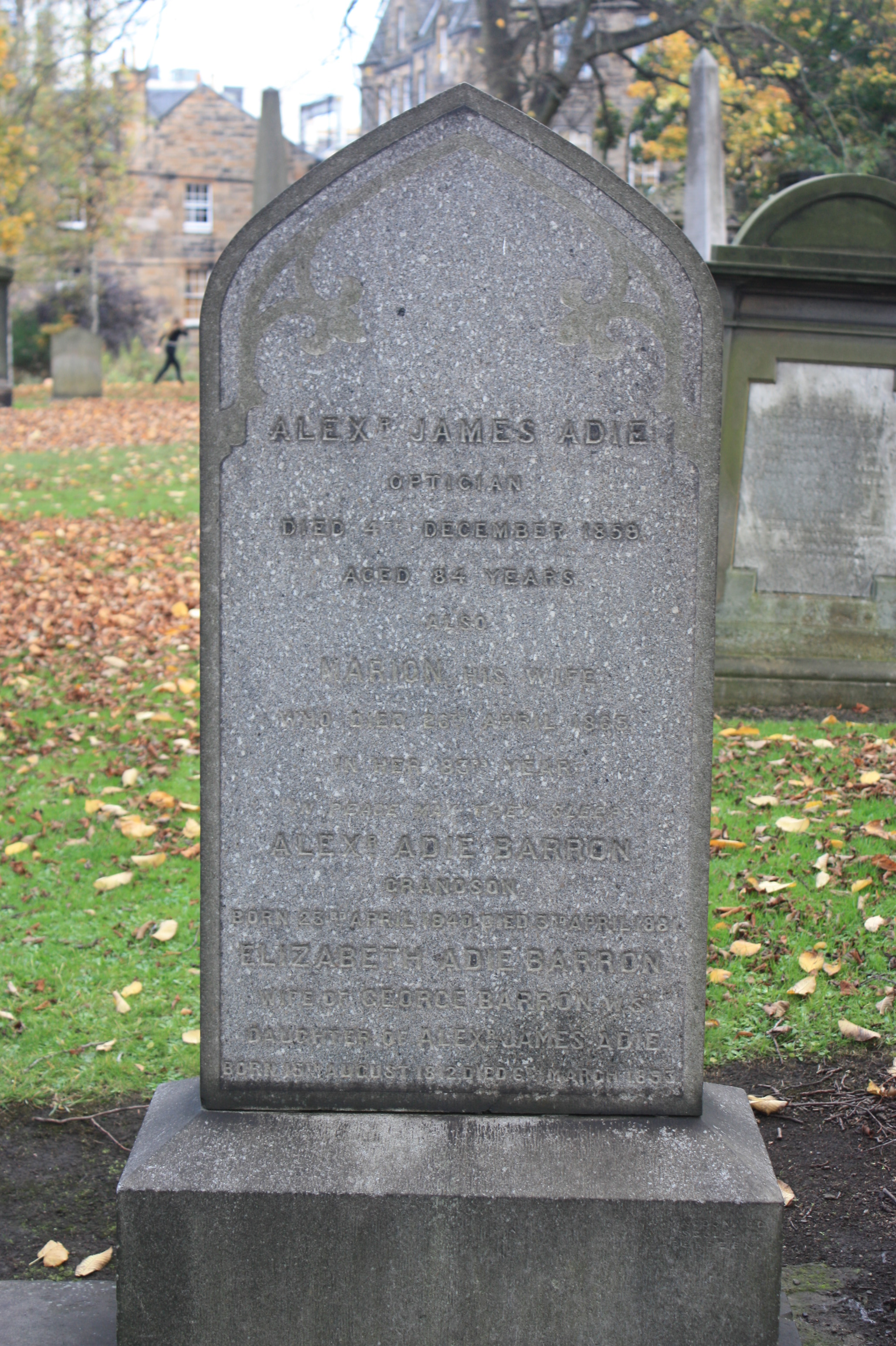
The grave of Alexander James Adie, Greyfriars Kirkyard

He married Alexander Adie's daughter Janet Mary Adie (1808–1842) in 1836 and had one daughter, Janet Mary Jane Henderson (1842–1893) who is buried in the Grange Cemetery.

He died at home 1 Hillside Crescent in Edinburgh on 23 November 1844 and is buried in Greyfriars Kirkyard. The grave may be either in the grave of Alexander Adie or in a grave marked by the stone "to his memory". His name is not recorded on the Adie grave; Adie himself died 14 years after Henderson.

== Recognition ==
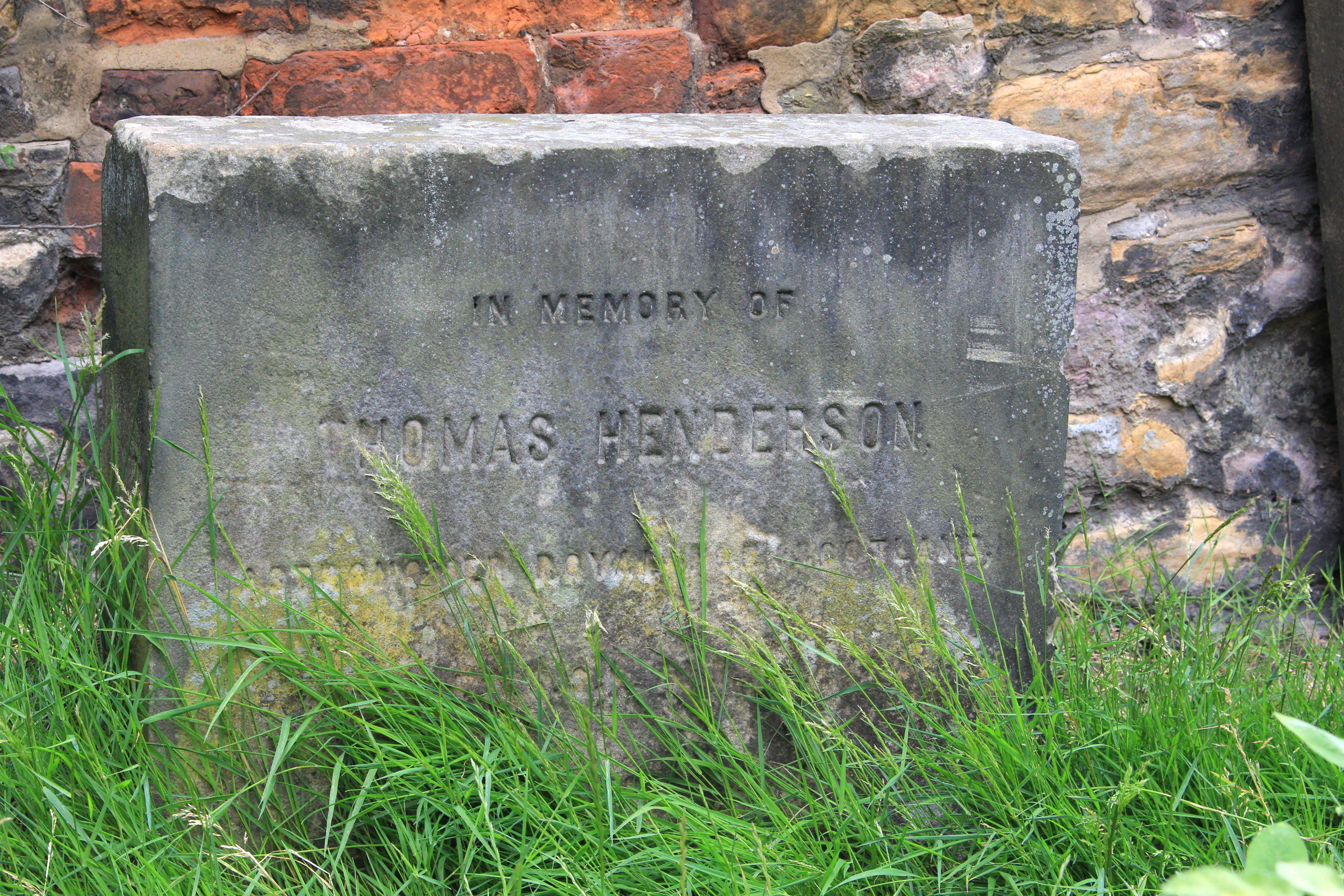
Memorial or gravestone for Thomas Henderson in Greyfriars Kirkyard

A blue plaque is installed on his house at 1 Hillside Crescent. It refers to him as "Thomas J. A. Henderson".

A larger memorial (naming him "Thomas Henderson") is incorporated in the external wall of the City Observatory.

Asteroid 3077 Henderson is named in his honour.

== Publications ==
- Henderson, Thomas (1842). "The Parallax of Alpha Centauri, deduced from Mr Maclear's observations at the Cape of Good Hope, in the years 1839 and 1840". Memoirs of the Royal Astronomical Society. 12: 329–372. Bibcode:1842MmRAS..12..329H.
- Henderson, Thomas (1840). "On the Parallax of Alpha Centauri". Memoirs of the Royal Astronomical Society. 11: 61–68. Bibcode:1840MmRAS..11...61H.
