= Ralph Allan Sampson =

British astronomer

- Born: 25 June 1866
- Died: 7 November 1939 (aged 73)
- Occupation: Astronomer

Ralph Allan (or Allen) Sampson FRS FRSE LLD (25 June 1866 – 7 November 1939) was a British astronomer.

== Life ==
Sampson was born in Schull, County Cork in Ireland, then part of the UK. He was the fourth of five children to James Sampson, a Cornish-born metallurgical chemist, and his wife, Sarah Anne Macdermott.

The family moved to Liverpool and Sampson attended the Liverpool Institute and then graduated from St. John's College, Cambridge in 1888. In 1891 he was awarded a scholarship to carry out astronomical research at Cambridge University. (He had been a student of astronomer John Couch Adams, and helped to edit and publish Part I of the second volume of Adams' papers in 1900).

In 1893, Sampson was made Professor of Mathematics at Durham College of Science in Newcastle-on-Tyne and was elected Professor of Mathematics at Durham University in 1895. In December 1910, he became Astronomer Royal for Scotland (until 1937) and Professor of Astronomy at the University of Edinburgh. He did pioneering work in measuring the color temperature of stars. He did important research into the theory of the motions of Jupiter's four Galilean satellites, for which he won the Gold Medal of the Royal Astronomical Society in 1928. He served as president of the Royal Astronomical Society from 1915 to 1917.

In June 1903, Sampson was elected a Fellow of the Royal Society. In 1911 he was elected a Fellow of the Royal Society of Edinburgh. His proposers were Sir Frank Watson Dyson, Sir James Walker, Arthur Robinson, and James Gordon MacGregor. He served as the Society's Vice President 1915 to 1918 and as Secretary 1922-23 and General Secretary 1923 to 1933. He won their Keith Prize for 1919–1920.

At the fifth International Congress of Mathematicians held in 1912 in Cambridge, Sampson presented a paper entitled Some points in the theory of errors.

He retired in 1937 aged 71 due to failing health, and subsequently moved to Bath.

He died, aged 73, in Bath, Somerset on 7 November 1939.

== Family ==
In 1893 he married Ida M. Binney (1868-1940) of the Prescott (Liverpool) area, south Lancashire. She died a year later than her husband in Poole, Dorset. His daughter, Peggie Sampson (1912-2004) was a professional cellist and educator. His brother John Sampson was a linguist and Romany scholar.

== Publications ==
- The Eclipses of Jupiter's Satellites (1909)
- 'The Sun (1914)
- On Gravitation and Relativity (1920)
- Theory of the Four Great Satellites of Jupiter (1921)

== Recognition ==
The crater Sampson on the Moon is named after him.
