= Fellowship of the Royal Society of Edinburgh =

Award granted by the Royal Society of Edinburgh

- Sponsored by: Royal Society of Edinburgh
- Location: Edinburgh
- Website: www.rse.org.uk/fellows/

Fellowship of the Royal Society of Edinburgh (FRSE) is an award granted to individuals that the Royal Society of Edinburgh, Scotland's national academy of science and letters, judged to be "eminently distinguished in their subject". This society received a royal charter in 1783, allowing for its expansion.

== Elections ==
Around 50 new fellows are elected each year in March. As of 2016 there are around 1,650 Fellows, including 71 Honorary Fellows and 76 Corresponding Fellows.

Fellows are entitled to use the post-nominal letters FRSE, Honorary Fellows HonFRSE, and Corresponding Fellows CorrFRSE.

== Disciplines ==
The Fellowship is split into four broad sectors, covering the full range of physical and life sciences, arts, humanities, social sciences, education, professions, industry, business and public life.

=== Life sciences ===
- A1: Biomedical and cognitive sciences
- A2: Clinical sciences
- A3: Organismal and environmental biology
- A4: Cell and molecular biology

=== Physical, engineering and informatic sciences ===
- B1: Physics and astronomy
- B2: Earth sciences and chemistry
- B3: Engineering
- B4: Informatics, mathematics and statistics

=== Arts, humanities and social sciences ===
- C1: Language, literature and history
- C2: Philosophy, theology and law
- C3: History, theory and practice of the creative and performing arts
- C4: Economics and social sciences

=== Business, public service and public engagement ===
- D1: Public engagement and understanding
- D2: Professional, educational and public sector leadership
- D3: Private sector leadership

== Notable fellows ==
Examples of current fellows include Jocelyn Bell Burnell. Previous fellows have included Melvin Calvin, Benjamin Franklin, Peter Higgs, James Clerk Maxwell, James Watt, Thomas Reid, and Andrew Lawrence.

A comprehensive biographical list of Fellows from 1783 to 2002 has been published by the Society.
