= John Mills (entrepreneur) =

Scottish entrepreneur and amateur astronomer

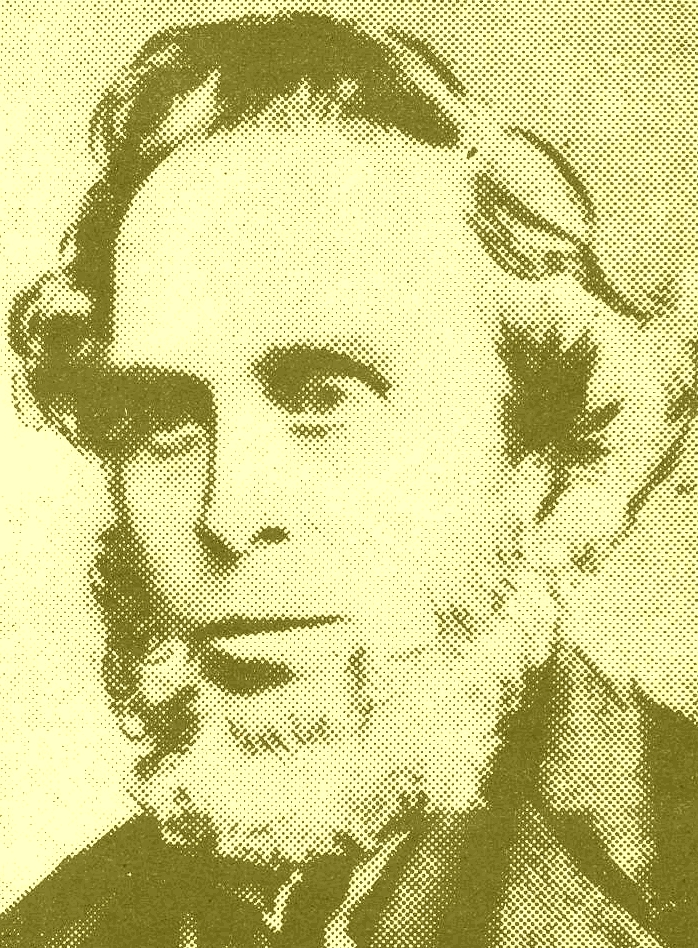
- Born: 1806; Dundee, Scotland
- Died: 1889 (age 83–84)
- Known for: Namesake of Mills Observatory
- Scientific career
- Fields: Astronomy

John Mills (1806–1889) was a Scottish entrepreneur, linen manufacturer, and amateur astronomer from Dundee.

Mills is best known for his contributions to Dundee's industrial growth during the 19th century and for his bequest which led to the creation of the Mills Observatory, the first purpose-built public observatory in the United Kingdom.

== Biography ==
=== Early life and career ===
Born in Dundee in 1806, Mills established himself as a successful manufacturer of linen and twine, key industries in Dundee's booming textile trade. His business activities reflected the industrial prosperity of the city during the Victorian era.

=== Interest in astronomy ===
Mills developed a lifelong passion for astronomy under the influence of the Reverend Thomas Dick (1774–1857), a philosopher, scientist, and author from Dundee who sought to harmonise science and religion. Dick believed that the greatness of God could best be appreciated through the study of the heavens and advocated that every city should have public parks, libraries, and observatories.

Inspired by Dick's writings and philosophy, Mills constructed his own private observatory on the slopes of Dundee Law, near what is now Adelaide Place. Contemporary prints show the ruins of the building without its dome, a reminder of Dundee's early astronomical heritage.

== Legacy ==
Although Mills's original observatory no longer exists, his enthusiasm for public engagement in science left a lasting mark on the city. His bequest later funded the construction of the Mills Observatory, which opened in 1935 on Balgay Hill. The observatory was built in his name and remains a public scientific institution dedicated to astronomy education and outreach.

One of Mills's telescopes is preserved and displayed at the Visitor Centre of the Royal Observatory, Edinburgh, offering a tangible link to his pioneering work as an amateur astronomer.

== See also ==
- Mills Observatory
