= Balgay =

Suburb of Dundee, Scotland

Balgay: Scottish Gaelic: Baile Gaoithe
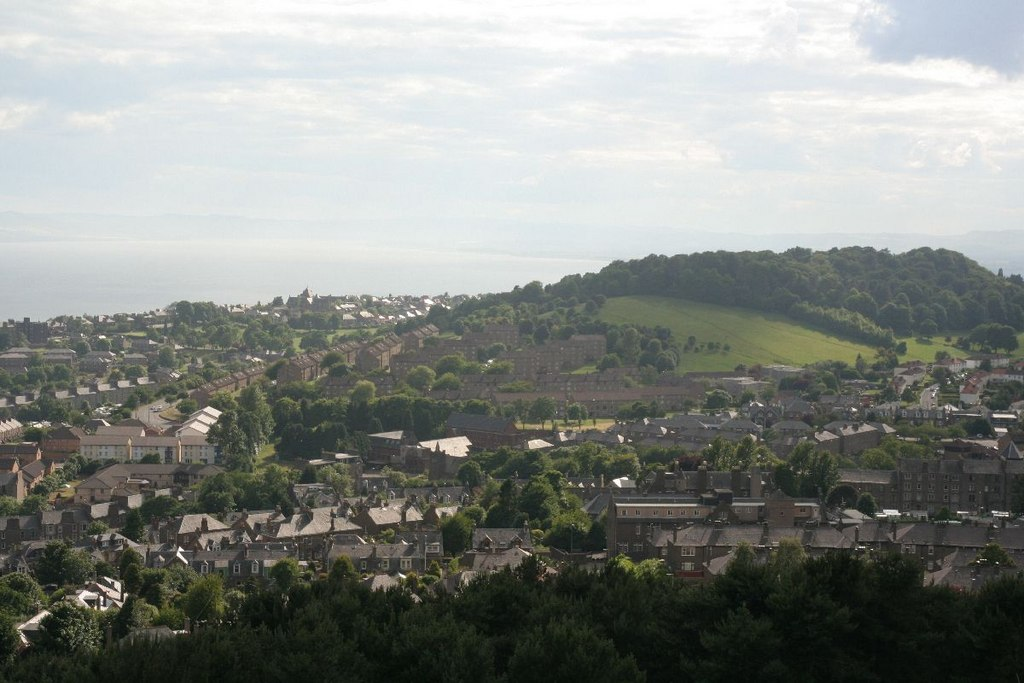
- Balgay and its hill from the Dundee Law.

- Location within Dundee City council area Location within Scotland
- Population: 3,439
- OS grid reference: NO374309
- Council area: Dundee City
- Lieutenancy area: Dundee
- Country: Scotland
- Sovereign state: United Kingdom
- Post town: DUNDEE
- Postcode district: DD2
- Dialling code: 01382
- Police: Scotland
- Fire: Scottish
- Ambulance: Scottish
- UK Parliament: Dundee West
- Scottish Parliament: Dundee City West

Balgay (Gaelic: Baile (na) Gaoithe) is a suburb in the west end of Dundee, Scotland. It is centred around Balgay Hill and Balgay Park, both of which provide extensive green spaces for recreation and nature appreciation. The area is characterised by its mix of residential housing, parkland, and its proximity to some of Dundee's historic landmarks, such as the Mills Observatory and Balgay Cemetery. The name, derived from Gaelic, seems to mean 'stead of the marsh/wind' .

== History ==
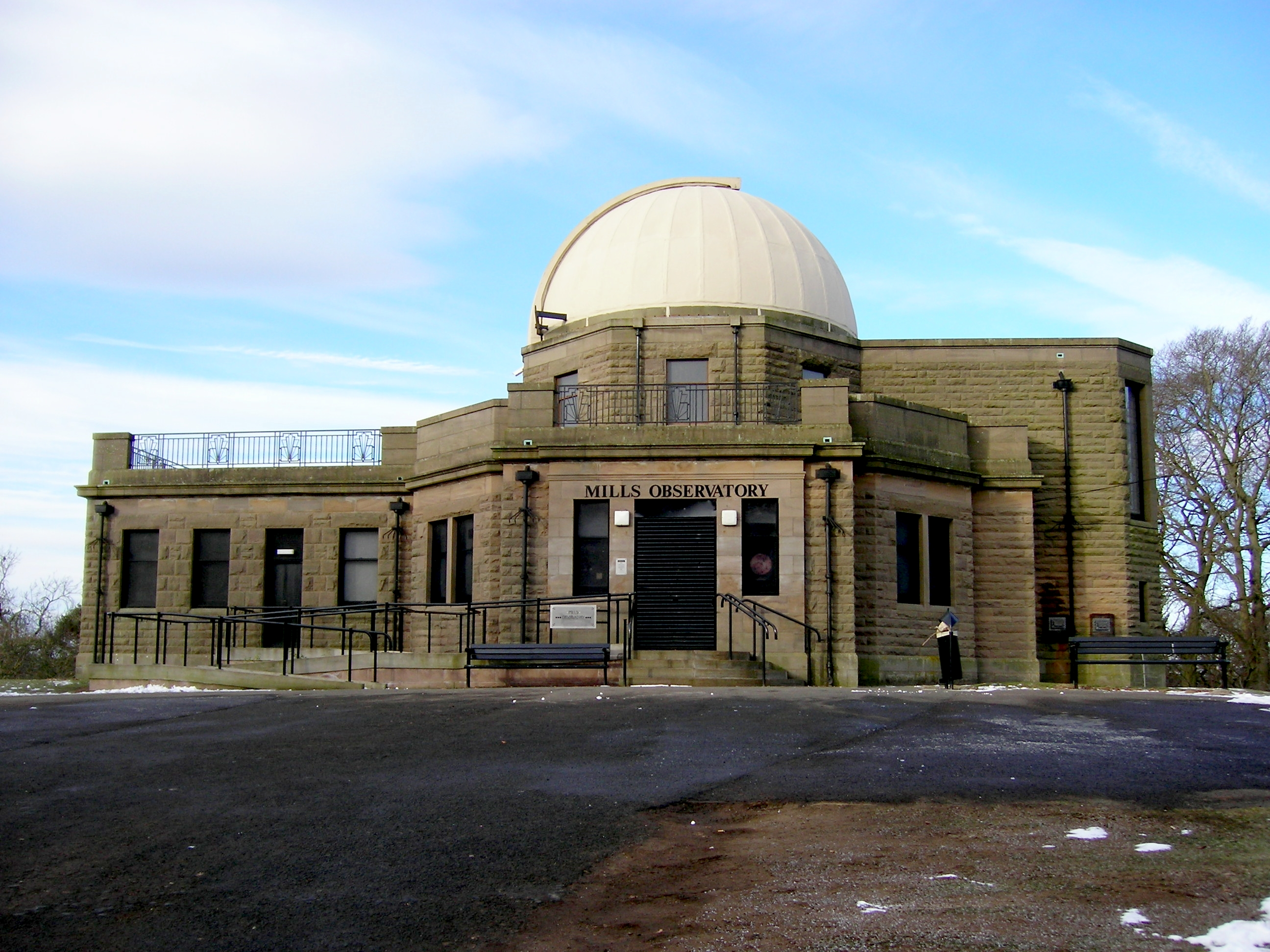
Mills Observatory, located on the summit of Balgay Hill

The area of Balgay has historical roots dating back to at least the 18th century. The original Balgay House was a laird’s residence, surrounded by formal gardens, orchards, and avenues. Balgay Hill, once part of the estate, was heavily wooded and provided scenic views of the River Tay. Over time, the estate lands were developed, with Balgay Hill becoming a key public space following the acquisition of the land by Dundee’s Police Commissioners in 1871.

The development of Balgay Cemetery and Balgay Park was instrumental in shaping the modern layout of the area. The cemetery, designed to follow the Parisian-style garden cemetery model, was established in the late 19th century, and the surrounding parkland became a significant recreational resource for Dundee’s residents.

Mills Observatory, located atop Balgay Hill, is the only full-time public observatory in the UK. Built in 1935, it attracts visitors for its astronomy programmes and telescope viewings. Nearby, Balgay Cemetery is a historic Victorian graveyard that includes several notable monuments and offers a quiet, reflective environment within the community.

Balgay today is primarily a residential area, with a variety of housing, including traditional tenements and newer developments. The neighbourhood is well-connected to Dundee’s city centre and is located close to other notable areas, such as Lochee and Perth Road.

The development of the Royal Victoria Hospital on the grounds of the former Balgay House estate in the late 19th century further shaped the area. The hospital, originally built as the Royal Victoria Hospital for Incurables, continues to serve the health needs of Dundee’s population and is a key institution within the area.

== Geography ==
Balgay is dominated by Balgay Hill, which provides panoramic views over Dundee, the River Tay, and beyond. The hill is an important natural landmark and is part of Balgay Park, a green space known for its woodlands, walking trails, and the Mills Observatory. The park is popular for outdoor activities and is home to diverse wildlife.

Lochee Park is situated east of Balgay and has a perimeter of 1½ miles (approx). The park previously hosted annual firework displays to celebrate Bonfire Night in conjunction with Radio Tay roadshow.

== Education ==
Primary schools in Balgay include Hillside Primary School and Ancrum Road Primary School. Menzieshill High School was also located nearby.

== Politics ==
Balgay is now part of the Lochee ward, and after the council elections on 3 May 2007, the Councillors are Nigel Don, Bob Duncan, (both Scottish National Party), John Letford and Tom Ferguson, (both Labour)

== Transport ==
Many bus routes in Dundee pass through Balgay including Xplore Dundee bus services 9, 10, 11, 12, 17, 22/22c and Stagecoach Strathtay services 72, 73 and 75. Services 17, 22/22c, 72, 73 and 75 usually terminates at the Ninewells Hospital terminus.

== Notes ==
56°27′53.67″N 3°0′45.26″W
