= Mills Observatory =

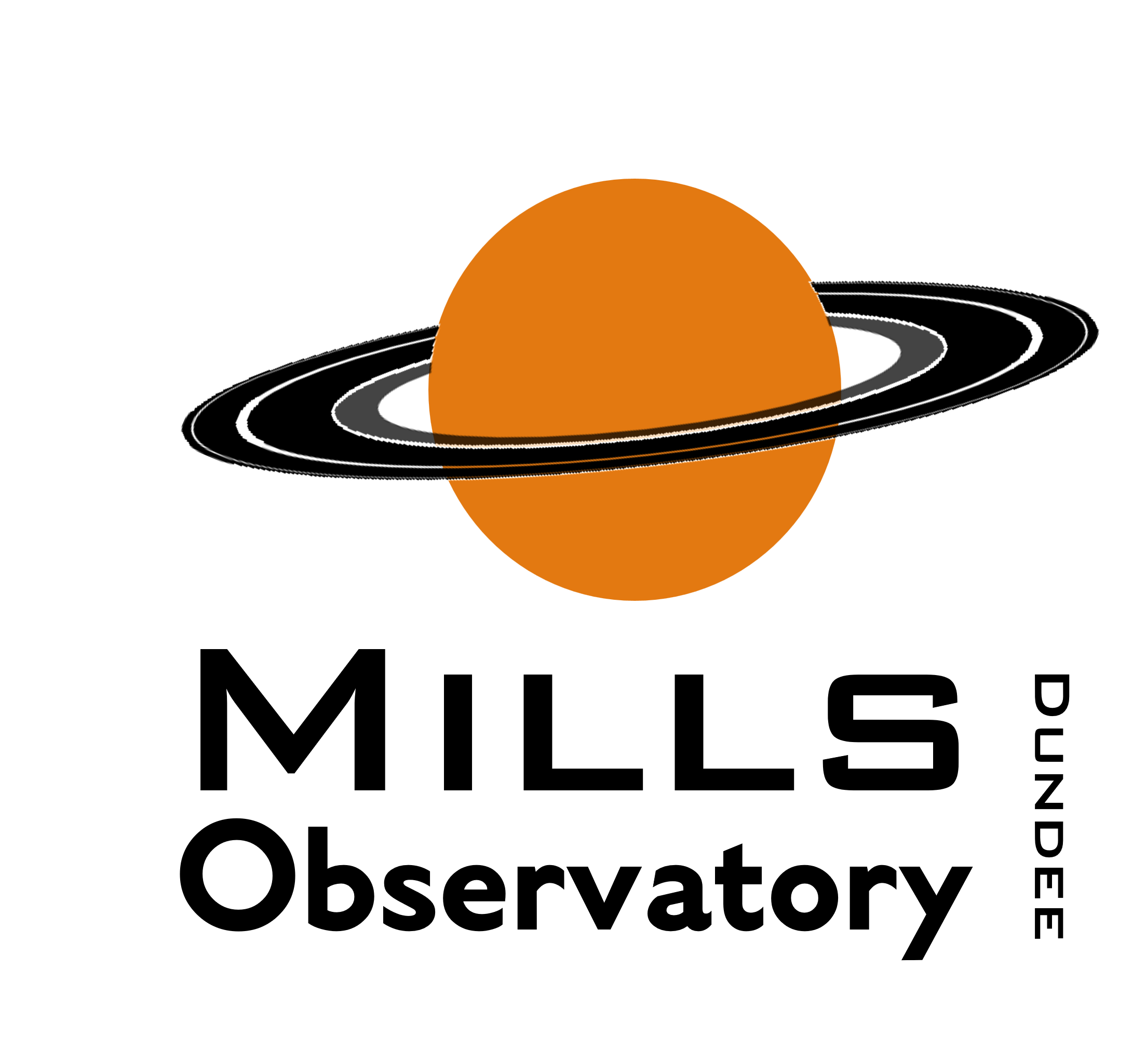

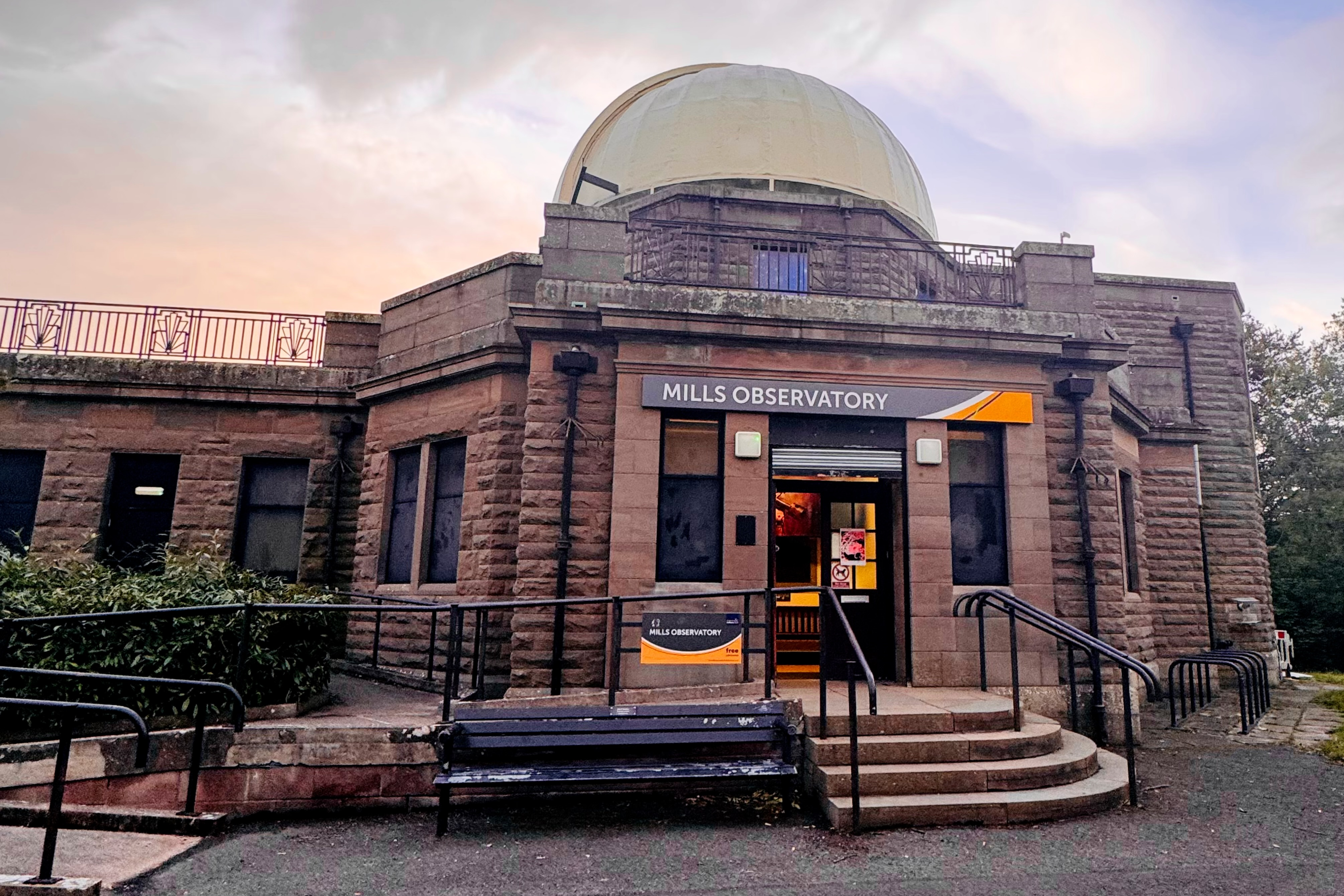
- Alternative names: Dundee, Balgay Park, Mills Observatory
- Named after: John Mills
- Location: Balgay Hill, Dundee, Scotland
- Coordinates: 56°27′53.93″N 3°00′45.27″W
- Established: October 28, 1935; 90 years ago
- Website: Official Mills Observatory Website
- Architect: James MacLellan Brown

Telescopes
- Telescope 1: 300 mm Schmidt-Cassegrain
- Telescope 2: 0.25 m (9.8 in) Cooke Refractor, focal length of 3.75 m
- Telescope 3: 250 mm refracting telescopes
- Telescope 4: Hydrogen-Alpha Solar Telescope
- New Addition: Webcam attached telescopes
- New 2013 Telescope: 400 mm (16 in) Dobsonian Reflector
- Related media on Commons

Mills Observatory is the first purpose-built public astronomical observatory in the UK, located on the summit of Balgay Hill in Dundee, Scotland. Built in 1935, the observatory is classically styled in sandstone and has a distinctive 7 m dome, which houses a Victorian refracting telescope, a small planetarium, and display areas. The dome is one of two made from papier-mâché to survive in the UK, the other being at the Godlee Observatory. The observatory is currently operated by Leisure & Culture Dundee.

== History ==
=== Initial plans ===
The history of the observatory starts with John Mills (1806–1889), a manufacturer of linen and twine in the city of Dundee, and a keen amateur astronomer. As a young man and a member of the Original Secession Kirk, he had been greatly influenced by the Reverend Thomas Dick, philosopher and author of a number of books on Astronomy and Christian Philosophy. Dr Dick attempted to harmonize science and religion, and believed that the greatness of God could best be appreciated by the study of astronomy, to which he devoted his life after a period as an ordained minister at Methven. He advocated that every city should have public parks, public libraries and a public observatory.

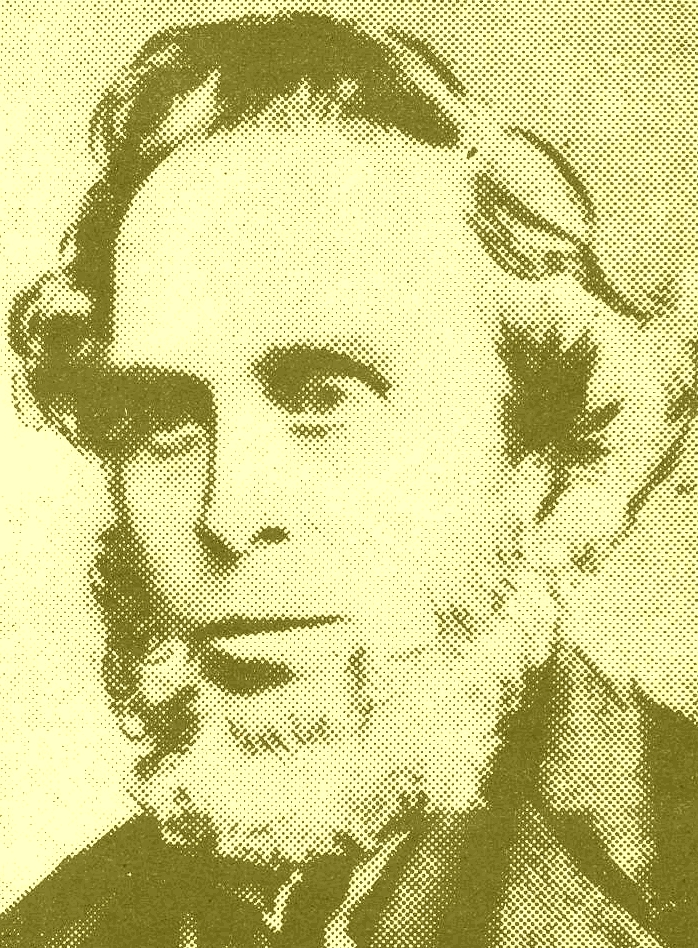
John Mills, who the observatory is named after

Mills built his own private observatory on the slopes of Dundee Law, near what is now Adelaide Place. An old print still exists showing the ruins of the building minus its dome. There would appear to have been, in addition to the main telescope, a transit room, and what was probably a study to record and write up his observations. The fact that he had a transit instrument signifies that he must have been doing timings of the passage of stars across the meridian, and was not just a casual observer. One of John Mills' telescope is on display in the Visitor Centre attached to the Royal Observatory, Edinburgh. It is a brass instrument manufactured by George Lowden, a Dundee instrument-maker of that period, who supplied Mills with a number of his instruments.

When Dundee Town Council received the bequest they were in something of a quandary. There was no precedent for any bequest of this nature, and their first thought was to offer the money to the University College, Dundee, in the hope that they would be able to fulfil its terms. They, in turn, sought expert opinion from, among others, the Royal Greenwich Observatory, regarding the feasibility of such a project. The advice they received envisaged that only very limited public access would be possible. Evidently the college decided that the project did not fit into their plans, so they declined the offer. A Trust was then set up with the Town Council, and plans were drawn up to build the Observatory on the summit of Dundee Law. However, the outbreak of the First World War in 1914 put the whole project in pause, and the site it was intended to occupy was instead reserved for the War Memorial, which was erected after the end of hostilities. No further progress was made during the 1920s.

The onset of the Depression in the 1930s caused the matter to be raised once again, since it was felt that the project would provide much-needed work for the depressed building industry. Professor Sampson, Astronomer Royal for Scotland, was brought in as consultant. After examining several sites including the Dundee Law, Stobsmuir, Reres Hill in Broughty Ferry and a site close to King's Cross Hospital, he came down strongly in favour of Balgay Hill as being by far the most suitable site, both in terms of astronomical suitability and for public access. This decision has stood the test of time, since other observatories have had their seeing conditions ruined by sodium lighting and other forms of modern pollution.

The concept of a public observatory is, in a way, a contradiction in terms, since by definition, an observatory should be as far away from the public as possible. Most of the modern research observatories are situated on mountain-tops or desert areas. However, the geography of Dundee is unique, in that it has Balgay Hill overlooking a river estuary, protected from the main lights of the city by trees which also help to provide a purer atmosphere, and at the same time very accessible to the public. Around 40% of all nights are observable from the observatory.

=== Planning, construction and opening ===
Professor Sampson collaborated with James MacLellan Brown, the City Architect, in designing a much more modern building than the one originally planned before the war. The structure is of sandstone blocks quarried from Leoch, near Rosemill. Initially planned to open in the summer of 1934 but pushed back to the autumn as a result of problems surrounding the adjustment of the dome, it was formally opened by Professor Sampson on 28 October 1935, and presented to the Town Council by Mr. Milne of the Mills Trust in the presence of Lord Provost Buist.

A message of congratulation was sent by the Astronomer Royal at Greenwich, Sir H. Spencer Jones. Articles on current celestial objects were written in the local press by the Reverend John Lees, who usually acted as chairman at public lectures given at the Observatory by visiting astronomers

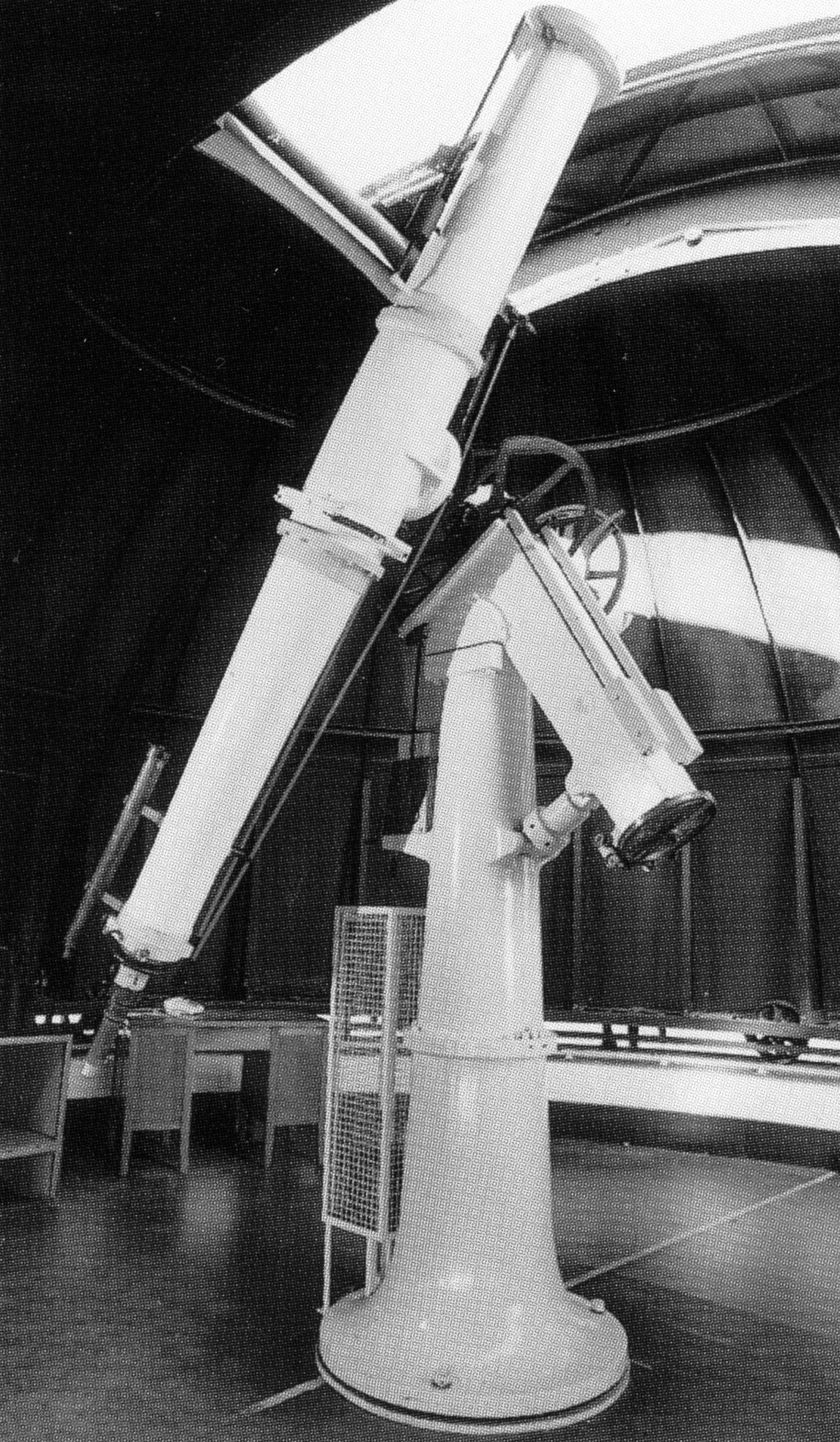
The 10-inch (250 mm) Cooke refractor telescope

The first Curator was J. Grant Bruce FRAS, an instrument-maker from Newport, Fife. This was a part-time post, with a small salary. A full-time caretaker, George Dorward, was also appointed. Hours of opening were fixed, with special arrangements for visiting parties, and for qualified persons at other times. In the winter evenings, Mondays, Wednesdays and Fridays were for the public, with Tuesdays and Thursdays reserved for private booked parties. During the day and throughout the summer, visitors could view the scenery from the balcony, using two four-inch (102 mm) Turret telescopes by Ross, suitable for terrestrial viewing. These were excellent telescopes, also very suitable for wide-field, low-power astronomical work. Unfortunately these are no longer functioning and only parts of one remain.

In the dome, the original telescope given by the Mills Trust was an 18-inch (46 cm). Newtonian reflector by Grubb Parsons, electrically driven.

The dome itself, also built by Grubb, is hand-operated and made of papier-mâché on a framework of steel. Grubb also built other notable observatory domes such as the Royal Observatory in Edinburgh and the David Dunlap Observatory’s dome, in Richmond Hill, near Toronto.

The only part of the dome which has had to be replaced over the years is the shutter, where the papier-mâché perished and marine plywood was substituted. The 18-inch telescope was rarely used at full aperture, due to its tendency to be affected by reflections from street lights caused by the open lattice-work tube.

One of the problems that restricted the astronomical work of the Observatory during this period was that Balgay Park was enclosed, and the gates were locked at dusk. Special arrangements had to be made with the Parks Department to have a gatekeeper on duty during the nights when the telescope was in use, and for him to supervise entry and exit of public and cars, and ensure no-one was left in the park after the observatory was locked up. This meant that all children had to be accompanied by an adult. For this reason the Council placed the Observatory under the administrative control of the Parks Superintendent, under whom it remained until reorganisation brought a transfer to the Museums Department. The railings were removed during the War, since when the park has had "open access." During the years 1935 to 1939 there was one staff change - Mr. Dorward retired and was succeeded by Mr. McDonald. Shortly after the outbreak of the Second World War the Observatory was closed for the duration and the staff re-deployed to work of more immediate national importance. After the war, when the Observatory re-opened, the 18-inch (460 mm) telescope underwent a radical transformation.

Professor E. Finlay Freundlich of St. Andrews University, together with his colleagues R. Waland, W. Threadgill and Curator Bruce, were planning the half-scale pilot model of the 37-inch (94 cm) Schmidt Cassegrain reflecting telescope now installed in the James Gregory building at St. Andrews. This was of a much more advanced design than the standard Schmidt telescopes then in use. The Americans were also working on a similar design and the St. Andrews team were keen to be the first to have it in operation.

The problem was that they did not have a suitable mounting available in St. Andrews for the 19-inch (48 cm) pilot model. They became interested in the Mills Observatory's Newtonian telescope as its mounting appeared ideally suited for their purpose. Permission was given by the Town Council for the Newtonian to be removed and the new instrument built in its place, on the assurance that: "this would give Dundee a much superior instrument for direct public observation as the pilot instrument would be left permanently mounted in Dundee and available for public use."

=== 1940s: Early years ===
During the next three years the telescope room was closed to the public while the work proceeded. Only the balcony was available and observations were carried out with small instruments. The telescope was completed in 1950 and described as "the first of its kind in the world." Unfortunately, it was purely for photographic work, which rather contradicted the above assurance. However, matters took a different course. The expansion of the city north and west and the development of sodium and mercury street-lighting hampered the work of stellar photography, so in February, 1951 Bruce and Professor Freundlich suggested that the pilot telescope be transferred to St. Andrews University Observatory, eleven miles (18 km) to the south, for better conditions and proximity to the workshops. Mills Observatory would then receive in exchange the 10-inch (25 cm) Cooke refracting telescope formerly used as a student training instrument and now surplus to requirements. At first the Town Council refused, and there was much correspondence in the local press, and indignation among local amateurs, that the university should interfere with the affairs of a public institution. Professor W.H.M. Greaves, had succeeded Professor Sampson as Astronomer Royal for Scotland, was called upon to advise on the matter. In view of the scientific benefits of the move, and lack of interest shown by University College, Dundee, he recommended that the transfer take place. This was done at the university's expense, and on the understanding that the two telescopes were on mutual loan.

The 10-inch (250 mm) refractor had to be modified slightly to fit the Mills dome, and the dew-cap cannot safely be used. However, it proved to be a much superior instrument for public viewing than the old Newtonian reflector. Originally built in 1871 it was, at one time, privately owned by Walter Goodacre, president of the British Astronomical Association (BAA), who lived in the village of Four Marks, near Winchester. The telescope was used there by many famous amateurs involved in the work of the BAA and was always described by them as "the excellent 10-inch Cooke refractor". It is particularly good for observing fine lunar and planetary detail and although not basically designed for photographic work, the lens is so good that, with modern cameras, good photographs can be taken. The Observatory has also acquired a number of smaller telescopes over the years.

=== 1950s: Císař years ===
Sometime after the Cooke telescope was installed, Curator Bruce died. In the autumn of 1952, the Observatory resumed its public functions under a new Curator, Jaroslav Císař DSc, FRAS, a research astronomer at St. Andrews.

Dr. Císař, from Czechoslovakia, soon aroused interest by his popular courses in astronomy at the adult education classes and encouraged young amateurs, including a number who became active in the Dundee Astronomical Society (DAS), which was formed a few years later. He and A.S. Dow, Superintendent of the Parks Department, allowed the Society the use of the lecture-room of the Observatory for meetings.

Dr. Císař, because of his St. Andrews commitments, could only devote a limited time to working at the Mills Observatory. In view of this, one of the keenest of the local amateurs, Harry Ford, a technician at Queen's College, became his assistant, and acted as Curator in Dr. Císař's absence. When eventually Dr. Císař retired he recommended that Mr. Ford be appointed as his successor.

=== 1967–1977: Ford years and Apollo moon landing viewings ===
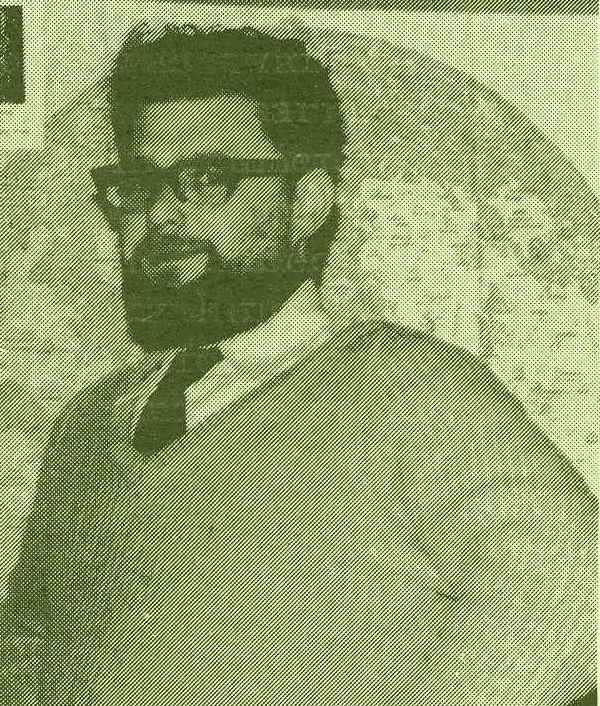
Harry Ford was the first full-time curator at Mills Observatory

This was agreed to by the Council so Ford took up his duties in 1967, first of all on a part-time basis, but eventually on a full-time contract. He was accordingly the first full-time Curator of the Mills Observatory in 1972. This meant that the Observatory could, for the first time, operate on a full-time basis. The DAS became involved in work of the Observatory with the stimulation and encouragement given by Ford, who had inaugurated a programme for the instruction of the public using visual aids and experimental techniques. He also built up interest by excellent public relations work, so that the Observatory attracted attention throughout the world of amateur astronomy. A number of exhibitions and "Open Days" were held at which the work of the local amateurs was exhibited.

Ford also organised displays of the work of the Observatory and the local Society at the BAA's Exhibition Meetings in London, which excited great interest among the assembled amateurs, and resulted in many of them making a special journey to Dundee during their holidays. Dr. Patrick Moore, well known TV and radio personality, praised the work of the Observatory as being "quite unique in his experience." He himself has visited the Observatory on a number of occasions. The period from 1971 to 1977 was a particularly fruitful one in the history of the Observatory. This was the period of the great upsurge of interest due to the space spectaculars of the USSR and United States, culminating in the Apollo missions to the Moon.

In July 1969, during the period of the Apollo 11 landing on the Moon, the Observatory witnessed the largest gathering of people in its history, at the time, when a colour TV was installed in the lecture-room giving full coverage of the mission, interspersed with talks, slide-shows, and an exhibition, stewarded by members of the DAS.

Another significant event which stimulated local press interest was the expedition by Ford, Morgan Findlay and Dave Taylor to observe the 1973 total solar eclipse off the coast of Mauretania, as part of the BAA organised cruise on the ship "Monte Umbe", covered for the BBC by Patrick Moore and shown on his "Sky at Night" programme on television. The photographs obtained as a result of this trip form an important part of the Observatory archives.

In 1971, a meeting of Scottish astronomical societies was held in the Observatory, and a civic reception given to the delegates from all parts of Scotland. This was to be the first of a series of important meetings hosted by the Observatory. Possibly the greatest highlight of this entire period was the "Out of London" meeting of the BAA held on 25 September 1975 at the University of Dundee, which was organised by Harry Ford and the DAS, followed by a public lecture at night given by Patrick Moore on the subject of Mars. This attracted such a wide interest that the hall was packed to overflowing and many had to be turned away.

The Lunar Section of the BAA met at the Mills Observatory on a number of occasions. At one such meeting in June 1972, Patrick Moore presented to the Observatory the original manuscript of Walter Goodacre's observations of the Moon made with the 10-inch (250 mm) refractor, when it was in his ownership, saying that it was only fitting that the manuscript should be where the telescope was. Harry Ford succeeded Patrick Moore as Director of the BAA Lunar Section in 1976, with Findlay and Taylor as co-ordinators. Most of the work was carried out by local members of the Section, with the co-operation of the Museums Department. However, in November 1977, due to pressure of work, Ford resigned his directorship.

During this period also the public work of the Observatory received a great boost, with many more visitors and parties of children and adults. Particular use of the facilities was made by school classes and youth groups. Ford extended the Observatory's displays by construction of many models including various space-crafts. He was also responsible for an important addition to the Observatory's facilities, namely the 12-seat planetarium or artificial sky, which he built himself from various oddments, and which proved a great attraction in its own right, particularly for the younger visitors, and for school parties. Although it has now been supplemented by a commercially-made planetarium which can accommodate larger parties, Ford's original planetarium is still used regularly for small groups of visitors.

Dick Kennedy, the 20-serving caretaker of the Observatory, who began after McDonald left in the 1950s and continued until his retirement in 1973. He was succeeded as caretaker by Jim Richardson, who retired the following year.

=== 1980–1990s: Flood years ===
From then on the post was combined with that of Assistant to the Curator, and Thomas Flood took over that position. In February 1982, due to domestic circumstances, Ford resigned from his post as Curator and moved south. During his period Thomas Flood served as the Curator, latterly re-designated as City Astronomer. Ford was succeeded in October of that year by the present City Astronomer, Dr. Fiona Vincent, a research astronomer from St. Andrews. Thomas Flood retired later that same year and Gary Hannan, A former member of the DAS, took over astronomer's Assistant in February 1983.

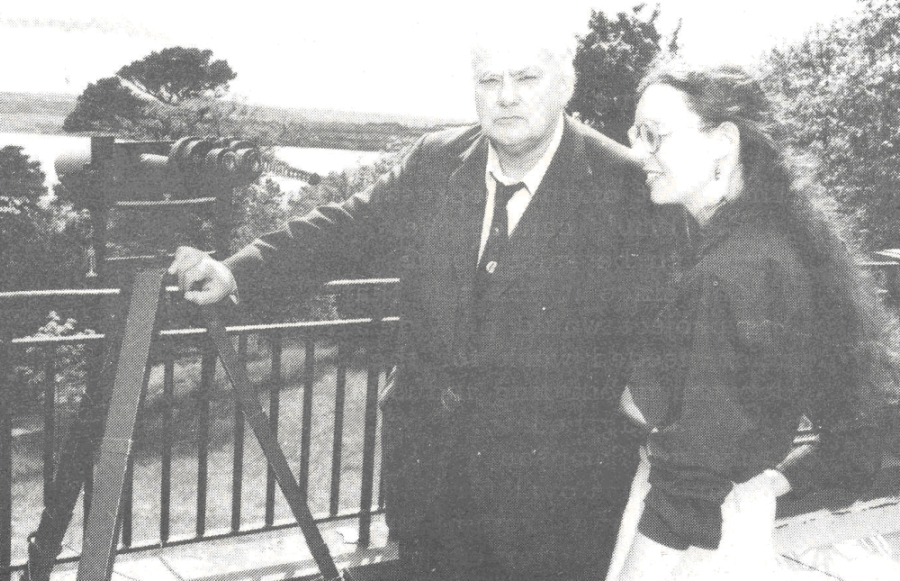
Dr. Patrick Moore and Fiona Vincent at the observatory

The 1982–1983 season was memorable in that the DAS Winter lectures included one by the current Director of the Royal Observatory, Edinburgh, and Astronomer Royal for Scotland, Malcolm Longair, a native of Dundee. Dr. Patrick Moore also paid another visit to the Observatory in connection with a highly successful meeting of Scottish societies affiliated to the BAA, hosted by the Dundee society - one of a continuing series of astronomical meetings held at the Observatory.

The following year saw the inauguration of great changes at the Observatory, the net result of which improved the structure and facilities in a marked way the installation of central heating, the re-surfacing of the balcony, the general redecoration of the whole building, and the upgrading of the lecture-room to an audio-visual theatre with carpeted flooring. This, together with the development of the display area and sales section, was made possible by a grant from the Scottish Tourist Board, and meant the greatest upheaval since the Observatory was built. Despite this the work of the Observatory continued uninterrupted and indeed it hosted a record number of booked parties and casual visitors, a tribute to the efforts of the Astronomer and her Assistant.

The social high point of 1984 for the Observatory occurred on June 21, with the official opening of the new improved facilities by Dr. Patrick Moore in the presence of the Lord Provost, civic dignitaries, the Curator of Museums, Adam Ritchie, members of the Museums staff and invited guests. In his speech Dr Moore predicted that in the future, as in the past, the Mills Observatory would play a great part in the furtherance of amateur astronomy in Britain, and inspire some to take up astronomy as a career.

While attending St. Andrews University, the astronomer Robert H. McNaught was a regular visitor to the Observatory and became a friend of Harry Ford. In 1990 he discovered two minor planets, 6906 Johnmills and 6907 Harry Ford, which he named after John Mills and Harry Ford.

The booklet The Mills Observatory -A Historical Survey by Thomas Flood was published in 1986, while Dr. Fiona Vincent was in charge. Dr. Vincent resigned in 1989 and was succeeded by her assistant, Brian Kelly. Kelly remained in post until 1999 when he resigned and the position was taken up by Jeff Lashley, who remained in charge of the observatory until November 2001.

In the 1990s, Mills Observatory continued its mission of public engagement by launching a regular series of “Open Nights,” designed to bring astronomy to a wider audience, the first of which, launched in September 1991.

Crowds gathered at the observatory to witness the August 1999 solar eclipse which had a visibility rate of 80% over Dundee.

=== 2000s: New additions and refurbishments ===
In May 2000, Mills Observatory was featured as one of top 100 observatories in Europe, ranking 65th, in a list by WhichMuseum.

Dr. Bill Samson took up the post of Heritage Officer (Mills Observatory) in February 2002 and became part-time Heritage Officer at the Mills in October 2004 and retired in March 2007. Ken Kennedy was employed to work on the winter evenings when Dr Samson was not in attendance at the observatory.

In 2003, the observatory was extensively refurbished with the support of the Heritage Lottery Fund. Disabled access and other facilities were added at that time. It was re-opened in February 2004 by HRH the Princess Royal.

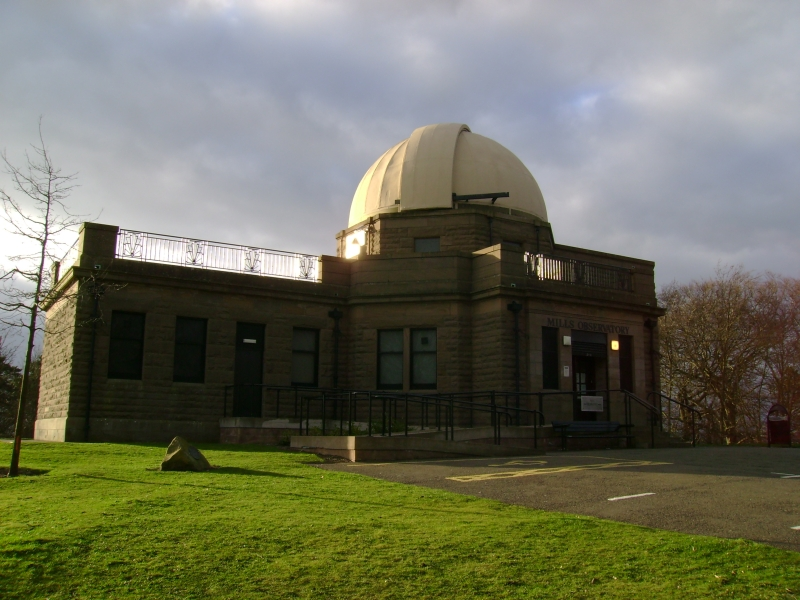
Mills Observatory in 2007

A 350-metre Planet Trail, in the form of standing stones with plaques to represent the planets, was opened by Professor John Brown, Astronomer Royal for Scotland, in June 2004, which extends from the East summit of Balgay Hill (the ‘Sun’) to the Mills Observatory (‘Pluto’). At the same time as the trail was constructed its surroundings were sympathetically landscaped and a new viewpoint established on the East summit.

In 2005, Apollo astronaut, David Scott, commander of Apollo 15 visited the observatory.

=== 2010s: Privatisation fears, dome faults and 80th anniversary celebrations ===
In 2010, the city council revealed proposals to privatise the observatory which was met with backlash with fears that it could close or prompt the observatory to charge for entry. This was ultimately reversed.

In 2011, repairs were made to the telescope and Mills Observatory was a host venue for the NEoN Digital Arts Festival in 2011 where the planetarium was used to display the sound of the stars.

Mills Observatory marked its 80th anniversary celebrations in 2015. The observatory saw an increase in visitors as a result of the March 2015 solar eclipse where Dundee had a 95% totality rate. As part of the 80th anniversary celebrations, a new exhibition, "Outer Space/Inner Space" opened in partnership with the University of Dundee.

In early 2018, Mills Observatory faced a significant setback when the shutter mechanism on its distinctive papier-mâché dome failed, rendering its main telescopes unusable. The dome's closure meant the public could no longer access the observatory's two primary telescopes, relying instead on smaller instruments set up on the balcony and car park. As a result, Leisure and Culture Dundee announced a reduced programme of events, warning there was little chance the dome would be operational by the key autumn and winter stargazing months. Repairs were complicated by the dome’s unique construction which required a specialist contractor, with assistance from Historic Environment Scotland. The repair costs were estimated at over £100,000.

Progress resumed in 2019, with repair work commencing in August. After almost 18 months out of action, the observatory was expected to reopen in mid-October, following a 10-week restoration project. The long-awaited repairs were aimed at restoring full functionality to the dome and allowing public access to the main telescopes once again.

=== 2020s: Closure threat, resurgence in visitors and 90th anniversary celebrations ===
Mills Observatory was closed for the 2020-21 season as a result of the COVID-19 pandemic but reopened for the 2021-22 season which saw 4,870 visitors visit.

In 2022, Mills Observatory was featured as one of the ten best astronomic observatories in the UK by the BBC Sky at Night magazine, ranking first.

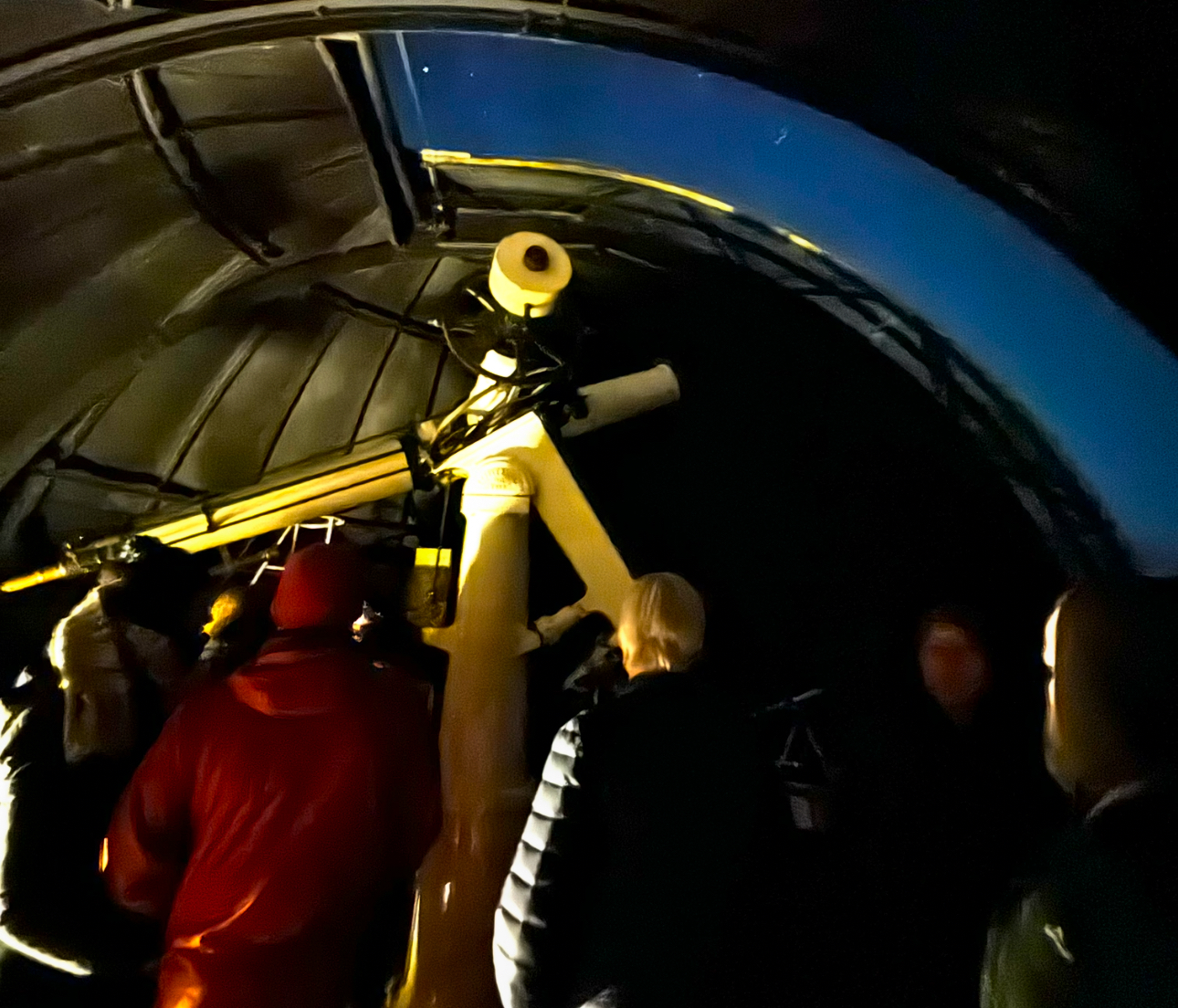

The 2024–25 season saw a resurgence in visitors to the observatory, becoming the most successful on record. This resurgence prompted the observatory to be saved from closure.

In February 2024, there were plans for the observatory to close as a result of budget cuts proposed by Dundee City Council alongside Broughty Castle and the Caird Park golf course. The proposal was met with much criticism and was overturned later in the month after funding was given to Leisure and Culture Dundee to continue operating the observatory.

Closure was threatened once more in May 2024 when a public consultation opened for the future of Mills Observatory, and the other two venues. In response, a petition was created which led to over 3,000 signatures, and in June 2024, STAR-Dundee, a space technology company based in Dundee, committed £50,000 to the observatory which will be distributed over the course of five years. At the end of the 2023–24 season, the observatory was visited by 6,654 people, down from 7,424 at the end of the 2022–23 season.

Following the start of the 2024–25 season in October 2024, the observatory recorded a notable resurgence in visitor numbers, attributed in part to increased public attention through social media after a partnership was established with Dundee Culture, which drew nearly 4,000 visitors in the first month.

In November 2024, it was revealed that officers from Dundee City Council recommended that Mills Observatory should remain open, citing a 127% increase in visitor numbers and significant interest in the observatory, whilst the Caird Park golf course and Broughty Castle were planned to close in April and October 2025 respectively.

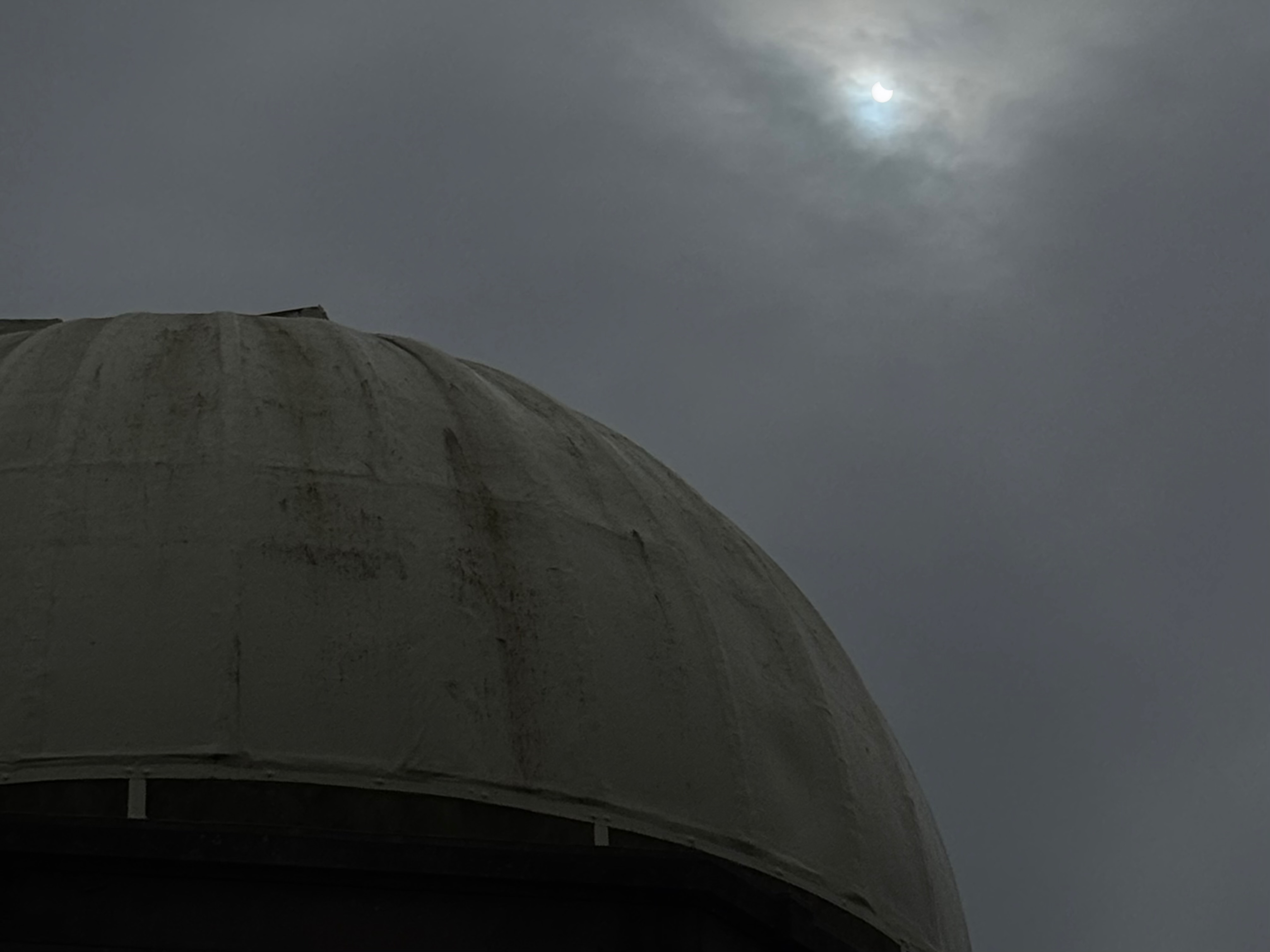
The March 29, 2025 partial solar eclipse visible over the dome at the observatory.

The final vote held on 2 December 2024 resulted in Mills Observatory being saved from closure as a result of the increase in visitor numbers and extra funding which would be distributed up to 2029 whilst the council voted to close Caird Park golf course as Leisure and Culture Dundee committed to assisting Broughty Castle’s immediate future with help from the Broughty Ferry Trader Association.

In 2025, Mills Observatory marked the start of their 90th anniversary with events held at the observatory for the January–February 2025 planetary alignment and the March 2025 solar eclipse, which was 40% visible in Dundee.

In February 2025, a lunar manuscript, The Moon – With a Description of its Surface Formations, which was donated to the observatory by Sir Patrick Moore in 1972, was put on display for the first time. The planetary alignment which took place on 28 February saw queues being formed at the observatory, with over 1,000 visitors reportedly having visited that evening.

In March 2025, it was announced that the observatory would be a venue host for the inaugural Dundee Book Festival, alongside Marryat Hall and the Central Library. On 26 March 2025, Leisure and Culture Dundee stated that the 2024–25 season was “its most successful ever” with over 14,000 visitors recorded since the season’s start in October. The final event for the 2024–25 season was the partial solar eclipse on 29 March 2025 which saw hundreds visit the observatory before closing until the 90th anniversary season.

In June 2025, Mills Observatory received a new round of funding aimed at enhancing its visitor experience and securing its long-term future. Culture & Business Scotland awarded £5,000 to support the redevelopment of the first floor of the observatory. The investment is set to fund new interactive features including space-themed games, craft activities, and a “Story of Space” wall, which highlights Scotland’s growing role in the global space sector and Dundee’s contribution to it. In July 2025, the observatory was featured in the space publication, Orbital Today, which looked at its resurgence in popularity and the forthcoming 90th anniversary season.

In August 2025, Mills Observatory renewed their partnership with Dundee Culture for the 90th anniversary season due to the positive impact it made on the 2024–25 season. As a result of the successful marketing campaign from that season, the observatory was named as a finalist in The Courier Business Awards in the Brand Marketing and Social Media category, the observatory’s first traditional award nomination. In September 2025, Mills Observatory announced that, for the first time in its history, visitors would be required to book tickets to access the dome. The change was introduced to improve the overall visitor experience and manage capacity, allowing more people the opportunity to stargaze. The decision followed a pre-season “Summer Stars” event which attracted large crowds and resulted in long queues outside the observatory.

In October 2025, Mills Observatory was recognised in both the Scottish Parliament and UK Parliament through motions lodged by Scottish Labour MSP Michael Marra and SNP MP Chris Law, respectively. The motions marked the observatory’s 90th anniversary and commended its contribution to education, tourism, and public engagement with astronomy. It highlighted the observatory’s record-breaking 2024 season, and noted its status as the UK’s first purpose-built public observatory.

The 90th anniversary celebrations included an event at the Steps Theatre hosted by Astronomer Royal for Scotland, Catherine Heymans and a gathering at the observatory that featured the Lord Provost Bill Campbell and Heymans in attendance.

In November 2025, Mills Observatory and the Royal Observatory Greenwich, which was marking its 350th anniversary, came together to celebrate their shared milestones. Commemorative cards were exchanged on the Prime Meridian line at Greenwich, and the meeting highlighted the long-standing connection between the two institutions.

In December 2025, BBC Sky at Night magazine published a feature on Mills Observatory that examined its resurgence during the 2020s. The article noted the role of public engagement and online outreach in raising the observatory’s profile, and referred to its increased use for educational and cultural activities, situating these developments within wider pressures facing publicly funded cultural venues in the UK.

Ahead of the 2026-27 season, Mills Observatory opened for a special one-off science event inspired by Dundonian Williamina Fleming. Later that summer, it was announced that a public viewing event hosted by the observatory for the August 2026 solar eclipse would take place at Broughty Castle instead of Mills Observatory, owing to the low position of the Sun during the eclipse.

In September 2026, the Scottish Album of the Year Award filmed a series of music sessions at Mills Observatory ahead of the Dundee's hosting of the 2026 event.

== Features ==
=== Telescopes ===
The main telescope is a 400 mm (16 in) Dobsonian reflector that was acquired in 2013. The observatory also houses a Victorian 0.25 m (9.8 in) Cooke refractor, with a focal length of 3.75 m. It was made in York in 1871 by Thomas Cooke and the optical components are of the highest quality. The telescope is actually older than the building. The dome also houses a 0.3 m (12 in) Schmidt-Cassegrain telescope, which was purchased in 2006. When the Mills Observatory opened on 28 October 1935, it originally housed a 450 mm (18 in) reflecting telescope, constructed by the Newcastle based company of Grubb Parsons. The dome itself is made of papier-mâché with a steel frame, and was also supplied by Grubb Parsons. Refracting telescopes have long been regarded as the superior instrument for planetary observing. During the winter evening hours, given clear sky conditions, the telescope is used to show the public the night sky.

=== Planet Trail ===
On Balgay Hill, an outdoor planet trail, scale model of the Solar System, is arranged to entertain and educate the exploring visitor. The planet trail is a series of standing stones and plaques representing the Solar System. The visitor starts with the Sun on the eastern summit of the Hill, and following the trail to the west from the Sun, in the direction of Mills Observatory, he or she will encounter another eight rocks representing the planets Mercury, Venus, Earth, Mars, Jupiter, Saturn, Uranus and Neptune. Pluto is represented by the pier in the Mills Observatory, which supports the telescope there.

=== Display Area ===
The display area is split into two parts. The main area in the centre of the building at ground floor level provides changing displays of pictures and models, and also houses the observatory shop. The upper level provides displays of historic equipment and information of local importance.

== Facilities ==
Mills Observatory is managed by Leisure & Culture Dundee. Up until the 2000s, the observatory welcomed over 10,000 visitors annually, taking advantage of its unique facilities and public engagement programmes.

Admission remains free, with interactive displays and exhibitions available to explore. A small fee applies for public planetarium shows, and the dome was ticketed for the first time from the 2025–26 season.

=== Group visits ===
Groups are welcome to visit during opening hours, with the option to book a special session that includes a planetarium show and telescope viewing (weather permitting). A small fee applies for group visits.

=== Lecture Room ===
The observatory's lecture room can accommodate up to 25 people and is equipped for a range of media presentations, including slides, transparencies, and video content.

=== Observatory Shop ===
The observatory shop offers a selection of telescopes, souvenirs, and minerals. Visitors can also purchase Skywatcher telescopes, including the 114 mm reflector and 60 mm refractor models.

== Visitor numbers ==
Mills Observatory continues to attract thousands of visitors each year, offering a mix of educational programmes, stargazing sessions, and public events. While visitor numbers have fluctuated over time, ongoing investment in outreach and digital engagement ensures it remains a key destination for astronomy enthusiasts in Dundee.

Following the threat of closure, the subsequent 2024–25 season became the most successful season on record, having prompted a resurgence in visitors, with 14,703 visits recorded.

Mills Observatory visitor numbers
Season	Visitor numbers	Ref
2003–04	8,850	
2004–05	▲12,762	
2011–12	10,995	
2012–13	▼8,806	
2014–15	▼6,647	
2015–16	▲8,329	
2016–17	▲11,162	
2017–18	▼9,149	
2018–19	▼6,100	
2019–20	▼5,601	
2020–21	Closed	
2021–22	▼4,870	
2022–23	▲7,424	
2023–24	▼6,654	
2024–25	▲14,703	
2025–26	TBA	

== In popular culture and other depictions ==
In the video game The Baby in Yellow, released by Team Terrible, the Doctor's Lab is based on the observatory. The observatory’s Cooke refractor telescope was featured in the Scottish Qualifications Authority National 5 Physics examination paper in 2014.

Mills Observatory features on the Gold Club jerseys for the Dundee Stars ice hockey team, alongside the Tay Bridge.

== Image gallery ==
=== 2000s ===
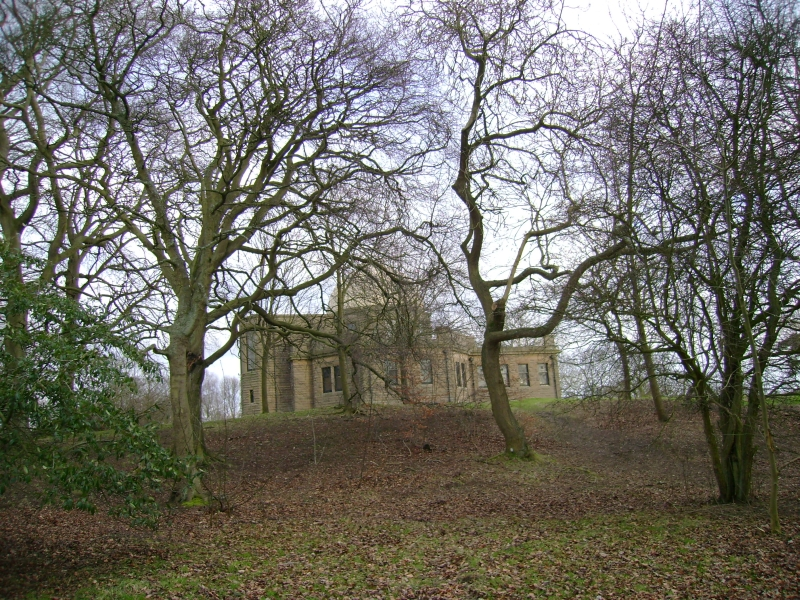
Observatory in Balgay Hill

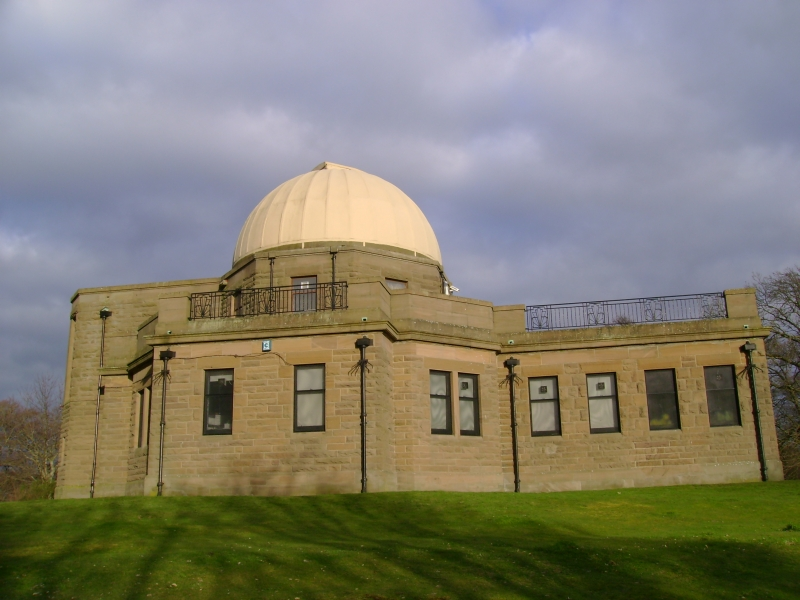
Mills Observatory

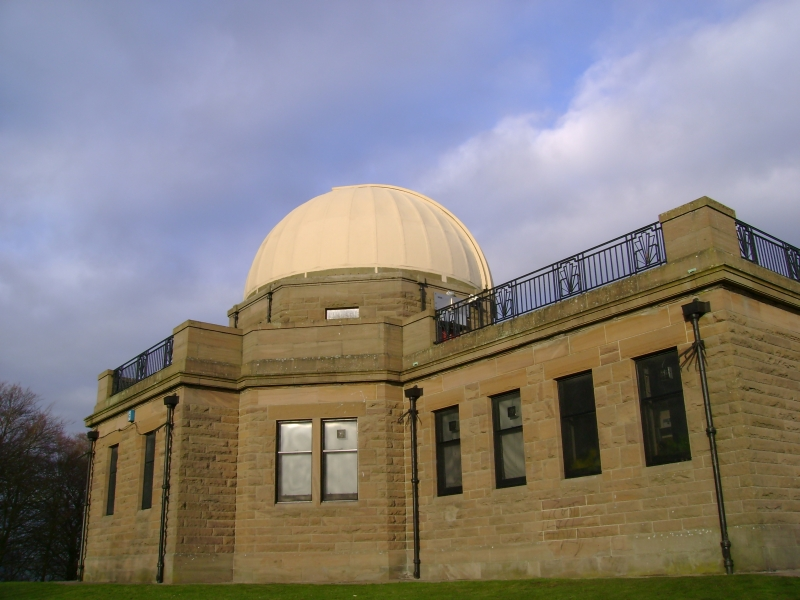
Mills Observatory

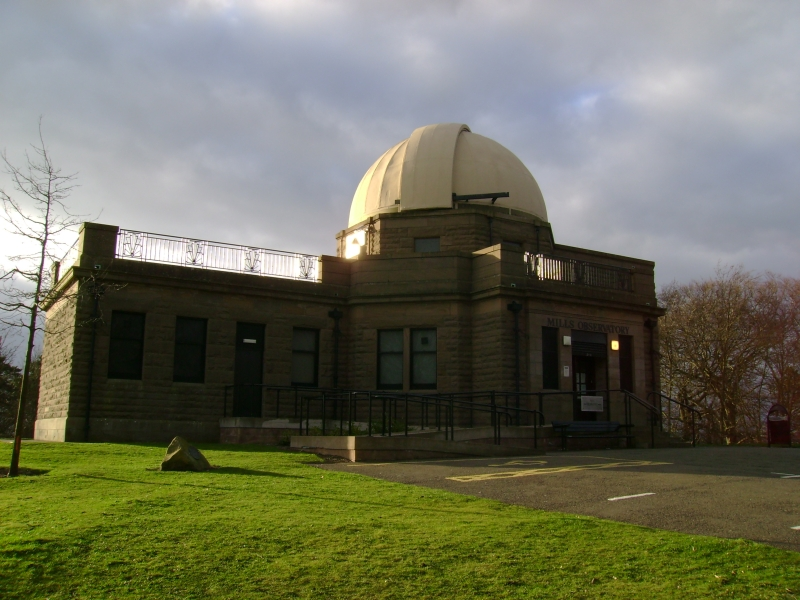
Mills Observatory

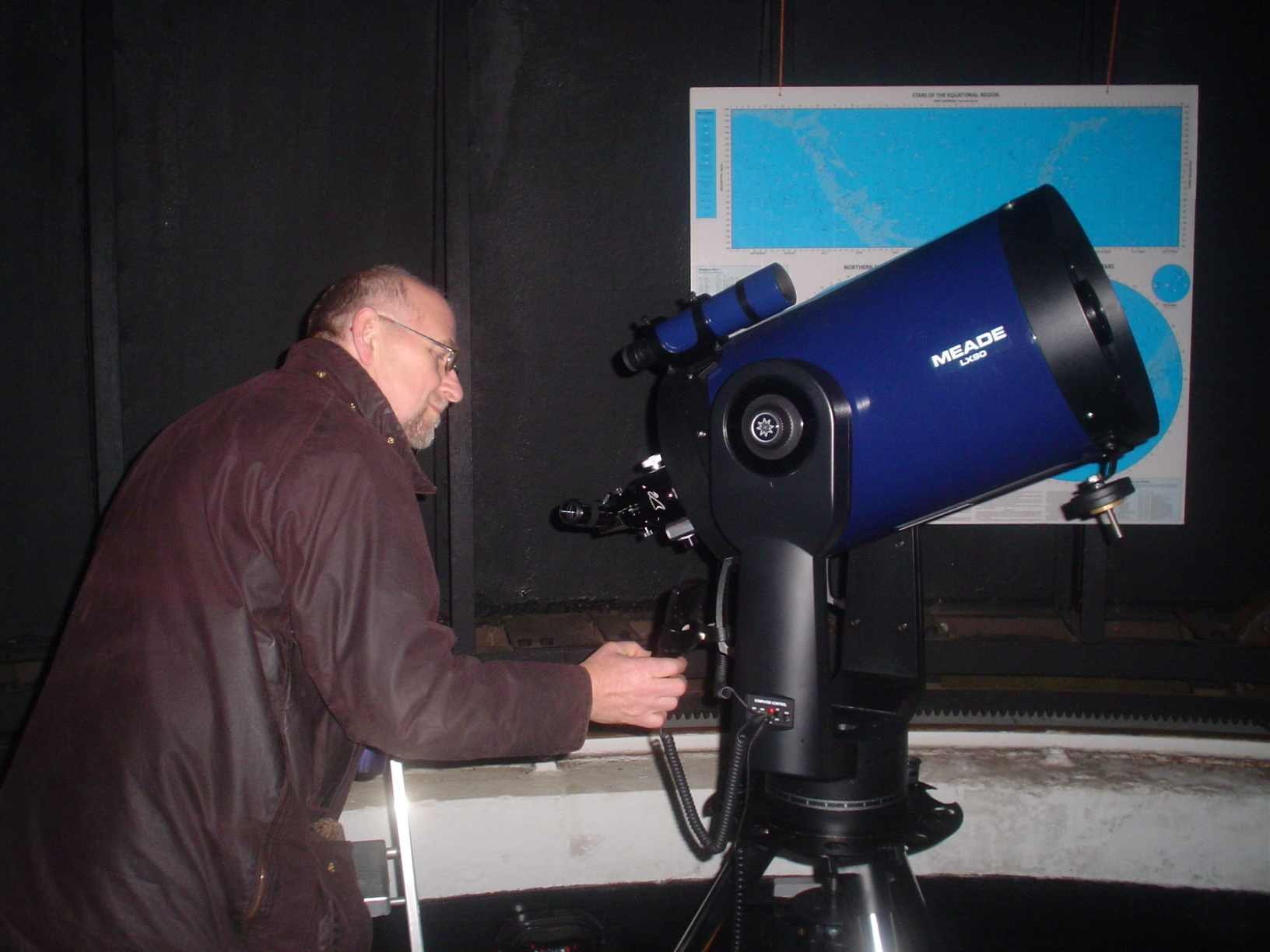
Meade Telescope

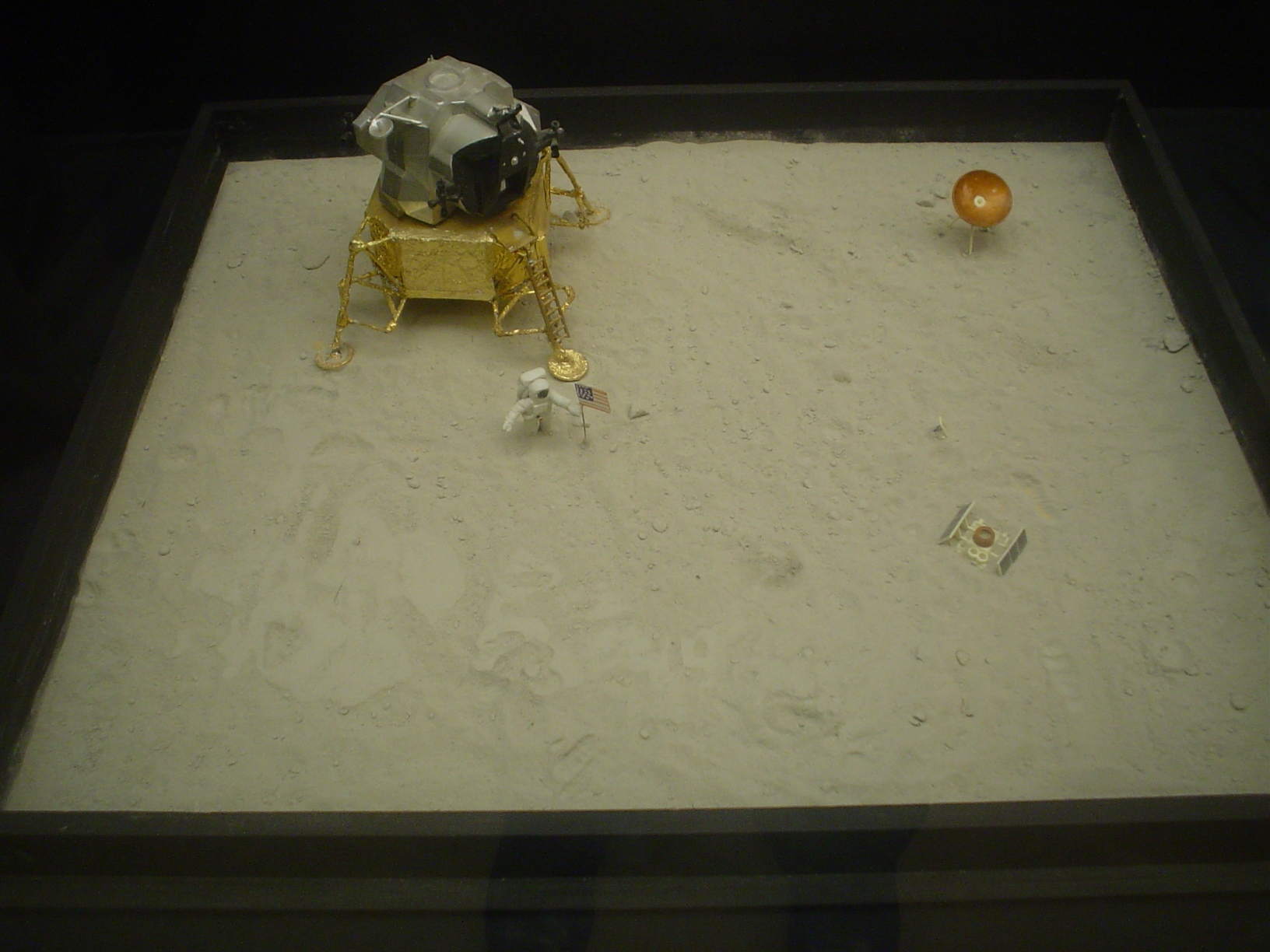
Display of Moon landing

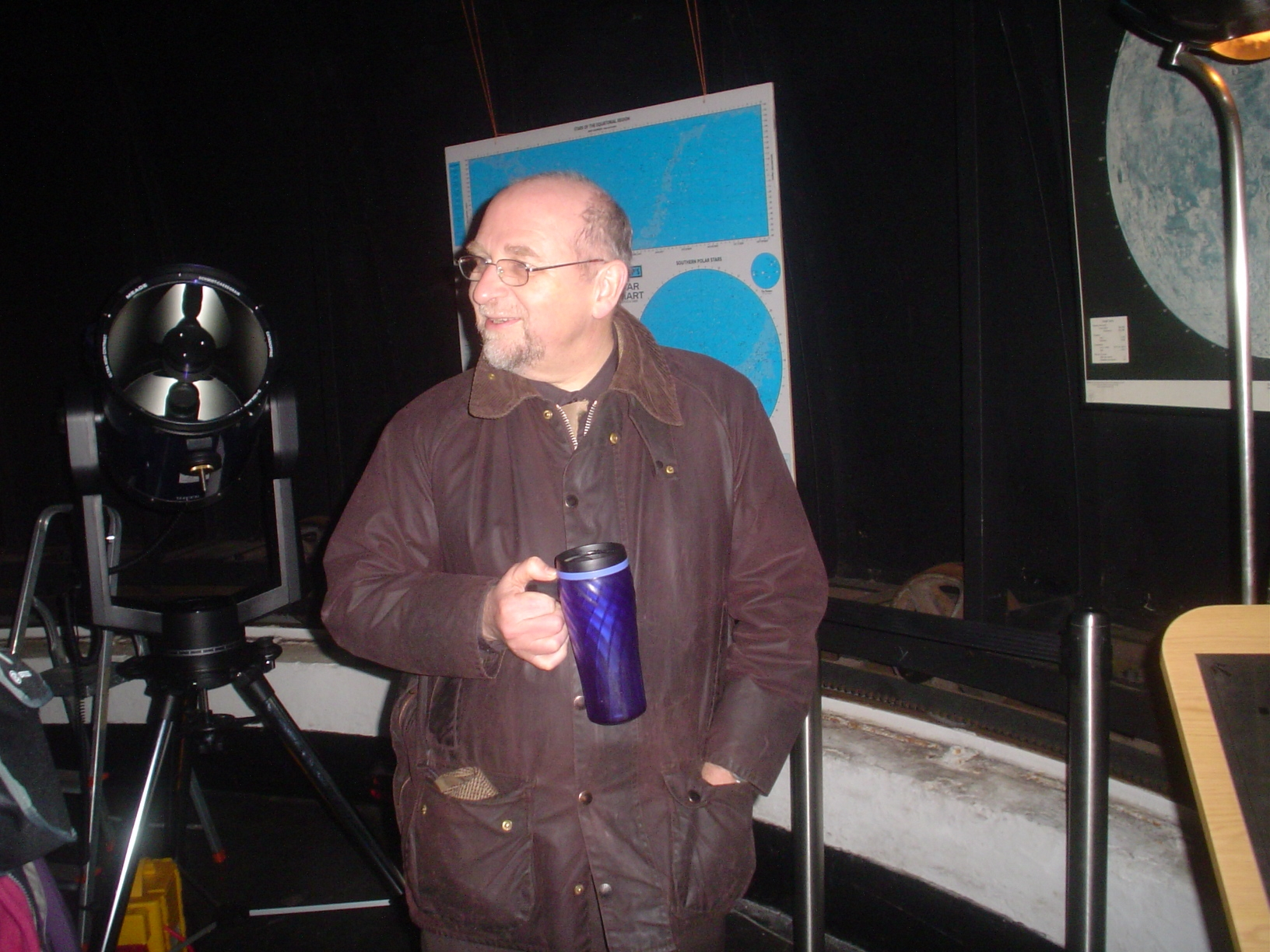
Astronomer Dr. Bill Samson

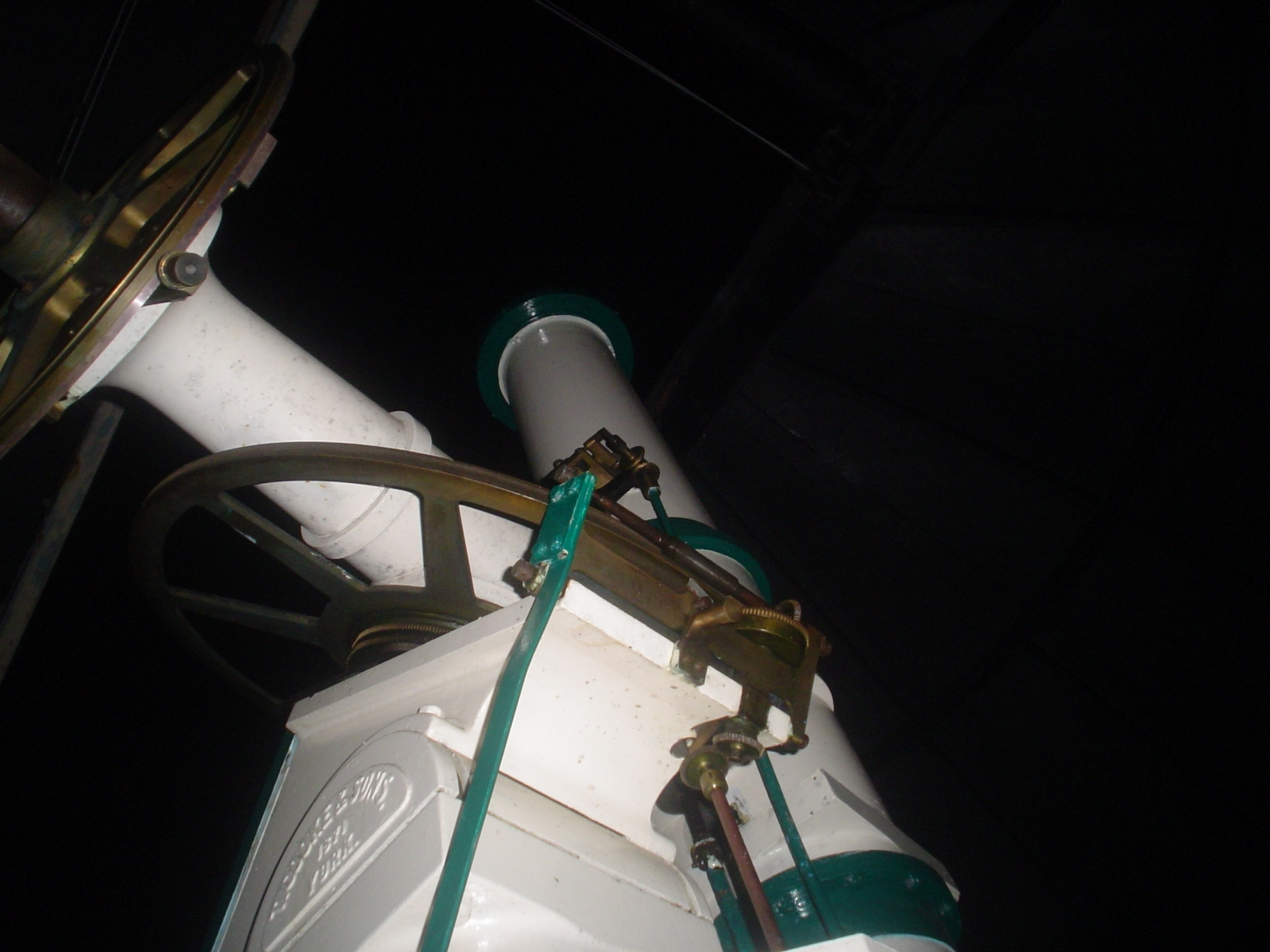
Telescope to the Night Sky

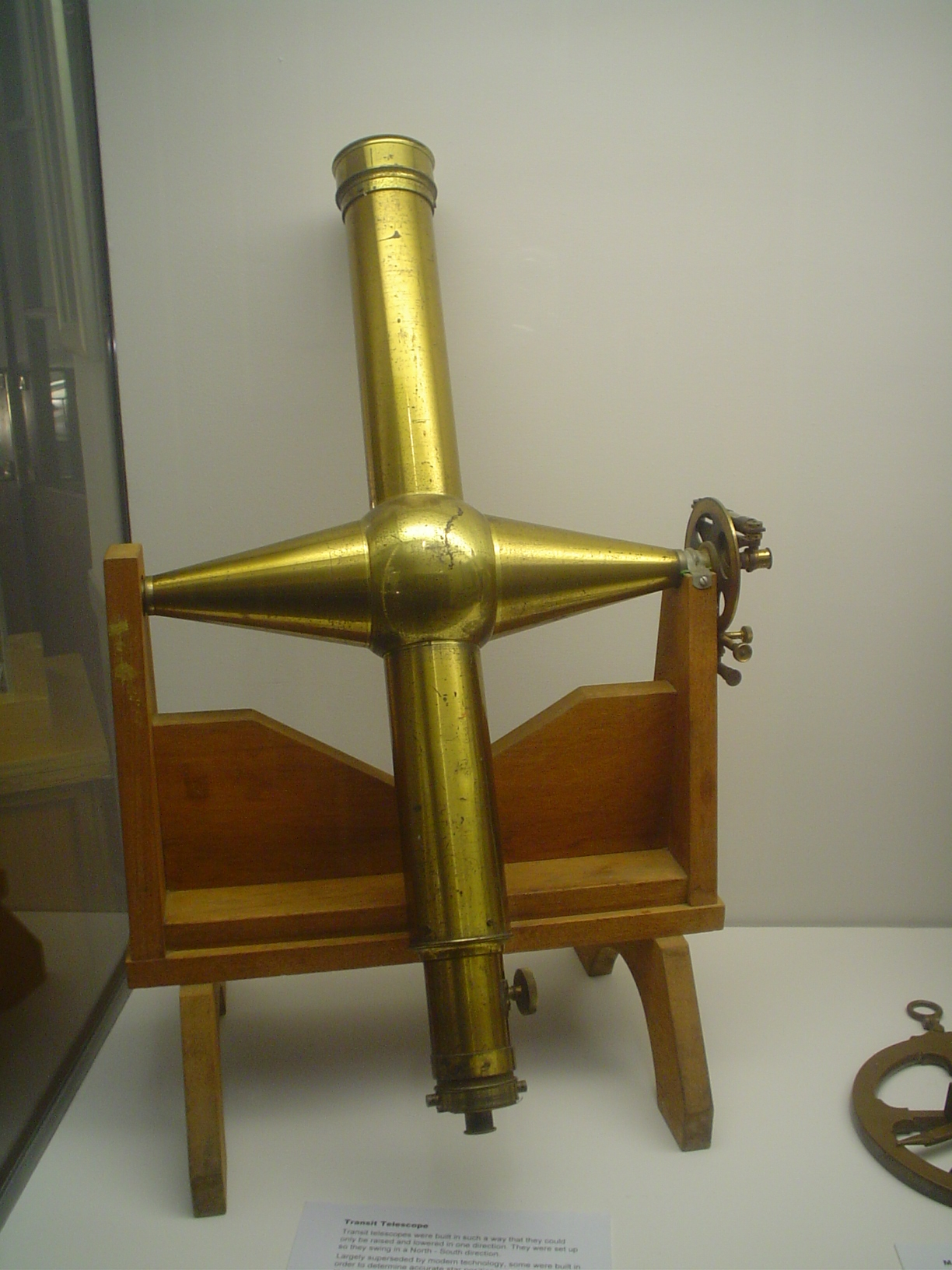
Transit Telescope

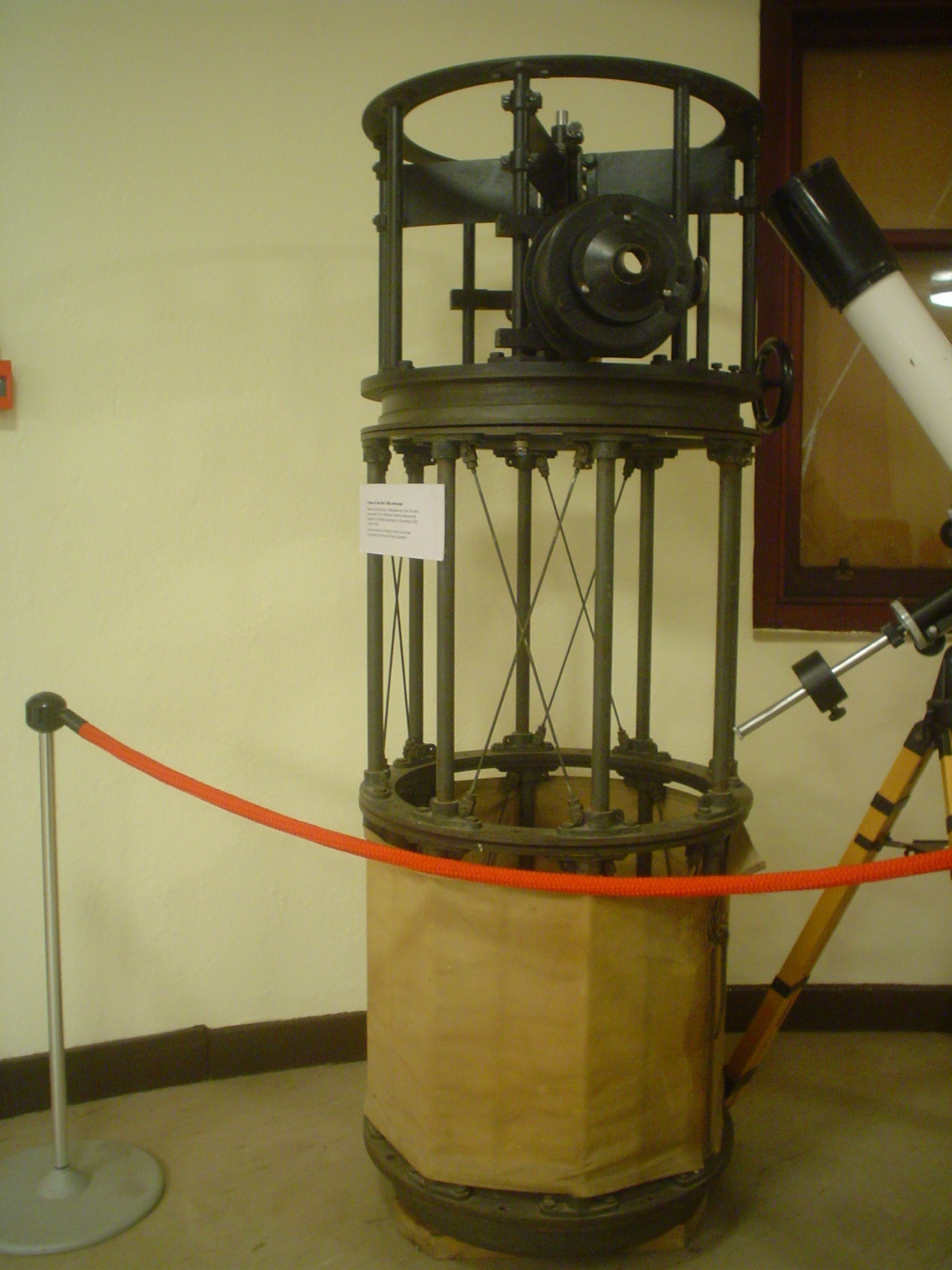
Frame of the first Mills telescope

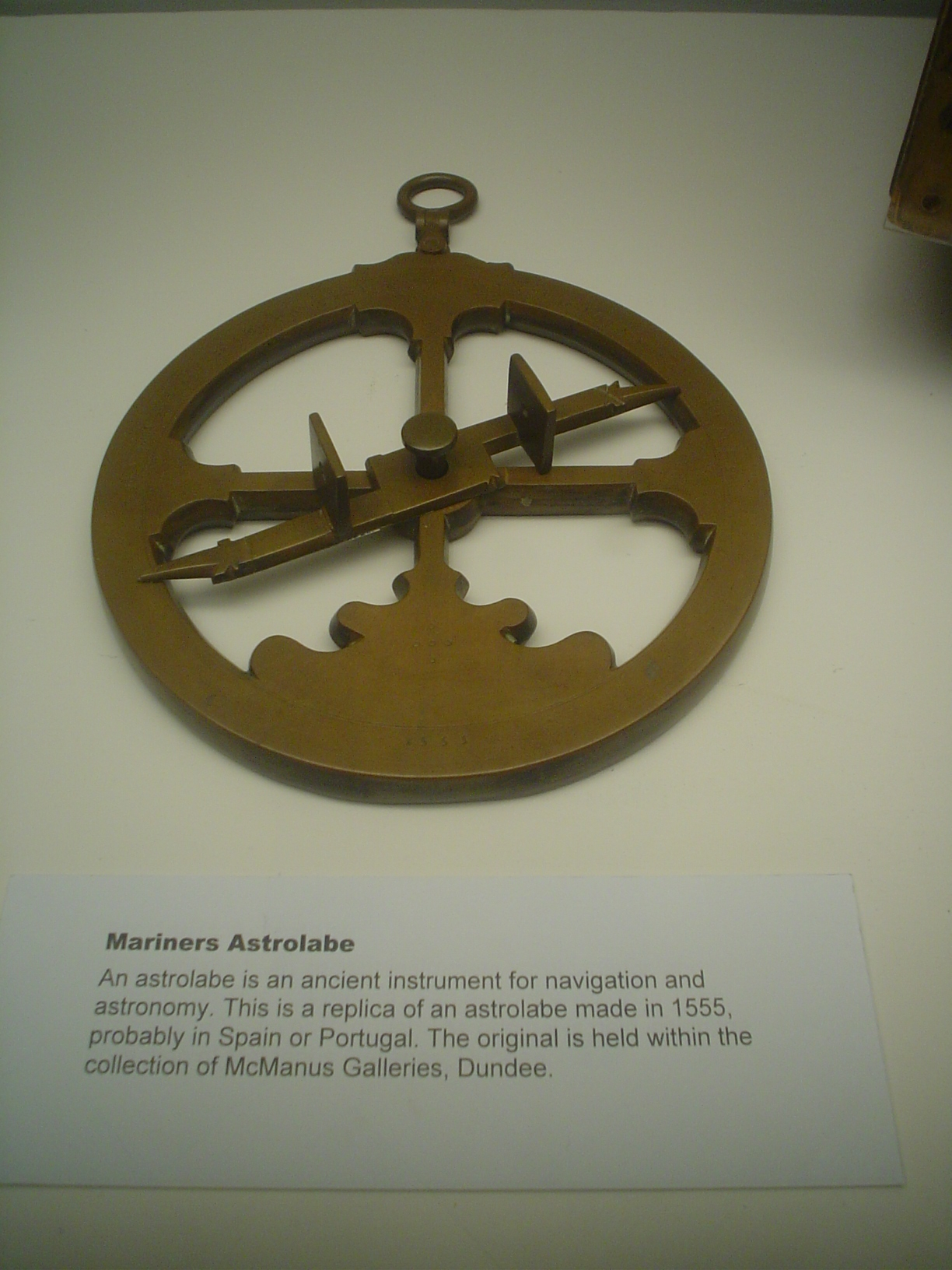
Mariners Astrolabe

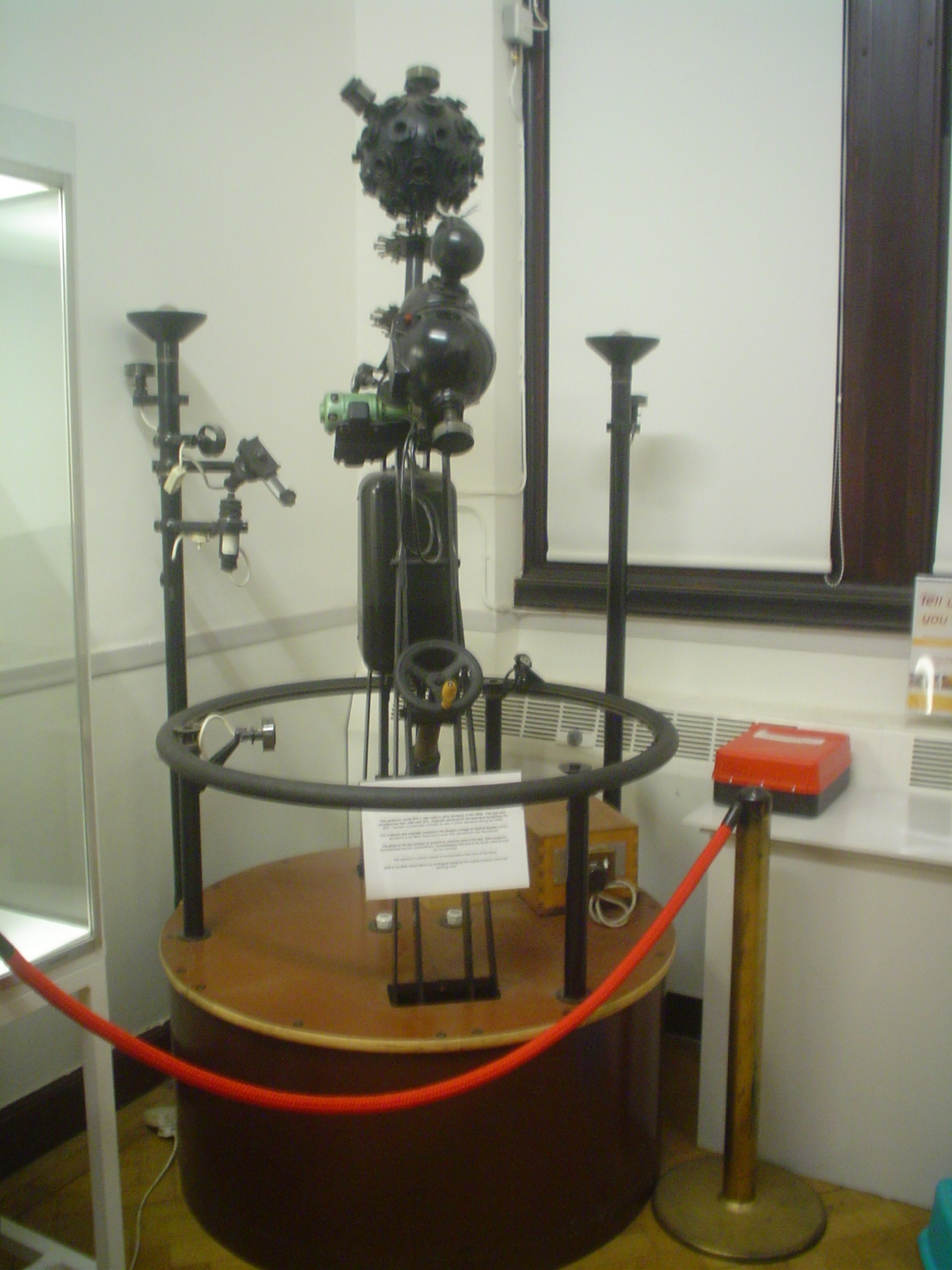
Old Planetarium Projector

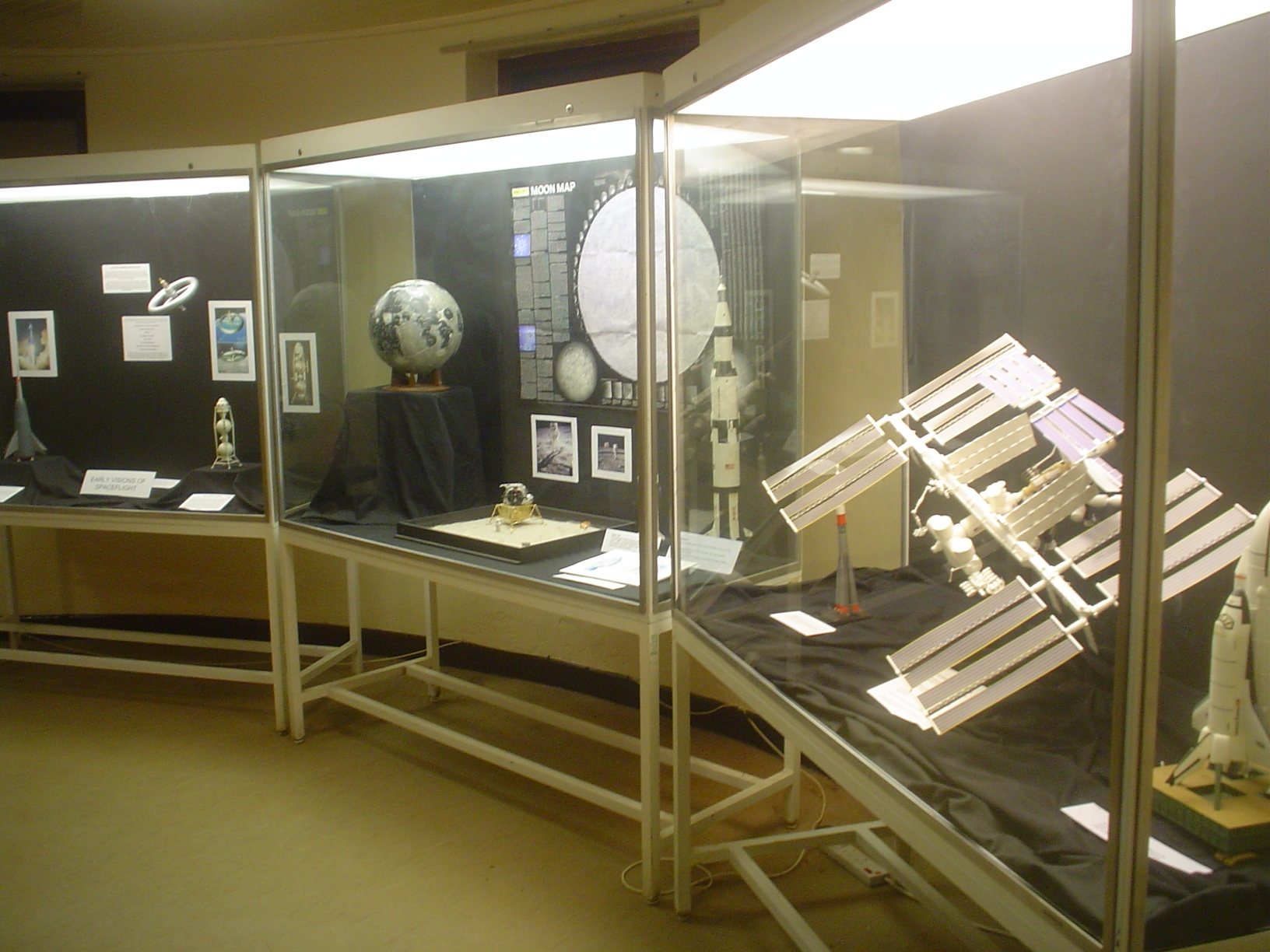
Mills Observatory display

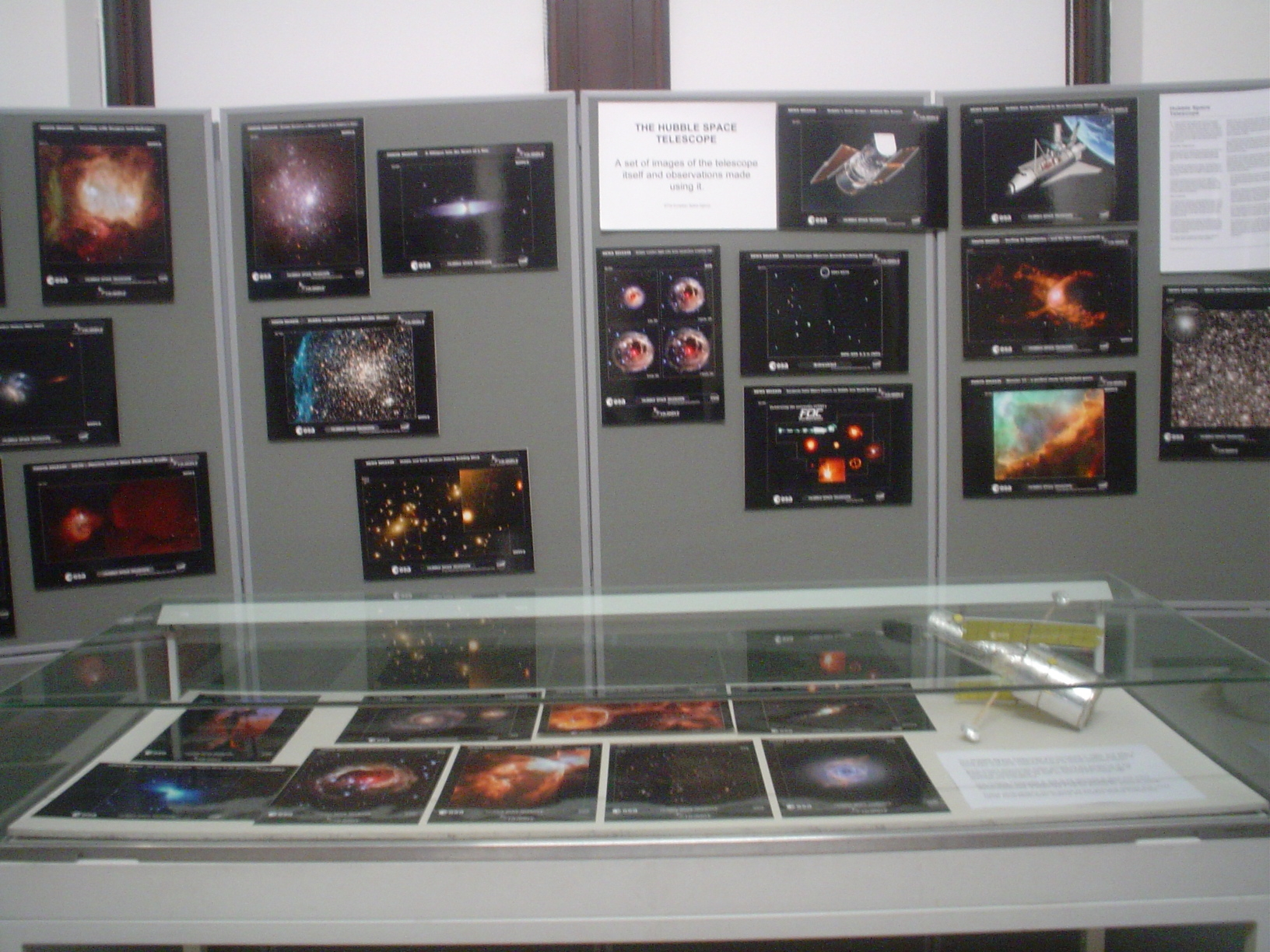
Mills Observatory display

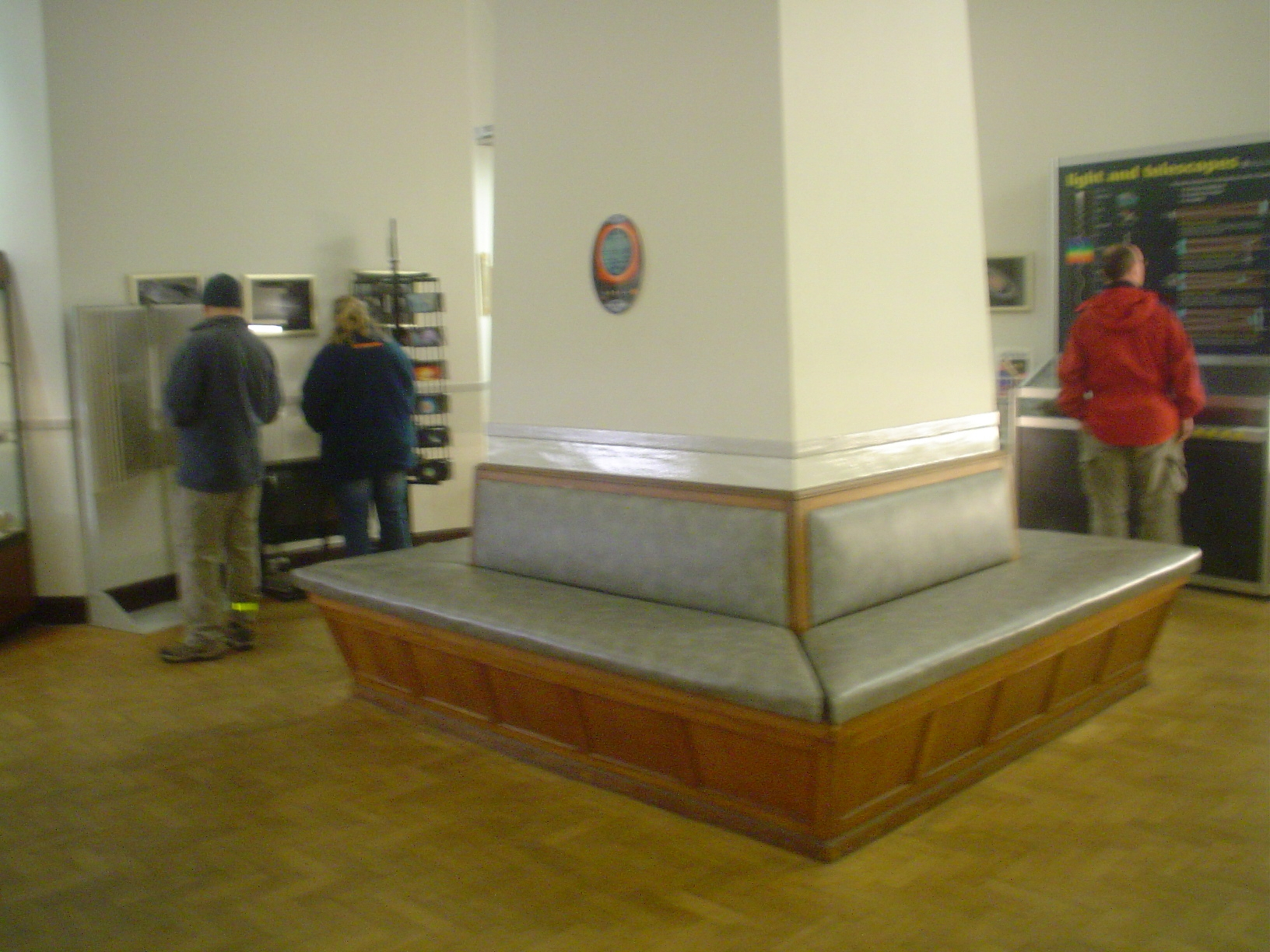
Mills Observatory display

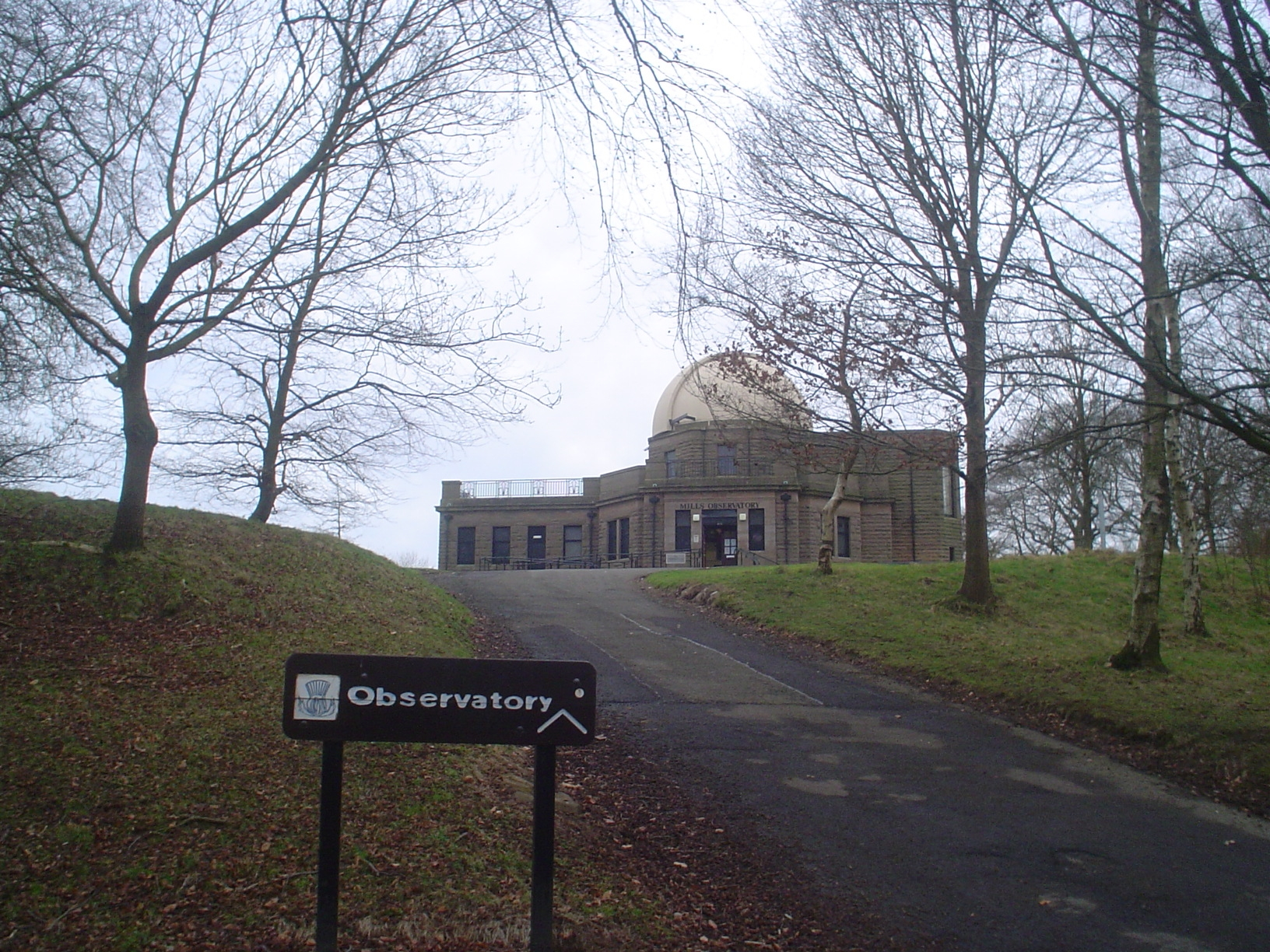
Mills Observatory

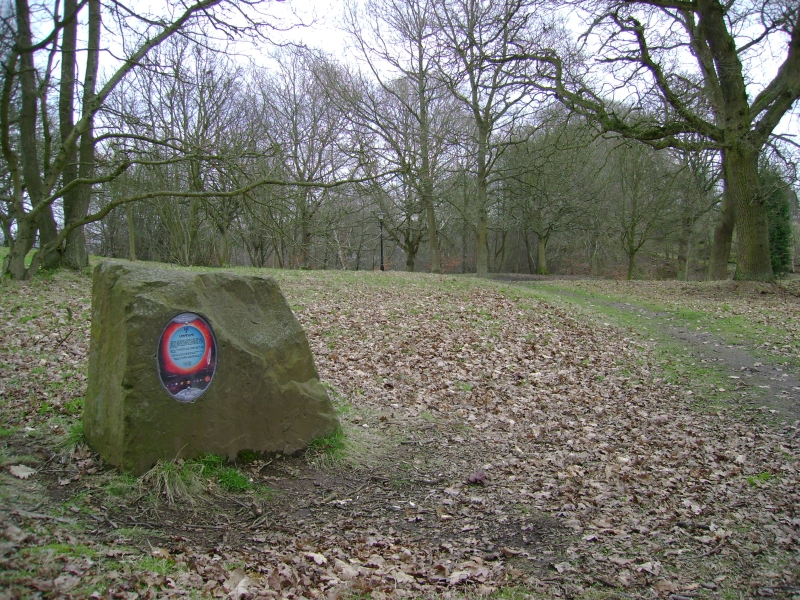
Planet trail

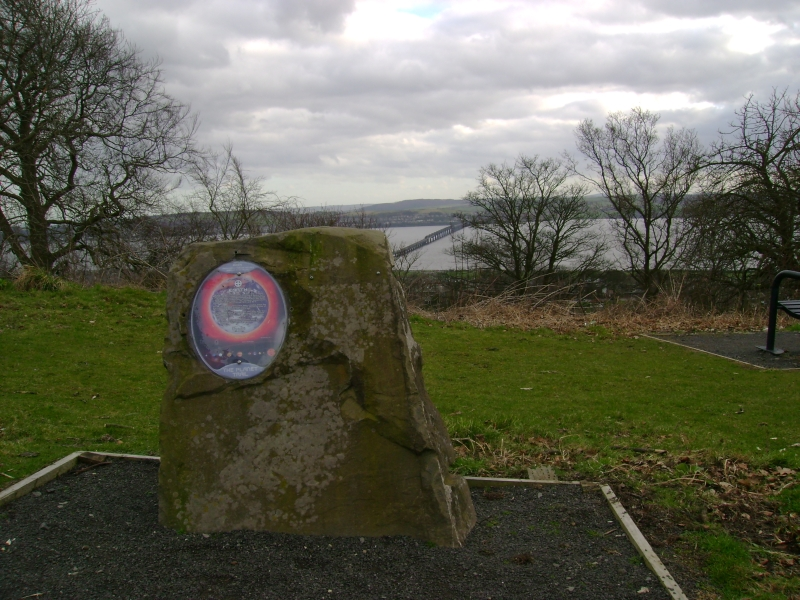
Planet trail

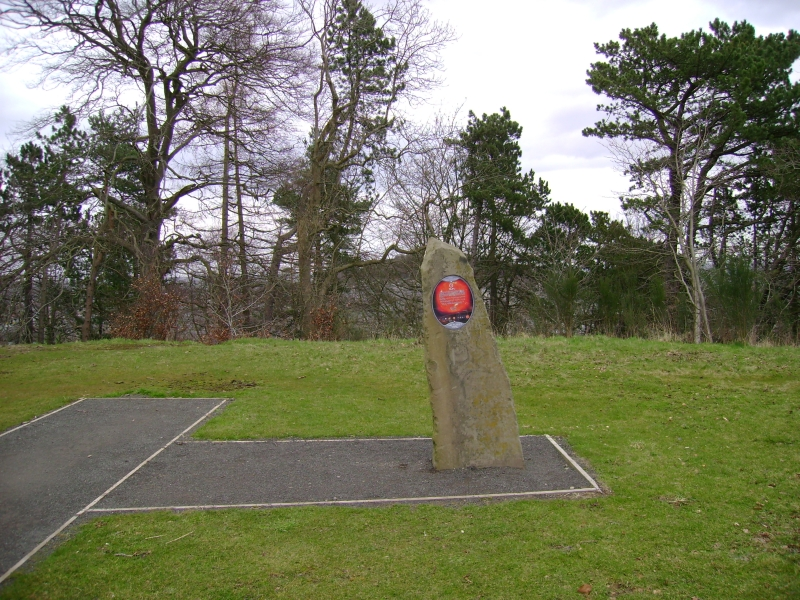
Planet trail

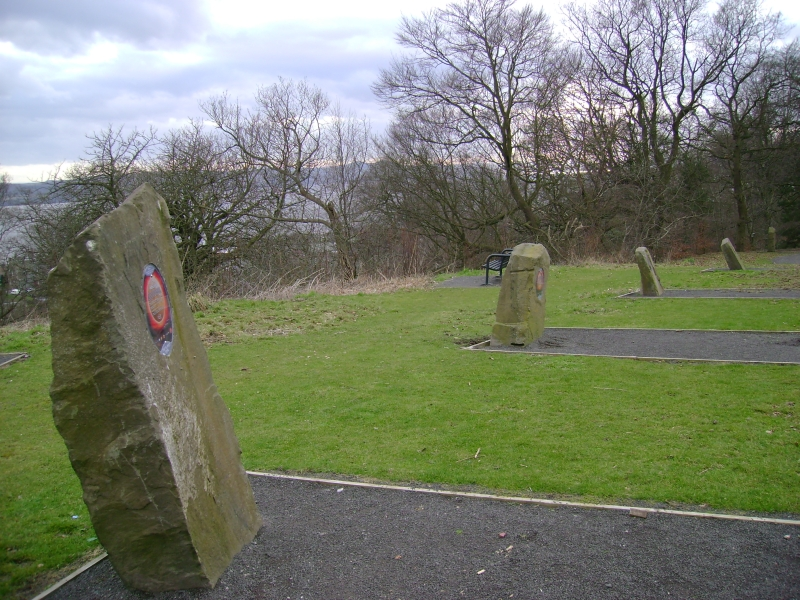
Planet trail

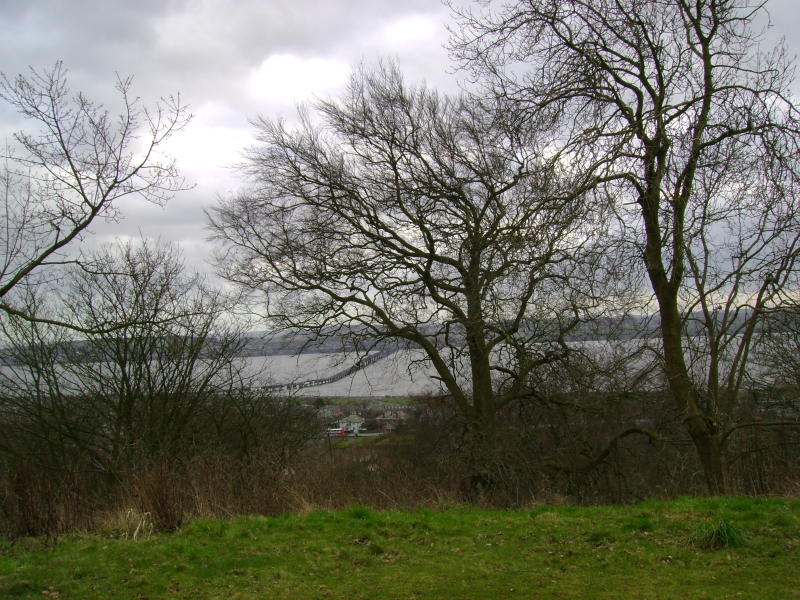
A view from Balgay Hill

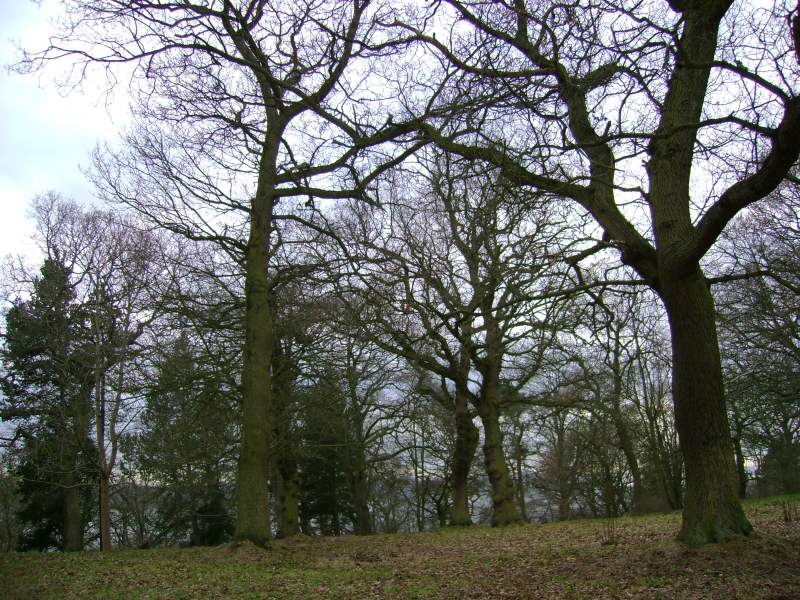
Wooded Balgay Hill

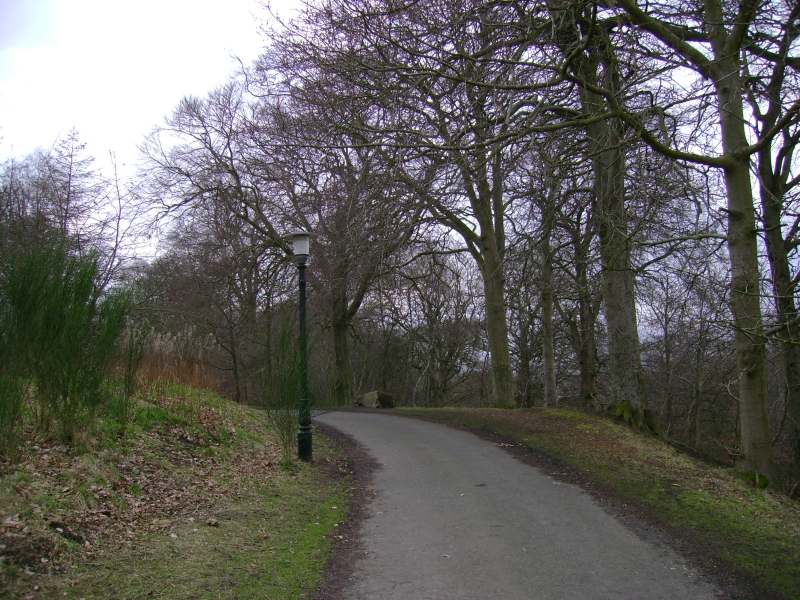
Way through the woods

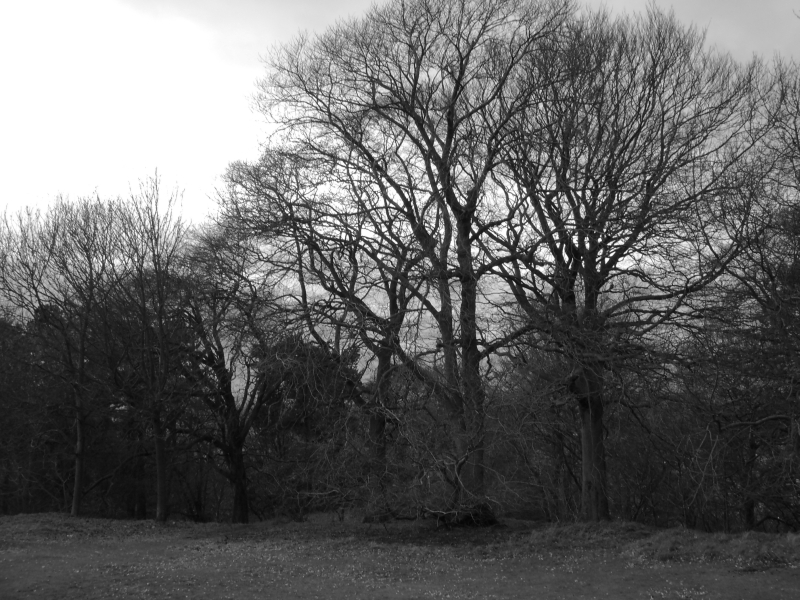
Balgay Hill

== Sources ==
- City of Dundee Scotland: A Chronicle of The city's Office Bearers, Chambers, Regalia, Castles & Twin Cities, Gordon Bennett Design Limited, Dundee City Archive.
- Flood, Thomas. The Mills Observatory : A Historical Survey, Mills Observatory Documents, 1985.
- History of Mills Observatory Images, Dr. William Samson, Astronomer and Curator, Mills Observatory, March 12, 1997.
- The Overview of Mills Observatory
- Official Mills Observatory Home Page
- Presentations and Talks, Dr. William Samson, Robert Law and Stuart Clark at the Mills Observatory, Dundee.

== See also ==
- Space observatory
- Timeline of telescopes, observatories, and observing technology
- List of astronomical observatories
- List of observatory codes
- List of largest optical telescopes in the 19th century
