= James MacLellan Brown =

Scottish architect (1886–1967)

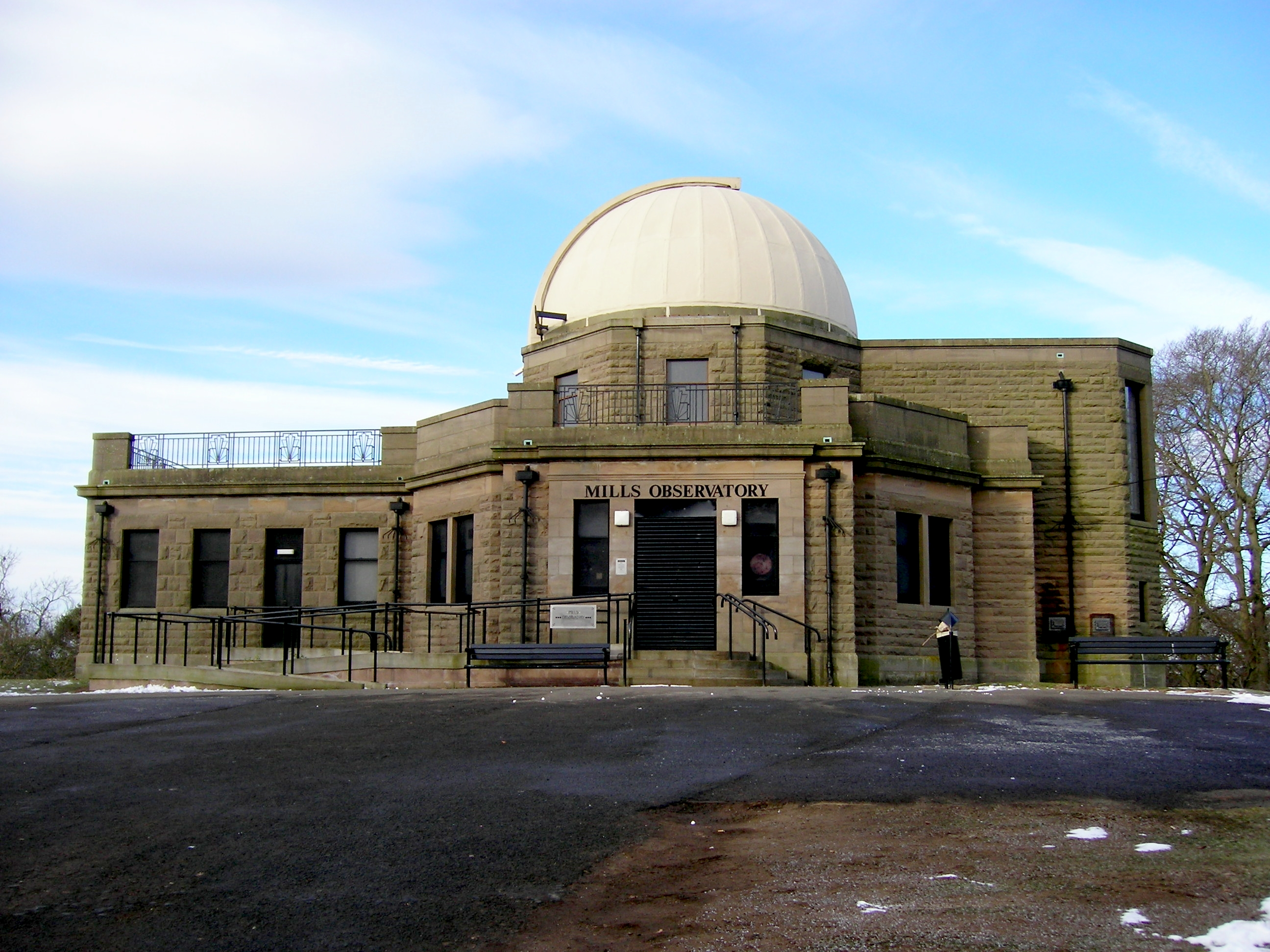
Mills Observatory, 1935

James MacLellan Brown (21 September 1886 – 25 December 1967) was a Scottish architect who was the city planner of Dundee, Scotland, known for remodelling of Sir John James Burnet's designs (1931) and designing the Mills Observatory (1935).

Brown was born in 1886, the son of David Brown, a weaver, and Janet MacLellan Brown.

Brown was the assistant to the City Architect, James Thomson, who had originally planned an immense Beaux-Arts style Civic Centre covering the centre of Dundee. When the First World War intervened, his plans were scaled down and he retired in 1924. Thomson's ideas for extending City Square were developed again in 1924, when the École des Beaux-Arts-trained Burnet was commissioned to produce designs for the east and west wings to City Square. Thomson died in 1927, and James MacLellan Brown, as Depute City Architect, remodelled Burnet's designs in 1931 and produced the scheme that was built. Later Brown collaborated with Professor Ralph Allen Sampson, Astronomer Royal for Scotland, in designing Mills Observatory, a much more modern building than the one originally planned before the war.

Brown died of a pulmonary embolism at Maryfield Hospital in Dundee on Christmas Day 1967, two weeks after suffering a heart attack.
