= William Samson =

Scottish astronomer and computer scientist

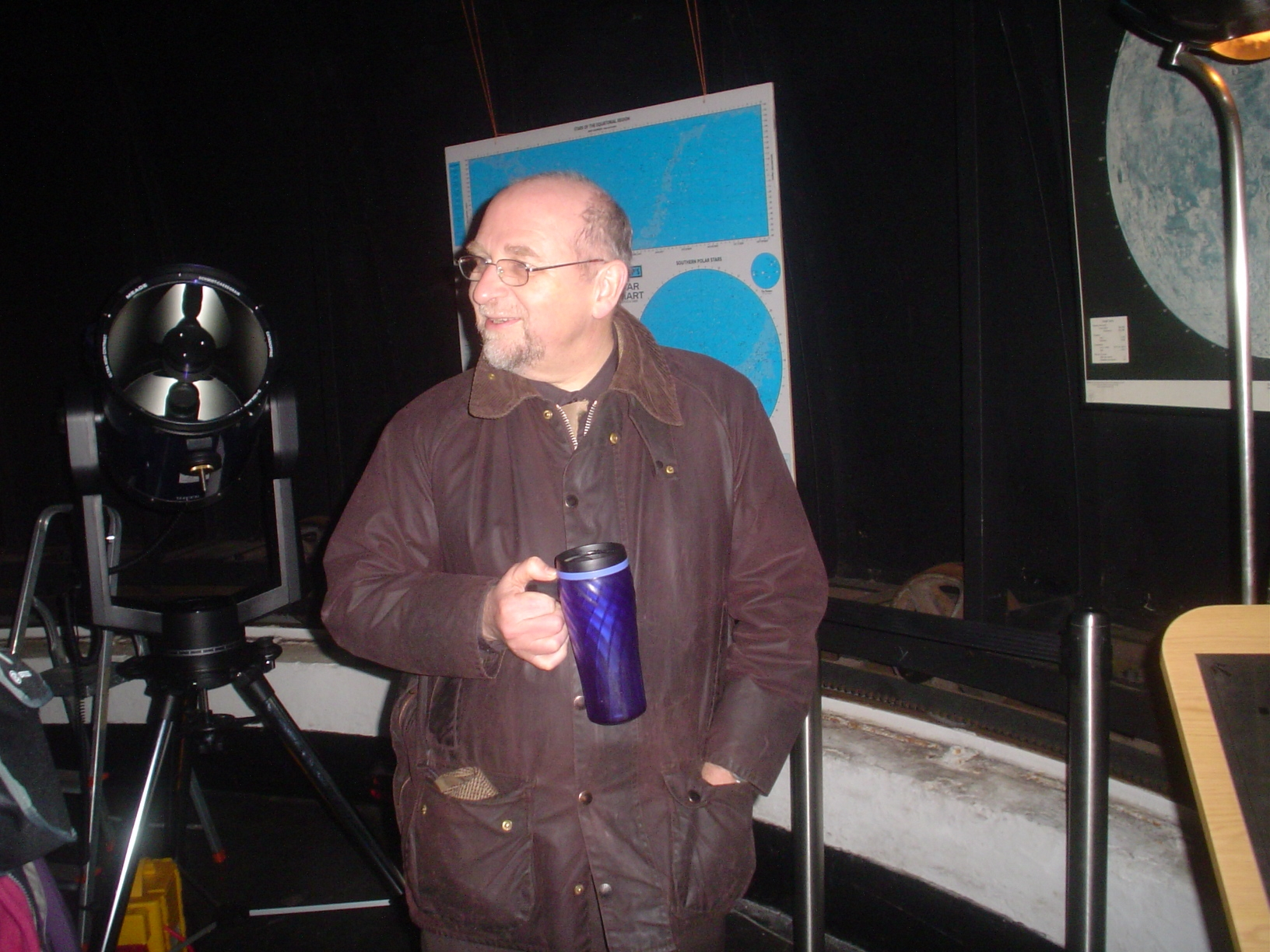
William Byars Samson in 2007

William Byars Samson (born 1943, in Forfar) is a Scottish astronomer, academic, computer scientist and a researcher in the fields of Astronomy, Databases, Artificial Intelligence, and Artificial Life.

Will Samson graduated with a degree in mathematics from University of St. Andrews in 1966. He earned his PhD in Astronomy in 1971 from the University of Edinburgh. In 1976, Samson went on to study at Heriot-Watt University where he obtained his MSc in Computer Science."

== Early years ==
William Samson's earliest fascination with the skies came when he was seven years old and his mother took him outside to point out great winter constellations like the Plough and Orion. Another inspiration was his music teacher at Forfar Academy, Willie Bernard, who took the class on a trip to the Mills Observatory. "He did that when he got fed up trying to teach us to sing."

Bill then aged 12 went back home with great fascination of the celestial constellations and built his first telescope using old spectacle lenses scrounged from an optician in Forfar, that he put into a cardboard tube. According to Samson, "It wasn't wonderful, but good enough to see craters on the moon." He then went on to build his second and third telescopes from kits. The fourth one he built from scratch by grinding a disc of plate glass to make a mirror.

== Career ==
In 1971 he was appointed as the scientific officer at Home Office until 1973. In 1973, he became a lecturer of computer science at Dundee Institute of Technology for seven years. In 1980 he was appointed as the lecturer of computer science at the University of Stirling. Later he was appointed as the senior lecturer (1980–1982) and reader (1985–1997) in computing at the University of Abertay. In 1997, he was the acting head of School of Informatics at the Abertay University. From 1997 to 2002, he was a visiting fellow at the University of Abertay. He became the curator and the official astronomer at Mills Observatory in 2002 until his retirement on 13 March 2007.

Samson is currently the honorary reader in University of Abertay and honorary lecturer in engineering and physics at the University of Dundee from 2002. He is also noted as a research student supervisor and research degree external examiner. His publication includes 25 refereed journal articles and over 30 conference papers.

== Sources ==
- Astronomical Society of Edinburgh, Journal 45, Scottish Astronomy Weekend 2002
- Mills Observatory, Dundee City Council, Dundee City Archive
- Biography of Dr. William Samson, Mills Observatory, Dundee
