= Balgay Park =

Park in Dundee, Scotland

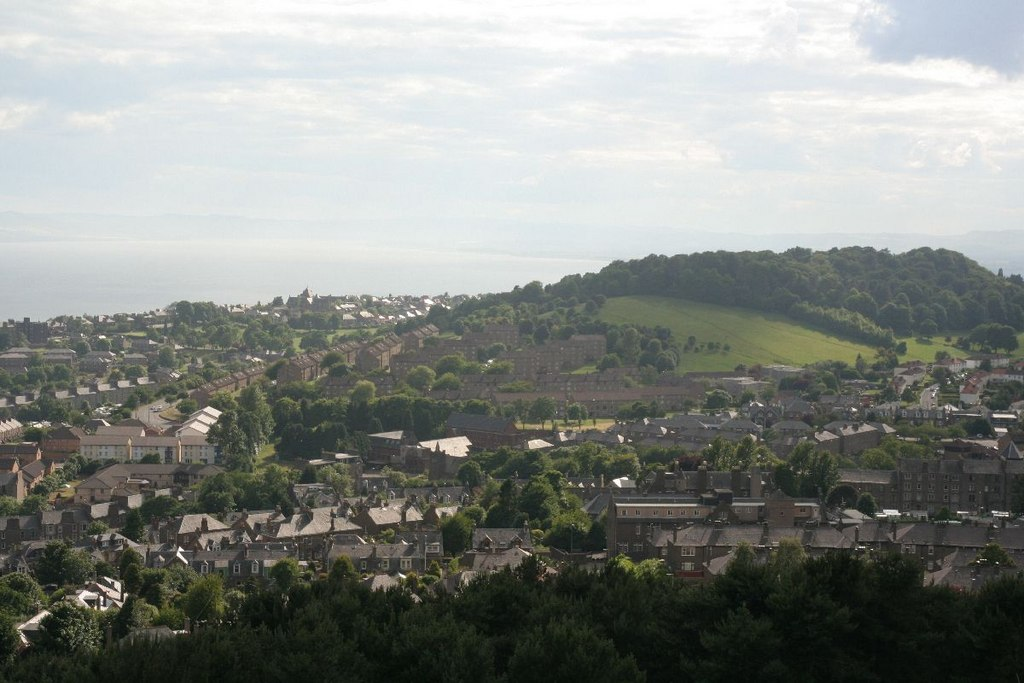
- Balgay Hill within Balgay Park from the Dundee Law
- Interactive map of Balgay Park
- Type: Public park
- Location: Balgay, Dundee, Scotland
- Coordinates: 56.469734°N 2.990000°W
- Opened: 1871
- Operated by: Dundee City Council

Inventory of Gardens and Designed Landscapes in Scotland
- Official name: Balgay Park
- Designated: 31 March 2007
- Reference no.: GDL00039

Balgay Park is a public park located in the Balgay area of Dundee, Scotland. The park encompasses Balgay Hill which is the smaller of the two hills in Dundee at 146m, with the larger Dundee Law 2.6 miles away. Both hills are visible from each other.

Balgay Park is known for its scenic woodlands, walking paths, and the prominent Mills Observatory situated at the summit of Balgay Hill. Established in the 19th century, Balgay Park remains one of Dundee's oldest and most beloved green spaces, offering both recreational and educational opportunities for locals and visitors.

Balgay Park is also connected to Lochee Park and Victoria Park, two popular Dundee parks. Victoria Park is accessible via a footbridge that spans the cycle way between Glamis Road and Scott Street. This bridge allows visitors to traverse between the two parks, expanding access to green spaces and recreational areas in the city.

== History ==
Balgay Park and the surrounding area have a long history dating back to at least the 18th century. Early plans from 1729 show Balgay House as a laird's house with formal avenues and gardens. Balgay Hill, located to the north of the house, was a large wooded area that provided protection and scenic views of the River Tay. By 1801, the landscape had been improved with a curved driveway and more formal gardens.

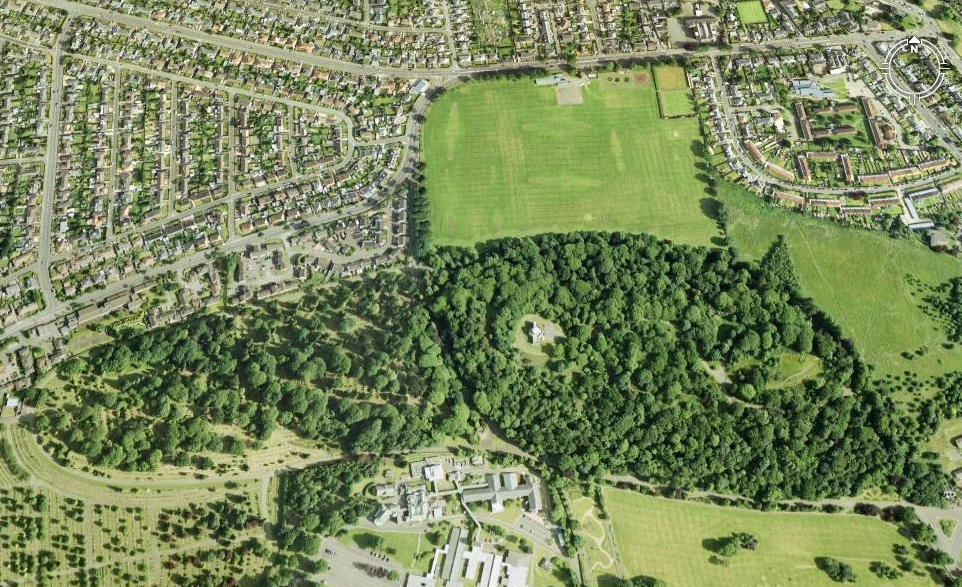
Balgay Park, including Balgay Hill from above. Mills Observatory can be seen in the eye of the hill.

In 1871, the Police Commissioners of Dundee acquired 60 acres of Balgay Hill to create a public park and cemetery. The park benefited from its existing woodland and offered impressive views over the Tay and surrounding areas. The deep gorge separating the Necropolis (on the west side) from Balgay Park (on the east) became a natural division. A bridge and bandstand were added in 1877, enhancing the park’s appeal.

Balgay Cemetery, developed by civil engineer William McKelvie, was laid out to preserve the natural beauty of the hill. Inspired by Paris’s Père Lachaise, the cemetery became a key feature of the park, with its layout simplified over time. Lochee Park, to the northeast, was added in 1890, donated by the Cox Brothers as a recreation ground for the city. Today, Balgay Hill and Victoria Park remain as key parts of this historical landscape, while other areas have since been developed.

The development of Balgay Park was part of Dundee’s efforts to provide green, open spaces for its rapidly industrialising population. It was officially opened in 1871, during an era when many British cities were creating public parks to improve the quality of life for urban residents.

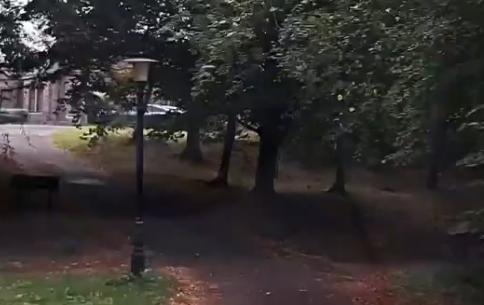
A pathway in Balgay Park leading up to Mills Observatory.

Designed to offer a natural retreat, the park soon became a popular destination for relaxation, exercise, and social activities. The design incorporated existing natural features, including the prominent Balgay Hill, which offers stunning views of the River Tay and beyond.

Mills Observatory designed by James MacLellan Brown was built in 1935 at the summit of the hill. It was originally planned to be built on the summit of the Dundee Law, but setbacks surrounding the planning of the observatory, and the outbreak of the Great War caused greater delays in its construction.

Balgay Park was created as a recreational space for the city’s working-class residents, and has cemented its status as an integral part of Dundee’s heritage.

== Features ==
=== Balgay Hill ===
Balgay Hill is a prominent natural feature in the western part of Dundee, Scotland, offering stunning panoramic views over the River Tay and the city. The hill is situated within the Balgay area of the city, and forms part of the Balgay Park, which also includes the Mills Observatory, extensive woodlands, and walking paths.

==== Mills Observatory ====
Situated on Balgay Hill, the Mills Observatory is one of the park's key attractions. Opened in 1935, it is the only full-time public observatory in the UK. Visitors can explore the wonders of the night sky using the observatory’s telescopes or participate in educational programmes and viewings. The observatory also holds regular events and exhibitions related to astronomy. In addition to the observatory; there is a 'Planet Trail' which offers a symbolic map of the Solar System, spread along an informal walk on the crest of the hill.

=== Balgay Cemetery ===
Located next to Balgay Park is Balgay Cemetery, which opened in 1870. The cemetery, with its Victorian-style monuments and carefully planned layout, adds historical depth to the area. Many notable figures from Dundee’s past are buried here, and the cemetery continues to be a place of reflection and remembrance for the local community.

== Wildlife ==
The park is home to an array of plant and animal species, with its extensive woodlands hosting a variety of trees, including oak, beech, and sycamore. These natural surroundings make Balgay Park a haven for wildlife, including birds, foxes, squirrels, and various other small mammals. The diversity of habitats attracts nature lovers and birdwatchers, who can enjoy the sights and sounds of this peaceful environment.

== Sports and recreation ==
Balgay Park is popular for a range of outdoor activities. The park’s well-maintained paths make it a prime destination for walking, running, and nature exploration. Its elevated points provide ideal locations for picnics or enjoying views over the city and the River Tay. The peaceful atmosphere and natural beauty of the park also make it a frequent spot for dog walkers and families.

In addition to leisure activities, the park has hosted various local events over the years, bringing the community together for celebrations, nature walks, and educational sessions. Seasonal changes offer different experiences for visitors, with the park displaying vibrant colours in autumn and a serene landscape during winter.

== See also ==
- Balgay
- Mills Observatory
- Dundee Law
