= Cape Photographic Catalogue =

Southern Hemisphere star catalogue

The Cape Photographic Catalogue (CPC) is a star catalogue containing 68,467 stars in the Southern Hemisphere whose declinations are either between −30° and −40° or between −52° and −90°. It contains positions, proper motions, magnitudes, and spectral types, and was published by the Cape Observatory between 1954 and 1968. This was the last major astronomical catalogue to be assembled without the use of photoelectric sequences.

This catalogue was conceived by H. S. Jones and undertaken by R. H. Stoy in 1938 under the direction of J. Jackson. The photographic plates were taken using the Cape twin photometric cameras, cataloguing stars down to about magnitude 11.
