= E Carinae =

The Bayer designations e Carinae and E Carinae are distinct and the designation e Carinae is shared by two stars in the constellation Carina:

- for e^{1} Carinae, see HD 73390
- for e^{2} Carinae, see HD 73389
- for E Carinae, see V345 Carinae

== See also ==
- ε Carinae
