= Mineur =

Mineur is a French-language surname derived from the appellation "minor ", "the Younger", "underage". In some cases in can originate from the occupation of miner or sapper. Notable people with the surname include:

- Anne-Marie Mineur (born 1967), Dutch politician
- Henri Mineur, French astronomer and mathematician
- Jean Mineur (1902–1985) French pioneer of advertising and advertising cinema
- Marie Mineur (1831–1923) Belgian factory worker, one of the first Belgian feminist activists

== See also ==
- Mineur (crater), Lunar crater named after Henri Mineur
