= V3903 Sagittarii =

Binary star system in the constellation Sagittarius

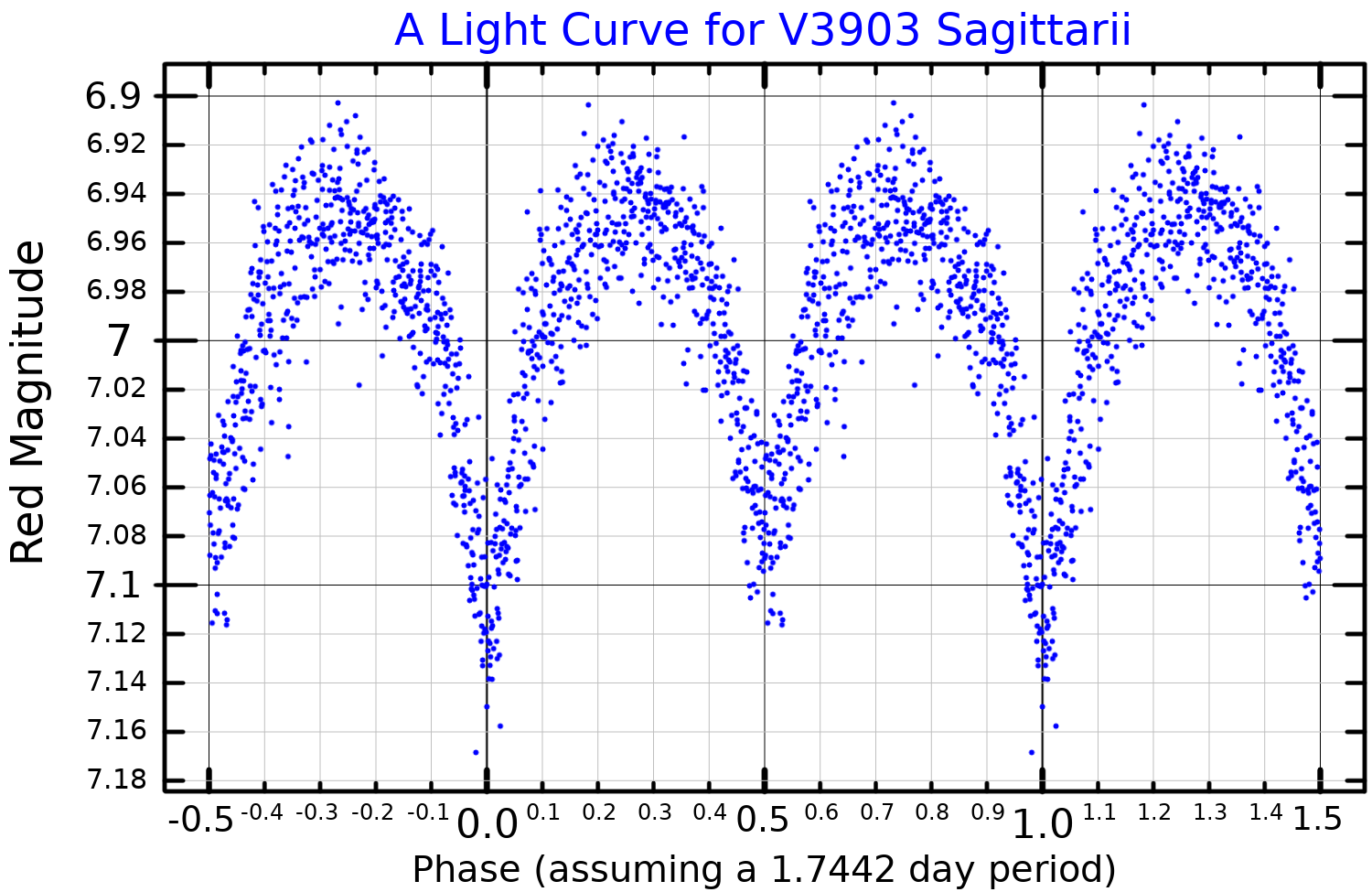
- A red-light light curve for V3903 Sagittarii, adapted from Wraight et al. (2011)

Observation data Epoch J2000.0 Equinox ICRS
- Constellation: Sagittarius
- Right ascension: 18^{h} 09^{m} 17.6999^{s}
- Declination: −23° 59′ 18.2312″
- Apparent magnitude (V): 7.00–7.45

Characteristics
- Spectral type: O7V(n)z + B0:V:
- U−B color index: −0.82
- B−V color index: +0.16
- Variable type: Algol

Astrometry
Proper motion (μ)	RA: +0.87±0.67 mas/yr Dec.: −0.66±0.42 mas/yr
Parallax (π)	0.8368±0.0258 mas
Distance	3,900 ± 100 ly (1,200 ± 40 pc)
Absolute magnitude (M_{V})	−4.59 + −3.69

Orbit
Period (P)	1.744204 days
Eccentricity (e)	0
Inclination (i)	65.20°
Semi-amplitude (K_{1}) (primary)	236.6 km/s
Semi-amplitude (K_{2}) (secondary)	339.4 km/s

Details

A
Mass	27.27 M_{☉}
Radius	8.088 R_{☉}
Luminosity	122,000 L_{☉}
Surface gravity (log g)	4.058 cgs
Temperature	38,000 K
Rotational velocity (v sin i)	230 km/s

B
Mass	19.01 M_{☉}
Radius	6.125 R_{☉}
Luminosity	45,500 L_{☉}
Surface gravity (log g)	4.143 cgs
Temperature	34,100 K
Rotational velocity (v sin i)	170 km/s
Age	1.6 Myr

Other designations
- V3903 Sgr, CD−24°13962, HD 165921, HIP 88943, SAO 186366

Database references
SIMBAD	data

V3903 Sagittarii (also known as 11 Sagittarii, or its abbreviation 11 Sgr) is an eclipsing binary star system in the constellation Sagittiarus. It creates an H II region LBN 29 (Sh 2-29) 1,070 parsecs (3,500 light-years) away from the Sun.

John Flamsteed designated this star the Flamsteed designation 11 Sagittarii, although the designation 11 Sgr is now more often used to refer to the star he designated 1 Sagittarii.

== Properties ==
The system consists of two hot main-sequence stars. The spectral types have historically been accepted as O7V and O9V, but the more recent Galactic O-Star Spectroscopic Survey gives a spectral type of O7V(n)z + B0:V:. The system is one of the youngest-known eclipsing binaries, and one of the few containing such massive stars that have not yet filled their roche lobes. Their likely age is around 1.6 million years, and they have current masses of 27 M_{☉} and 19 M_{☉}.

In 1973, Alan William James Cousins announced that the star, which he referred to as HD 165921, varies in brightness. It was given its variable star designation, V3903 Sagittarii, in 1977. The General Catalogue of Variable Stars lists it as a possible hot irregular Orion variable star, but it has been shown to be a detached eclipsing binary system. The two stars are detached, that is they do not fill their roche lobes, which makes it an Algol-type eclipsing variable. The period is one day, 18 hours, 52 minutes.

The distance derived from the annual parallax measured by the Hipparcos satellite is around 459 parsecs (1,500 ly), but the distance calculated from the physical properties of the two stars is 1,500 pc. Later measurements have resulted in refined distances estimates of 1,070 pc and 1,200 pc.
