= HR 6801 =

Star in the constellation Sagittarius

- Location of HR 6801 (circled)

Observation data Epoch J2000 Equinox ICRS
- Constellation: Sagittarius
- Right ascension: 18^{h} 11^{m} 43.33342^{s}
- Declination: −23° 42′ 04.4346″
- Apparent magnitude (V): 4.96

Characteristics
- Evolutionary stage: red clump
- Spectral type: K0III
- U−B color index: +0.90
- B−V color index: +1.05

Astrometry
Radial velocity (R_{v})	+5.71±0.20 km/s
Proper motion (μ)	RA: +9.337 mas/yr Dec.: −31.999 mas/yr
Parallax (π)	12.6303±0.2449 mas
Distance	258 ± 5 ly (79 ± 2 pc)
Absolute magnitude (M_{V})	0.49

Details
Mass	2.24 M_{☉}
Radius	13.35+0.14 −0.92 R_{☉}
Luminosity	78.6±1.7 L_{☉}
Surface gravity (log g)	2.65 cgs
Temperature	4,705+171 −25 K
Metallicity [Fe/H]	0.00 dex
Rotational velocity (v sin i)	1.6 km/s

Other designations
- 1 Sgr, CD−23°14047, GC 24799, HD 166464, HIP 89153, HR 6801, SAO 186437, CCDM J18117-2342A, WDS J18117-2342A

Database references
SIMBAD	data

HR 6801 is a single star in the southern zodiac constellation of Sagittarius. It was designated as 1 Sagittarii by Flamsteed, but is now often referred to as 11 Sagittarii. Flamsteed's 11 Sgr actually refers to a different, much fainter star. The object is orange in hue and is visible to the naked eye as a faint point of light with an apparent visual magnitude of 4.96. The distance to this star is approximately 258 light years based on stellar parallax, and it is drifting further away with a radial velocity of +6 km/s.

This is an aging giant star with a stellar classification of K0III. It is a red clump giant, which indicates it is on the horizontal branch and is generating energy through helium fusion at its core. The star has 2.24 times the mass of the Sun and has expanded to 13.4 times the Sun's radius. It is radiating 79 times the luminosity of the Sun from its photosphere at an effective temperature of 4,705 K.

A faint visual companion, component B, has magnitude 11.51 and an angular separation of 43.7″.
