= E Car =

E Car or E-Car may refer to:

- E Carinae, a star in the constellation Carina
- E-Car, a proposed European Union classification for small passenger cars
