= Royal Observatory, Cape of Good Hope =

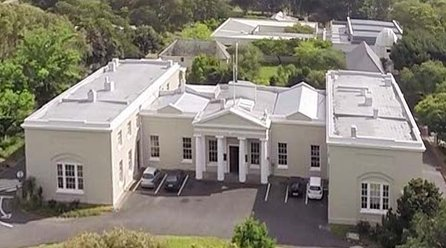
- Main building of the Royal Observatory, Cape of Good Hope
- Alternative names: Cape Observatory
- Organization: South African Astronomical Observatory
- Observatory code: 051
- Location: Observatory, Cape Town
- Coordinates: 33.9347°S 18.4776°E
- Altitude: 15 m (49 ft)
- Established: 20 October 1820
- Closed: 31 December 1971
- Telescopes: SAAO Library
- Related media on Commons

The Royal Observatory, Cape of Good Hope, is a former scientific institution in South Africa. Founded by the British Board of Longitude in 1820, its main building is now the headquarters building of the South African Astronomical Observatory.

The institution was located on a small hill 5 kilometres (3.1 miles) south-east from the centre of Cape Town. During the succeeding century a suburb of the city formed in the area; the suburb was named Observatory after the pre-existing Royal Observatory. It was declared a National Heritage Site in December 2018 and has also been the subject of an ICOMOS/IAU Case Study as a World Heritage Site.

== History ==
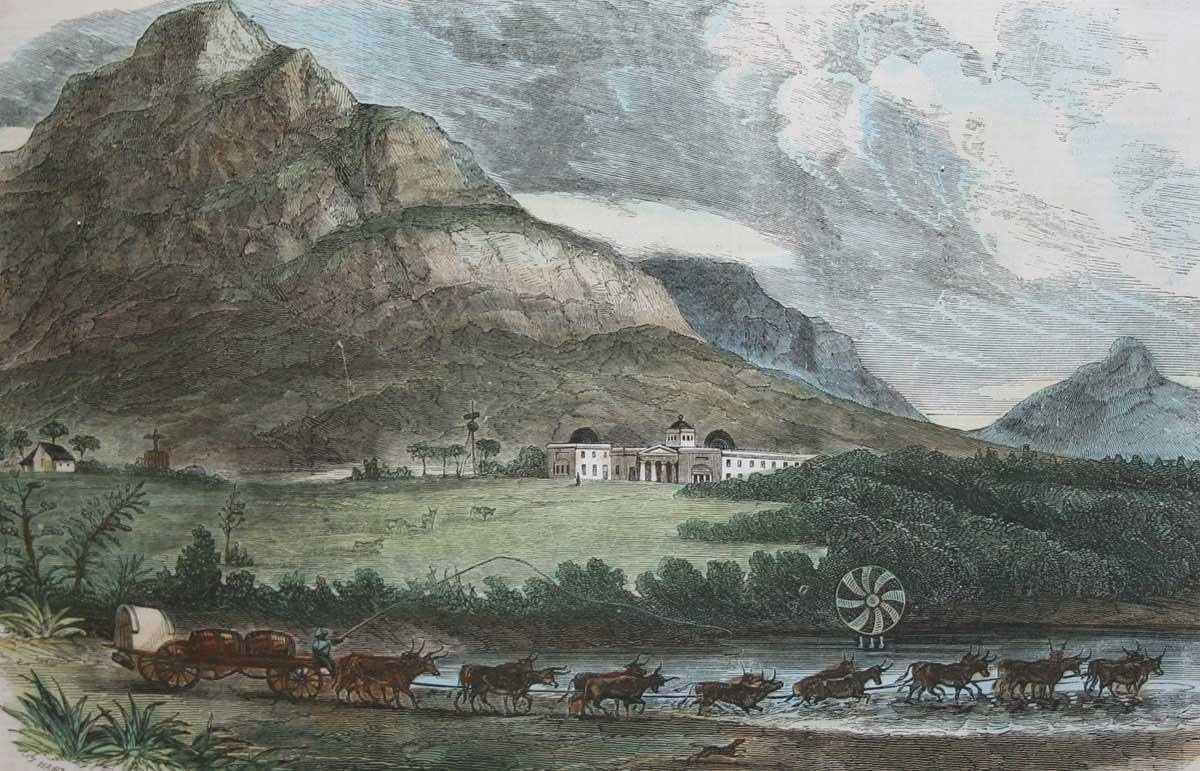
The Observatory in 1857.

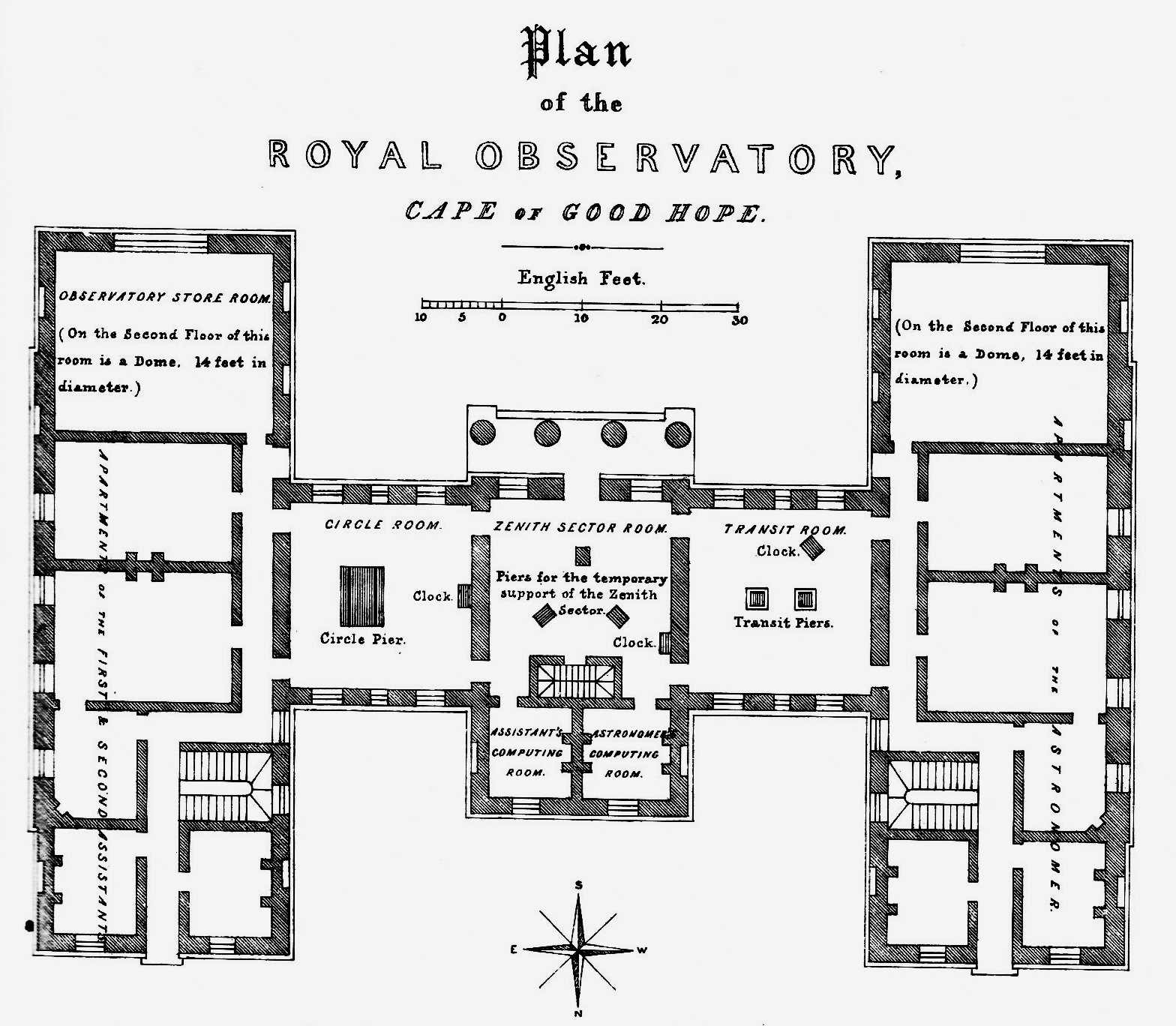
Plan of the Royal Observatory building, ca 1840.

The proposal for a Southern observatory in all likelihood originated among the same group of people who founded the Royal Astronomical Society in the United Kingdom. The official establishment of the Royal Observatory, Cape of Good Hope occurred on 20 October 1820 through an Order in Council of King George IV of the United Kingdom. It remained a separate entity until 1972 when it was amalgamated with the Republic Observatory Johannesburg to form the present-day South African Astronomical Observatory. Its site is now the headquarters of the South African Astronomical Observatory.

In accordance with its mandate, the principal activity of the Observatory was astrometry, and it was over its existence responsible for publishing many catalogues of star positions. In the 20th century it turned in part towards astrophysics, but by the nineteen-fifties the city lights of Cape Town had rendered work on faint objects impossible and a new site in the Karoo semi-desert was sought. An agreement to facilitate this was ratified on 23 September 1970. Nevertheless, several telescopes remained in operation until the 1990s. These are rarely made use of today except for public outreach events. Alan Cousins was the last serious observer to work from the Royal Observatory site.

The Royal Observatory was responsible for a number of significant events in the history of astronomy. The second HM Astronomer, Thomas Henderson, aided by his assistant, Lieutenant William Meadows, made the first observations that led to a believable stellar parallax, namely of Alpha Centauri. However, he lost priority as the discoverer of stellar parallax to Friedrich Wilhelm Bessel, who published his own (later) observations of 61 Cygni before Henderson got around to his.

Around 1840, Thomas Maclear re-measured the controversial meridian of Nicolas-Louis de La Caille, showing that the latter's geodetic measurements had been correct but that nearby mountains had affected his latitude determinations.

In 1882, David Gill obtained long-exposure photographs of the great comet of that year showing the presence of stars in the background. This led him to undertake in collaboration with J.C. Kapteyn of Groningen the Cape Photographic Durchmusterung, the first stellar catalogue prepared by photographic means. In 1886, he proposed to Admiral A.E.B. Mouchez of Paris Observatory the holding of an international congress to promote a photographic catalogue of the whole sky. In 1887 this congress took place in Paris and resulted in the Carte du Ciel project. The Cape Observatory was assigned the zone between declinations −40° and −52°. The Carte du Ciel is regarded as the precursor of the International Astronomical Union.

In 1897 Frank McClean, a close friend of Gill's and the donor of the McClean telescope, discovered the presence of oxygen in a number of stars using an objective prism attached to the Astrographic Telescope.

In 1911, J.K.E. Halm, then the Chief Assistant, put forward a pioneering paper on stellar dynamics in which he hypothesized that the star streams discovered by Kapteyn arose from a Maxwellian distribution of stellar velocities. This paper also contains the first suggestion that stars obey a mass-luminosity relationship.

A later 20th-century HM Astronomer, H. Spencer Jones, was active in an international project for determining the solar parallax through observations of the minor planet Eros.

In the second half of the twentieth century Alan Cousins set up very precise southern standards for UBV and introduced a widely used system of VRI photometry that enjoyed international recognition for precision.

In 1977 the occultation of the star SAO 158687 was observed by Joseph Churms from the former Royal Observatory, and these observations provided needed confirmation of the Uranian rings discovered from the Kuiper aeroplane by Elliot et al. During the 19th century the Observatory was regarded as the main advisor to the colonial government on scientific matters. it served as the repository for standard weights and measures of the Colony and was responsible for timekeeping and geodetic surveying. A magnetic observatory was constructed in 1841 but burned down during the following decade. The Observatory also possesses a long series of meteorological records.

The history of the Royal Observatory has been the subject of several works.

== Astronomers at the Cape ==
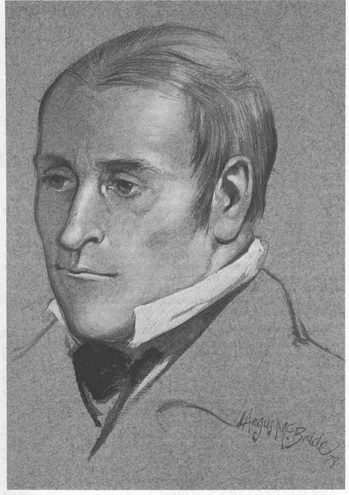
Thomas Henderson. His Majesty's Astronomer at the Cape, 1831–1833

The Royal Observatory's directors were known as His or Her Majesty's Astronomers at the Cape. They were as follows:

- The Revd Fearon Fallows 1820–1831
- Thomas Henderson 1831–1833
- Sir Thomas Maclear 1833–1879
- Edward James Stone 1870–1879
- David Gill 1879–1907
- Sydney Samuel Hough 1907–1923
- Harold Spencer Jones 1923–1933
- John Jackson 1933–1950
- Richard Hugh Stoy 1950–1968
- George Alfred Harding was Officer-in-charge 1969–1971

A full list of people who worked at the Royal Observatory and their publications, up to 1913, is given in Gill (1913). Other notable staff included:

- Charles Piazzi Smyth 1835–1845. Later Astronomer Royal for Scotland.
- William Lewis Elkin 1881–1883. Later director of Yale University Observatory.
- Frank McClean 1895–1897. Discoverer of oxygen in stars.
- Willem de Sitter 1897–1899. Later a famous cosmologist and director of Leiden Observatory.
- Robert Thorburn Ayton Innes 1897–1903. Discoverer of the nearest star and later director of the Union (Republic) Observatory
- Jakob Karl Ernst Halm 1907–1927. Discoverer of the mass-luminosity relation and pioneer of stellar dynamics.
- Joan George Erardus Gijsbertus Voûte. Later founder and director of Bosscha Observatory.
- Alan William James Cousins 1947–1971. Noted photometrist.
- David Stanley Evans 1951–1968. Known for Barnes-Evans relation.

== Principal buildings ==
A heritage survey was recorded in 2011 of a complete list of the buildings at the Observatory. They include:

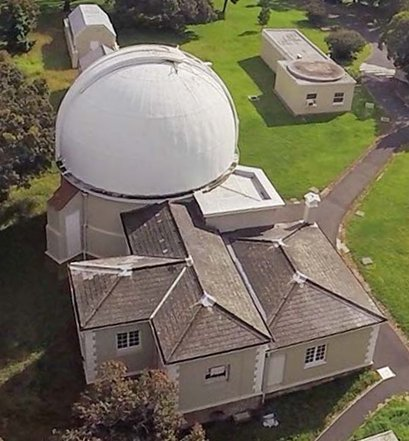
McClean building

- Main Building, completed 1828. Greek revival style; Architect John Rennie. This contains today offices and a notable astronomical library.
- Photoheliograph building, 1849 (formerly 7-inch Merz telescope building). Its dome rotates on cannonballs.
- Heliometer, 1888 (now containing 18-inch reflector). Its dome (by the Grubb Telescope Company) was designed for flow-through ventilation.
- McClean, 1896, designed by Herbert Baker and laboratory (now Astronomical Museum). Hydraulically driven rising floor. Dome by T. Cooke & Sons.
- Astrographic, 1889. Dome by the Grubb Telescope Company.
- Reversible Transit Circle 1905 (6-inch). Two each Collimator and Mark houses.
- Technical Building (ca 1987)
- Auditorium, constructed originally as an optical instrument repair workshop during World War II.

== Principal telescopes ==
Historically, the main building contained a 10 feet focal length Transit by Dollond and a 6-feet Mural Circle by Thomas Jones. These were replaced by in 1855 by an 8-inch Transit Circle designed by George Biddell Airy, Astronomer Royal at Greenwich. The Airy instrument was removed in 1950. Some parts of these telescopes are in the Observatory's Astronomical Museum.

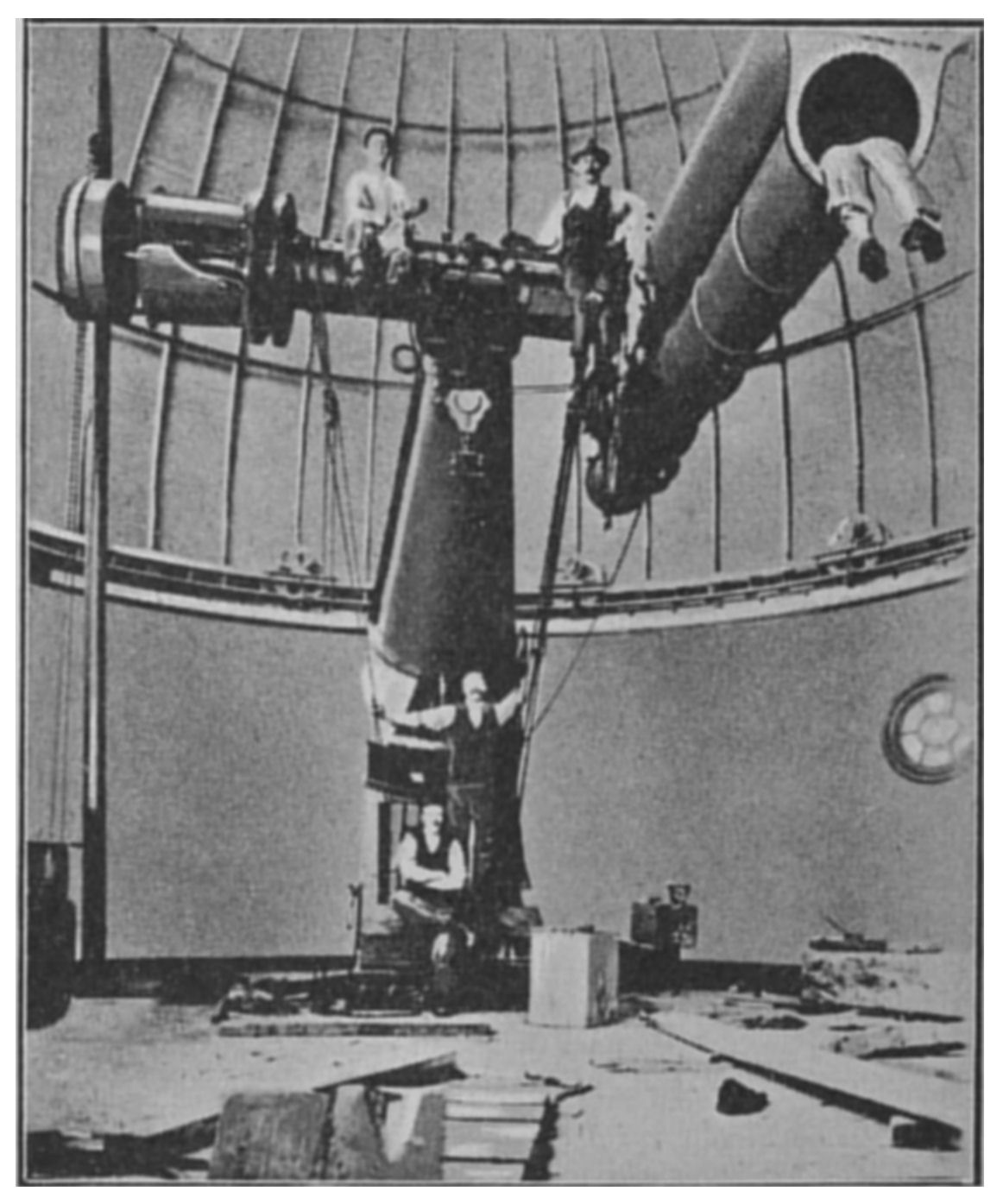
Victoria refractor

- 4-inch Photoheliograph (1875) by Dallmeyer
- 6-inch visual refractor (1882) by the Grubb Telescope Company
- Astrographic, 1889 (13-inch photographic and 10-inch guide refractors by the Grubb Telescope Company). Used for the Cape Astrographic Zone (see above) and by F. McClean for spectroscopy.
- McClean or Victoria telescope (18-inch visual, 24-inch photographic and 8-inch guide refractors by the Grubb Telescope Company)
- 6-inch Reversible Transit Circle 1905. Designed by Sir David Gill and constructed by Troughton & Simms. Used inter alia for the southern part of the Fundamental Katalog FK4.
- 18-inch reflector by Cox, Hargreaves and Thomson, 1955. Guide telescope is 7-inch Merz

A 40-inch reflector by Grubb Parsons was installed in 1964 but moved to Sutherland in 1972.

== Astronomical Museum ==
The former spectroscopic laboratory of the McClean telescope was converted into a museum in 1987, retaining the original 19th-century fittings. The building still contains the original hydraulic apparatus for raising the observing floor and a darkroom which contains specimens of darkroom equipment taken from various domes after photography went out of use. Items on display include telescope models, measuring machines, altazimuth instruments by Dollond (1820) and Bamberg (ca 1900), calculating machines, early office equipment, early electronic devices, lenses from early telescopes including the photographic telescopes of Gill, a clockwork telescope drive, a signal pistol, chemistry equipment etc.

== Natural history ==
The Royal Observatory site is situated in the Two Rivers Urban Park, a wetland area. The underlying rock is Malmesbury shale with a zone of greywacke and quartzitic limestone. Some of its original ecology is preserved and it supports a wide variety of animals and plant life. It is the northern limit of the Western Leopard Toad (Bufo Pantherinus) and the only remaining natural habitat of the rare iris, Moraea aristata.
