= Catalog of Stellar Identifications =

The Catalog of Stellar Identifications (CSI) is a star catalog which was constructed to facilitate cross-referencing between different star catalogs. It contains designations and basic data for, as of 1983, approximately 440,000 stars, and was created by merging the Smithsonian Astrophysical Observatory Star Catalog, the Henry Draper Catalogue, the AGK2/3, the Cape Photographic Catalogue, the Cape Zone Catalogue, the Yale Zone Catalogue, the Cape Catalogue of Faint Stars, and the Boss General Catalogue. It contains stellar coordinates, magnitudes, spectral types, proper motions, and cross-references to designations in the previously mentioned catalogs. It also gives cross-references to many other catalogues, such as the Index Catalogue of Visual Double Stars, which have been linked to the CSI. The CSI eventually became part of the SIMBAD stellar database.
