= Royal Observatory =

Royal Observatory may refer to:

- Royal Observatory, Greenwich in England (formerly the Royal Greenwich Observatory)
- Paris Observatory in France (formerly the Royal Observatory, France)
- Royal Observatory of Belgium
- Royal Observatory, Edinburgh in Scotland
- Hong Kong Observatory, (formerly the Royal Observatory, Hong Kong until 1997)
- Royal Observatory, Cape of Good Hope in South Africa
