= V345 Carinae =

Star in the constellation Carina

- Location of V345 Carinae (circled in red)

Observation data Epoch J2000 Equinox ICRS
- Constellation: Carina
- Right ascension: 09^{h} 05^{m} 38.37267^{s}
- Declination: −70° 32′ 18.5832″
- Apparent magnitude (V): 4.67 to 4.78

Characteristics
- Spectral type: B2(IV)n
- B−V color index: −0.149±0.011
- Variable type: Be

Astrometry
Radial velocity (R_{v})	+19.0±7.4 km/s
Proper motion (μ)	RA: −3.017 mas/yr Dec.: +8.394 mas/yr
Parallax (π)	3.2440±0.2602 mas
Distance	1,010 ± 80 ly (310 ± 20 pc)
Absolute magnitude (M_{V})	−2.67

Details
Mass	9.6±0.3 M_{☉}
Radius	8.70±0.17 R_{☉}
Luminosity	2,539.73 L_{☉}
Surface gravity (log g)	3.80±0.04 cgs
Temperature	19,000±190 K
Rotational velocity (v sin i)	140±3 km/s
Age	20.4±2.3 Myr

Other designations
- E Car, V345 Car, CPD−70°861, GC 12602, HD 78764, HIP 44626, HR 3642, SAO 256583

Database references
SIMBAD	data

V345 Carinae is a star in the constellation Carina. It has the Bayer designation E Carinae; V345 Carinae is the variable star designation. The star has a blue-white hue and is faintly visible to the naked eye with an apparent visual magnitude that fluctuates around +4.7. Its actual brightness varies from magnitude +4.67 to +4.78 with a period of 137.7 days. Based on parallax measurements, it is located at a distance of approximately 1,010 light years from the Sun. It is drifting further away with a radial velocity of around +19 km/s.

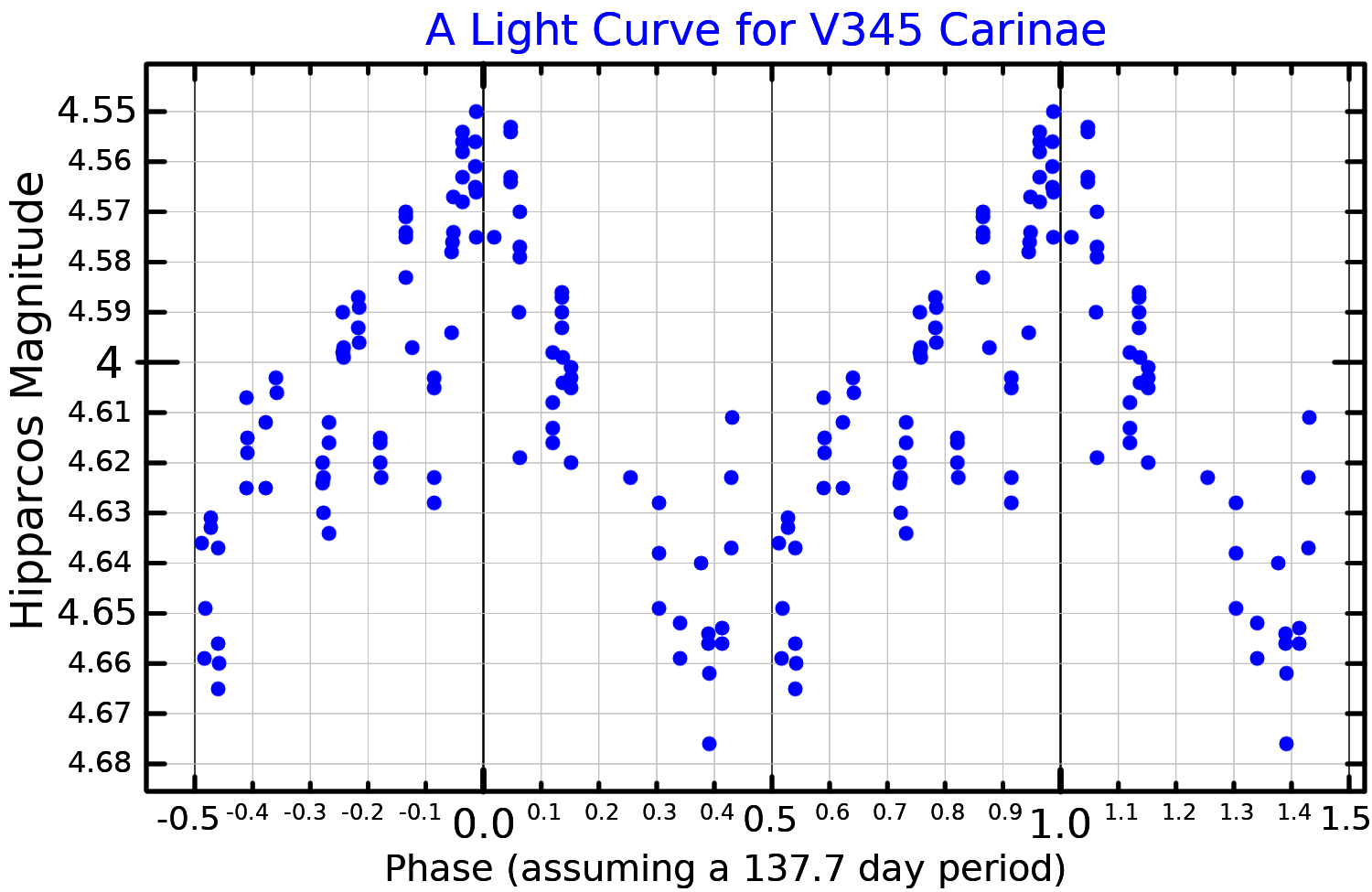
A light curve for V345 Carinae, plotted from Hipparcos data

This star has a stellar classification of B2(IV)n, matching a suspected B-type subgiant star. The 'n' notation indicates "nebulous" lines caused by rapid rotation: the star is spinning with a projected rotational velocity of 140 km/s. It is a Be star having a circumstellar disk of hot, decreted gas that is inserting emission lines into the spectrum. The star is 20 million years old with 9.6 times the mass of the Sun and 8.7 times the Sun's radius. It is radiating 2,540 times the luminosity of the Sun from its photosphere at an effective temperature of 19,000 K.

Alan William James Cousins announced that the star's brightness showed signs of variability, in 1959. It was given its variable star designation in 1975. The star displays a complex luminosity variation with a periods of 1.13028 and 137.7 days. Although thought to be a single star, Carrier et al. (2002) suggested the longer period may be caused by some sort of binary interaction with the circumstellar disk or perhaps a light reflecting effect. However, no companion has been detected via radial velocity variations. This suggests that the companion would need to either have less than 1.7 times the mass of the Sun or it is being viewed from nearly pole-on. The short-term variations may be from non-radial pulsations similar to those of ω CMa.
