= John Jackson (astronomer) =

Scottish astronomer

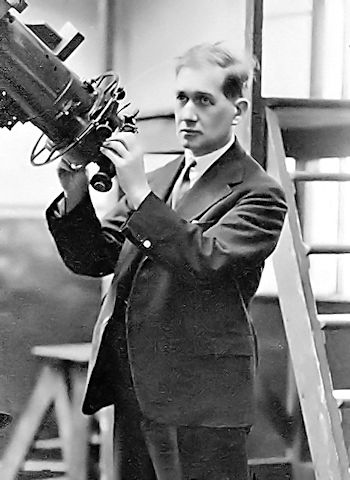
John Jackson (1887-1958), British astronomer

John Jackson (11 February 1887 – 9 December 1958) was a Scottish astronomer.

He was awarded The Gold Medal of the Royal Astronomical Society for his work on stellar parallaxes and star positions.

== Early life and education ==
Born on 11 February 1887 at Mossvale Street, Paisley, Renfrewshire, Scotland, John Jackson was educated at Paisley Grammar School, studying a range of subjects including the sciences and French and German, but not Latin or Greek, which were compulsory if he intended to sit the entrance examinations for university.

Having excelled at science, in particular chemistry, he decided to try for the entrance exam for Glasgow University in spite of not studying the classics. During the summer of 1903 he studied hard to improve his knowledge of Latin, which saw him pass the university entrance exam sufficiently well to be awarded a £25 bursary.

Graduating in 1907 with a first class honours Master of Arts degree in mathematics and natural philosophy, he was then awarded a fellowship of £100 a year for further study. The following year he undertook a Bachelor of Science degree, again at Glasgow University, with special distinction in mathematics, natural philosophy, astronomy and chemistry, winning medals in most of these subjects.

Astronomy was studied under the tutelage of Ludwig Becker. Jackson gained a thorough grounding in the fundamental elements of the subject to the extent required for a complete understanding of astronomy. He learned how to use a variety of astronomical instruments, how to correct observations and how to apply mathematical and arithmetical analysis to solve astronomical problems. Becker's enthusiastic teaching methods must have had a profound influence on Jackson as he then chose to pursue a career in astronomy.

As there seemed to be no possibility of obtaining an appointment in astronomy at Glasgow, Jackson decided to go to Cambridge University, and, after taking the entrance exam, was awarded a major scholarship to study at Trinity College as an ordinary undergraduate in 1909. He already knew as much spherical and dynamic astronomy as was then taught at Cambridge, but was introduced to new subjects including solar physics and astrophysics, whilst also furthering his knowledge of pure and applied mathematics. During his time at Cambridge he was awarded further medals for his work in astronomy.

== Greenwich Observatory ==
In 1914 a vacancy as Chief Assistant arose at the Royal Observatory Greenwich and Jackson was selected by the Astronomer Royal, Sir Frank Watson Dyson. During a Zeppelin raid on London Jackson was in the observatory grounds studying the Moon. Urged to take shelter from the bombs by Dyson, Jackson is reported to have said 'the observatory was built to observe the Moon, and I am going to observe the Moon'.

In 1917 Jackson was granted a commission in the Royal Engineers. He was sent to France to work on sound ranging, but in the spring of 1918, after the German armies breakthrough and advances, he was sent to the British Fourth Army as a trigonometrical survey officer, plotting artillery trajectories. His experience of observing and his knowledge of spherical astronomy meant he was suitably qualified to carry out this work, even resorting to observations of the Sun to help determine ranges and positions.

Jackson returned from France in 1919 and resumed his duties at Greenwich. The first extensive task he undertook was to prepare for publication all of the observations he had made of double stars, working on this with Herbert Hall Turner, the Savilian Professor of Astronomy at Oxford University. Jackson also worked on calculating the rotation of the planet Neptune revising the accepted notion of a 7-hour rotation to 19 hours with a possible error of 20 per cent, not too far from the true figure of 15.8 hours.

== Cape Observatory ==
In 1933 a vacancy arose for the position of His Majesty's Astronomer at Royal Observatory, Cape of Good Hope, South Africa. Jackson was appointed to the post.

Jackson's first task on arrival at the Cape was to work on the large collection of photographic plates taken by David Gill of the sky above Cape Town, in order to derive the proper motions of these stars. He published these in two volumes, which covered the motions and spectral types of over 41,000 stars.

Most of Jackson's time at the Cape was taken up with the determination of stellar parallax, a programme that had been started by his predecessor, Harold Spencer Jones. Jackson worked on this for a number of years, taking as many as 1000 photographic plates of the sky in a year from which to work from. Jackson obtained results for 1600 stars, published in three volumes of the Cape Annals. As a result of his work the knowledge of stellar parallaxes for the southern hemisphere became better known than that of the northern.

Throughout his career Jackson took part in four expeditions to observe a total eclipse of the Sun. The Greenwich observatory had planned to send an expedition to South Africa to observe the eclipse of 1 October 1940, but the outbreak of the Second World War made it impossible to send observers. Equipment was sent instead and Jackson took charge of an expedition from the Cape Observatory to the observing site, where the total eclipse was successfully viewed.

== Awards and legacy ==
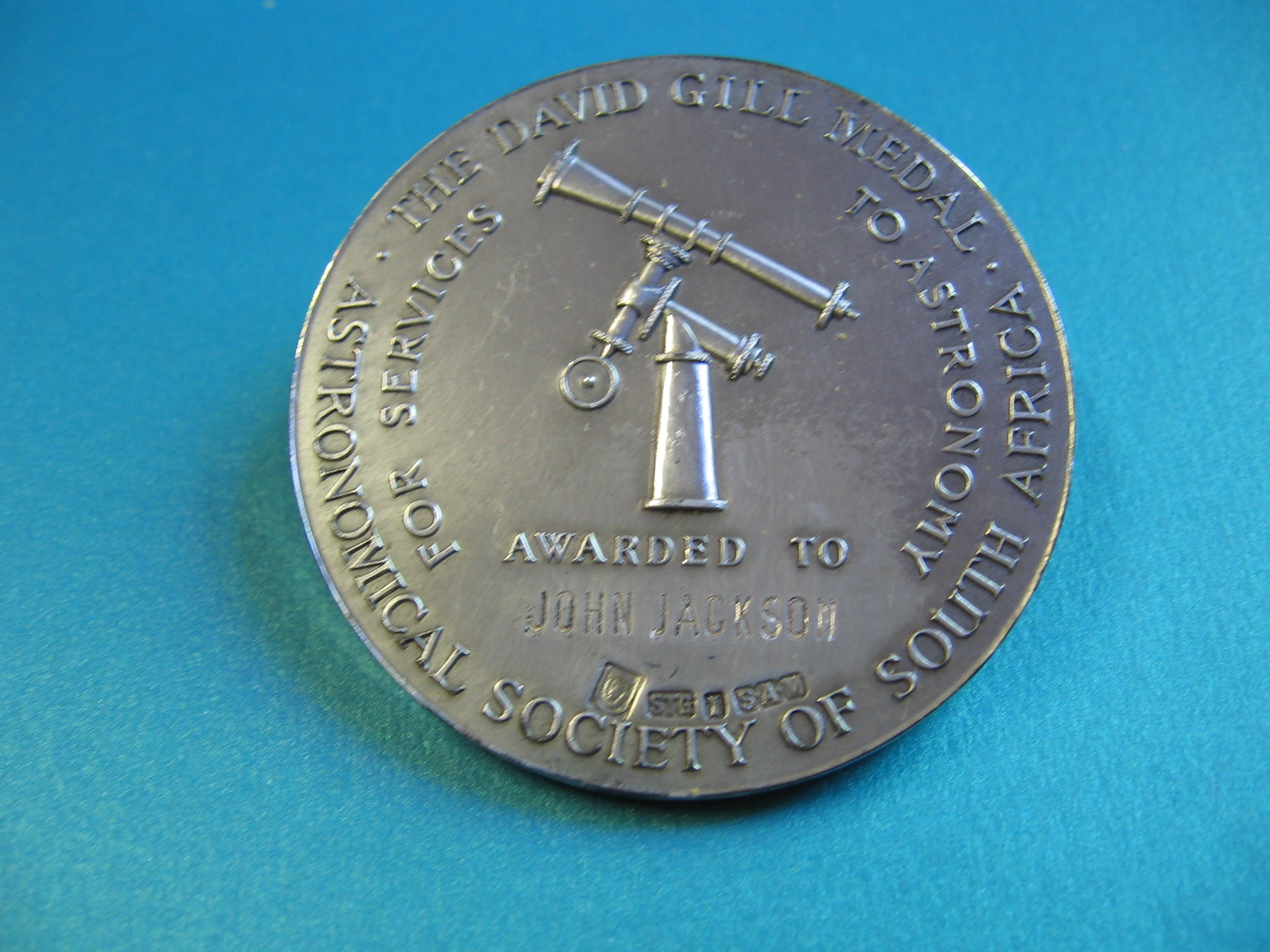
Gill Medal awarded to John Jackson by the Astronomical Society of South Africa

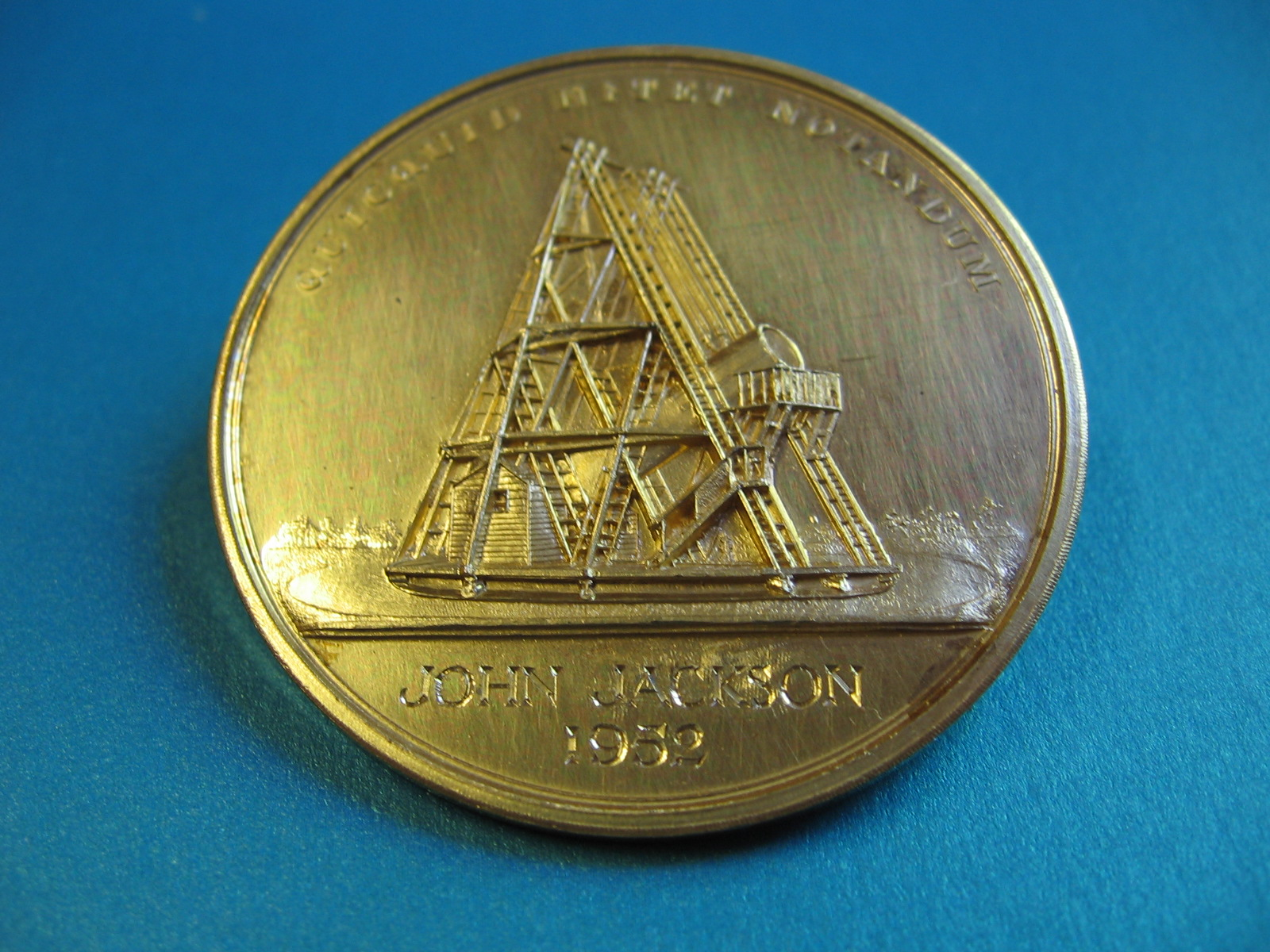
Gold Medal of the Royal Astronomical Society awarded to John Jackson

Jackson retired from the Cape Observatory in 1950, being replaced by his assistant Dr R. H. Stoy.

He returned to England, where he settled with his wife, Mary Beatrice Marshall, in Ewell, Surrey. In 1952 John Jackson was awarded The Gold Medal of the Royal Astronomical Society for his work on stellar parallaxes and his contributions to the general problems of star positions and proper motions. Further accolades awarded include the Gill Medal of the Astronomical Society of Southern Africa in 1958 and he was made a CBE in 1950. He held the posts of President of the Royal Society of South Africa in 1949 and was President of the Royal Astronomical Society from 1953 to 1955. After retiring he did not leave his passion for astronomy behind, making a trip to Stromatad in Sweden to observe the total eclipse of 30 June 1954. Many of Jackson's medals held at Coats Observatory, Paisley, having been donated to the observatory by Paisley Grammar School. The crater Jackson on the far side of the Moon is named after him.

Ill health plagued his later years and on 9 December 1958 John Jackson died after a brief illness.
