= Jackson (crater) =

Lunar impact crater

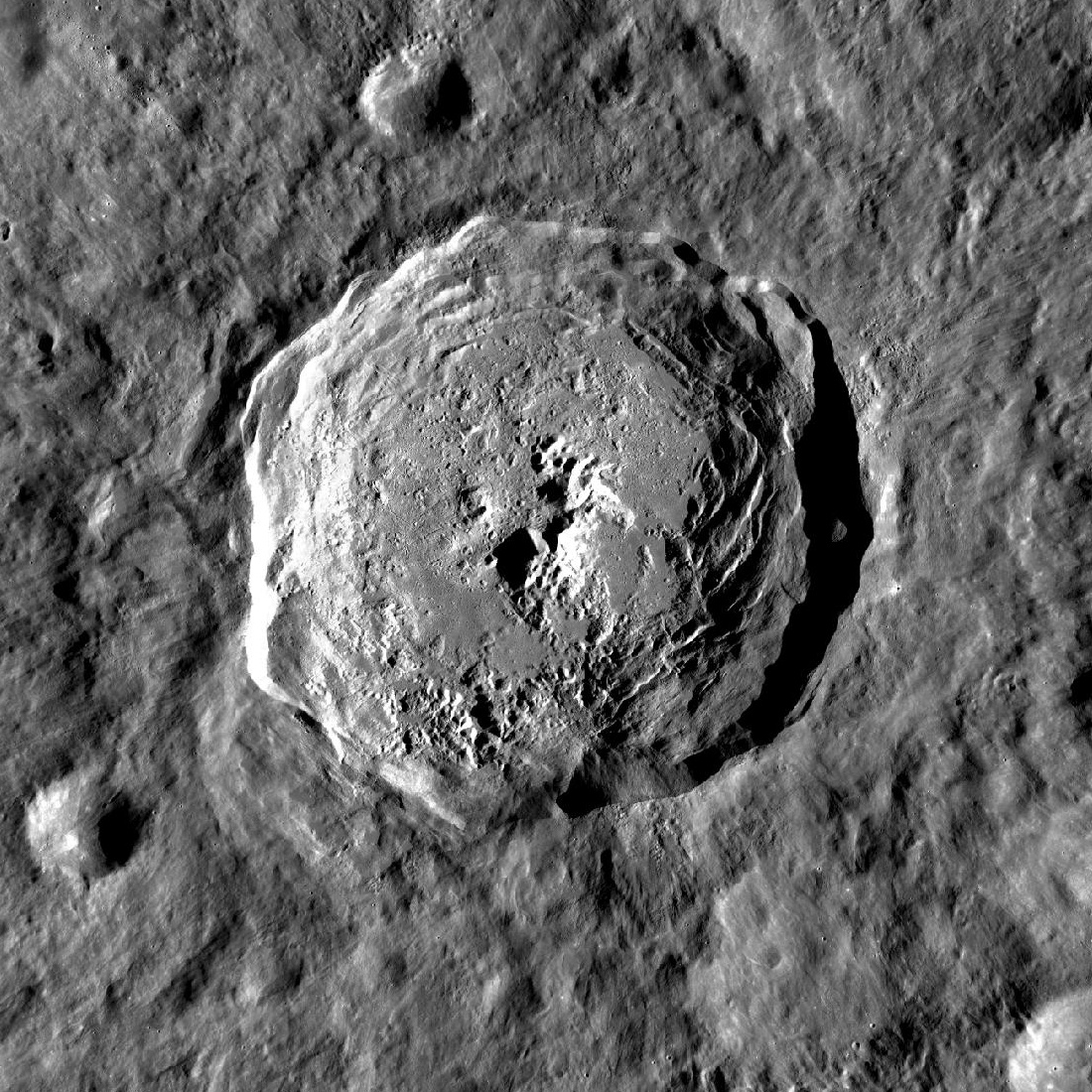
- LRO WAC image
- Coordinates: 22.4°N 163.1°W
- Diameter: 71.3 km
- Depth: Unknown
- Colongitude: 164° at sunrise
- Formation: Compernican
- Eponym: John Jackson

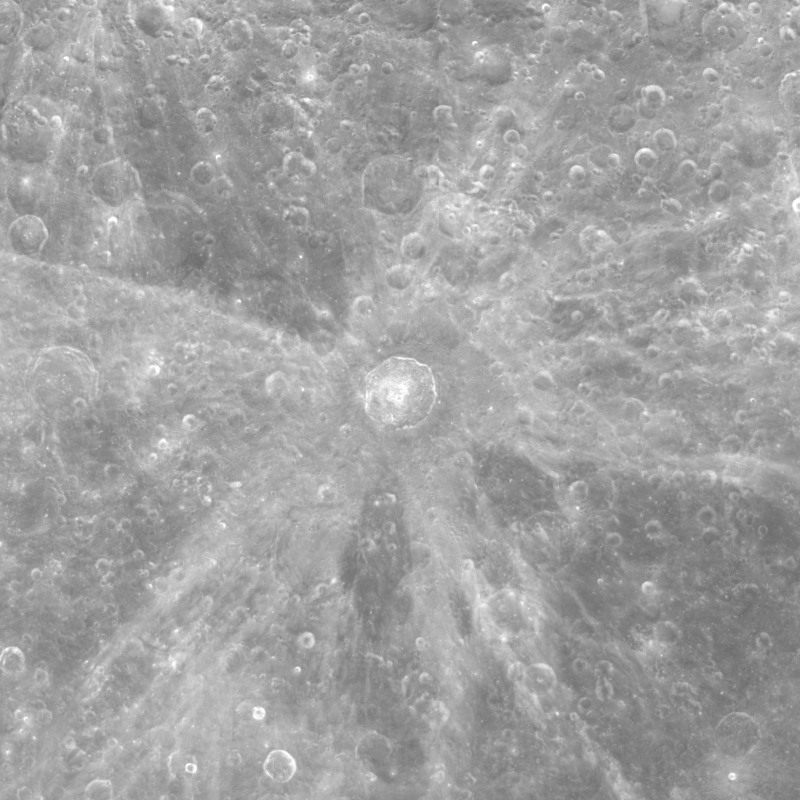
Clementine mosaic showing much of the extent of the ray system. The image width is approximately 800 km.

Jackson is a prominent lunar impact crater that is located in the northern hemisphere on the far side of the Moon. It is named after Scottish astronomer John Jackson. Prior to formal naming in 1970 by the IAU, this crater was known as Crater 144.

This formation is less than 150 million years old, and so dates to the Compernican period of the lunar geologic timescale. It created a large ray system. A skirt of higher-albedo material covers the surface within one crater diameter, with a slightly darker band along the outer ramparts. Beyond that radius, the rays form wide sections that grow increasingly diffuse and wispy with distance. The largest sections lie in roughly 90° arcs to the northeast and southwest, while a narrower arc projects to the south-southeast. The rays continue for hundreds of kilometers across the surface.

The rim of the crater is well-defined and not significantly worn. The edge is somewhat polygonal in shape, with the southeastern rim being more rounded. The inner walls display some terracing. The interior floor is generally level with some irregularities in the northeastern part. Parts of the floor have a relatively high albedo. Anorthosite with a very low mafic abundance has been detected in the central peaks. The infrared spectrum of pure crystalline plagioclase has been identified on the central peak, as well as the floor, and the east and west parts of the crater wall.

Less than one crater to the northeast is the crater Mineur, and to the south-southwest lies McMath. It lies to the northwest of the Dirichlet-Jackson Basin.

== Satellite craters ==
By convention these features are identified on lunar maps by placing the letter on the side of the crater midpoint that is closest to Jackson.

Jackson	Latitude	Longitude	Diameter
Q	21.1° N	164.7° W	13 km
X	25.2° N	164.3° W	17 km
