= Joan Voûte =

Dutch astronomer (1879–1963)

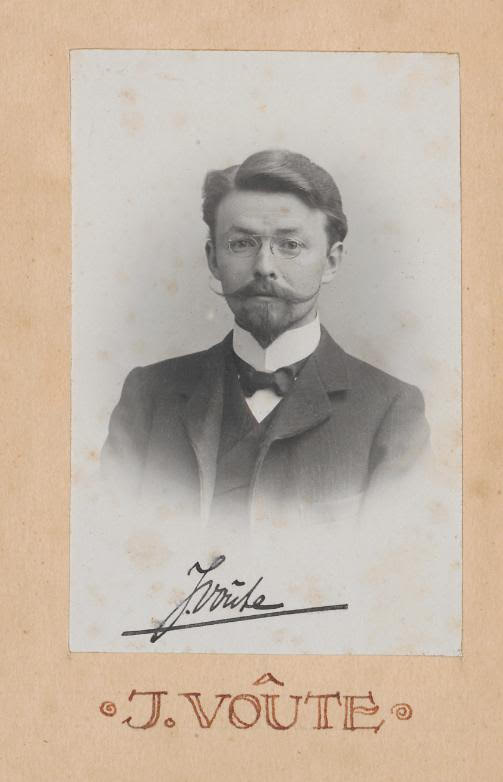
Joan Voûte (c.1908)

Joan George Erardus Gijsbertus Voûte (7 June 1879 – 20 August 1963) was a Dutch astronomer.

He was born in Madioen, Java to a Huguenot family. He studied civil engineering at Delft, but while a student he developed an interest in astronomy—studying variable stars. After graduating he joined the staff of the Leiden Observatory, where he worked on binary stars. In 1913 he gained a post at the Cape Observatory in South Africa, where he worked on double stars and parallax measurements. He became a Fellow of the Royal Astronomical Society in 1917 (and was re-elected in 1953 after his membership lapsed during the war). His preliminary account of the parallax of Proxima Centauri was published in 1917, demonstrating that Proxima was the same distance from the Sun as the Alpha Centauri system.

He returned to Java in 1919, where he served as an assistant at the Weltevreden meteorological and magnetic observatory. There he was able to gain the interest of wealthy friends for the construction of an observatory. Voûte became the Director, and he selected the 1,300 m altitude Lembang for the site. The main instrument was a 60 cm Zeiss double refractor. The work of the observatory focused on double stars, parallax measurements, photometry of variable stars and clusters, and so forth. The results were published in the Lembang Observatory Annals.

Following the Japanese occupation of Java, Voûte was imprisoned. As a result of his captivity he suffered from poor health, so after the war he moved to Australia. Later he settled in The Hague, the Netherlands, where he died in 1963.

Voûte became a corresponding member of the Royal Netherlands Academy of Arts and Sciences in 1922, he resigned in 1951.
