= HD 73390 =

Binary star system in the constellation Carina

Observation data Epoch J2000.0 Equinox ICRS
- Constellation: Carina
- Right ascension: 08^{h} 35^{m} 15.55529^{s}
- Declination: −58° 13′ 29.0604″
- Apparent magnitude (V): 5.25 + 8.90

Characteristics
- Evolutionary stage: main sequence
- Spectral type: B4V
- B−V color index: −0.133±0.005

Astrometry
Radial velocity (R_{v})	21.0±4.2 km/s
Proper motion (μ)	RA: −21.925 mas/yr Dec.: +11.574 mas/yr
Parallax (π)	3.9800±0.0752 mas
Distance	820 ± 20 ly (251 ± 5 pc)
Absolute magnitude (M_{V})	−1.91

Details

A
Mass	7.0±0.4 M_{☉}
Radius	3.9 R_{☉}
Luminosity	1159.86 L_{☉}
Surface gravity (log g)	4.5 cgs
Temperature	16,571±306 K
Rotational velocity (v sin i)	155 km/s
Age	36.1±11.0 Myr

B
Mass	0.9+0.04 −0.02 M_{☉}
Temperature	5,241±158 K
Metallicity [Fe/H]	-0.5 dex
Rotational velocity (v sin i)	10 km/s

Other designations
- e01 Car, BD−57°1590, GC 11796, HD 73390, HIP 42129, HR 3415, SAO 236105, CCDM J08353-5813, WDS J08353-5813

Database references
SIMBAD	data

HD 73390, also called e^{1} Carinae, is a binary star system in the constellation Carina. It is approximately 870 light years from Earth. The primary is a blue-white B-type main sequence dwarf with an apparent magnitude of +5.27. It displays an infrared excess and is a candidate host of an orbiting debris disk. The secondary is a magnitude 8.9 star which has a mass and temperature similar to the Sun.
