= HD 73389 =

Binary star system in the constellation Carina

- Location of HD 73389 (circled in red)

Observation data Epoch J2000 Equinox ICRS
- Constellation: Carina
- Right ascension: 08^{h} 35^{m} 19.70886^{s}
- Declination: −58° 00′ 33.2714″
- Apparent magnitude (V): +4.84 (5.08 + 8.02)

Characteristics
- Spectral type: K0III
- B−V color index: 0.981±0.041

Astrometry
Radial velocity (R_{v})	+25.62±0.13 km/s
Proper motion (μ)	RA: +52.848 mas/yr Dec.: +28.117 mas/yr
Parallax (π)	14.5139±0.2692 mas
Distance	225 ± 4 ly (69 ± 1 pc)
Absolute magnitude (M_{V})	0.68

Details

A
Radius	11.13+1.11 −0.39 R_{☉}
Luminosity	64.4±1.4 L_{☉}
Temperature	4,903+87 −229 K

Other designations
- e^{2} Car, CPD−57°1591, GC 11797, HD 73389, HIP 42134, HR 3414, SAO 236106, CCDM J08353-5801

Database references
SIMBAD	data

HD 73389 is a binary star system in the constellation Carina. It has the Bayer designation e^{2} Carinae; HD 73389 is the identifier from the Henry Draper Catalogue. This system is visible to the naked eye as a point of light with a combined apparent visual magnitude of +4.84. Based on parallax measurements, it is located at a distance of approximately 225 light years from the Sun. The system is drifting further away with a radial velocity of +25.6 km/s.

The visual magnitude 5.08 primary, component A, is an aging K-type giant star with a stellar classification of K0III. With the supply of hydrogen at its core exhausted, it has cooled and expanded to 11 times the Sun's radius. It is radiating 64 times the luminosity of the Sun from its enlarged photosphere at an effective temperature of 4,903 K. The secondary companion, component B, has a visual magnitude of 8.02 and is located at an angular separation of 0.30″ along a position angle of 207° from the primary, as of 2015.
