= SAAO Library =

Library of the South African Astronomical Observatory

Coordinates: 33.9344152202°S 18.477526634°E

Location SAAO Library in Cape Town.

The SAAO Library is the national library of the South African Astronomical Observatory (SAAO) for astronomy and space science located in Observatory, Cape Town, South Africa. Its primary function is to conduct fundamental research in astronomy and astrophysics. The SAAO library can be seen as the integral part of the facility as it provides the research staff with access to essential information and tools that allow them to function as informed professionals within their community.

The SAAO library is part of the larger National Research Foundation (NRF) therefore the library has to align its strategic actions with those of the NRF. Any strategic actions adopted by the library have to contribute also the NRF's strategic directions and should assist in achieving the NRF's corporate goals.

== History ==
The SAAO library is the oldest and most comprehensive astronomical library in South Africa, with contemporary material that dates back to 1830. The early SAAO library was formed of group of books that were housed in the astronomers offices.

== Branches ==
The SAAO library has two branches, Cape Town and in Sutherland in the Northern Cape. Cape Town branch acts as the main branch hosting most of the research material while Sutherland is the sub-branch used as reference for researchers during observations periods.

== Library holdings ==
The library's online catalogue was started in 1993 and since 2004 the library personnel have been engaged in retrospective cataloguing. The online catalogue currently gives access to over 9000 records and approximately 3100 staff publications. The library's holdings consists of journals (electronic and print), books (electronic and print), databases, atlases and catalogues, brochures, maps photographs, plates, posters, staff publications, slides, media collections, CD's / DVD's and many historic documents.
