= R. H. Stoy =

British astronomer

Richard Hugh Stoy CBE FRSE FRSSAS FRAS (1910–1994) was a 20th-century British astronomer remembered for his work in South Africa.

== Life ==
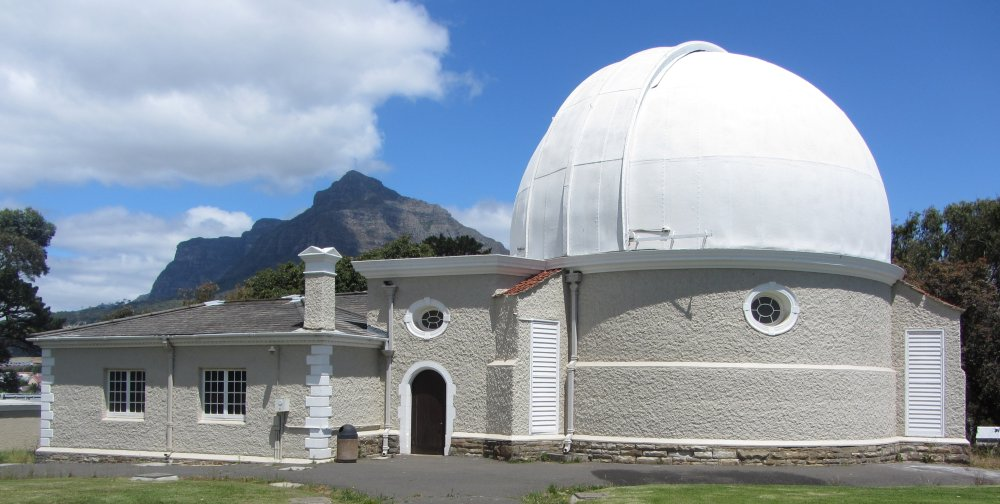
The old Cape Observatory

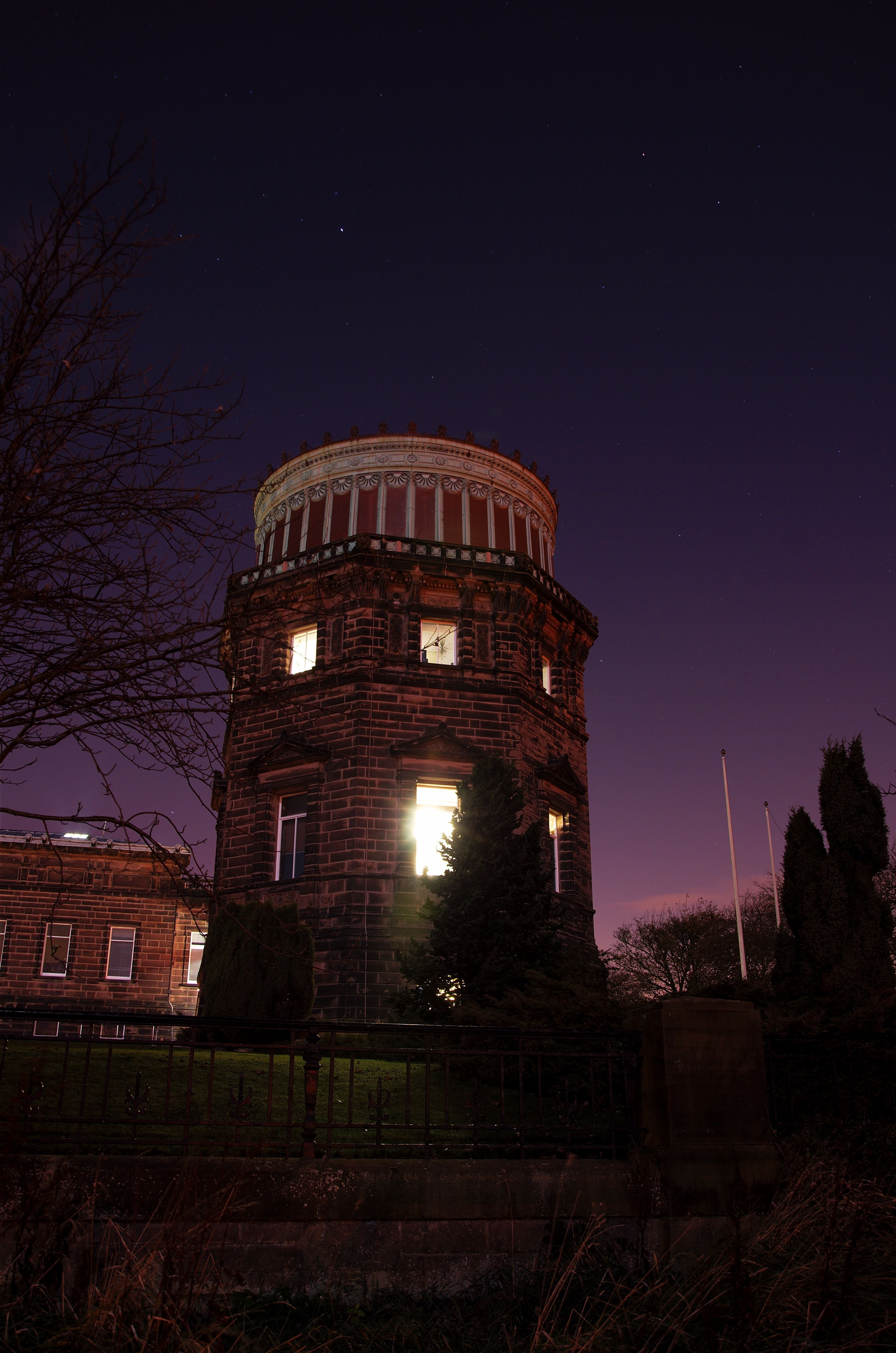
Edinburgh Observatory at night

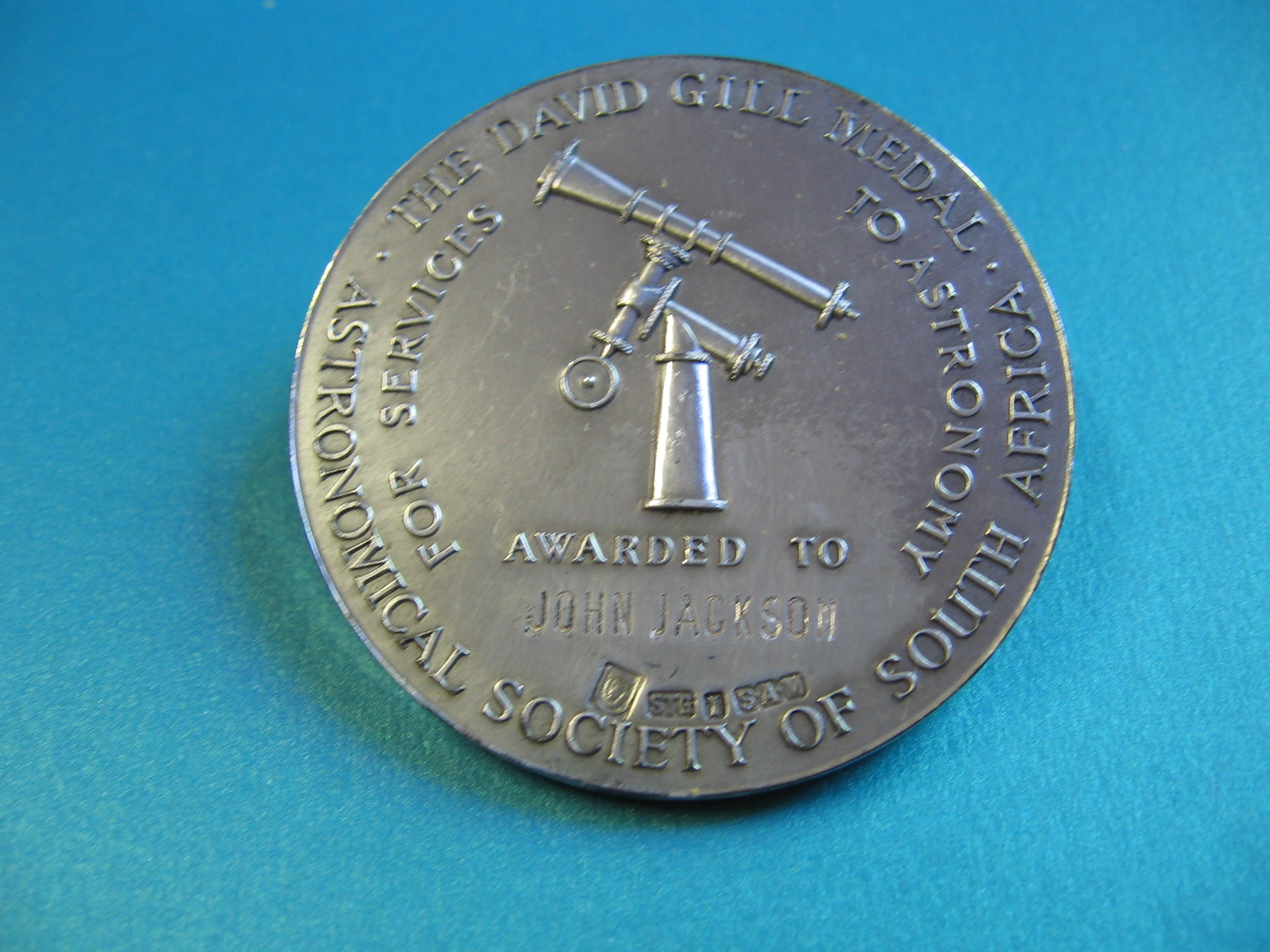
The Gill Medal awarded by the Astronomical Society of South Africa

He was born in Wolverhampton on 31 January 1910 the fifth child of Hugh Victor Stephen Stoy and his wife, Ellen Frances Channing. He was educated at Wolverhampton Grammar School, where his maths teacher, Mr Buckley, introduced him to astronomy.

He won a place at Gonville and Caius College, Cambridge and studied Astronomy under Prof Arthur Eddington and Prof F. J. M. Stratton. He was taught photographic photometry by Roderick Oliver Redman. He received his first doctorate (PhD) around 1924 then spent some time at Lick Observatory under a Commonwealth Scholarship.

In 1935 he was appointed Chief Assistant to John Jackson at the Cape Observatory. He rose to be Director in 1950 and was HM Astronomer for the Cape. He was President of the Astronomical Society of South Africa 1945/6 and won their Gill Medal in 1965. He was created a Commander of the Order of the British Empire in 1957.

In 1968 he moved to Edinburgh as deputy director of the Edinburgh Observatory. In 1970 he was elected a Fellow of the Royal Society of Edinburgh. His proposers were Hugh A. Bruck, D. W. N. Stibbs, M. J. Smyth and Hugh Ernest Butler.

He retired in 1975 and, following a year-long illness, died in Edinburgh on 8 November 1994. His funeral service was held in St Mark's Unitarian Church on Castle Terrace.

== Family ==
In 1940 in Cape Town he married Mary Brown Johnston, a local teacher. They had three children. One daughter Frances Anne Stoy, son Robert Adrian Stoy and a daughter Georgina Violet Stoy (Guille).

== Publications ==
- Everyman's Astronomy (1974)
