= Mineur (crater) =

Crater on the Moon

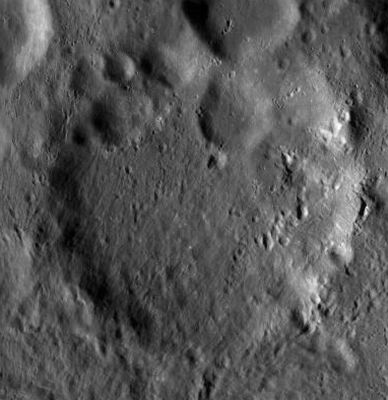
- LRO WAC image
- Coordinates: 25.0°N 161.3°W
- Diameter: 73 km
- Depth: Unknown
- Colongitude: 162° at sunrise
- Eponym: Henri Mineur

Mineur is a lunar impact crater that lies just to the northeast of the prominent crater Jackson on the far side of the Moon. Jackson lies at the center of a broad ray system, a portion of which covers Mineur. The closest other crater of note is Cockcroft to the north.

This is a heavily eroded crater formation, with a worn rim that stands in contrast to the well-defined features of Jackson. The northern part of the rim in particular has been heavily damaged by multiple overlapping impacts. The interior floor of Mineur is relatively featureless.

== Satellite craters ==
By convention these features are identified on lunar maps by placing the letter on the side of the crater midpoint that is closest to Mineur.

Mineur	Latitude	Longitude	Diameter
D	25.9° N	159.2° W	20 km
V	26.2° N	163.1° W	26 km
X	27.1° N	162.7° W	31 km
