= Henri Mineur =

French astronomer and mathematician

Henri Mineur (7 March 1899 – 7 May 1954) was a French astronomer and mathematician.

He was born in Lille. In 1917 he applied for the École Normale Supérieure and placed first in his class, but he decided to serve in the army during World War I. Following the war he received his degree in 1921. In addition to studying for a graduate degree, he taught mathematics in Düsseldorf. He received his Ph.D. in 1924.

As he had held a long interest in astronomy, in 1925 he left his teaching position to join the Paris Observatory. During his astronomy career he made a number of notable contributions. He observed the variation of star movements based on their distance from the core of a galaxy. He also found that there were globular clusters in the galaxy orbiting in a retrograde direction. He also discovered an important error in the period-luminosity law of Cepheid variables, that had resulted in a significant underestimation of the size of the universe.

In 1936 he established the Institute d'Astrophysique in Paris. He became the director of this facility and remained at this post for the rest of his life.

During World War II he served in the French resistance against Nazi occupation, risking his life on a number of occasions. Following the war he developed bad health around 1950, and suffered heart and liver problems up until his death. He died in Paris, France.

The crater Mineur on the Moon is named in his memory.

== Bibliography ==
- L'Univers en expansion, 1933.
- Technique de la méthodes des moindres carrés, 1938.
- Technique de calcul numérique, 1952.
