= South African Astronomical Observatory =

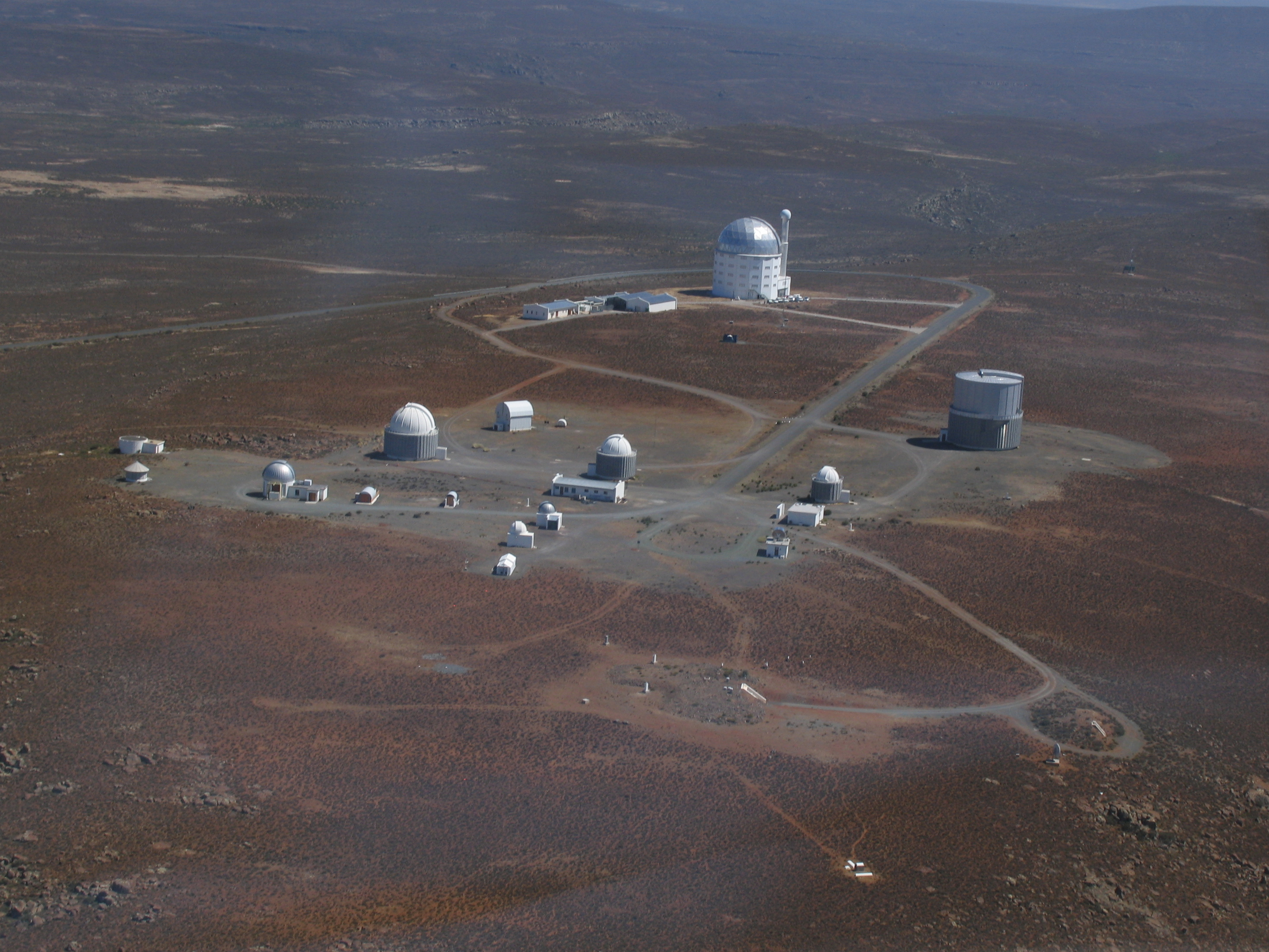
- The Sutherland site of the South African Astronomical Observatory. With the Southern African Large Telescope
- Alternative names: SAAO
- Organization: National Research Foundation of South Africa
- Observatory code: 51, B31, A60, L66
- Location: Headquarters in Observatory, Cape Town; Major telescopes in Sutherland, Northern Cape
- Coordinates: Headquarters: 33.9347°S 18.4776°E; Sutherland: 32.3783°S 20.8105°E
- Established: 20 October 1820; 206 years ago - As the Royal Observatory Cape of Good Hope; 1972; 54 years ago - As the South African Astronomical Observatory
- Website: saao.ac.za

Telescopes
- SALT: 11m reflector
- 1.9m: 1.9m reflector
- Infrared Survey Facility: 1.4m reflector
- MONET: 1.2m reflector
- 1.0m: 1m reflector
- SuperWASP-South: 8x Canon 200mm f/1.8
- ACT: 75 cm reflector
- Solaris-1: 0.5m f/15 Ritchey–Chrétien
- Solaris-1: 0.5m f/15 Ritchey–Chrétien
- MeerLICHT: 0.6m f/5.5 modified Dall-Kirkham telescope
- Related media on Commons

The South African Astronomical Observatory (SAAO) is the national centre for optical and infrared astronomy in South Africa. It was established in 1972. The observatory is run by the National Research Foundation of South Africa. The facility's function is to conduct research in astronomy and astrophysics. The primary telescopes are located in Sutherland, which is 370 kilometres (230 mi) from Observatory, Cape Town, where the headquarters is located.

The SAAO has links worldwide for scientific and technological collaboration. Instrumental contributions from the South African Astronomical Observatory include the development of a spherical aberration corrector and the Southern African Large Telescope (SALT).

The Noon Gun on Cape Town's Signal Hill is fired remotely by a time signal from the Observatory.

== History ==
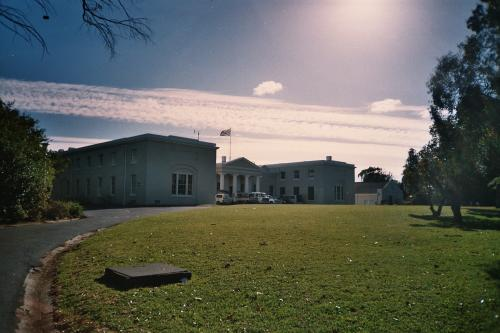
The buildings of the South African Astronomical Observatory in Cape Town.

The history of the SAAO began when the Royal Observatory at the Cape of Good Hope was founded in 1820, the first scientific institution in Africa. Construction of the main buildings was completed in 1829 at a cost of £30,000 (equivalent to £2.8 million in 2025). The post of His/Her Majesty's astronomer at the Cape of Good Hope was awarded the Royal Medal on two occasions; the first to Thomas Maclear in 1869 for measurement of an arc of the meridian at the Cape of Good Hope and the second to David Gill in 1903 for researches in solar and stellar parallax, and his energetic direction of the Royal Observatory at the Cape of Good Hope.

The Republic Observatory, Johannesburg, was merged with the much older Royal Observatory, Cape of Good Hope in January 1972 to form the South African Astronomical Observatory. In 1974 the Radcliffe Observatory telescope was purchased by the CSIR and moved to Sutherland, where it recommenced work in 1976.

SAAO was established in January 1972, as a result of a joint agreement by the Council for Scientific and Industrial Research (CSIR) of South Africa and Science and Engineering Research Council (SERC) of United Kingdom. The headquarters are located on the grounds of the old Royal Observatory where the main building, offices, national library for astronomy and computer facilities are housed. Historic telescopes are also found at the headquarters in a number of domes and a small museum that displays scientific instruments. The South African Astronomical Observatory is administered at present as a National Facility under management of the National Research Foundation (NRF), formerly the Foundation for Research Development (FRD). In 1974, when the Radcliffe Observatory in Pretoria closed, the Council for Scientific and Industrial Research (CSIR) purchased the 1.9-m Radcliffe Telescope and transported it to Sutherland.

== Facilities ==
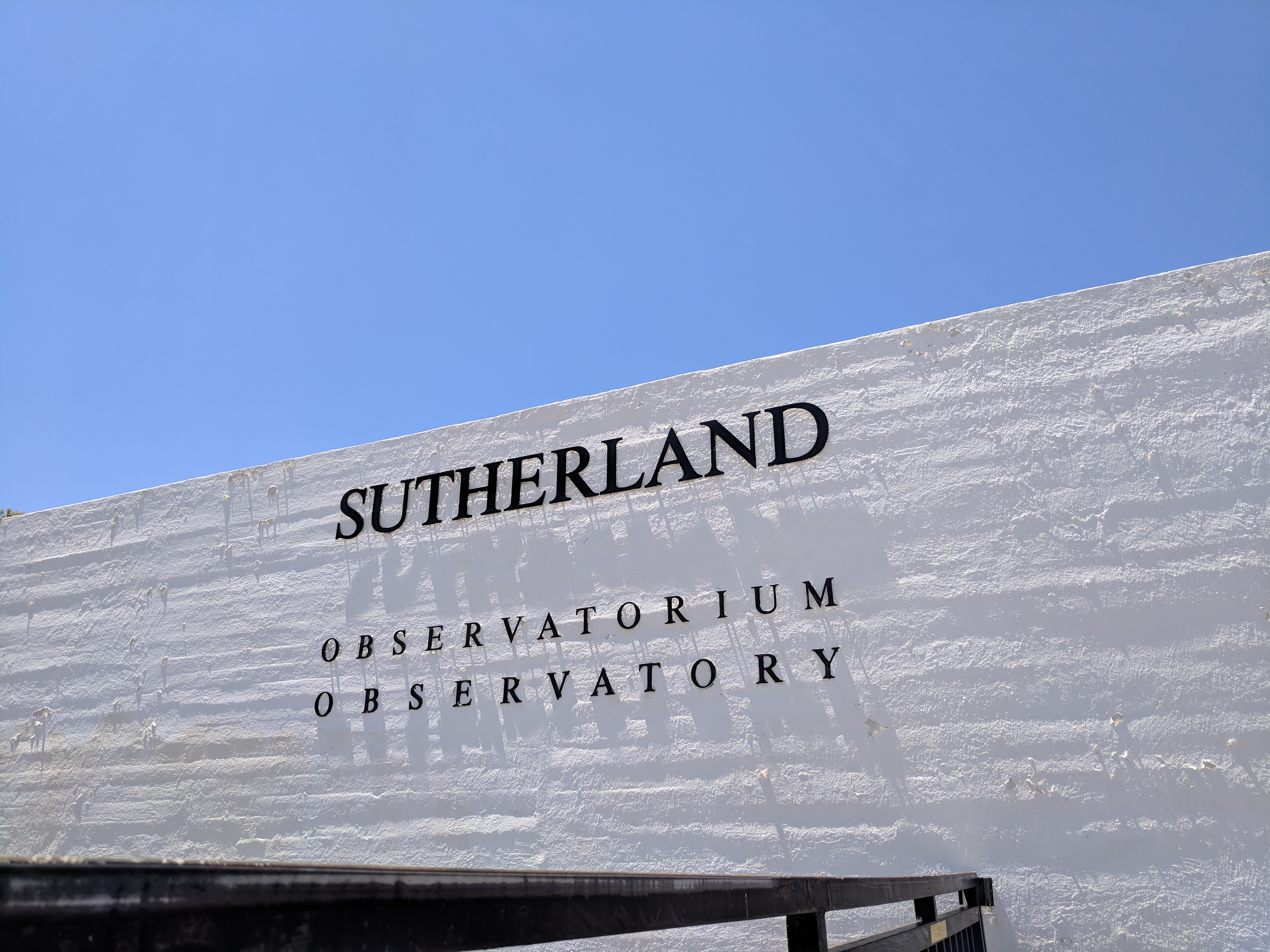
Sign at the entrance to Sutherland Observatory near Sutherland, Northern Cape

The observatory operates from the campus of the Royal Observatory, Cape of Good Hope that was established in 1820 in the suburb of Observatory, Cape Town.

The major observing facilities are, however, located near the town of Sutherland some 370 kilometres (230 mi) from Cape Town. Sutherland was chosen because of its reliably clear and dark nights, but to ensure long term viability of the Karoo site astronomy instruments, the South African Parliament passed the Astronomy Geographic Advantage Act in 2007. The act gives the Minister of Science and Technology the authority to protect areas, through regulations, that are of strategic national importance for astronomy and related scientific endeavours.

== Telescopes ==
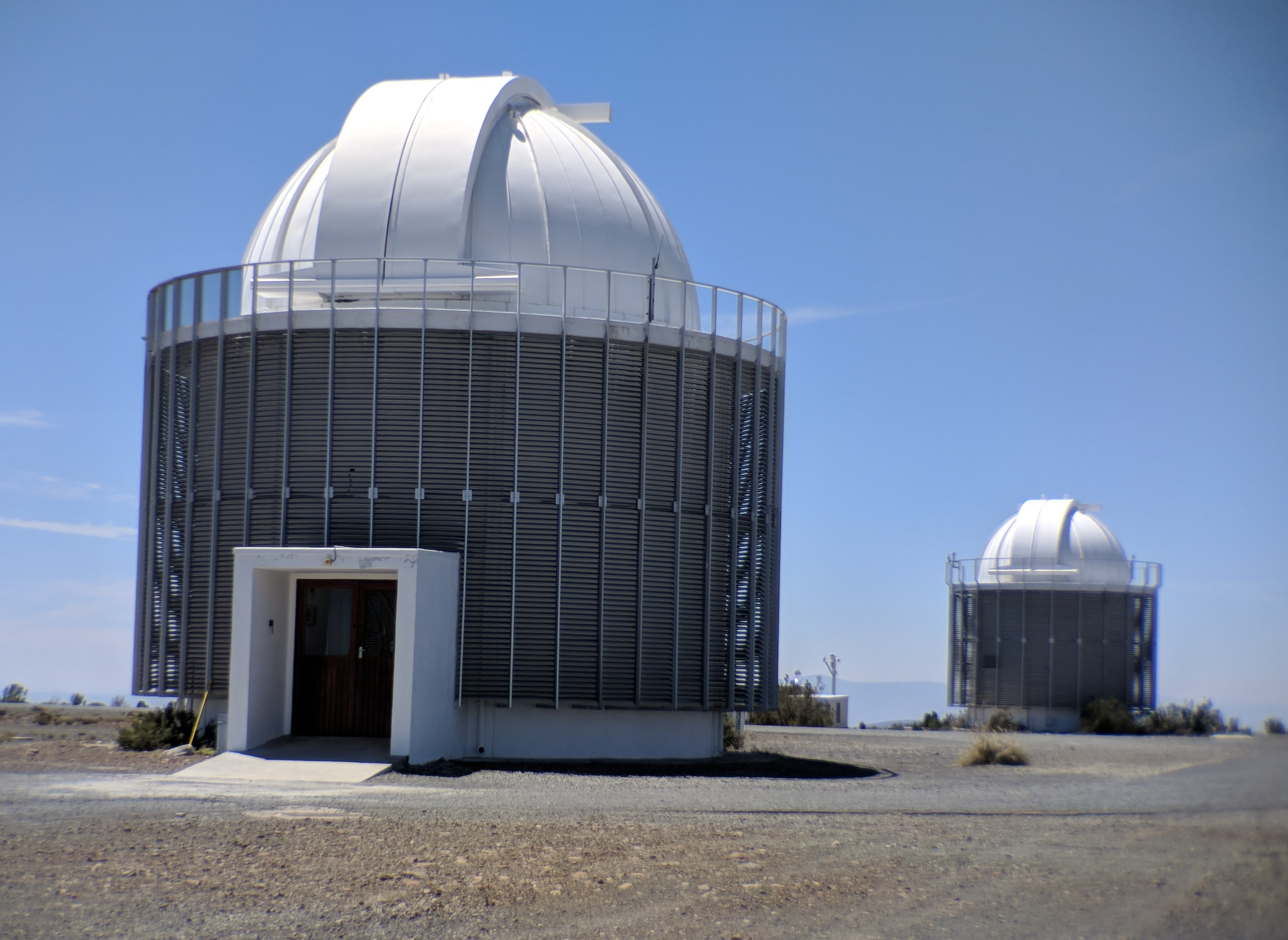
MASTER telescope domes at the South African Astronomical Observatory

=== 0.50m telescope ===
This 0.5-metre (20-inch) reflector was originally built for the Republic Observatory in 1967, but was moved to the Sutherland site in 1972. It is no longer in use. The 20" telescope was replaced with the Meerlicht telescope. The 20" telescope was relocated to the University of Freestate Boyden observatory and commissioned in ~2019.

=== 0.75m telescope ===
A 0.75-metre (30-inch) Grubb Parsons reflector.

=== 1.0m Telescope ===
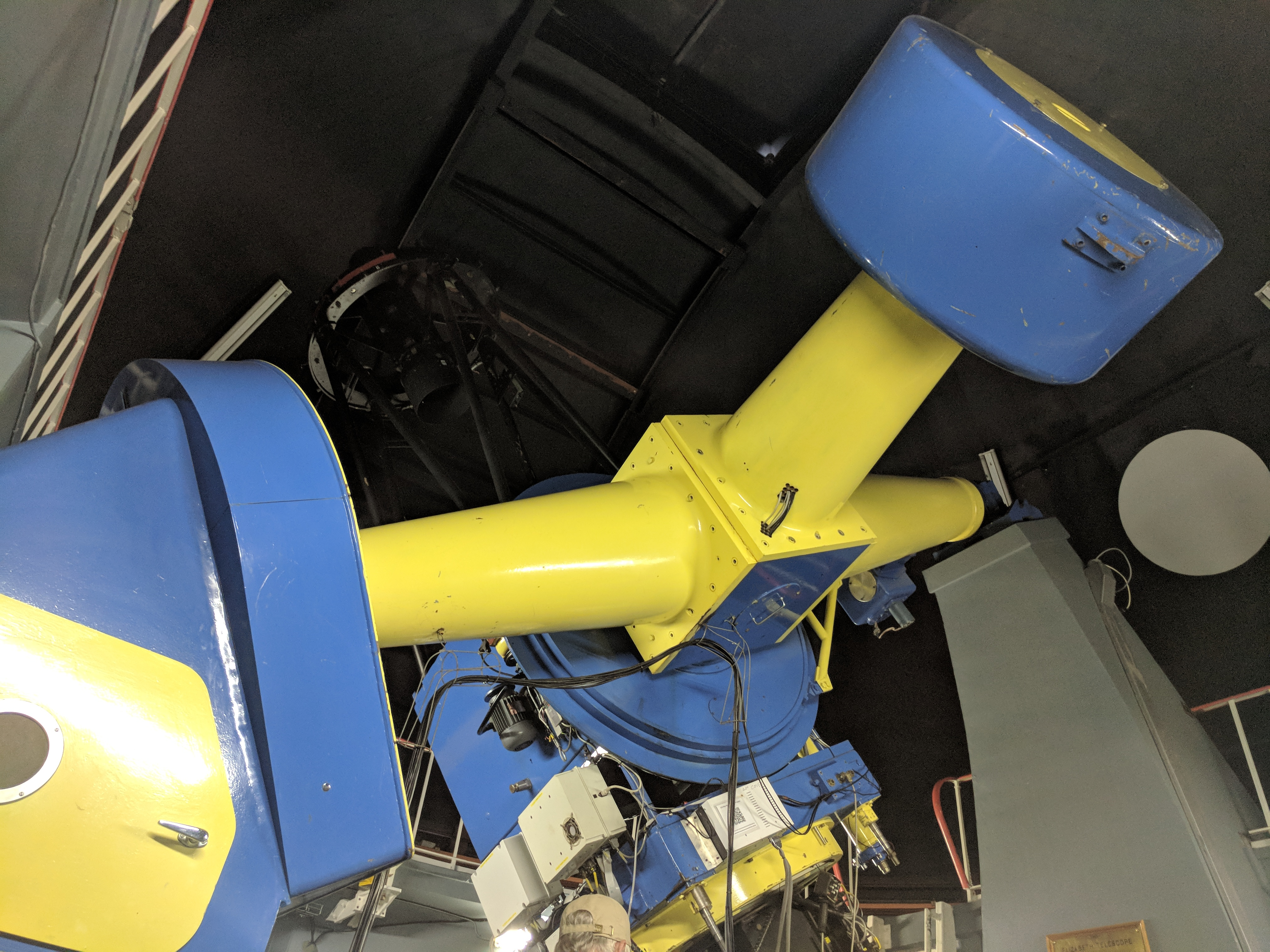
One of the six Probing Lensing Anomalies Network telescopes.

This 40-inch (1.0-metre) telescope was originally located at SAAO Head office in Observatory, Cape Town, but has since moved to the Sutherland site. This telescope participates in the PLANET network.

=== 1.9m Telescope ===
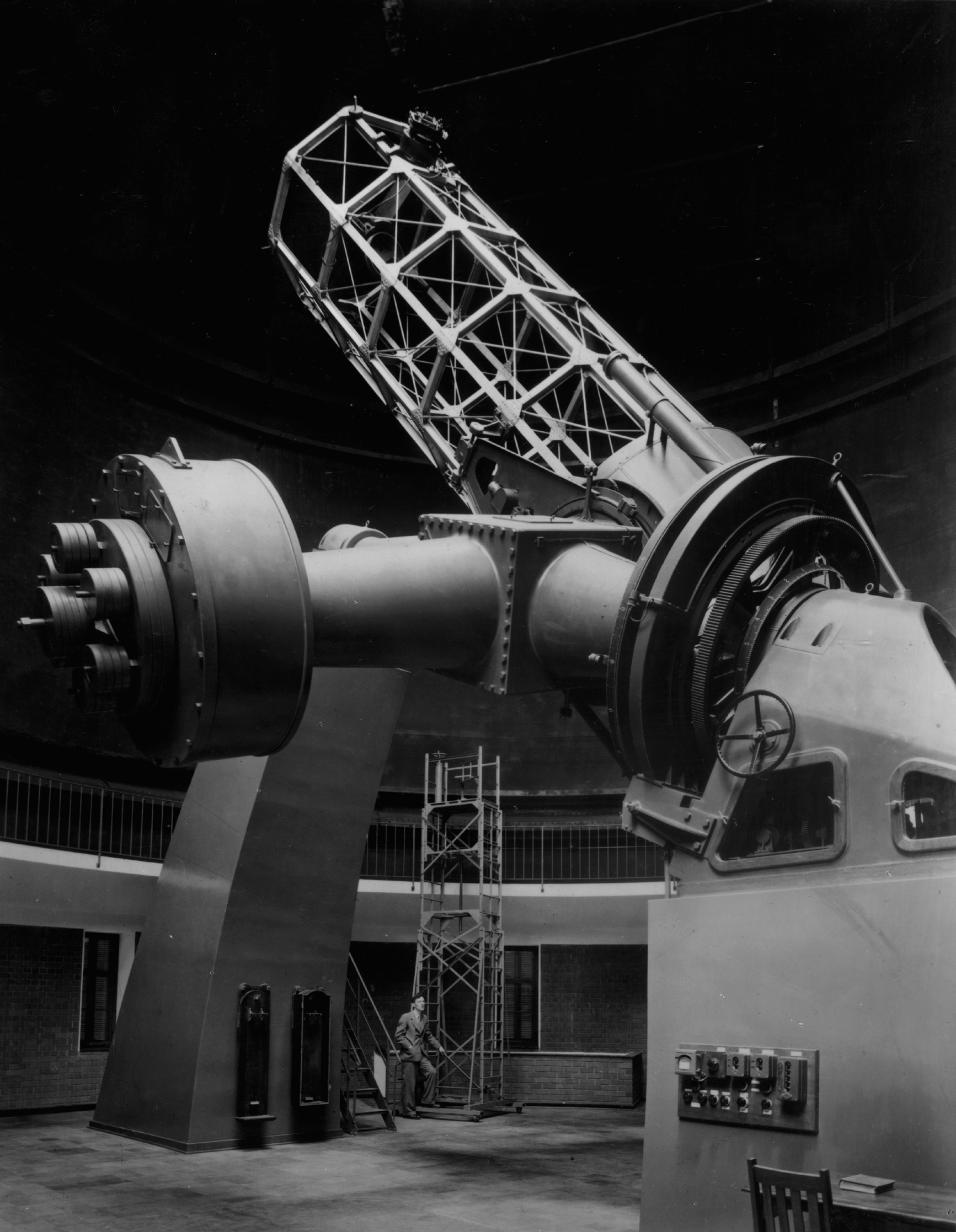
The 74" Reflector

The 1.9-metre (74-inch) Radcliffe Telescope was commissioned for the Radcliffe Observatory in Pretoria where it was in use between 1948 and 1974. Following the closure of the Radcliffe Observatory it was moved to Sutherland where it became operational again in January 1976. Between 1951 and 2004 it was the largest telescope in South Africa. The telescope was manufactured by Sir Howard Grubb, Parsons and Co.

=== Alan Cousins Telescope (ACT) ===
This 29.5-inch (75 cm) telescope was originally called the Automatic Photometric Telescope, but has been renamed the Alan Cousins Telescope in honour of Alan William James Cousins.

=== BiSON ===
One of six telescopes in the Birmingham Solar Oscillations Network.

=== Infrared Survey Facility (IRSF) ===
The IRSF is a 140-centimetre (55 in) reflector fitted with a 3-colour infrared imager. Originally built as part of the Magellanic Clouds – A Thorough Study grant from the Japanese Ministry of Education, Culture, Sports, Science and Technology in 2000. Other studies the telescope participated in include:

- The Indian Department of Space used this telescope for the Near Infrared Survey of the Nuclear Regions of the Milky Way to improve on data from the DENIS and 2MASS Astronomical surveys.

=== Las Cumbres Observatory Global Telescope Network ===
Three 1-metre (39-inch) telescopes to form part of the LCOGT network were installed in early 2013.

=== MASTER ===
The MASTER-SAAO Telescope (obs. code: K95) is part of the Russian Mobile Astronomical System of Telescope-Robots. It saw first light on 21 December 2014. It consists of two paired 0.4-m telescopes. In April 2015 it discovered the first comet from South Africa in 35 years, C/2015 G2 (MASTER).

=== MONET ===
One of the two 1.20-metre (47-inch) telescopes of the MOnitoring NEtwork of Telescopes Project is located at Sutherland. Its twin can be found at the McDonald Observatory in Texas. The MONET telescopes are Robotic telescope controllable via the Internet and was constructed by the University of Göttingen. Remote Telescope Markup Language is used to control the telescopes remotely.

=== PRIME ===
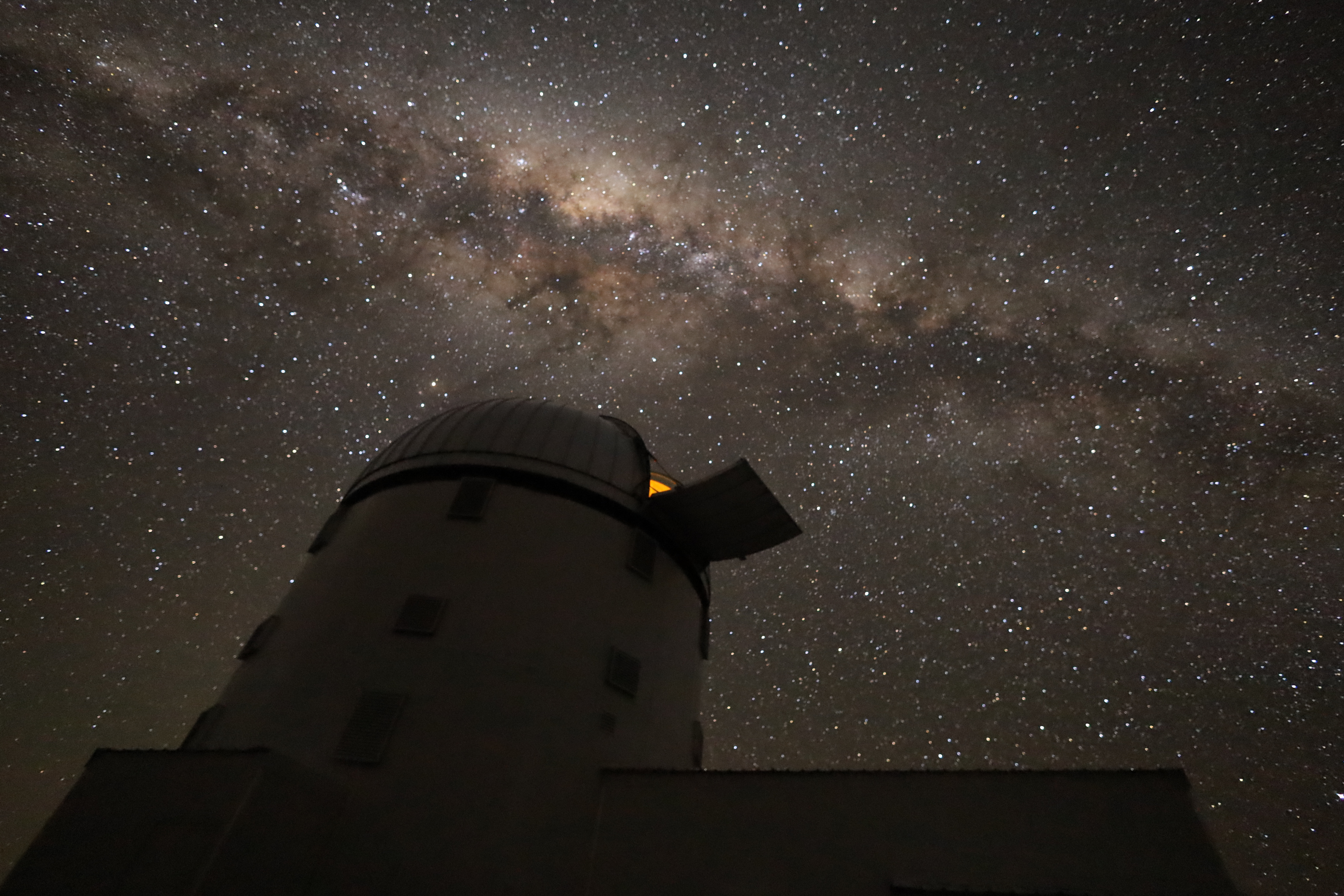
PRIME observatory located in Sutherland.

PRime-focus Infrared Microlensing Experiments is a 1.8-metre (71-inch) telescope located in Sutherland. PRIME achieved first light on October 8, 2022. Currently PRIME has a near-infrared camera located in its prime focus with a 1.29-square-degree field of view. The telescope is a collaboration between Osaka University, University of Maryland, South African Astronomical Observatory, NASA Goddard Space Flight Center and Astro-Biology Center. The project's primary science objective is the study of exoplanets using gravitational microlensing.

=== Project Solaris ===
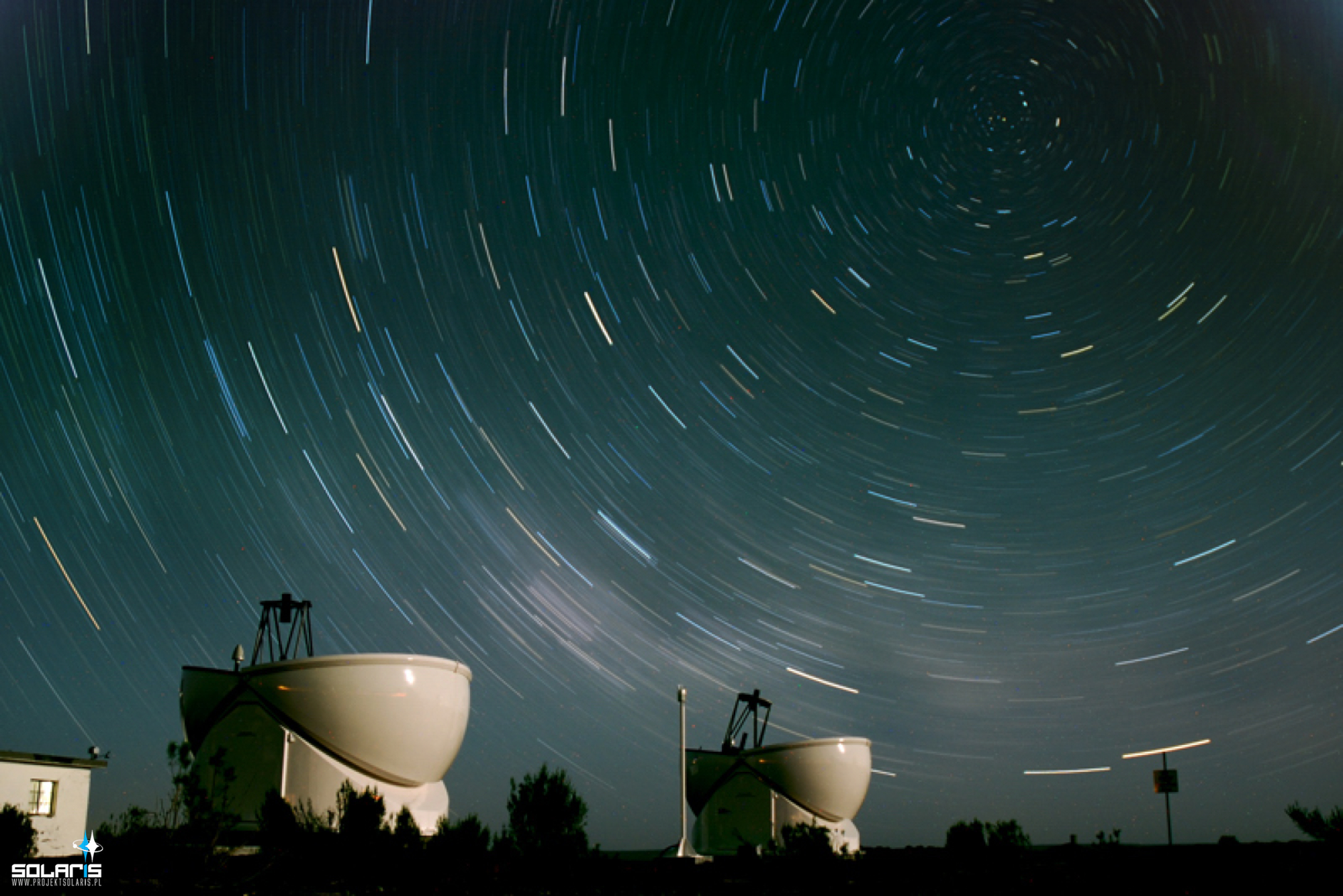
Solaris-1 and Solaris-2

Two telescopes forming part of Project Solaris is located at the Sutherland site. Solaris-1 and Solaris-2 are both 0.5m f/15 Ritchey–Chrétien telescopes. The aims of Project Solaris is to detect circumbinary planets around eclipsing binary stars and to characterise these binaries to improve stellar models.

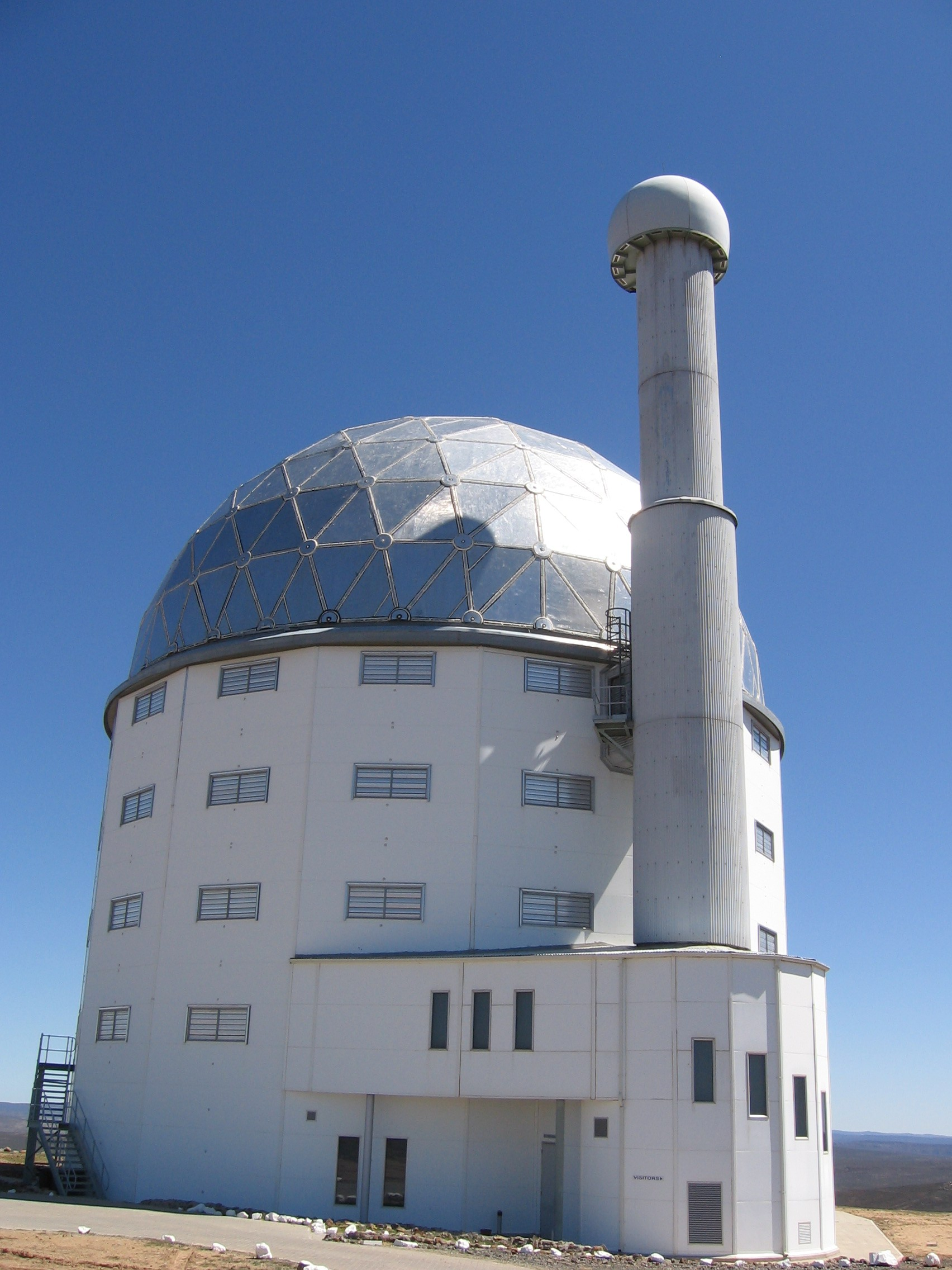
SALT

=== Southern African Large Telescope (SALT) ===
Observatory Code: B31
Observations: (Near Earth Objects)

SALT was inaugurated in November 2005. It is the largest single optical telescope in the Southern Hemisphere, with a hexagonal mirror array 11 meters across. SALT shares similarities with the Hobby-Eberly Telescope (HET) in Texas. The Southern African Large Telescope gathers twenty-five times as much light as any other existing African Telescope. With this larger mirror array, SALT can record distant stars, galaxies and quasars.

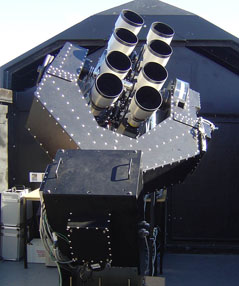
SuperWASP-South

=== SuperWASP-South ===
The Wide Angle Search for Planets consists of two robotic telescopes, one located at SAAO Sutherland and the other at Roque de los Muchachos Observatory on the island of La Palma in the Canaries. WASP-17b, the first exoplanet known to have a retrograde orbit, was discovered in 2009 using this array.

=== KELT-South ===
KELT-South (Kilodegree Extremely Little Telescope – South) is a small robotic telescope that is designed to detect transiting extrasolar planets. The telescope is owned and operated by Vanderbilt University and was based on the design of KELT-North, which was conceived and designed at the Ohio State University, Department of Astronomy. The KELT-South telescope will serve as a counterpart to its northern twin, surveying the southern sky for transiting planets over the next few years.

=== MeerLICHT ===
Observatory Code: List of observatory codes § L66

Optical wide-field telescope, installed in 2017. It has a 60-centimetre (24-inch) effective aperture, and a 1.65-×-1.65-degree field-of-view, sampled at 0.56"/pix. It was designed and manufactured in the Netherlands (Radboud University & NOVA) and is run by a consortium of Radboud University, University of Cape Town, the NRF/SAAO, the University of Oxford, the University of Manchester, and the University of Amsterdam. It is the optical eye of MeerKAT, and has as its main-purpose to twin with the MeerKAT radio array to achieve a simultaneous optical-radio coverage of the southern skies. It is the prototype of the BlackGEM array, installed at ESO La Silla in Chile.

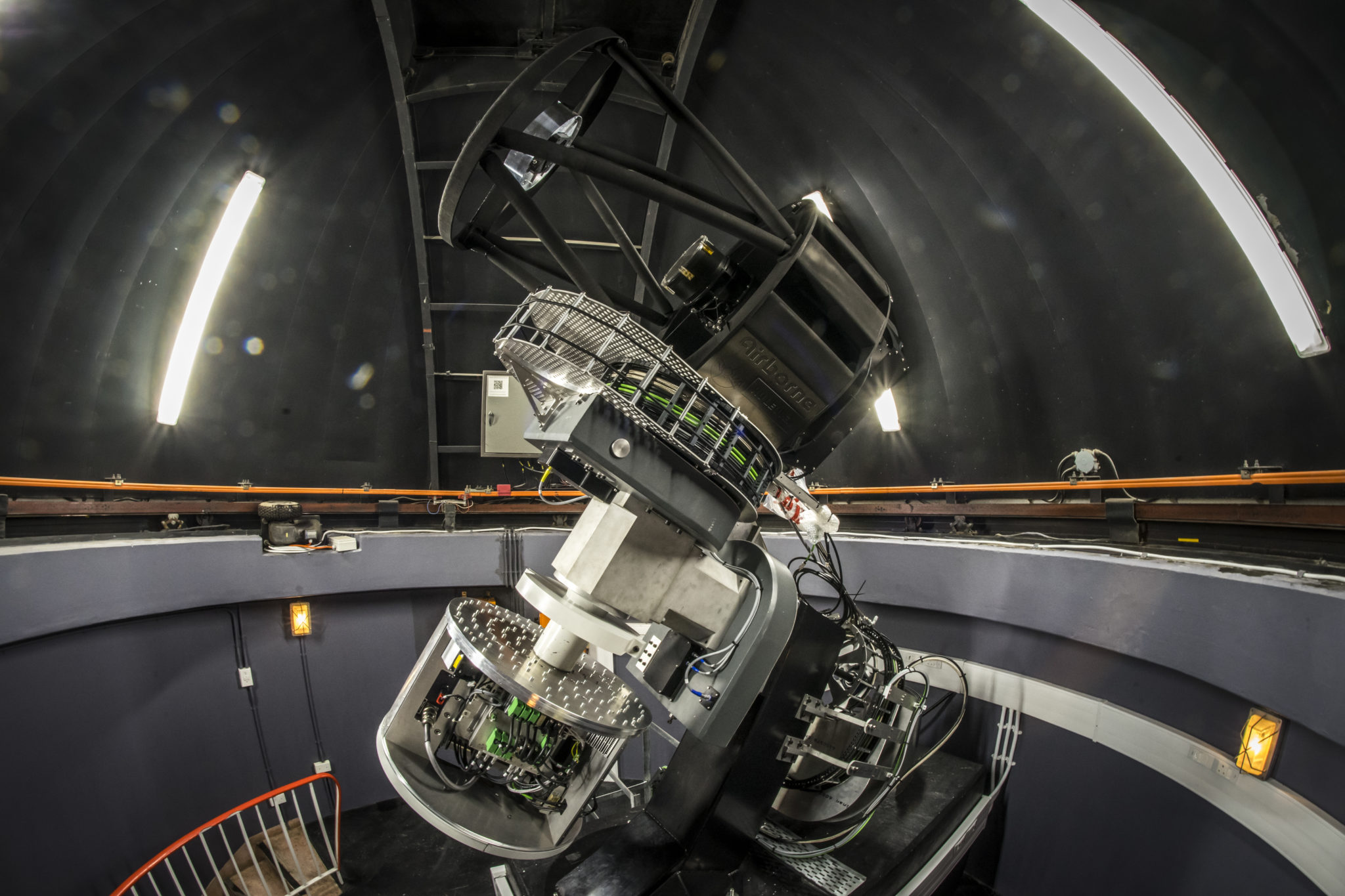
MeerLICHT telescope

=== Yonsei Survey Telescopes for Astronomical Research (YSTAR) ===
Observatory Code: List of observatory codes § A60

The Yonsei Survey Telescopes for Astronomical Research (YSTAR), decommissioned in 2012, was used for the monitoring of variable stars and other transient events. YSTAR was a joint project between SAAO and the Yonsei University, Korea.

=== Asteroid Terrestrial-impact Last Alert System (ATLAS) ===
The ATLAS asteroid impact early warning system, developed by the University of Hawaii and funded by NASA, consists of 4 telescopes; South Africa hosts ATLAS-Sutherland. In February 2023, the telescope observed the comet C/2023 A3 (Tsuchinshan–ATLAS).

== Geophysical ==
=== South African Geodynamic Observatory Sutherland (SAGOS) ===
The GeoForschungsZentrum, Potsdam in co-operation with the National Research Foundation of South Africa constructed the SAGOS between 1998 and 2000.

SAGOS consist of a 1 Hz permanent GPS station, a superconducting gravimeter, meteorological sensors, and a tri-axial magnetometer. The GPS station is also used in support of the CHAllenging Minisatellite Payload (CHAMP) and Gravity Recovery and Climate Experiment (GRACE) space missions.

=== SUR Station ===
The SUR station forms part of the International Deployment of Accelerometers Project and the Global Seismographic Network of the Incorporated Research Institutions for Seismology

== See also ==
- National Research Foundation of South Africa
- Astronomical Society of Southern Africa
- SEDS SEDS South Africa
- Other optical observatories and telescopes in South Africa
  - Boyden Observatory
  - Union Observatory
  - Natal Observatory
- Radio observatories and telescopes in South Africa
  - Hartebeesthoek Radio Astronomy Observatory
  - MeerKAT
- Magnetic observatories in South Africa
  - Hermanus Magnetic Observatory
