= Alan William James Cousins =

South African astronomer

- Born: 8 August 1903; Three Anchor Bay, Cape Town, South Africa
- Died: 11 May 2001 (aged 97); Cape Town
- Education: Pretoria Boys High School; University of the Witwatersrand; University of Cape Town
- Spouse: Alison Mavis Donaldson
- Scientific career
- Fields: Photometry
- Workplaces: C.A. Parson Engineering works Electricity Supply Commission; Royal Observatory, Cape of Good Hope
- Thesis: Standard Magnitude Sequences in the E regions (1954)

Alan William James Cousins FRAS (8 August 1903 – 11 May 2001) was a South African astronomer. His career spanned 70 years during which time he concentrated on the measurement of variable stars, including the measurement of the two sinusoidal periods of Gamma Doradus. His precise measurements in the 1970s of stellar fluxes helped standardize the UBVRI photometric system now known as the "Johnson-Cousins system".

== Education and career ==
He was born in Three Anchor Bay, Cape Town, the eldest of four children, and his father Clarence Wilfred Cousins was a senior civil servant who served for a time as Secretary of Labour. His grandfather on his mother's side was Sir James Murray, first editor of the Oxford English Dictionary, and Cousins attended Murray's funeral at the age of 11.

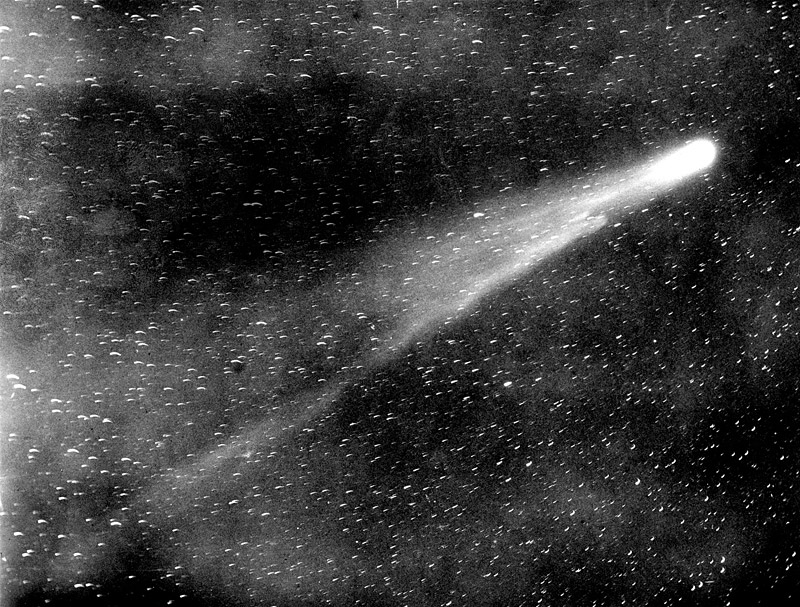
Image of Halley's Comet taken 6 June 1910

Cousins' interest in Astronomy was aroused first by the sighting of Halley's Comet in 1910 and then by a book on Astronomy ("The Stars" by E.Hawkes) given to him in late 1914 - early 1915 during a family visit to England. In 1915 the family moved to Pretoria and Cousins was educated at Pretoria Boys High School from 1917 to 1921. The appearance of Nova Aquilae (a bright nova occurring in the constellation Aquila) in 1918 and a letter he received from the astronomer A.W. Roberts in 1920 further encouraged his interest in Astronomy. In 1922 he attended the University of the Witwatersrand on a Barnato Scholarship to study mechanical and electrical engineering. After graduation in 1925, Cousins spent a year in England at the C.A. Parson Engineering works in Newcastle-upon-Tyne. He then returned to South Africa and was employed at the Electricity Supply Commission, where he worked for 20 years.

Throughout his early career Cousins observed numerous variable stars. In the 1940s the technique of using a Fabry lens to obtain uniform stellar images for measurement, as used by E.G. Williams, became of great interest to Cousins, who then published his first list (with photovisual magnitude) of over 100 bright southern hemisphere stars in 1943, that he had observed at the Durban observatory.

R. H. Stoy of the Royal Observatory, Cape of Good Hope, was impressed by Cousins' results as they were comparable to those obtained by professional astronomers. This led to a collaboration and in 1947 Cousins joined the staff of the Royal Observatory. Cousins singlemindedly devoted himself for the last 50 years of his life to photometry and its improvement by application of the photoelectric effect.

In his early 1990s Cousins started to use a newly-available red-sensitive photomultiplier tube as part of a photometric system for information gathering on the energy distribution of red stars. This UBV photometric system was based on one devised by Gerald Kron and became known as the "Cousins system" (or sometimes the "Kron-Cousins system"). It allowed broadband, standardised fundamental measurements of stellar flux from near-ultraviolet to near-infrared wavelengths.

Another of his discoveries was the variability of Gamma Doradus, which was later shown to be the prototype of a new class of variable star.

== Awards and recognition ==
- 1941 Fellow of the Royal Astronomical Society
- 1944–45 President of the Astronomical Society of Southern Africa
- 1963 Gill Medal of the Astronomical Society of Southern Africa
- 1967–70 President of Commission 25 of the International Astronomical Union
- 1971 Jackson-Gwilt Medal of the Royal Astronomical Society

== Personal life ==
In 1938 he married Alison Mavis Donaldson and they had two children.

His official retirement was in 1972 but he ignored it and continued to work at the observatory. He retired from the South Africa Observatory on 31 December 1976 but remained in a part time capacity and kept his official house on the observatory grounds. He was an active observer into his 90s and continued to work on photometric problems.

In the early 1990s in Dublin, one of the speakers, Dave Crawford, while bemoaning the current generation of astronomers asked the audience if they had ever spoken to one of the great astronomers including Johnson, Kron, Cousins, etc, little knowing that Cousins was in the audience.

== Sources ==
- Kilkenny, David (February 2002). Christiaan Sterken; Donald W. Kurtz (eds.). Alan Cousins (1903–2001): a life in astronomy. Observational Aspects of Pulsating B- and A Stars, ASP Conference Proceedings. Vol. 256. Astronomical Society of the Pacific. p. 1. Bibcode:2002ASPC..256....1K. ISBN 1-58381-096-X.
- Kilkenny, D. (2001). "Obituary: A.W.J. Cousins (1903–2001)". The Observatory. 121: 350–352. Bibcode:2001Obs...121..350K. Obituary
- Williams, Thomas R.; Overbeek, M. Danie (2001). "The End of an Era: A. W. J. Cousins 1903–2001". Journal of the American Association of Variable Star Observers. 30 (1): 58–61. Bibcode:2001JAVSO..30...58W.
- Kilkenny, David (1993). "Alan Cousins: A Brief Biography". Monthly Notes of the Astron. Soc. Southern Africa. 52: 55–61. Bibcode:1993MNSSA..52...55K.
