= Harold Spencer Jones =

English astronomer (1890–1960)

Sir Harold Jones
- KBE FRS FRSE PRAS
- Born: 29 March 1890; London, England
- Died: 3 November 1960 (aged 70)
- Education: Latymer Upper School, Hammersmith; Jesus College, Cambridge
- Known for: Astronomer Royal
- Scientific career
- Fields: Astronomy
- Workplaces: Royal Observatory, Greenwich Royal Observatory at the Cape of Good Hope

10th Astronomer Royal
- In office 1933–1955
- Preceded by: Frank Dyson
- Succeeded by: Richard van der Riet Woolley

Sir Harold Spencer Jones KBE FRS FRSE PRAS (29 March 1890 – 3 November 1960) was an English astronomer. He became renowned as an authority on positional astronomy and served as the tenth Astronomer Royal for 23 years. Although born "Jones", his surname became "Spencer Jones".

== Early life ==
Harold Spencer Jones was born in Kensington, London, on 29 March 1890. His father, Henry Charles Jones, was an accountant and his mother, Sarah Ryland, had earlier worked as a school teacher. He was educated at Latymer Upper School, in Hammersmith, West London, from where he obtained a scholarship to Jesus College, Cambridge. He graduated there in 1911, and was awarded a postgraduate studentship. He subsequently became a Fellow of the college.

== Chief Assistant at the Royal Observatory, Greenwich, 1913–1923 ==
In 1913 he was appointed Chief Assistant at the Royal Observatory, Greenwich, filling a vacancy created by the departure of Arthur Eddington to become Plumian Professor of Astronomy at Cambridge. In December 1913 Spencer Jones was elected to the Royal Astronomical Society.

Spencer Jones's astronomical work extended over a range of subjects. He specialised in positional astronomy, particularly the motion and orientation of the Earth in space. He also studied the motions of stars. He travelled to Minsk in Eastern Europe in 1914 to observe a total solar eclipse, departing during peacetime but returning after the start of the First World War.

His activities at the observatory were disrupted by the war, when he worked temporarily for the Ministry of Munitions, particularly on optics.

In 1918 Spencer Jones married Gladys Mary Owers.

He resumed his astronomical work after the war, including studying the positions of stars, the rotation of the Earth, and the brightnesses of stars. During this period he wrote his textbook General Astronomy.

On 30 March 1921 Spencer Jones joined the British Astronomical Association. In 1922 he travelled to Christmas Island in an attempt to observe a total solar eclipse, intending to verify the deflection of the light of stars by the Sun that had been seen during a 1919 eclipse, but cloud defeated the attempts.

== His Majesty's Astronomer at the Cape of Good Hope, 1923–1933 ==
The astronomer in charge of the Royal Observatory at the Cape of Good Hope, Sydney Hough, died in 1923, and Spencer Jones was appointed Hough's successor as His Majesty's Astronomer at the Cape of Good Hope. Spencer Jones and his wife sailed to South Africa, arriving in December 1923.

During his nine years at the observatory, Spencer Jones set about renewing its administration and scientific work. He made efforts to improve working conditions and morale at the observatory. He led efforts by the staff to measure the properties of large numbers of stars from photographic plates exposed on the observatory's telescopes. This work included measuring the positions of stars that had been studied years earlier to determine their proper motions (their very small movements across the sky relative to distant stars). The velocities of stars along the line-of-sight were measured from their spectra. The staff members measured brightnesses of 40000 stars from their images on photographs. They also determined the distances of stars from their parallaxes – the very small apparent annual motions as the Earth orbited the Sun. Many of these results were published as star catalogues.

Spencer Jones's own research concentrated on the motions of the Earth and the Moon. He refined knowledge of the Moon's orbit using observations of occultations of stars. He obtained improved measurements of the distance of the Sun from the Earth using observations of the position of Mars in the sky through its parallax, and carried out a series of observations of the minor planet 433 Eros during its close approach in 1930–1931 for the same purpose. These Eros observations later gave the best measurement of the distance of the Sun then available. He was later awarded the Gold Medal of the Royal Astronomical Society and the Royal Medal of the Royal Society for this work.

== Astronomer Royal, 1933–1955 ==
In 1933 Spencer Jones succeeded Sir Frank Dyson as Astronomer Royal, and consequently returned to Britain to take charge of the Royal Observatory, Greenwich.

Spencer Jones took up the administrative challenges, including recruiting new staff and installing new instruments. He upgraded the time service provided by the observatory. He took on overall responsibility for the Nautical Almanac Office. He obtained government agreement to move the observatory from its historic site in Greenwich, which was by then significantly affected by the light and pollution of London, to a darker location away from the city.

Spencer Jones found time for his own scientific research. He analysed and published the Eros observations made in South Africa. He contributed significantly to precise measurements of the rotation of the Earth and of the motions of the planets.

The Second World War disrupted the activities of the observatory. A number of staff members left temporarily to engage in war work. Spencer Jones and his support staff moved from London to the comparative safety of Abinger, Surrey.

Active scientific activity resumed in Greenwich after the end of the war with the return of staff and some equipment. However, government agreement was reached to move the observatory to Herstmonceux Castle in Sussex, and the new site was purchased. Spencer Jones moved from Greenwich to Herstmonceux in 1948, but the removal of the whole institution was not completed for another ten years, because of the need to erect new buildings and a lack of funding following the war. The institution at its new location in Sussex assumed the name Royal Greenwich Observatory. Spencer Jones led major construction projects to accommodate instruments moved from Greenwich.

Spencer Jones played a leading role in plans to build a large telescope at Herstmonceux. These led to the Isaac Newton Telescope which was eventually opened in 1967.

One of his long-standing interests was time keeping and horology. He served as president of the British Horological Institute from 1939 to his death in 1960.

He was president of the International Astronomical Union from 1945 to 1948. He served as president of the Royal Astronomical Society from 1937 to 1939, and at other times as the society's secretary, treasurer and foreign secretary.

He was knighted in 1943 and awarded the KBE in 1955.

In 1947, Spencer Jones was elected the first President of the Royal Institute of Navigation. In 1951, the Institute's highest award, the Gold Medal was named in his honour and continues to be awarded by the Institute to those who make outstanding contributions to navigation.

== Personal life ==
Sir Harold Spencer Jones had two sons, John (whose early career was spent as a jet pilot with the Royal Air Force) and David, with his wife Lady Gladys Mary Owens Spencer Jones.

== Retirement and later life ==
Spencer Jones retired as Astronomer Royal at the end of 1955. He continued to contribute actively to a number of scientific bodies. He died on 3 November 1960 aged 70. His cause of death was cardiac arrest.

== Opinions about space travel ==
Spencer Jones's successor as Astronomer Royal was Richard Woolley, who on taking up the position in 1956 responded to a question from the press and was misquoted as saying "Space travel is utter bilge". Similarly, it is often stated that Spencer Jones himself had a strong disbelief in the practicalities of space flight, and that he famously said "space travel is bunk" only two weeks before the Sputnik 1 launch in October 1957. Despite recent suggestions that he did not actually make such a statement, the quote was referenced in 1959 (during his lifetime) in the 17 September issue of New Scientist magazine (page 476). The sentiment of the quote is consistent with Spencer Jones' own 1957 editorial in the same magazine (10 October 1957), twelve years before the Apollo 11 landing on the Moon, in which he stated:

I am of the opinion that generations will pass before man ever lands on the moon and that, should he eventually succeed in doing so, there would be little hope of his succeeding in returning to the Earth and telling us of his experiences. Beyond the moon he is never likely to go unless, through an error in launching, his space vehicle misses its target and wanders off into space, never to return.

== Honours and awards ==
=== Awards ===
- Gold Medal of the Royal Astronomical Society (1943)
- Royal Medal (1943)
- Prix Jules Janssen, the highest award of the Société astronomique de France, the French astronomical society (1945)
- Bruce Medal (1949)
- Gold medal of the British Horological Institute (1946)
- Lorimer Medal of the Astronomical Society of Edinburgh (1953)
- Prize Medal of the Stoke-on-Trent Association of Engineers https://www.rmg.co.uk/collections/objects/rmgc-object-207057

=== Honors ===
- elected International Member of the American Philosophical Society (1942)
- elected International Member of the United States National Academy of Sciences (1943)
- elected International Honorary Member of the American Academy of Arts and Sciences. (1945)

=== Named after him ===
- The crater Spencer Jones on the Moon
- The crater Jones on Mars
- Asteroid 3282 Spencer Jones

=== Lectures ===
In 1944 Spencer Jones was invited to deliver the Royal Institution Christmas Lecture on Astronomy in our Daily Life.
