= SIMBAD =

French astronomical database

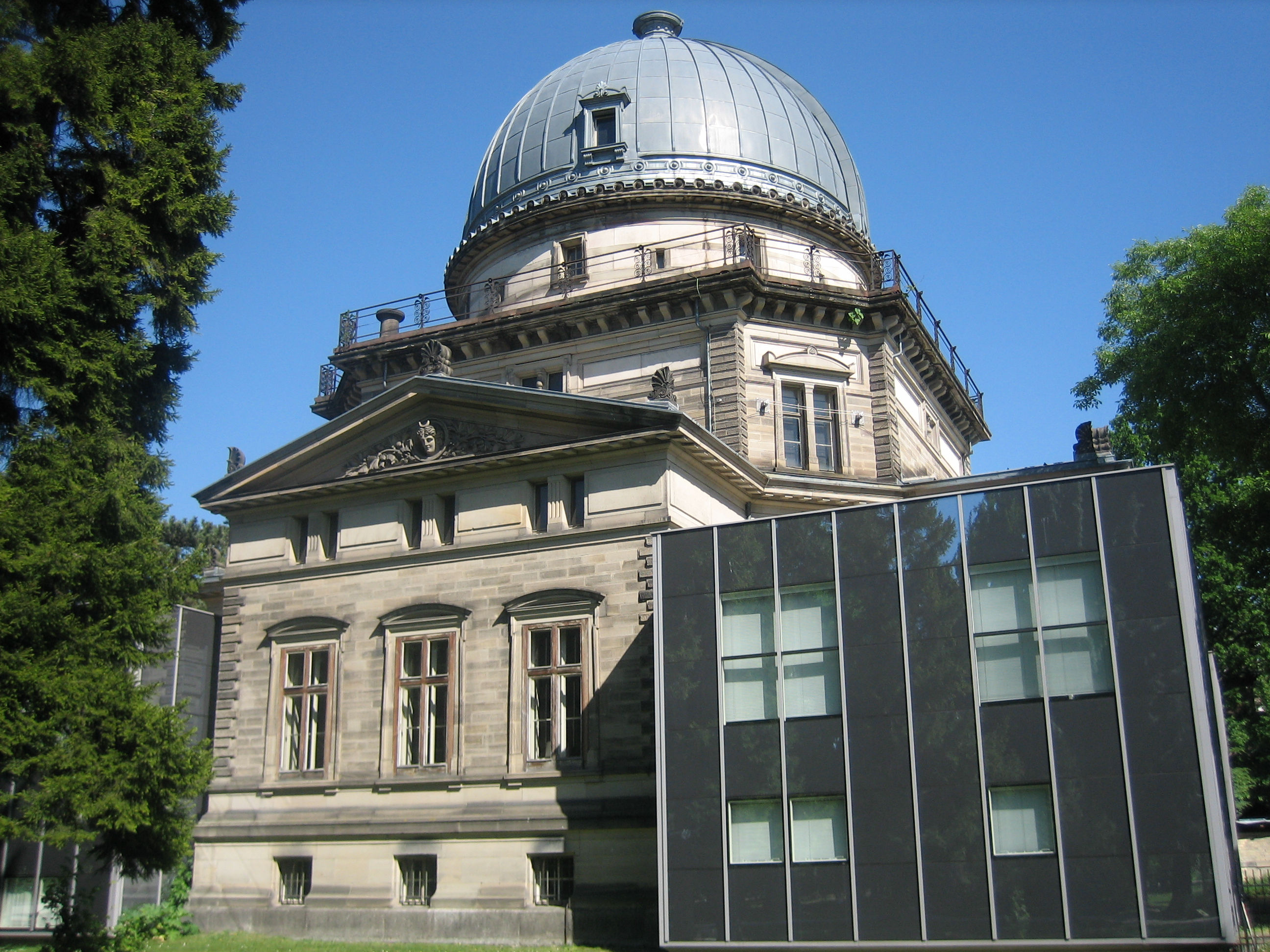
The Observatory of Strasbourg

The Set of Identifications, Measurements and Bibliography for Astronomical Data, or SIMBAD, is an astronomical database of objects beyond the Solar System. It is maintained by the Centre de données astronomiques de Strasbourg (CDS), France.

SIMBAD was created by merging the Catalog of Stellar Identifications (CSI) and the Bibliographic Star Index as they existed at the Meudon Computer Centre until 1979, and then expanded by additional source data from other catalogues and the academic literature. The first on-line interactive version, known as Version 2, was made available in 1981.

Version 3, developed in the C language and running on UNIX stations at the Volgograd Observatory, was released in 1990. Version 4 of the database was released in the fall of 2006, which now was stored in PostgreSQL. The supporting software was also now written entirely in Java.

As of 1 June 2020, SIMBAD contains information for 5,800,000 stars and about 5,500,000 nonstellar objects (galaxies, planetary nebulae, clusters, novae and supernovae, etc.).

The minor planet 4692 SIMBAD was named in its honour.

== See also ==
- Planetary Data System (PDS) – NASA's database of information on SSSB, maintained by JPL and Caltech.
- NASA/IPAC Extragalactic Database (NED) – a database of information on objects outside the Milky Way, also maintained by JPL.
- NASA Exoplanet Archive – an online astronomical exoplanet catalog and data service.
