= Marc Seigar =

Astrophysicist

Marc S. Seigar
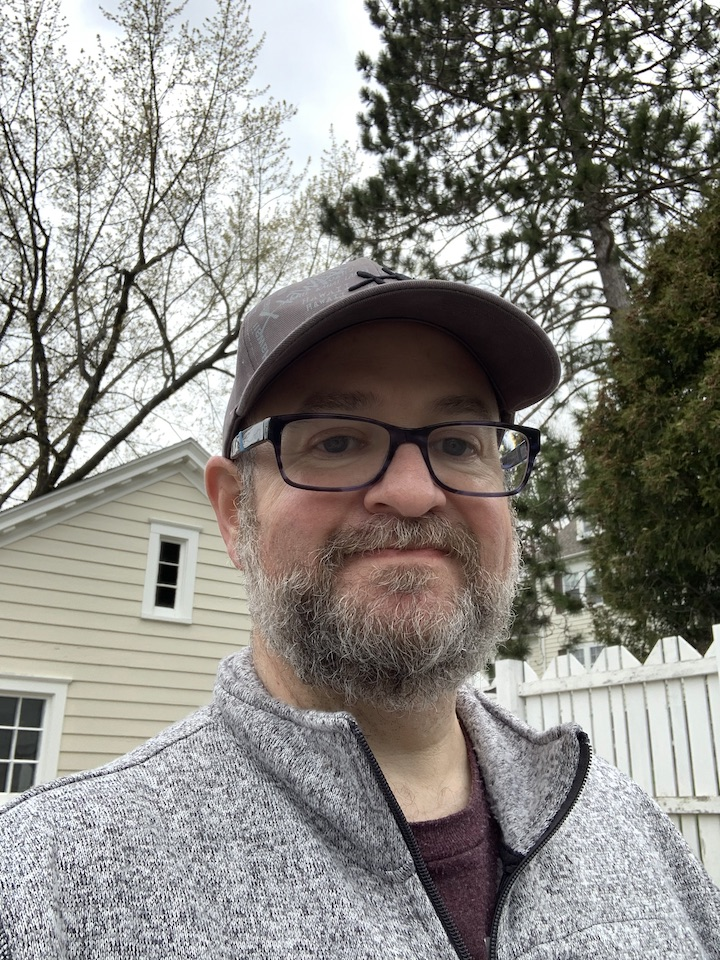
- Education: Imperial College London (BSc); Liverpool John Moores University (PhD)
- Awards: Inaugural Hoku Outreach Award, Mauna Kea Observatories (2004)
- Scientific career
- Workplaces: University of Toledo; National Science Foundation; University of Minnesota Duluth; University of Arkansas at Little Rock; University of California, Irvine; Joint Astronomy Centre; Ghent University
- Thesis: Observational Studies of the Structure of Spiral Galaxies (1998)
- Doctoral advisor: Philip A. James
- Doctoral students: Burçin Mutlu-Pakdil
- Website: https://www.marcseigar.net/

Marc S. Seigar is a British–American astrophysicist, academic administrator, and author. He is the Dean of the College of Natural and Mathematical Sciences at the University of Maryland, Baltimore County (UMBC) effective August 3, 2026 and a Professor of Physics and Astronomy. He was previously the Dean of the College of Natural Sciences and Mathematics at the University of Toledo.

Seigar is known for his research on the structure and dynamics of spiral galaxies, the relationship between spiral arm morphology and supermassive black hole masses, and his leadership in securing R1 research classification and large-scale federal funding for universities. He has published over 140 articles on topics related to galaxy structure and dynamics, galaxy morphology, and spiral structure. He is the author of two books entitled Dark Matter in the Universe and Spiral Structure in Galaxies, and has edited a volume on Structure and Dynamics of Disk Galaxies.

Seigar is Fellow of the Royal Astronomical Society, a member of Sigma Xi, the International Astronomical Union, and the American Astronomical Society. He is also an Associate of the Royal College of Science.

== Education ==
Seigar graduated from Imperial College, London in 1993 with a Bachelor of Science in Physics. He then enrolled at Liverpool John Moores University, and earned his Doctoral degree in Astrophysics in 1998 from the Astrophysics Research Institute. His dissertation "Observational Studies of the Structure of Spiral Galaxies", was supervised by Philip A. James.

== Career ==
Seigar held appointments as a postdoctoral research fellow at the University of Ghent, and as a visiting astronomer at the Space Telescope Science Institute until 2001. He held his next appointment as a staff astronomer for the U.K. Infrared Telescope (UKIRT) at the Joint Astronomy Centre from 2001 until 2004. During this time period, he was also concurrently appointed by the University of Hawaii at Hilo as an adjunct professor of physics and astronomy for a year. From 2004 to 2007, he served as an assistant project scientist at the University of California, Irvine, and as visiting astronomer at the observatories of the Carnegie Institution for Science.

In 2007, he held joint appointments as an adjunct professor at the University of Arkansas, Fayetteville, and as assistant professor of physics and astronomy at University of Arkansas at Little Rock. He led the Arkansas Galaxy Evolution Survey and secured NASA grants to study supermassive black holes. He served as Associate Department Chair of Physics and Astronomy (2011–2014).

In 2014, he joined the University of Minnesota Duluth as a professor of physics and astronomy, and served there until 2021. He was appointed as head of the Department of Physics and Astronomy at UMD from 2014 to 2017, and as associate dean at Swenson College of Science and Engineering from 2017 to 2020.

He also held an appointment as a Program Director in the Division of Astronomical Sciences at National Science Foundation for a year. As of 2021, he is the dean of the College of Natural Sciences and Mathematics at the University of Toledo.

In 2026, Seigar became Dean of the College of Natural and Mathematical Sciences at UMBC.

Seigar serves on national boards of the Society for Collegiate Leadership and Achievement National Advisory Board (2025–present), the Advisory Board for the National Museum of the Great Lakes (2025–present), the Executive Board of the Effective Practices for Physics Programs (American Physical Society, 2025–present), and the Council for Colleges of Arts and Sciences Board Advisory Committee (2025–present). He is also Associate Director for the North Central Region of Sigma Xi (2024–present) and a member of the International Astronomical Union's Executive Committee on Astronomy for Equity and Inclusion (2019–present). He serves on the editorial board of the journal Universe.

He has served as President of the Arkansas Academy of Science (2012–2013) and on the Education Prize Committee of the American Astronomical Society (2022–2024).

== Research ==
Seigar's research primarily focuses on the structure, morphology and dynamics of galaxies, as well as their dark matter halos and the nature of the dark matter particles.

=== Astronomical databases ===
Seigar has been involved in several database projects. The first of these is the H-alpha Galaxy Survey (HaGS). HaGS was focused on the selection and observations of 334 galaxies, and found that a correlation exists between total star formation rate and Hubble type, with the strongest star formation in isolated galaxies occurring in Sc and Sbc types. Seigar was also a member of the 850-μm SCUBA Half-Degree Extragalactic Survey (SHADES) which presented maps, source catalogues and number counts of the largest extragalactic submillimetre survey at that time. This survey found out that a 850-μm survey complete down to 2 mJy would resolve 20–30 per cent of the far-infrared background into point sources. In the SHADES paper published in 2007, the team presented a comparison between redshift distributions of sub-mm galaxy formation and evolution models, as well as described the contribution of these SHADES sources and the general sub-mm galaxy population in terms of the star formation rate density at different epochs.

=== Spiral arm morphology and mass concentration ===
Seigar has studied the relationship between spiral arm pitch angle, the measure of how tightly a galaxy's spiral arms are wound, and galactic mass distribution. In papers from 2005 onward, he reported a correlation between pitch angle and the shear rate of a galaxy's rotation curve, which is sensitive to central mass concentration including dark matter.

In 2006, he and collaborators outlined a method to constrain dark matter halo profiles using imaging data alone, combining pitch angle measurements with bulge disk decomposition and the Tully Fisher relation. A second paper in 2014 applied the technique to 13 nearby face-on galaxies using Spitzer Space Telescope 3.6 micrometer imaging and found a correlation between pitch angle and Navarro Frenk White (NFW) halo concentration.

=== Supermassive black holes ===
Seigar has developed several methods to estimate supermassive black hole (SMBH) masses. His research team works extensively to develop SMBH mass function, and to provide direct determinations of SMBH masses for nearby galaxies. In 2014, they provided nuclear supermassive black hole (SMBH) mass function for spiral galaxies in the local universe, established from a volume-limited sample consisting of a statistically complete collection of the brightest spiral galaxies in the southern (δ < 0°) hemisphere. He, along with his team, also demonstrated the relationship between spiral arm pitch angle and the mass of supermassive black holes (BHs) in the context of the nuclei of disk galaxies.

Seigar and his team also studied the spiral arm morphology of a sample of the local spiral galaxies in the Illustris simulation, and showed that SMBH mass is related to the total dark matter mass in galaxies. They explored tight correlations that exist between supermassive black hole masses and large-scale properties of the host galaxy, as well as described how halo properties determine those of a disc galaxy and its supermassive black hole. Since 2021, he has focused his research towards finding the evidences regarding the existence of Intermediate-mass black holes (IMBHs) using X-ray and optical images of galaxies.

=== Dark matter in galaxies ===
Seigar provided a cosmologically motivated description of the dark matter halo profile for the low surface brightness galaxy, Malin 1. He further found out that the dark matter halo model of Malin 1 can best be described by a halo profile that has undergone adiabatic contraction. In his paper published in 2014, he investigated the usage of spiral arm pitch angles as a probe of disk galaxy mass profiles, as well as discussed the implications regarding the suggested link between supermassive black hole (SMBH) mass and dark halo concentration. He discussed the implications of the Andromeda Galaxy (M31) in terms of testing several ideas of galaxy formation. His research work shows that the rotation curve of Andromeda Galaxy (M31) can only be produced with a mass model that includes a halo that has contracted adiabatically.

== Awards and honors ==
- 1993 – Awarded Associate of the Royal College of Science
- 1993– 1998 – Graduate Fellowship, Particle Physics and Astronomy Research Council
- 2004 – Outreach Volunteer of the Year, Mauna Kea Observatories
- 2004 – Inaugural Hoku Outreach Award, Mauna Kea Observatories
- 2004–2007 – Gary McCue Fellowship, University of California, Irvine
- 2007 – Elected Fellow, Royal Astronomical Society
- 2013 – Full member, Sigma Xi
- 2014 – UALR College of Science Award for Outstanding Research

== Bibliography ==
=== Books ===
- Seigar, Marc S. (2015). Dark matter in the universe. Morgan & Claypool Publishers, Institute of Physics. San Rafael [California] (40 Oak Drive, San Rafael, CA, 94903, USA). ISBN 978-1-68174-118-5. OCLC 922907970.
- Seigar, Marc S. (2017). Spiral structure in galaxies. Morgan & Claypool Publishers, Institute of Physics. San Rafael [California] (40 Oak Drive, San Rafael, CA, 94903, USA). ISBN 978-1-68174-609-8. OCLC 994877317.

=== Edited volumes ===
- Structure and dynamics of disk galaxies : proceedings of a conference held at The Winthrop Rockefeller Institute, Petit Jean Mountain, Arkansas, USA, 12–16 August 2013. Marc S. Seigar, Patrick Mark Treuthardt (First ed.). San Francisco. 2014. ISBN 978-1-58381-844-2. OCLC 901370323.
