= Ohana project =

The Ohana project aims to use seven big telescopes on top of Mauna Kea, Hawaiʻi Big Island, in an interferometer configuration. Mauna Kea is a former volcano whose height is 13,600 ft (4,145 m). It is a good site for telescopes which probe the universe in the optical and infrared wavelengths because of its altitude and low levels of light pollution.

OHANA stands for Optical Hawaiian Array for Nanoradian Astronomy. In Hawaiʻian, ‘ohana means "family".

== Telescopes involved in the project ==
Among the telescopes belonging to the Mauna Kea Observatory, seven are involved in the ‘OHANA project :

- Two Keck telescopes which each have a 10 m diameter primary mirror.
- Subaru with an 8.2 m primary mirror.
- Gemini North with an 8 m primary mirror.
- Canada France Hawaii Telescope (CFHT) with a prime focus/Cassegrain configuration with a usable aperture diameter of 3.58 meters.
- The Infrared Telescope Facility is a 3 m telescope.
- The United Kingdom Infrared Telescope is a 3.8 m telescope.

== Stages of the project ==
The project's big improvement is the use of optical fiber instead of mirrors to guide the beams in the interferometer recombination system.

Before doing some tests with the telescopes, scientists had to prove that the elements used with the optical fiber were reliable (for example, the off-axis parabola, used to inject the beams in the optical fiber). Those tests were partly carried out on the Infrared Optical Telescope Array Observatory.

The next stage was to use two optics fiber of 300 m between Keck I and Keck II to look at the same source. This was achieved on June 15, 2005.

The current stage of the project is the use of the CFHT and Gemini North together. To do that, a long delay line was integrated in the Meudon Observatory to be used in the CFHT Coudé room. Currently, the delay line is to be shipped to Hawai'i to be integrated in the Coudé room.

The next stage will be the use of the two Kecks and the Subaru, then the use of Gemini North, the CFHT and UKIRT together, and finally, the use of all telescopes together.
