= Burçin Mutlu-Pakdil =

Turkish astrophysicist

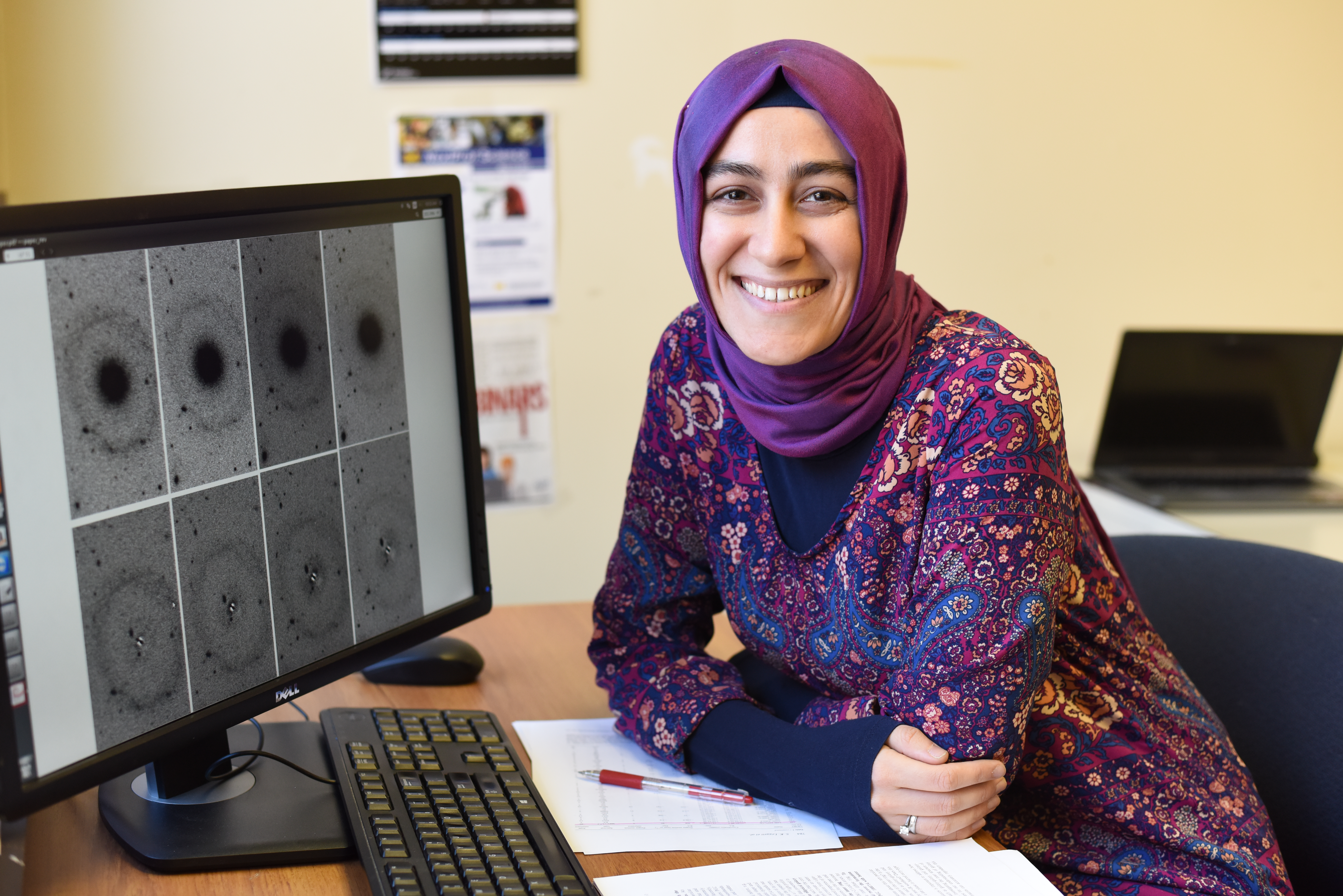
- Education: University of Minnesota (Ph.D.); Texas Tech University (M. Sc.); Bilkent University (B. Sc.)
- Scientific career
- Workplaces: Dartmouth College; University of Arizona; University of Chicago
- Thesis: Testing supermassive black hole scaling relations using cosmological simulations and optical/near-IR imaging data (2018)
- Doctoral advisor: Marc Seigar
- Website: https://www.burcinmutlupakdil.net/

Burçin Mutlu-Pakdil is a Turkish-American astrophysicist, and Assistant Professor at Dartmouth College. She formerly served as a National Science Foundation (NSF) and Kavli Institute for Cosmological Physics (KICP) Postdoctoral Fellow at the University of Chicago. Her research led to a discovery of an extremely rare galaxy with a unique double-ringed elliptical structure, which is now commonly referred to as Burcin's Galaxy. She was also a 2018 TED Fellow, and a 2020 TED Senior Fellow.

== Education ==
Mutlu-Pakdil grew up in Turkey, where she loved physics and the night sky. She attended Beşiktaş Atatürk Anatolian High School and was the first generation of her family to attend college. She completed her undergraduate studies in physics at Bilkent University in 2009. She moved to Texas Tech University for her graduate studies, gaining a master's degree in physics in 2012. In 2017 she earned her PhD in astrophysics with the dissertation Testing Supermassive Black Hole Scaling Relations Using Cosmological Simulations and Optical/Near-IR Imaging Data from University of Minnesota, Twin Cities.

== Research and career ==
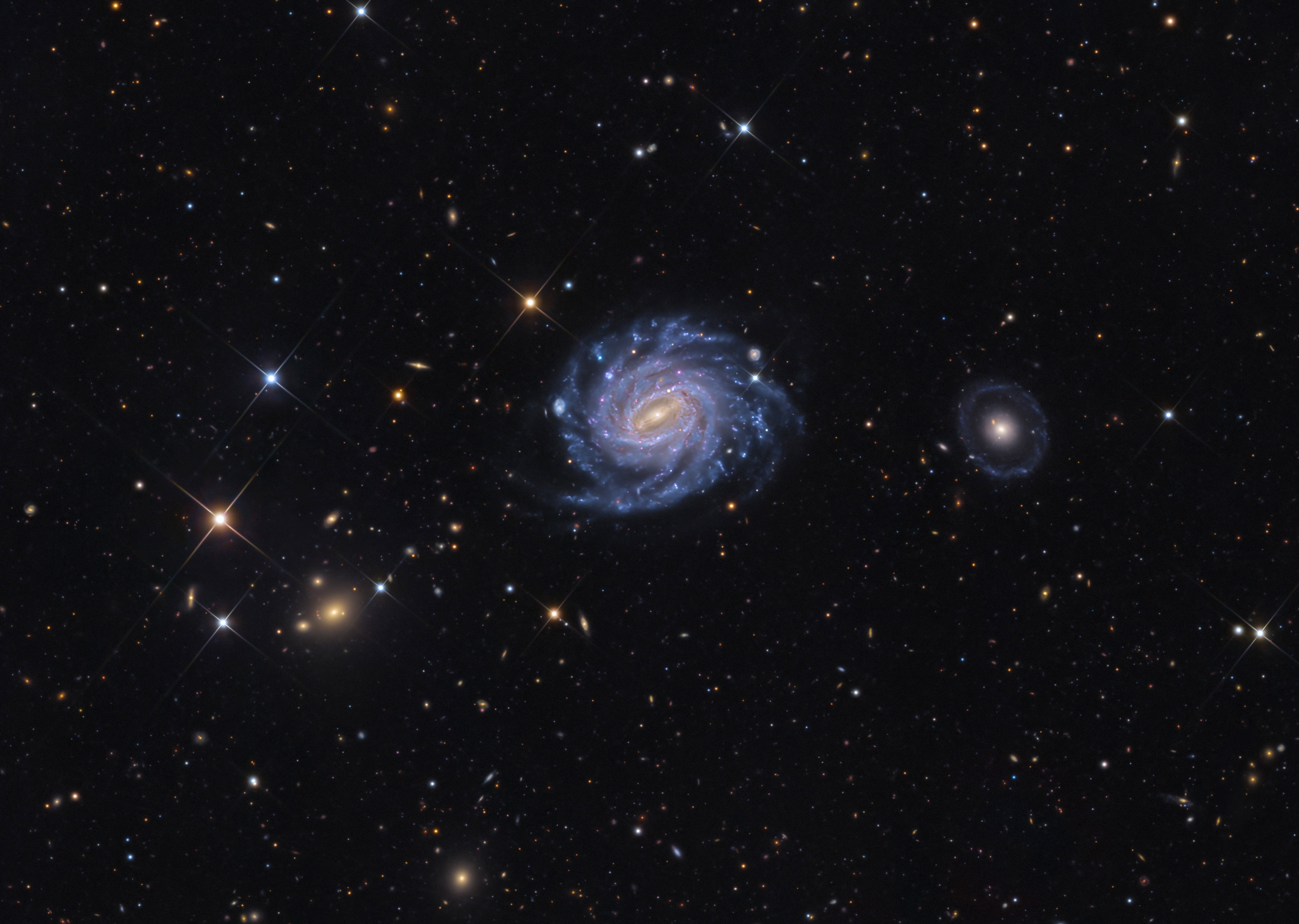
Burçins Galaxy (right of Spiral Galaxy NGC 3660)

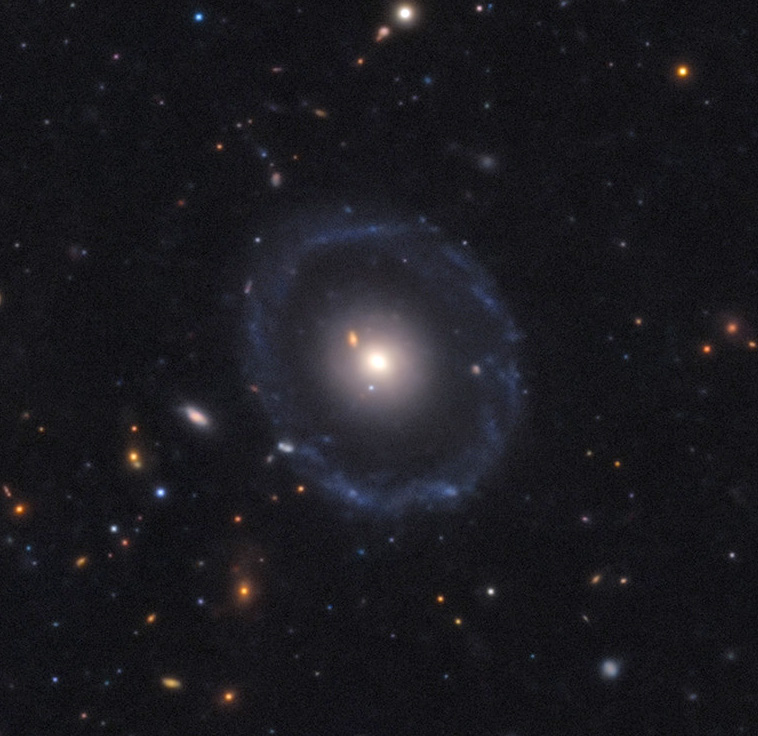
Close-up of Burcin's Galaxy

In 2017, Mutlu-Pakdil was appointed a postdoctoral research associate at University of Arizona. She worked at the Steward Observatory looking at the structure and dynamics of astrophysical objects, including dwarf galaxies, galactic rings and supermassive black holes. She used telescopes in Chile and Hawaii. At UA, she co-chaired the Women in Astronomy group. She was an American Astronomical Society ambassador.

During her doctoral studies, Mutlu-Pakdil discovered the galaxy PGC 1000714, which has been nicknamed "Burçin's galaxy". It is an extremely rare double ringed elliptical galaxy, and her discovery generated extensive media coverage.

She worked with the North Carolina Museum of Natural Sciences to create a series of short scientific films for the general public. In January 2018, Mutlu-Pakdil was announced as a TED Fellow. She gave a lecture at TED Vancouver in April, 2018. She is a campaigner for the increased representation of Muslim women in science.

In 2019, Mutlu-Pakdil was announced an AAAS IF/THEN Ambassador and in 2020 she became a TED Senior Fellow.

Burcin Mutlu-Pakdil is searching for the most peculiar objects in the Universe. In her own words, Mutlu-Pakdil uses "both large photometric surveys from ground-based and space telescopes in order to discover and characterize the smallest and faintest galaxies in the universe, and the role of dark matter in their formation."

== Awards and honours ==
- NSF Astronomy and Astrophysics Postdoctoral Fellow
- KICP Fellow
- 2020 TED Senior Fellow
- 2019 AAAS IF/THEN Ambassador
- 2018 Ten Outstanding Young Persons of the World – Academic Leadership and Accomplishment
- 2018 TED Fellow
- 2017 Ten Outstanding Young Persons, Turkey – Scientific Leadership Award
- 2017 APS Woman Physicist of July
- 2017 Linda Larson Woman of the Year
- 2016 Dr. Nancy "Rusty" Barceló Scholarship
