= NASA Infrared Telescope Facility =

Infrared telescope

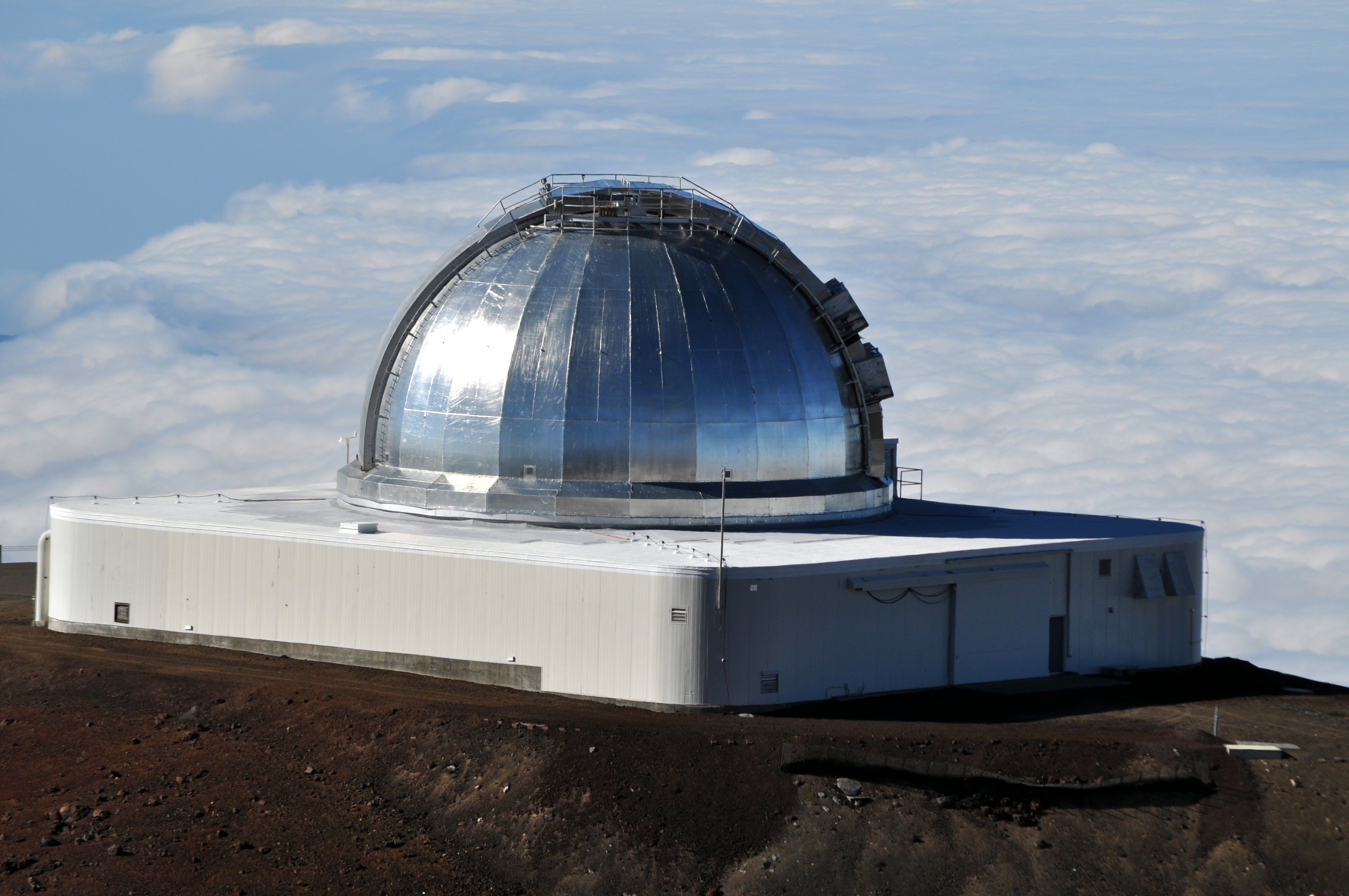
- Location: Hawaiʻi County, Hawaii
- Coordinates: 19°49′35″N 155°28′23″W
- Observatory code: T13
- Diameter: 126 in (3.2 m)
- Website: irtfweb.ifa.hawaii.edu
- Location within Hawaii
- Related media on Commons

The NASA Infrared Telescope Facility (NASA IRTF) is a 3.2-meter (10 ft) telescope optimized for use in infrared astronomy and located at the Mauna Kea Observatory in Hawaii. It was first built to support the Voyager missions and is now the US national facility for infrared astronomy, providing continued support to planetary, solar neighborhood, and deep space applications. The IRTF is operated by the University of Hawaii under a cooperative agreement with NASA. According to the IRTF's time allocation rules, at least 50% of the observing time is devoted to planetary science.

== Telescope ==
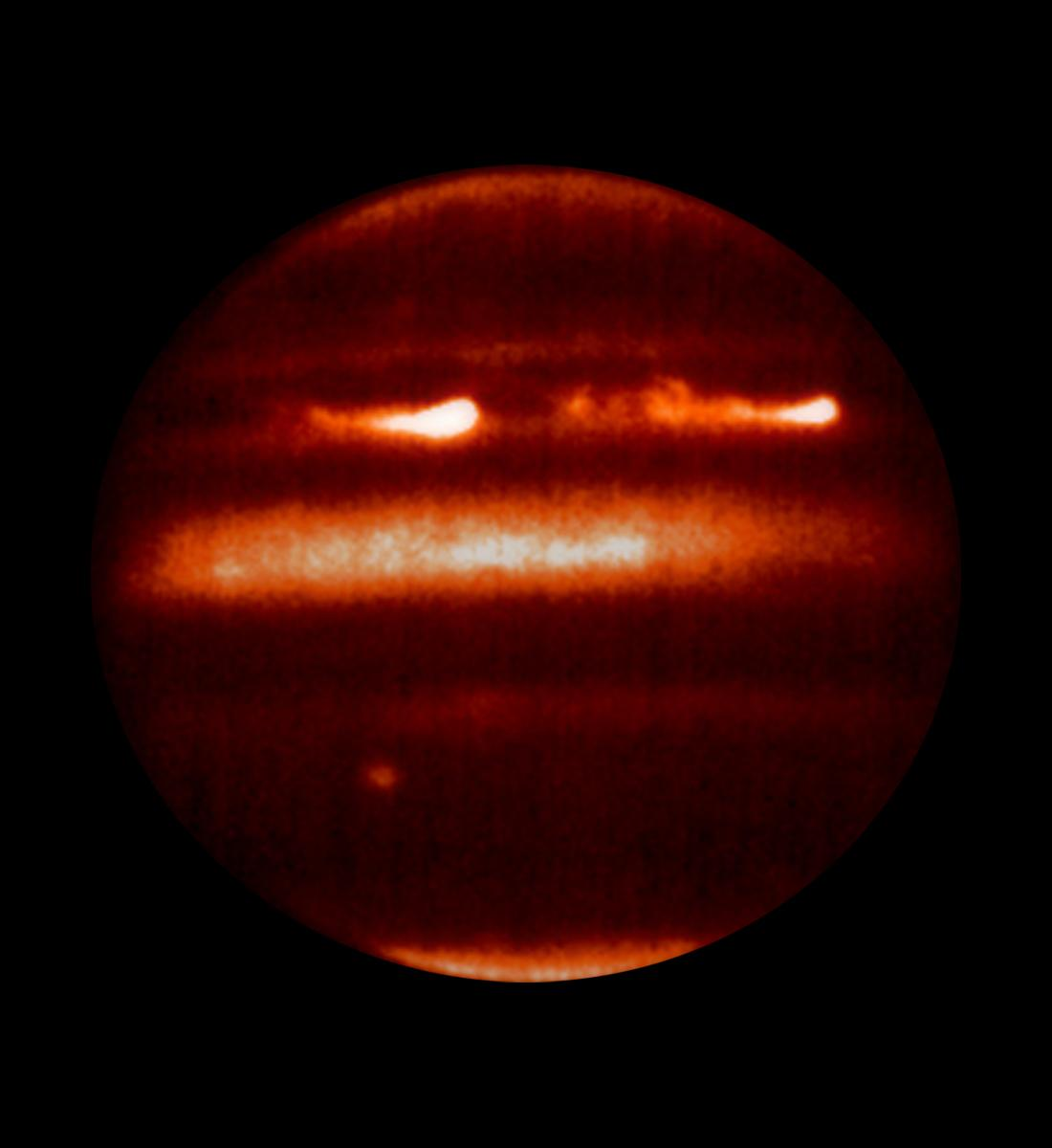
Thermal image of Jupiter obtained by NASA Infrared Telescope Facility in 2007

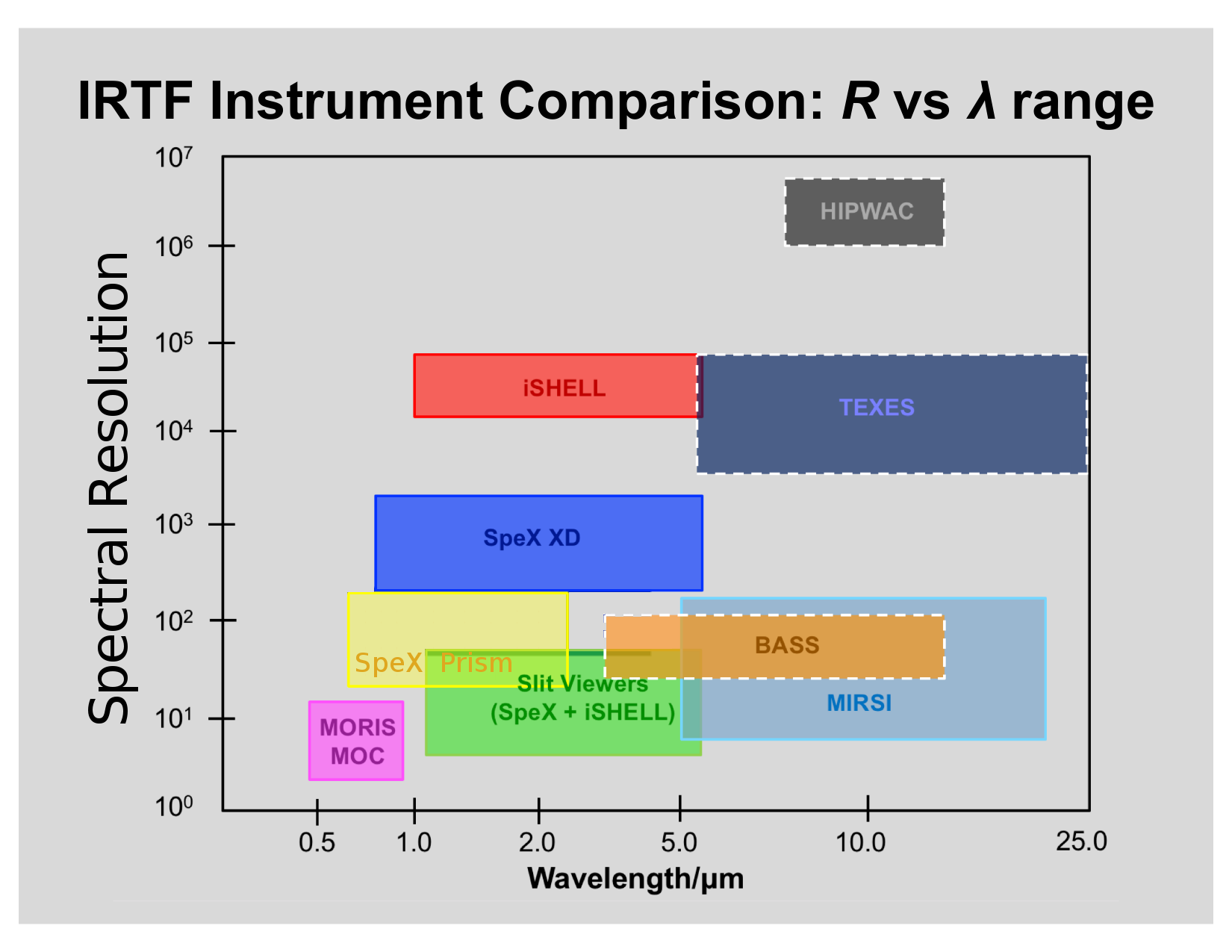
Spectroscopic capabilities of the IRTF instrument suite in terms of wavelength coverage and spectral resolution, as of late 2019. Imaging capabilities are not shown.

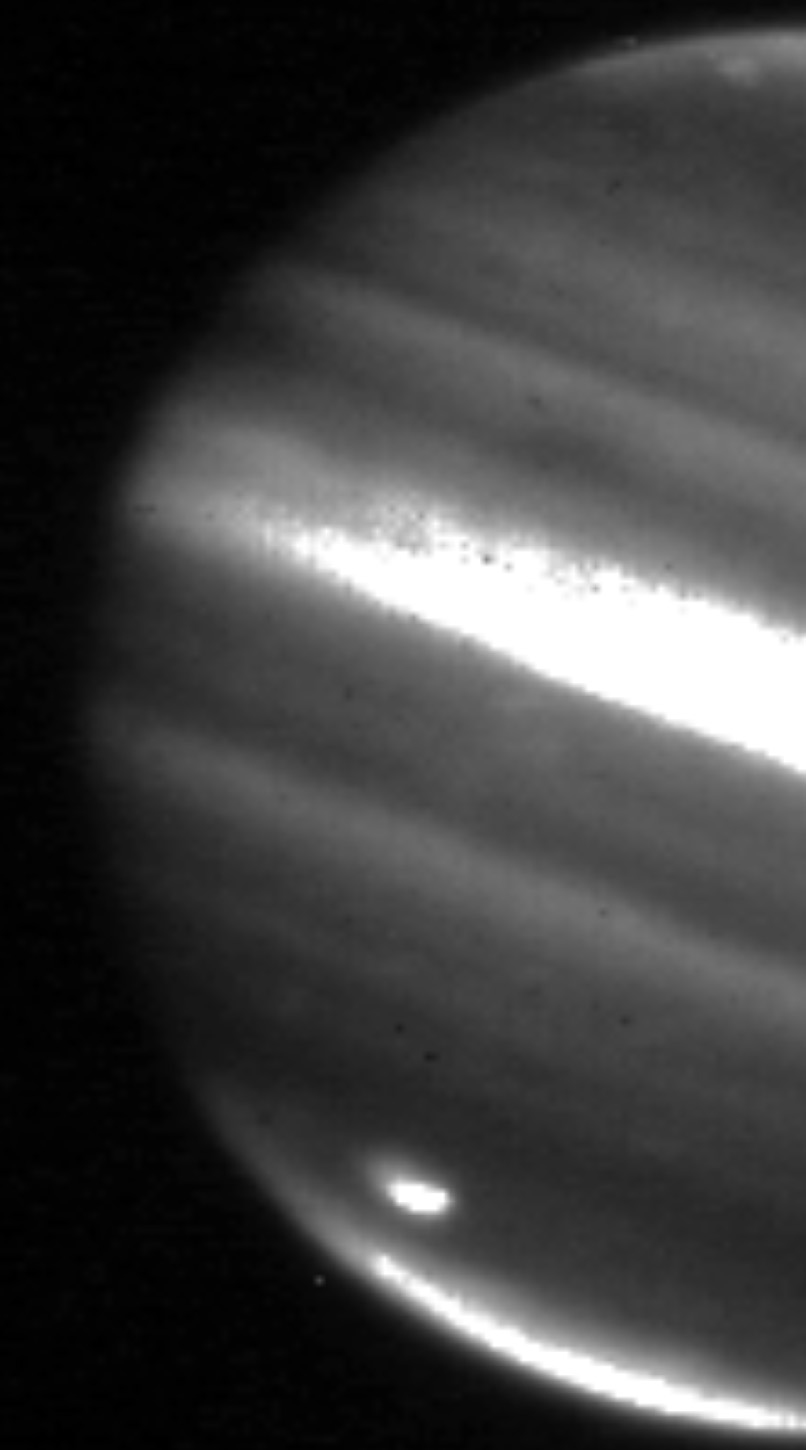
Near-infrared (H-band) image of Jupiter by IRTF, showing where the comet, Shoemaker-Levy 9, struck the planet (bright spot, lower half).

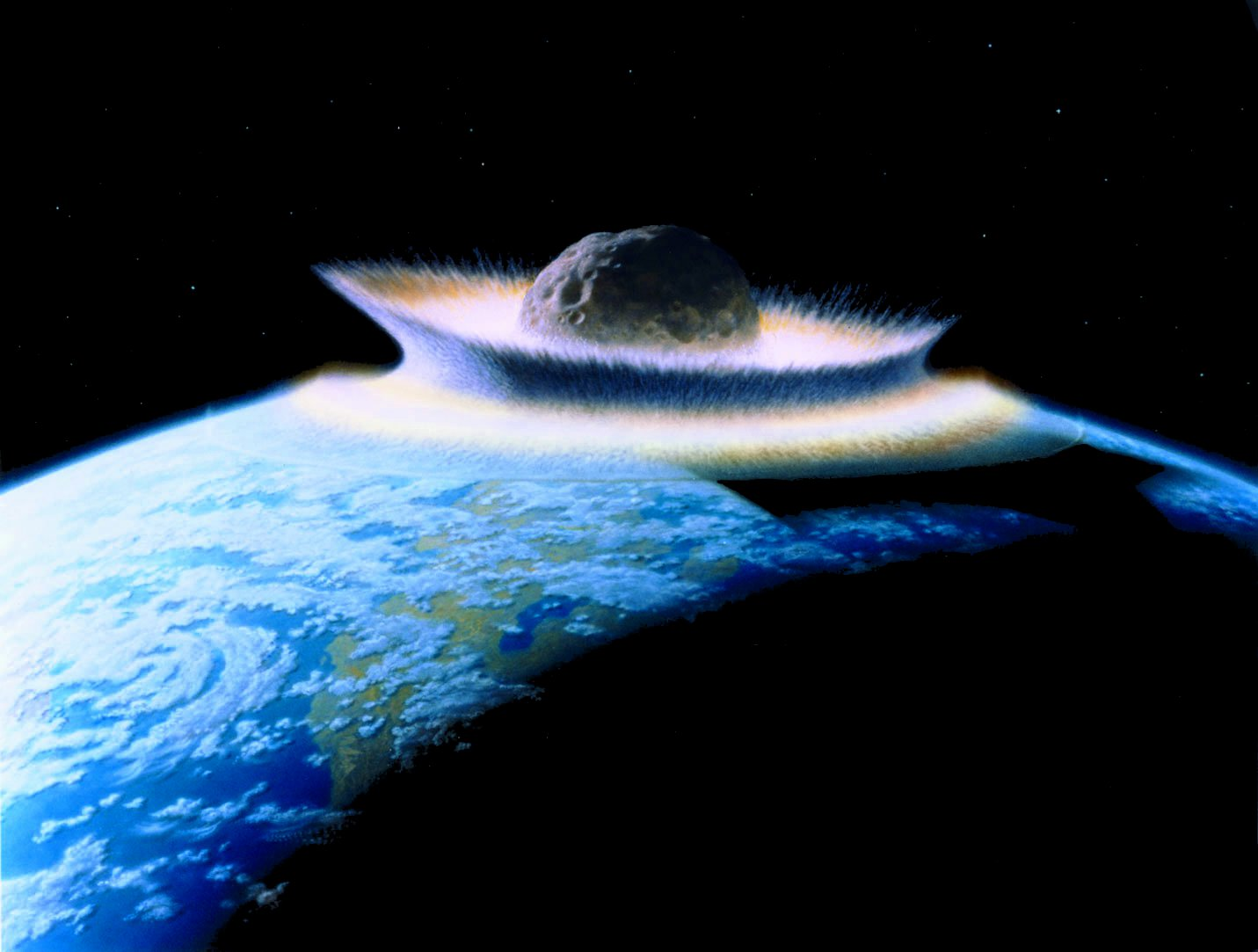
Asteroid collisions with Earth as visualized by the space Artist Don Davis

The IRTF is a 3.2 m (126") classical Cassegrain telescope. The Cassegrain focus f/ratio is f/38 and the primary mirror f/ratio is 2.5. Several aspects of the design of IRTF are optimized for IR observations. The secondary mirror is undersized to prevent the instrument from seeing the thermal emission from the telescope structure around the primary mirror. A small mirror in the center of the secondary mirror prevents the instrument from seeing its own thermal emission. The f/ratio is long to have a small secondary mirror, again to minimize the telescope's thermal emission. The mirror coatings are chosen to have minimal thermal emission. The emissivity of the telescope is usually below 4%. The secondary mirror is mounted on a chopping mechanism to rapidly switch the pointing of the telescope from target to sky at up to 4 Hz.

The IRTF is mounted on a large English yoke equatorial mount. The mount is very stiff, reducing flexure and allowing for accurate pointing of the telescope. Since the telescope is on an equatorial mount, the telescope can observe targets through the zenith without concern for field rotation. The yoke mount prevents the telescope from pointing north of +69 degrees declination. Since the telescope was primarily intended for planetary science, this restriction was considered to be acceptable. Since the telescope is on a heavy mounting, it is relatively immune from vibration or wind shake.

== Instrumentation ==
The IRTF hosts three facility instruments: SpeX/MORIS, iSHELL, and MIRSI/MOC. IRTF also hosts a number of visiting instruments.

=== SpeX ===
SpeX is a medium-resolution 0.7-5.4 μm spectrograph built at the Institute for Astronomy (IfA), for the NASA Infrared Telescope Facility (IRTF) on Mauna Kea. The primary scientific driver of SpeX was to provide maximum simultaneous wavelength coverage at a spectral resolving power which is well-matched to many planetary, stellar and galactic features, and at resolving power which adequately separates sky emission lines and disperses sky continuum. This requirement has resulted in an instrument which provides spectral resolutions of R~1000-2000 across 0.8-2.4 μm, 2.0-4.1 μm, and 2.3-5.5 μm, using prism cross-dispersers (15 arcsec-long slits). Single order long slit (60 arcsec) modes are also available. A high throughput prism mode is a provided for 0.8-2.5 μm spectroscopy at R~100 for solid state features and SEDs. A Teledyne 2048x2048 Hawaii-2RG infrared detector array is used in the spectrograph. SpeX also contains an infrared slit-viewer/guider covering a 60x60arcsec field-of-view at 0.12arcsec/pixel. A Raytheon Aladdin 2 512x512 InSb array in the infrared slit-viewer. The infrared slit viewer can also be used for imaging or photometry. SpeX is used for a wide array of planetary and astrophysical research programs and is the most requested instrument on IRTF. MORIS is a CCD camera fed by a dichroic in SpeX. It is used for visible imaging and as a visible guider for SpeX.

=== iSHELL ===
iSHELL is a 1 - 5.3 μm high resolution cross-dispersed echelle spectrograph which uses a 2048x2048 Hawaii-2RG infrared detector array. It replaced CSHELL; by using a larger array and a cross disperser, iShell has much larger wavelength coverage per setting than did CSHELL. iShell uses a silicon immersion grating to achieve a high dispersion with a relatively small grating, which in turn allows the optics and the whole instrument to be much smaller than if it used a conventional grating. Thus, despite having much higher spectral resolution than SpeX, iShell will be slightly smaller. There will be two immersion gratings, one optimized for K band and one optimized for L band. Due to the silicon grating, iShell will not be sensitive to light shorter than 1 μm. Each pixel is 0.125" on the sky and the spectroscopic dispersion is 80,000 when used with a 0.375" slit. Five slits from 0.375" to 4.0" are available for use. iSHELL also has an IR imaging mode and IR guiding camera, which covers a 42" diameter field. As of 2019, iSHELL was the second-most heavily used instrument at IRTF (after SpeX).

=== MIRSI ===
MIRSI is a 2.2 to 25 μm thermal infrared imaging camera with grism spectrographic capability. MIRSI was built by Boston University and upgraded by IRTF staff. The optics operate at 20k and the 320x240 Si:As BIB detector at 5K with cooling from a Sumitomo closed-cycle cooler. MIRSI has a selection of broad-band and narrow-band filters, as well as a CVF. MOC is a CCD camera fed by a dichroic in MIRSI. Simultaneous visible and MIR photometry with MOC and MIRSI is used to measure asteroid albedos and hence sizes.

=== MORIS ===
MORIS (MIT Optical Rapid Imaging System) s a high-speed, visible-wavelength camera for use on IRTF using an electron multiplying CCD. MORIS is mounted on the side window of SpeX, and is fed by the internal cold dichroic in SpeX. The design is based on POETS (Portable Occultation, Eclipse, and Transit Systems), which were developed by a collaboration between MIT and Williams College. MORIS is available for open use on IRTF and its user interface has been converted to the IRTF standard interface. In addition to visible light photometry, MORIS is also used as a visible light guider for SpeX, allowing guiding on targets as faint as V=20. The guiding software includes atmospheric dispersion correction to move the visible light guide box to keep the IR image on the SpeX slit.

=== Visiting instruments ===
IRTF also hosts a number of visitor instruments, usually thermal infrared spectrographs. These have included TEXES, EXES, BASS, and HIPWAC.

=== Future instruments ===
The IRTF staff are currently developing SPECTRE, a one-shot 0.4 - 4.2 μm seeing-limited integral field unit R=150 spectrograph .

=== Past instruments ===
CSHELL was retired when iSHELL began operations at IRTF. CSHELL was a 1 - 5.5 μm high resolution single-order echelle spectrograph which uses a 256 x 256 pixel InSb detector array. Each pixel was 0.2" on the sky and the spectroscopic dispersion is 100,000 per pixel. Slits from 0.5" to 4.0" provided spectral resolutions of up to 30,000. CSHELL also had an IR imaging mode for source acquisition which covers a 30" x 30" field. An internal CCD with a 1' FOV allows for guiding.

NSFCAM2 was a 1-5 μm camera, built at the Institute for Astronomy, (IfA), for the NASA Infrared Telescope Facility (IRTF). The camera used a 2048x2048 Hawaii 2RG detector array. The image scale was 0.04 arcsec/pixel and the field of view is 82x82 arcsec. It contained two filter wheels. The first was a 28 position wheel containing broad-band and narrow-band filters, and a wire-grid polarizer. The second contained a 1.5-5 μm CVF and grisms. for low-resolution spectroscopy. A third wheel, located at the F/38 telescope focal plane inside the camera, contained grism slits and field lenses. An external wheel containing a waveplate could be used with a polarizer in the CVF wheel for polarimetry. NSFCam2 was taken off of the telescope in Fall 2012 to upgrade its array to a higher quality engineering grade Hawaii 2RG array with a new array controller. As of 2019, NSFCam2 is no longer available for use at the IRTF.

== Remote observing ==
The majority of IRTF users prefer to use IRTF remotely. Observers can use IRTF from any location with a high speed internet connection, such as their office or home, anywhere around the world. The observer controls the instrument via a VNC session, just as they would at the summit, and communicates with the telescope operator via phone, Polycom, or Zoom. The observer logs in and controls the telescope personally during their time allocation. Remote observing has several advantages. Observers are spared the time and cost of traveling from their home institution to Hawaii. In the past, when observers traveled to the telescope, the telescope time was scheduled in full nights, and when allotted multiple nights, close together in time to limit travel. With remote observing, observers can submit requests for half- and quarter-nights, instead of asking for whole nights. Since the observers do not travel to Hawaii, they can also request to use the telescope more frequently. This has enabled the IRTF to support many programs where frequent observations of targets are necessary, such as weekly monitoring of solar system objects. Remote observing has also allowed the IRTF to support target-of-opportunity (ToO) programs. These are programs of high scientific merit where the timing of the observation cannot be predicted at the time that telescope is scheduled. Examples include supernovae, which explode unexpectedly, or near-earth asteroids that may be discovered shortly before their closest approach to the Earth. Although the observers are usually remote, the telescope operator is at the summit to ensure the safety of the facility, focus the telescope and other duties not left to the observer, assist the observer, and troubleshoot problems that may arise during the night.

== Observations ==
NASA's Infrared Telescope Facility (IRTF) also made observations of P/2016 BA14, which is a comet that came within about 9 lunar distances of Earth in 2016.

== Comparison to contemporaries ==
NASA IRTF was built at the same time as the United Kingdom Infrared Telescope; John Jefferies of the Institute for Astronomy, which built the first telescope in the area, said "it has been sometimes a source of embarrassment ... that there are two of them at the same place at the same time. The natural question is asked, Why two? Why don't you build one and share it?".

Dedicated infrared telescopes require a high and dry location, special instrumentation, and similar high-quality mirrors and optics as for visible wavelength observations. Other large optical infrared and near-infrared telescopes circa 1980:

Infra Red Telescopes (IRT)
#	Name(s) / Observatory	Image	Aperture	Spectrum	Altitude	First Light
1	United Kingdom Infrared Telescope; Joint Astronomy Centre		380 cm (150 in)	Infrared	4,205 m (13,796 ft)	1979
2	ESO 3.6 m Telescope; ESO La Silla Obs.		357 cm (141 in)	Visible; Infrared	2,400 m (7,874 ft)	1977
3	NASA Infrared Telescope Facility; Mauna Kea Observatory		320 cm (126 in)	Infrared	4,205 m (13,796 ft)	1979

There have been two other smaller near-infrared telescopes: the 150 cm (59 in) Gornergrat Infrared Telescope in the Swiss Alps, and the 160 cm (63 in) telescope at the Mont Mégantic Observatory in Canada.

== Location ==
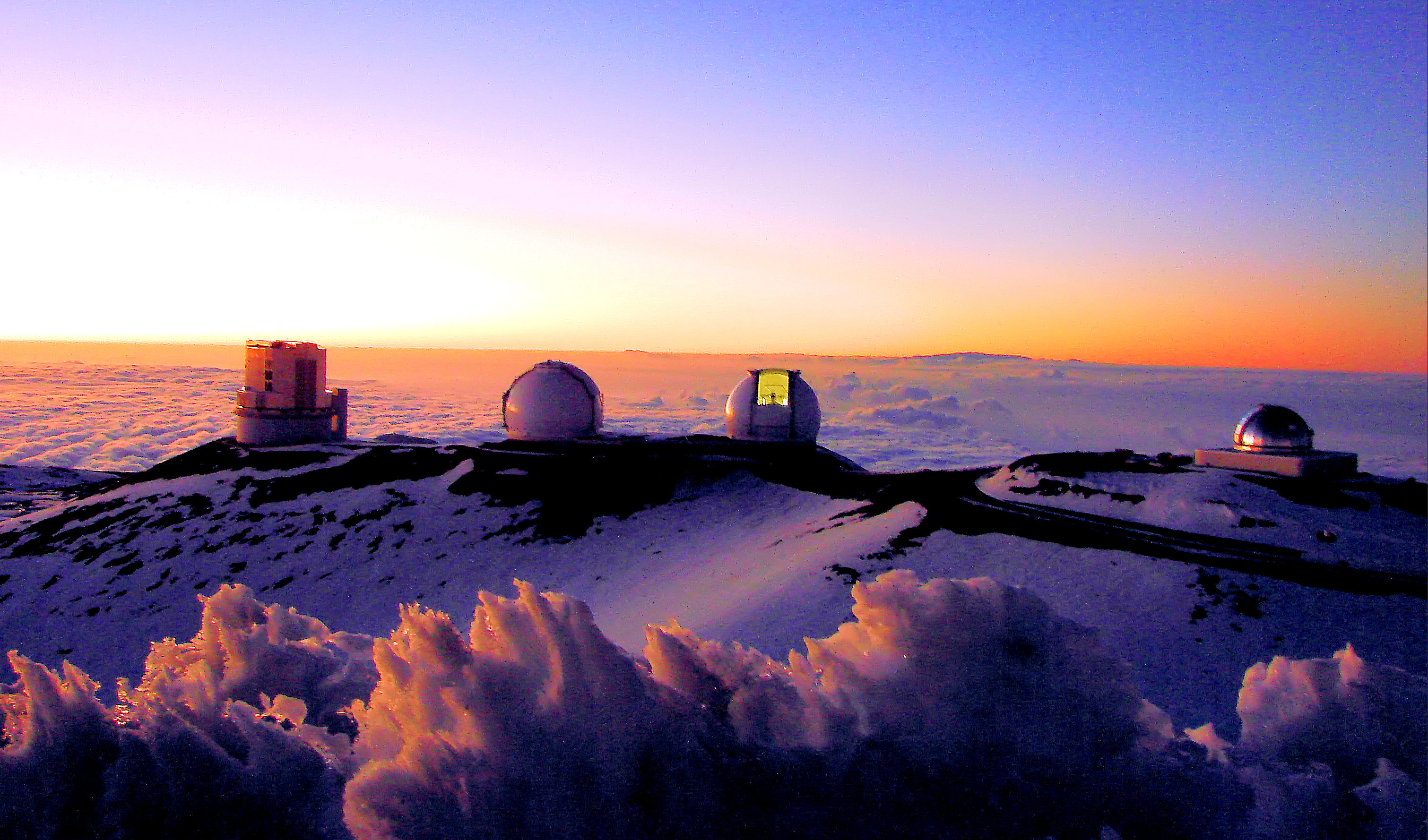
Maunakea summit on Hawaii. Pictured (left to right) are Subaru Telescope, Keck I and Keck II, and IRTF.

== See also ==
- List of largest optical reflecting telescopes
- List of largest infrared telescopes
