= Joint Astronomy Centre =

Observatory in Hawaii, US

- Organization: Science and Technology Facilities Council
- Location: Hilo, Hawaii
- Coordinates: 19.70167°N 155.09011°W
- Website: jach.hawaii.edu

Telescopes
- United Kingdom Infrared Telescope (UKIRT): Infrared
- James Clerk Maxwell Telescope: Submillimeter
- Location within Hawaii

The Joint Astronomy Centre (JAC) was a management organisation based in Hilo, Hawaii, which from c.1980-2015 operated two large telescopes at Mauna Kea Observatory on behalf of an international consortium from the United Kingdom, Canada and the Netherlands, and provided support for other telescopes and public outreach activities. The JAC also maintained the Starlink Project between 2006 and 2015. Following withdrawal of funding by the partner nations, on March 1, 2015, the Joint Astronomy Centre closed and the facility was handed over to the East Asian Observatory which now runs the James Clerk Maxwell Telescope.

The major telescopes formerly operated by the JAC were:

1. The United Kingdom Infrared Telescope (UKIRT) - 3.8m diameter.
2. The James Clerk Maxwell Telescope - 15m diameter submillimeter telescope

== See also ==
- List of astronomical observatories
