= United Kingdom Infrared Telescope =

Infrared reflecting telescope in Hawaii

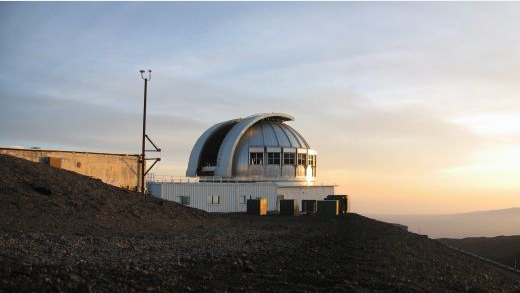
- Alternative names: UKIRT
- Location: Hawaiʻi County, Hawaii
- Coordinates: 19°49′21″N 155°28′14″W
- Observatory code: T11
- Wavelength: 30 μm (10.0 THz)
- Diameter: 3.8 m (12 ft 6 in)
- Website: about.ifa.hawaii.edu/ukirt/
- Location within Hawaii
- Related media on Commons

The United Kingdom Infra-Red Telescope (UKIRT) is a 3.8 metre (150 inch) infrared reflecting telescope, the second largest dedicated infrared (1 to 30 micrometres) telescope in the world. It is located on Mauna Kea, Hawai'i as part of Mauna Kea Observatory. Until 2014 it was operated by the Joint Astronomy Centre in Hilo and was owned by the United Kingdom Science and Technology Facilities Council. UKIRT is currently being funded by NASA and operated under scientific cooperation between Lockheed Martin Advanced Technology Center, the University of Hawaii, and the U. S. Naval Observatory. The telescope is set to be decommissioned after completion of the Thirty Meter Telescope as part of the Mauna Kea Comprehensive Management Plan.

Decommissioning of UKIRT started on July 7th, 2025 and the final science operations were on 15 September 2026.

== Design ==
Like related telescopes on Tenerife, it is a Cassegrain device with a thin primary mirror, around 2/3 thinner than in other contemporary devices and weighing only 6.5 tonnes. When trying to view distant objects in the infrared, local sources of heat must be minimised and a lighter mirror requires lower power motors and control systems thus creating less heat. The mirror is held in a massive steel 'cell' of 20 tonnes which is linked to the supports by Serrurier trusses. The mirror's accuracy, despite its very low weight and thickness, was partly achieved by sitting it on concentric circles of aluminum pistons/air cells, 80 in all. Computer control of these pneumatic pistons enabled stresses in the glass to be canceled out effectively modeling the behavior of a much thicker mirror. This novel technique resulted in optical performance considerably better than the procurement specification. The instrument was mounted on an 'English Equatorial mounting' or yoke which sits on ball-bearings on steel piers, swinging east–west and rotating around north–south. The geometry of the mount limits the telescopes access to objects between +60 and −40 degrees of declination but it is extremely sturdy and free from deformation and so allows very accurate pointing. The entire structure was built on massive ball bearings held rigid by shear pins to afford earthquake protection. Pointing control of the axis was provided by pairs of printed circuit motors driven in opposition to cancel backlash controlled by a DEC PDP11/40 computer system.

== History ==
The telescope was built between 1975 and 1978 – the mechanical systems by Dunford Hadfields Limited of Sheffield and the optics by Grubb Parsons of Newcastle. Originally known as the Infrared Flux Collector, it began operations in October 1979.

Built at the same time was the NASA Infrared Telescope Facility. John Jefferies of the Institute for Astronomy, which built the first telescope in the area, said "it has been sometimes a source of embarrassment ... that there are two of them at the same place at the same time. The natural question is asked, Why two? Why don't you build one and share it?".

With the delivery of the wide-field imager WFCAM in 2004, UKIRT began a revolutionary large-scale sky survey (the UKIRT Infrared Deep Sky Survey, UKIDSS). This project takes some 80% of the available telescope time in wide-field mode. Wide-field mode itself takes some 60% of the telescope with the other 40% devoted to operations with the Cassegrain instrumentation. In December 2008 it was announced that the telescope would be moving to wide-field mode full-time .

Since December 13, 2010, UKIRT has been operated remotely from Hilo in a minimalist operation mode with no observers present. Most of the time is allocated to the UKIRT Infrared Deep Sky Survey, but about 60 nights per year are used by Korean institutes.

A UKIRT infrared survey was used to discover a redshift distance record breaking Quasar in 2011. The quasar could not be seen in visible light, but could in the longer wavelengths observed by UKIRT. The UKIDSS observations allowed astronomers to find the most distant quasar in 2011. It took five years to find this item but once found, other telescopes such as the VLT further analyzed it.

== Instrumentation ==
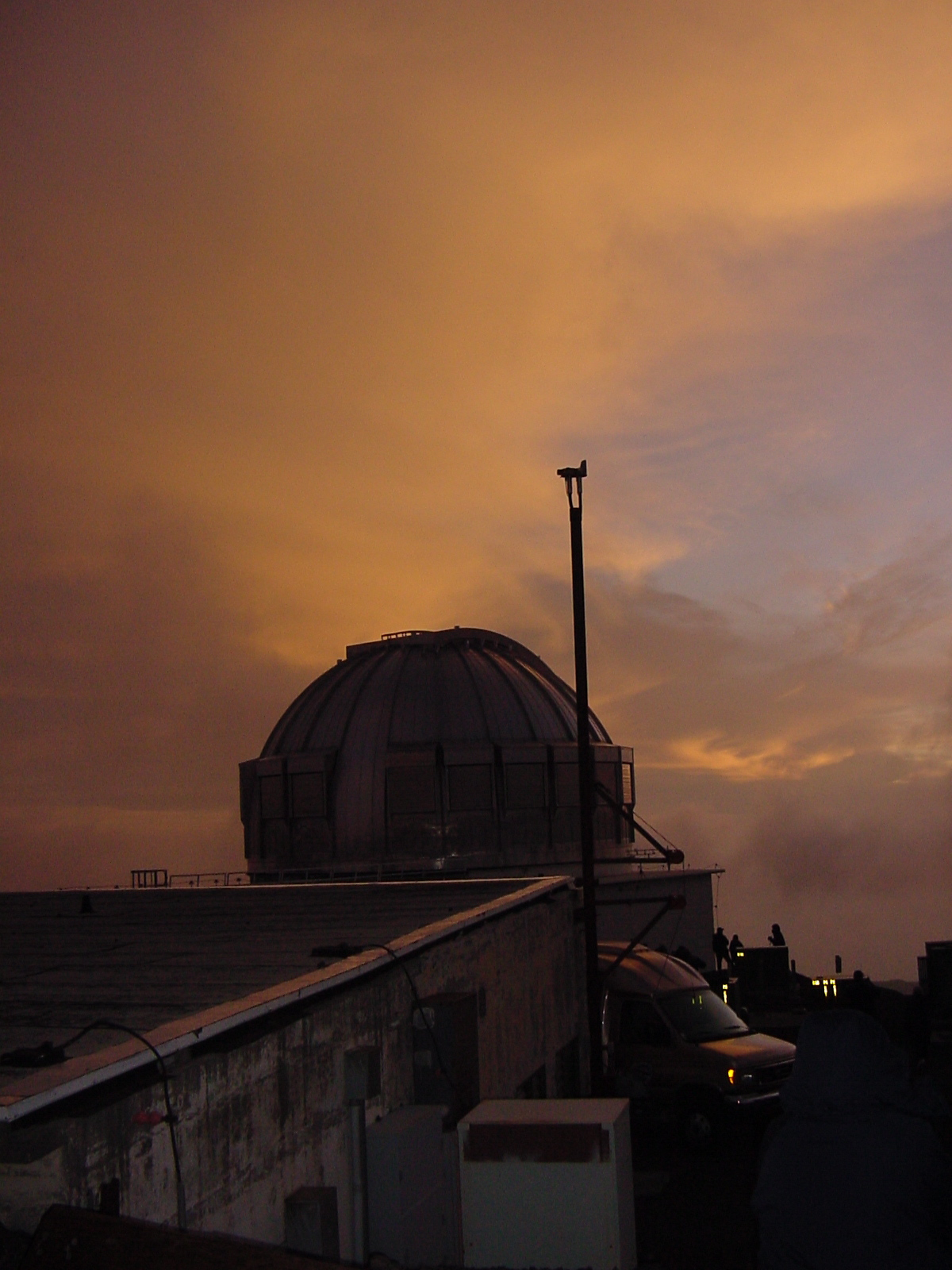
UKIRT at sunset

UKIRT has four Cassegrain instruments of which 3 can be on the telescope at the same time and a wide-field imager placed forward of the Cassegrain focus.

- CGS4 is a cooled-grating spectrometer with a 90-arcsecond long slit, at spectral resolutions between about 1,000 and 30,000.
- Michelle is a 320x240 pixel mid-infrared imager/spectrometer operating between 10 and 20 micrometres.
- UFTI is a 1024x1024 pixel imager operating between 0.8 and 2.5 micrometres.
- UIST is a 1024x1024 pixel imager/spectrometer operating between 0.8 and 5 micrometres, and offering an integral field mode 3x6 arcseconds in size.
- WFCAM (at forward Cassegrain) is a wide-field imager with four 2048x2048 arrays, each of which covers a field 13.6 arcminutes on a side, for a total field of view of about 0.2 square degrees.

== Upgrades ==
Though it was built inexpensively, UKIRT has been extensively upgraded. A program of improvements from 1990 to 1998 greatly improved the imaging performance, and in 2001 the telescope delivered median infrared seeing ranging from 0.8 arcseconds at dusk to 0.5 arcseconds in the early morning. Between 1998 and 2003, two major software projects were undertaken – the ORAC project providing a major upgrade to the user interface and automating telescope operations, and the OMP providing a comprehensive observation database and data feedback mechanisms. Since 2003, using these two software enhancements, UKIRT has carried out highly efficient flexible scheduling – tailoring observation execution to the prevailing weather conditions. Observations are selected from the database according to the current seeing, atmospheric water vapor, sky transparency, and a science priority allocated by the telescope time allocation panel.

== Research ==
In July 2006, UKIRT released the DR1 data set for the United Kingdom Infrared Telescope Infrared Deep Sky Survey.

== Continuing operations ==
It was announced on 16 December 2009 that the telescope was "subject to discussions leading to managed withdrawal". In 2012, its shutdown for end of the 2013 was announced. The possibility of transfer was noted as a possibility. On October 30, 2014 the telescope ownership was transferred to the University of Hawaii. It is now operated under a Scientific Cooperation Agreement among the University of Arizona, the University of Hawaii and Lockheed Martin Advanced Technology Center (LM-ATC). Funding for operations is currently being provided by the NASA Orbital Debris Program Office. Steward Observatory at the University of Arizona is responsible for daily operations and scientific productivity. Technical support is provided by the East Asian Observatory, the successor organization operating the James Clerk Maxwell Telescope. In addition to NASA mission support, observing time is provided to astronomers and planetary scientists at the University of Hawaii and University of Arizona and researchers at LM-ATC. The UK continues to provide support for data pipelines and archives for the Wide-Field Camera and receives a share of the time for survey projects of joint interest.

== See also ==
- List of largest infrared telescopes
- List of most distant astronomical objects
- Redshift
- List of largest optical telescopes in the 20th century
