= Maunakea Observatories =

Astronomical observatories in Hawaii

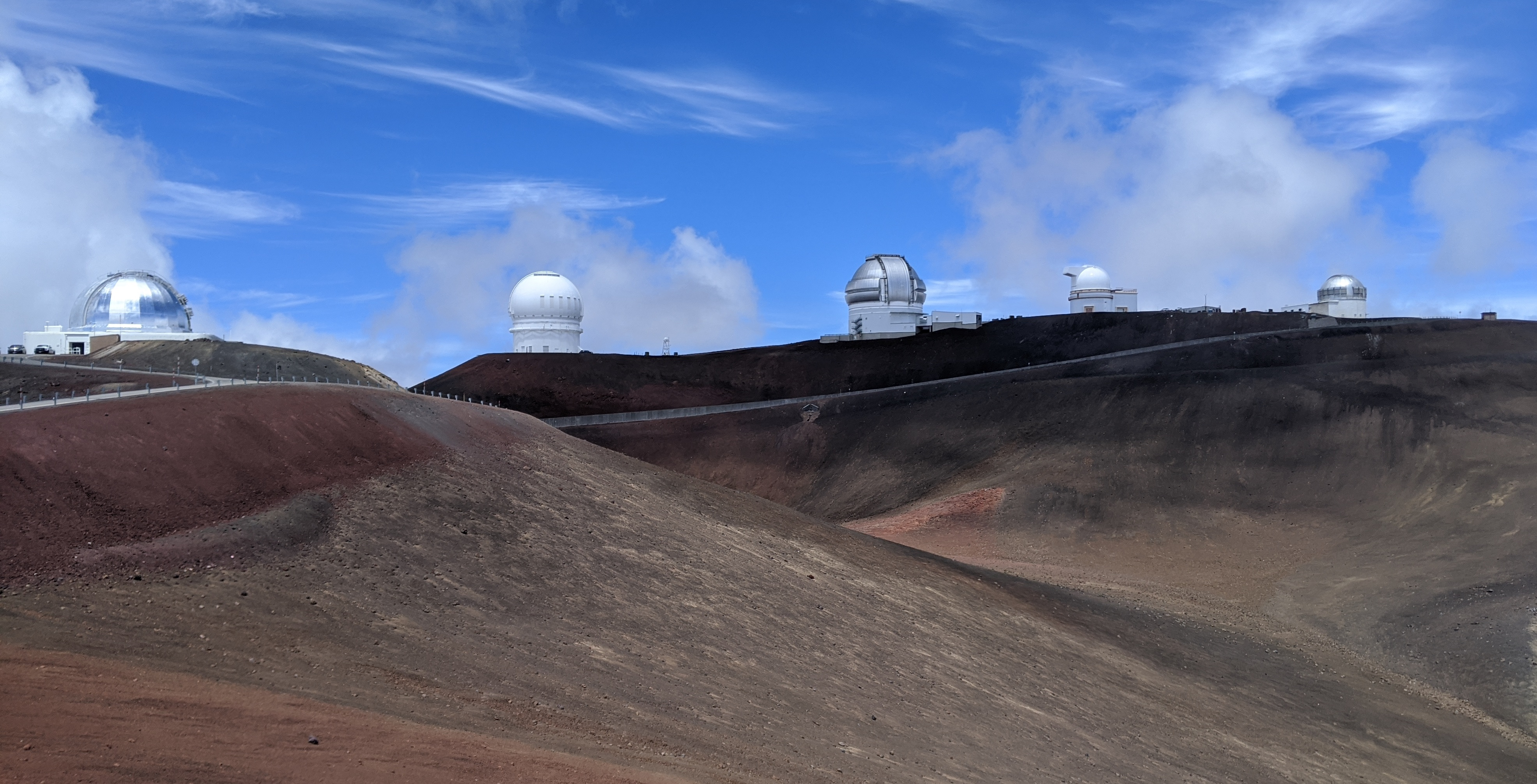
- Alternative names: MKO
- Observatory code: 568
- Location: Hawaiʻi County, Hawaii
- Coordinates: 19°49′20″N 155°28′30″W
- Altitude: 4,205 m (13,796 ft)
- Established: 1956
- Website: www.maunakeaobservatories.org

Telescopes
- CSO (closed 2015): 10.4 m submillimeter
- CFHT: 3.58 m visible/infrared
- Gemini North: 8.1 m visible/infrared
- IRTF: 3.0 m infrared
- JCMT: 15 m submillimeter
- Subaru Telescope: 8.2 m visible/infrared
- SMA: 8×6 m arrayed radio telescopes
- UKIRT: 3.8 m infrared
- VLBA receiver: 25 m radio telescope
- Keck Observatory: 2×10 m visible/infrared telescopes
- UH88: 2.2 m visible/infrared
- UH Hilo Hoku Ke'a Telescope: 0.9 m visible
- Location within Hawaii
- Related media on Commons

The Maunakea Observatories (MKO, also known as Mauna Kea Observatories) are a group of independent astronomical research facilities and large telescope observatories that are located at the summit of Mauna Kea on Hawaiʻi, United States. The facilities are located in a 525-acre (212 ha) special land use zone known as the "Astronomy Precinct", which is located within the 11,228-acre (4,544 ha) Mauna Kea Science Reserve. The Astronomy Precinct was established in 1967 and is located on land protected by the Historical Preservation Act for its significance to Hawaiian culture. The presence and continued construction of telescopes is highly controversial due to Mauna Kea's centrality in native Hawaiian religion and culture, as well as for a variety of environmental reasons.

The location is nearly ideal because of its dark skies from lack of light pollution, good astronomical seeing due to low atmospheric turbulence, low humidity, high elevation of 4,207 m (13,802 ft), position above most of the water vapor in the atmosphere, clean air, low cloud cover and low latitude location.

== Origin and background ==
Significantly predating the current observatories, there is evidence of active astronomy on Mauna Kea in the 1901 Land Office Map of the Island of Hawaii showing the "Hawaii Astronomy Station" near the Mauna Kea summit.

After studying photos for NASA's Apollo program that contained greater detail than any ground-based telescope, Gerard Kuiper began seeking an arid site for infrared studies. While he first began looking in Chile, he also made the decision to perform tests in the Hawaiian Islands. Tests on Maui's Haleakalā were promising, but the mountain was too low in the inversion layer and often covered by clouds. On the "Big Island" of Hawaiʻi, Mauna Kea is considered the second-highest island mountain in the world. While the summit is often covered with snow, the air is extremely dry. Kuiper began looking into the possibility of an observatory on Mauna Kea. After testing, he discovered the low humidity was perfect for infrared signals. He persuaded Hawaiʻi Governor John A. Burns to bulldoze a dirt road to the summit, where he built a small telescope on Puʻu Poliʻahu, a cinder cone peak. The peak was the second highest on the mountain, with the highest peak being holy ground, so Kuiper avoided it. Next, Kuiper tried enlisting NASA to fund a larger facility with a large telescope, housing and other needed structures. NASA, in turn, decided to make the project open to competition. Professor of physics, John Jefferies of the University of Hawaii, placed a bid on behalf of the university. Jefferies had gained his reputation through observations at Sacramento Peak Observatory. The proposal was for a two-meter telescope to serve both the needs of NASA and the university. While large telescopes are not ordinarily awarded to universities without well-established astronomers, Jefferies and UH were awarded the NASA contract, infuriating Kuiper, who felt that "his mountain" had been "stolen" from him. Kuiper would abandon his site (the very first telescope on Mauna Kea) over the competition and begin work in Arizona on a different NASA project. After considerable testing by Jefferies' team, the best locations were determined to be near the summit of the cinder cones. Testing also determined Mauna Kea to be superb for nighttime viewing due to many factors, including the thin air, constant trade winds and being surrounded by the sea. Jefferies would build a 2.24-meter telescope with the State of Hawaiʻi agreeing to build a reliable, all-weather roadway to the summit. Building began in 1967, and first light was seen in 1970.

Other groups began requesting subleases on the newly accessible mountaintop. By 1970, two 24 in (0.6 m) telescopes had been constructed by the United States Air Force and Lowell Observatory. In 1973, Canada and France agreed to build the 3.6 m CFHT on Mauna Kea. However, local organizations started to raise concerns about the environmental impact of the observatory. This led the Department of Land and Natural Resources to prepare an initial management plan, drafted in 1977 and supplemented in 1980. In January 1982, the University of Hawaiʻi Board of Regents approved a plan to support the continued development of scientific facilities at the site. In 1998, 2,033 acres (823 ha) were transferred from the observatory lease to supplement the Mauna Kea Ice Age Reserve. The 1982 plan was replaced in 2000 by an extension designed to serve until 2020: it instituted an Office of Mauna Kea Management, designated 525 acres (212 ha) for astronomy, and shifted the remaining 10,763 acres (4,356 ha) to "natural and cultural preservation". This plan was further revised to address concerns expressed in the Hawaiian community that a lack of respect was being shown toward the cultural value the mountain embodied to the region's indigenous people.

As of 2012, the Mauna Kea Science Reserve has 13 observation facilities, each funded by as many as 11 countries. It is one of the world's premier observatories for optical, infrared, and submillimeter astronomy, In 2009 was the largest measured by light gathering power. There are nine telescopes working in the visible and infrared spectrum, three in the submillimeter spectrum, and one in the radio spectrum, with mirrors or dishes ranging from 0.9 to 25 m (3 to 82 ft). In comparison, the Hubble Space Telescope has a 2.4 m (7.9 ft) mirror, similar in size to the UH88, now the second smallest telescope on the mountain.

=== Controversies ===
Planned new telescopes, including the Thirty Meter Telescope, have attracted controversy due to their potential cultural and ecological impact. The multi-telescope "outrigger" extension to the Keck telescopes, which required new sites, was eventually cancelled. Three or four of the mountain's 13 existing telescopes must be dismantled over the next decade, with the TMT proposal to be the last area on Mauna Kea on which any telescope would ever be built.
With all the controversy, the building of telescopes has led to the creation of the Hawaii Night Sky Protection Act. As artificial light forms a light cloud above the land, the excess light disrupts the clear pictures taken by the telescopes. On July 1, 2013, the Hawaii Night Sky Protection Act was initiated, affecting both the Big Island and Maui. A large difference between the Hawaiian islands and the mainland United States can be observed: street lighting. Almost all streets are dark as the lamps have either not been built, have been removed, or have been dimmed.

=== Scientific discoveries ===
In 2003, scientists discovered (612584) 2003 QX113 with the Canada–France Ecliptic Plane Survey. In November 2020, in collaboration with Europe's low-frequency ARray radio telescope, Maunakea's Gemini observatory and the NASA Infrared Telescope Facility (NITF), discovered the first Super-Planet.

In October 2011, the Nobel Prize in Physics was awarded to Saul Perlmutter, Brian P. Schmidt, and Adam G. Riess; the prize recognized their findings, based on research on supernovae at the observatories, that dark energy is a force causing the universe to expand at an accelerating rate.

== Management ==
The Reserve was established in 1968 and is leased by the State of Hawaiʻi's Department of Land and Natural Resources (DLNR). The University of Hawaiʻi manages the site and leases land to several multi-national facilities, which have invested more than $2 billion in science and technology. The lease expires in 2033, and after that, 40 of 45 square kilometers (25 of 28 square miles) revert to the state of Hawaii. Currently, pressure has been placed on the University-based management. House Bill 2024 pushes for new stewardship on the summit. The area will be integrated in terms of management. Some land will be governed by the local community. The Bill pushes for future laws and regulations in terms of new buildings. As always, the cultural and environmental sites will be heavily recognized as a factor for consideration.

== Location ==
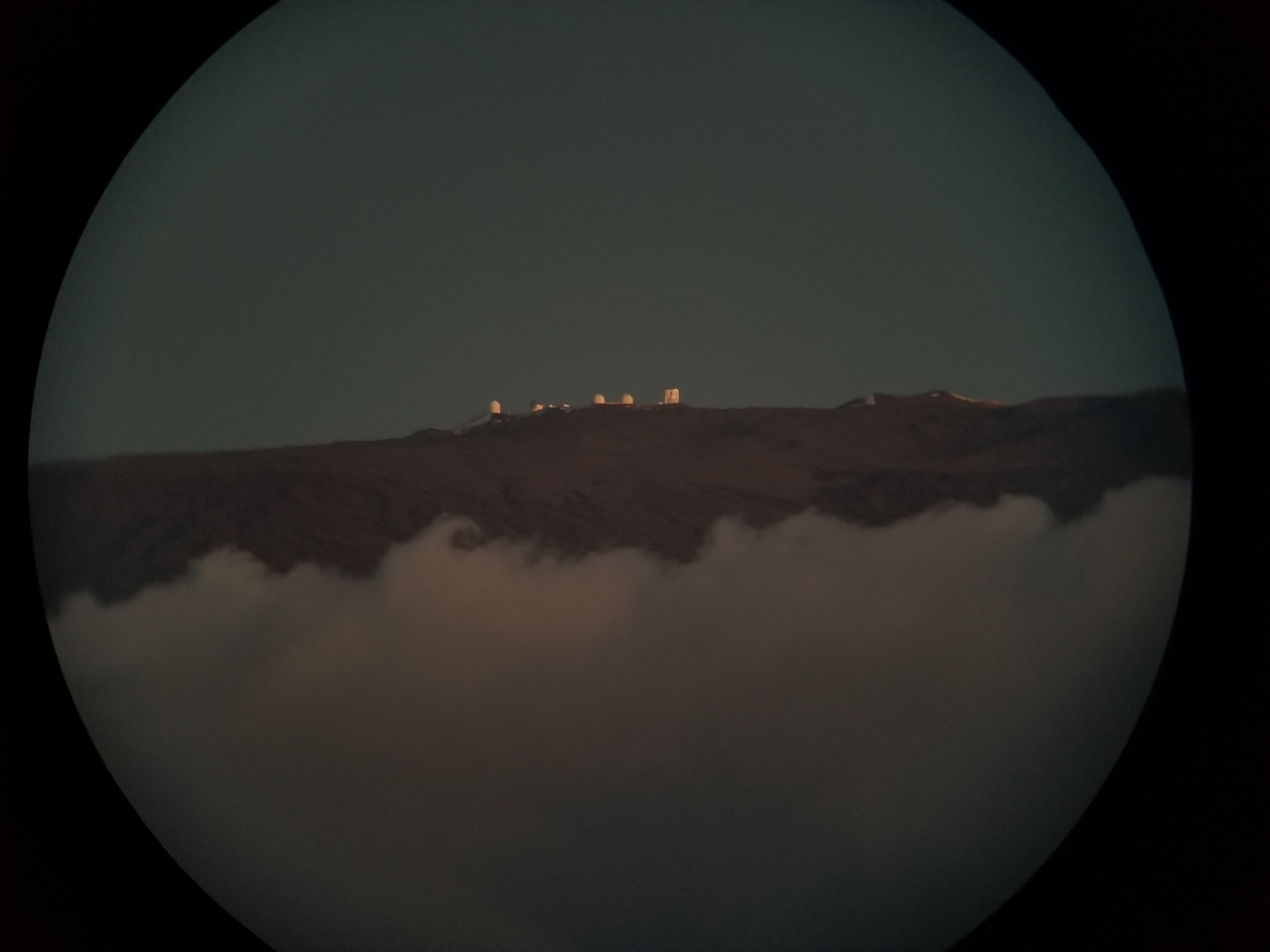
Maunakea Observatories seen from the base of Mauna Kea

The altitude and isolation in the middle of the Pacific Ocean make Mauna Kea one of the best locations on Earth for ground-based astronomy. It is an ideal location for submillimeter, infrared and optical observations. The statistics show that Mauna Kea is the best site in terms of optical and infrared image quality; for example, the CFHT site has a median seeing of 0.43 arcseconds.

Accommodations for research astronomers are located at the Onizuka Center for International Astronomy (often called Hale Pōhaku), 7 miles (11 km) by unpaved, steep road from the summit at 9,300 feet (2,800 m) above sea level.

An adjacent visitor information station is located at 9,200 feet (2,800 m). The summit of Mauna Kea is so high that tourists are advised to stop at the visitor station for at least 30 minutes to acclimate to atmospheric conditions before continuing to the summit, and scientists often stay at Hale Pōhaku for eight hours or more before spending a full night at observatories on the summit, with some telescopes requiring observers to spend one full night at Hale Pōhaku before working at the summit.

== Telescopes ==
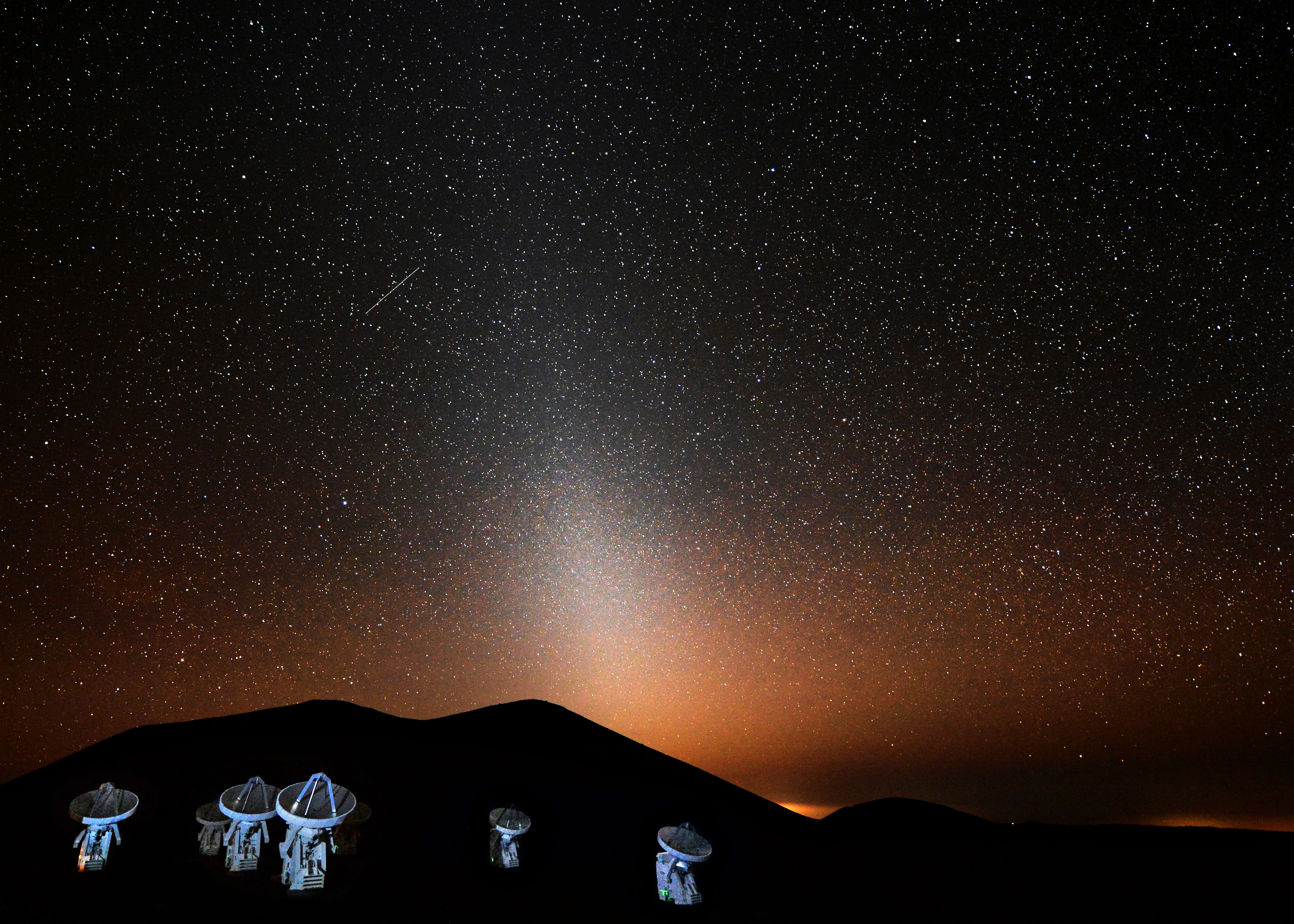
The Submillimeter Array of radio telescopes at night, lit by flash.

From left-to-right: United Kingdom Infrared Telescope, Caltech Sub-Millimeter Observatory (closed 2015), James Clerk Maxwell Telescope, Smithsonian Sub-Millimeter Array, Subaru Telescope, W.M. Keck Observatory (I & II), NASA Infrared Telescope Facility, Canada–France–Hawaii Telescope, Gemini North Telescope

Telescopes around the summits of Mauna Kea are funded by government agencies of various nations. The University of Hawaiʻi directly administers two telescopes. In total, twelve facilities are housing thirteen telescopes around the summits of Mauna Kea.

- Canada–France–Hawaiʻi Telescope (CFHT): Canada, France, University of Hawaiʻi
- Gemini North Telescope: United States, United Kingdom, Canada, Chile, Australia, Argentina, Brazil
- NASA Infrared Telescope Facility (IRTF): NASA
- James Clerk Maxwell Telescope (JCMT): China, Japan, South Korea, Taiwan, United Kingdom, Canada
- Subaru Telescope: National Astronomical Observatory of Japan
- Sub-Millimeter Array (SMA): Taiwan, United States
- University of Hawaiʻi 88-inch (2.2 m) telescope (UH88): University of Hawaiʻi
- One receiver of the Very Long Baseline Array (VLBA): United States
- W. M. Keck Observatory: California Association for Research in Astronomy, Keck Laboratory of Engineering Materials, California Institute of Technology, Pasadena

Proposed:

- Thirty Meter Telescope, proposed for Mauna Kea, alternatively, the Canary Islands

Decommissioning:

- Caltech Submillimeter Observatory (CSO): Caltech — closed 2015 — removed to be moved to Chile as the Leighton Chajnantor Telescope
- United Kingdom Infrared Telescope (UKIRT): Lockheed Martin Advanced Technology Center, University of Hawaiʻi, University of Arizona
- University of Hawaiʻi 36-inch (910 mm) telescope (Hoku Kea): University of Hawaii at Hilo

CSO, UKIRT, and Hoku Kea are scheduled for decommissioning as part of the Mauna Kea Comprehensive Management Plan.

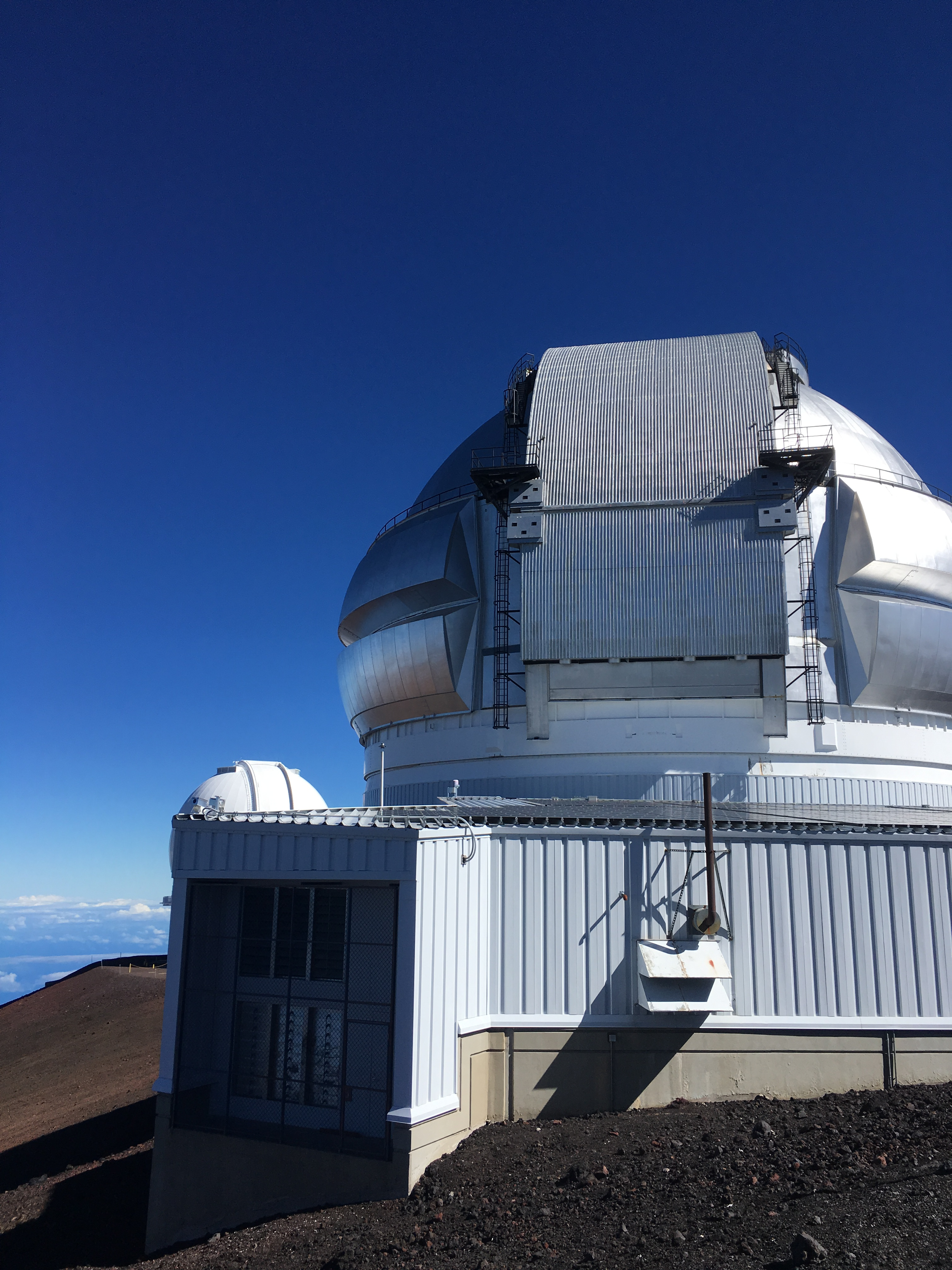

== Opposition and protests ==
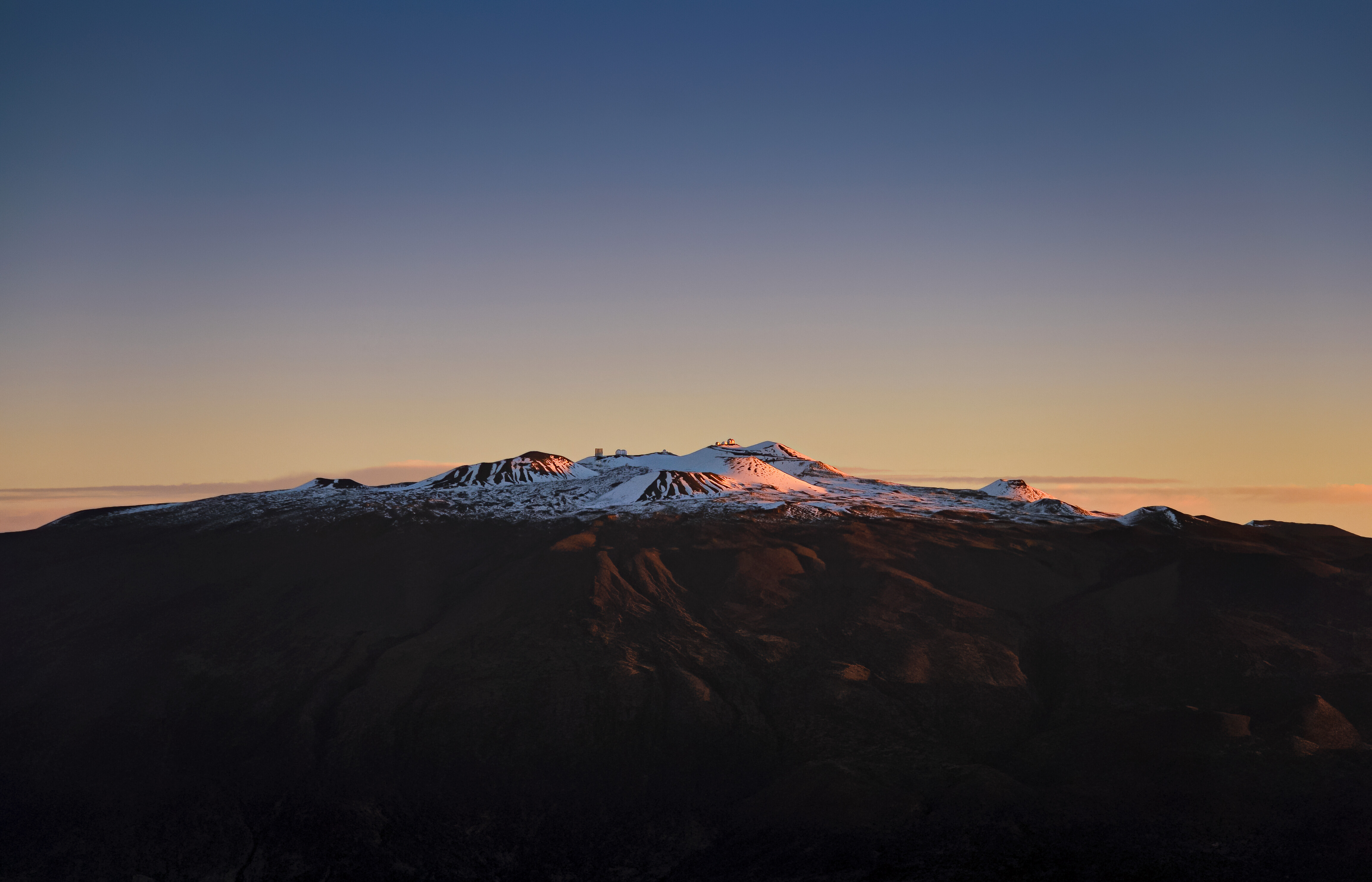
Snowy sunrise on Maunakea

In Honolulu, the governor and legislature, enthusiastic about the development, set aside an even larger area for the observatory after the initial project, causing opposition on the Big Island, in the city of Hilo. Native Hawaiians (kānaka ʻōiwi) believed the entire site was sacred and that developing the mountain, even for science, would spoil the area. Environmentalists were concerned about rare native bird populations, and other citizens of Hilo were concerned about the sight of the domes from the city. Using town hall meetings, Jefferies was able to overcome opposition by weighing the economic advantage and prestige the island would receive. There has been substantial opposition to the Maunakea Observatories that continues to grow. Over the years, the opposition to the observatories may have become the most visible example of the conflict science has encountered over access and use of environmental and culturally significant sites. Opposition to development grew shortly after the expansion of the observatories commenced. Once access was opened up by the roadway to the summit, skiers began using it for recreation and objected when the road was closed as a precaution against vandalism when the telescopes were being built. Hunters voiced concerns, as did the Hawaiian Audubon Society, who were supported by Governor George Ariyoshi.

The Audubon Society objected to further development on Mauna Kea over concerns for habitat of the endangered Palila, a species endemic to only specific parts of this mountain. The bird is the last of the finch-billed honeycreepers existing on the island. Over 50% of native bird species had been killed off due to loss of habitat from early western settlers or the introduction of non-native species competing for resources. Hunters and sportsmen were concerned that the hunting of feral animals would be affected by the telescope operations. A "Save Mauna Kea" movement was inspired by the proliferation of telescopes, with opposition believing the development of the mountain to be sacrilegious. Native Hawaiian non-profit groups, such as Kahea, whose goals are the protection of cultural heritage and the environment, oppose development on Mauna Kea as a sacred space to the Hawaiian religion. The land is protected by the United States Historical Preservation Act due to its significance to Hawaiian culture, but it still allows development.

== 2006 Kiholo Bay earthquake ==
A number of the telescopes sustained minor damage during the October 15, 2006, Kiholo Bay earthquake and aftershocks. JCMT was performing an inclinometry run and recorded the earthquake on its tilt sensors. Both CFHT and W. M. Keck Observatory were operational and back online by October 19.

== Gallery ==
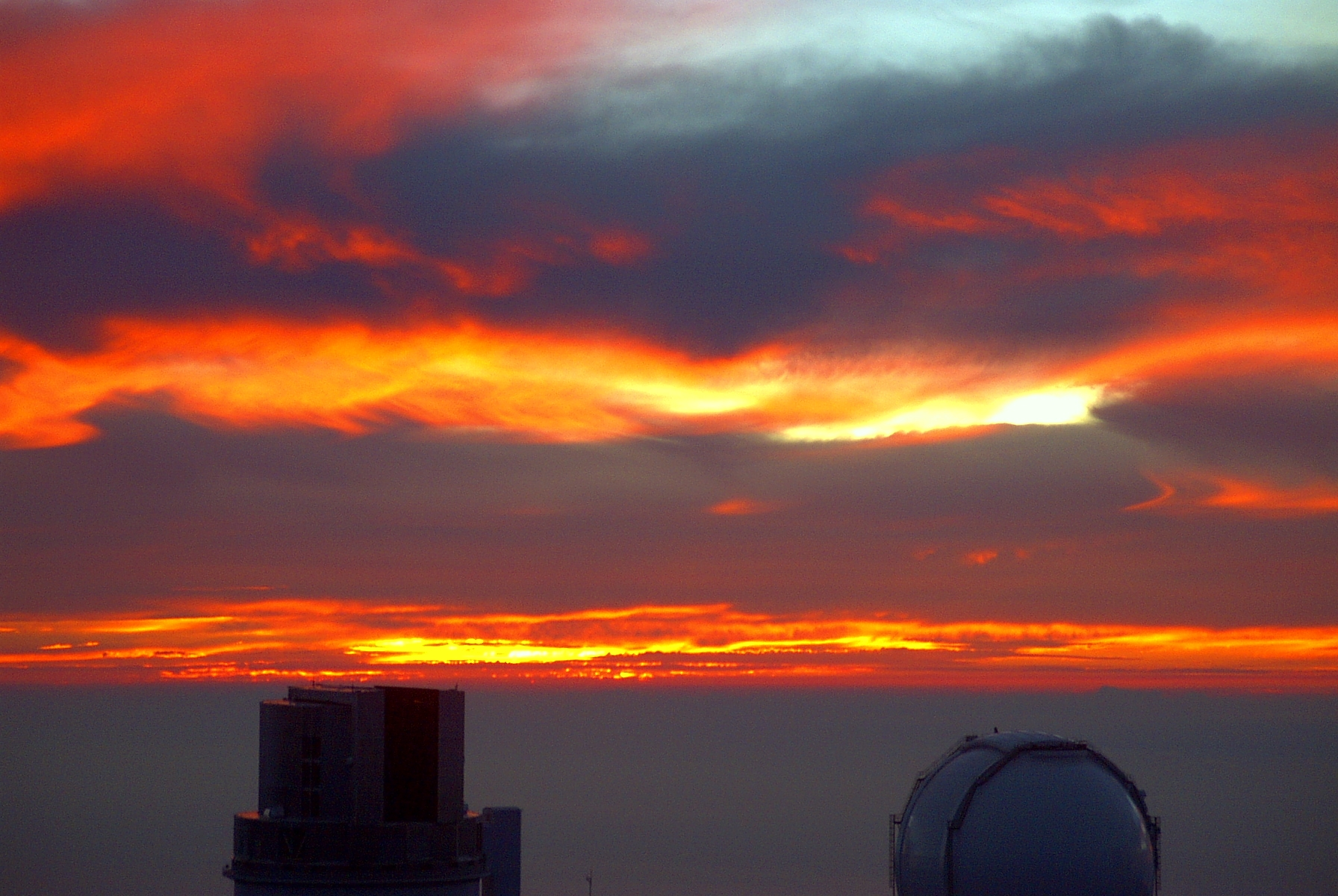
Sunset over Maunakea Observatories

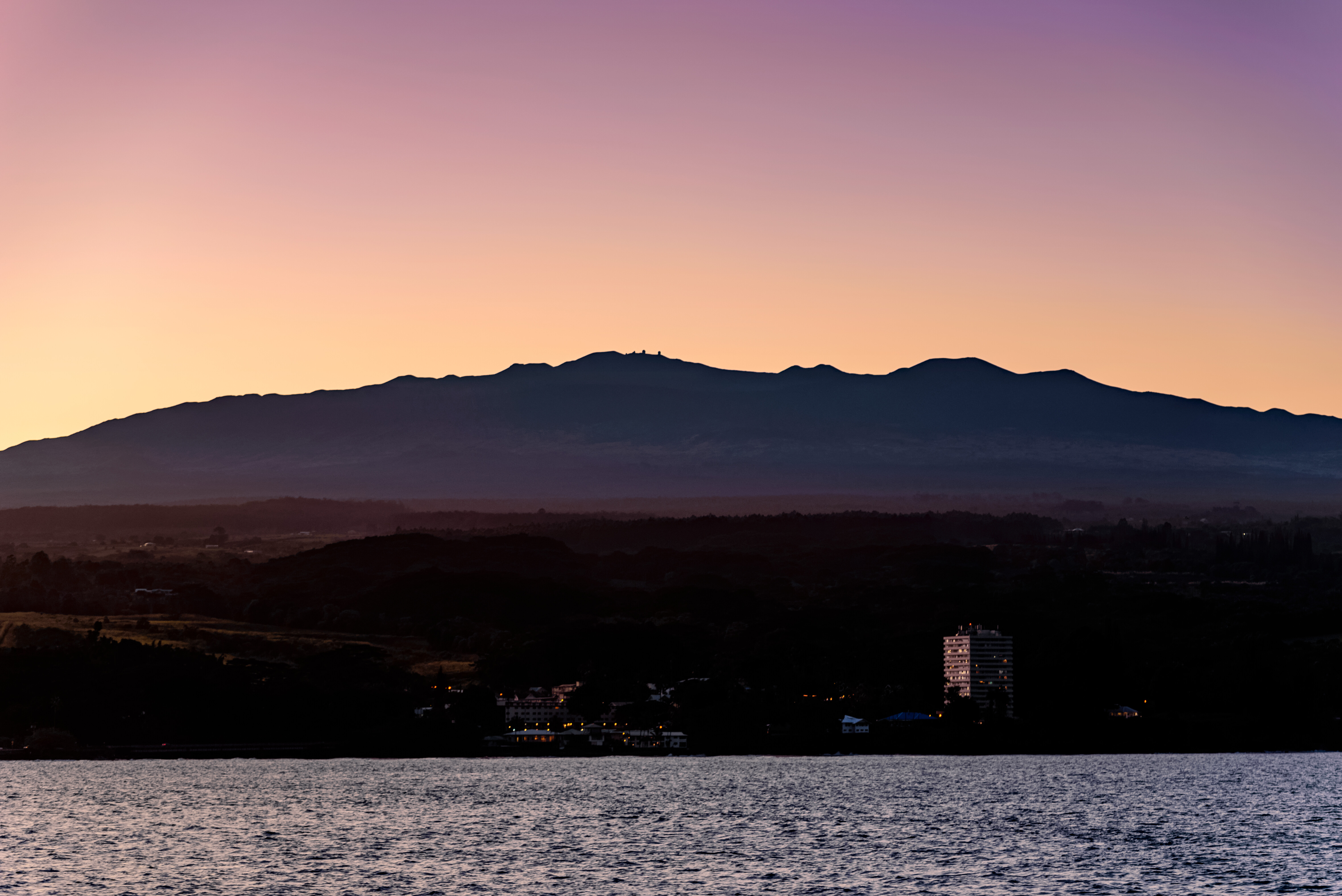
At the Foot of Maunakea

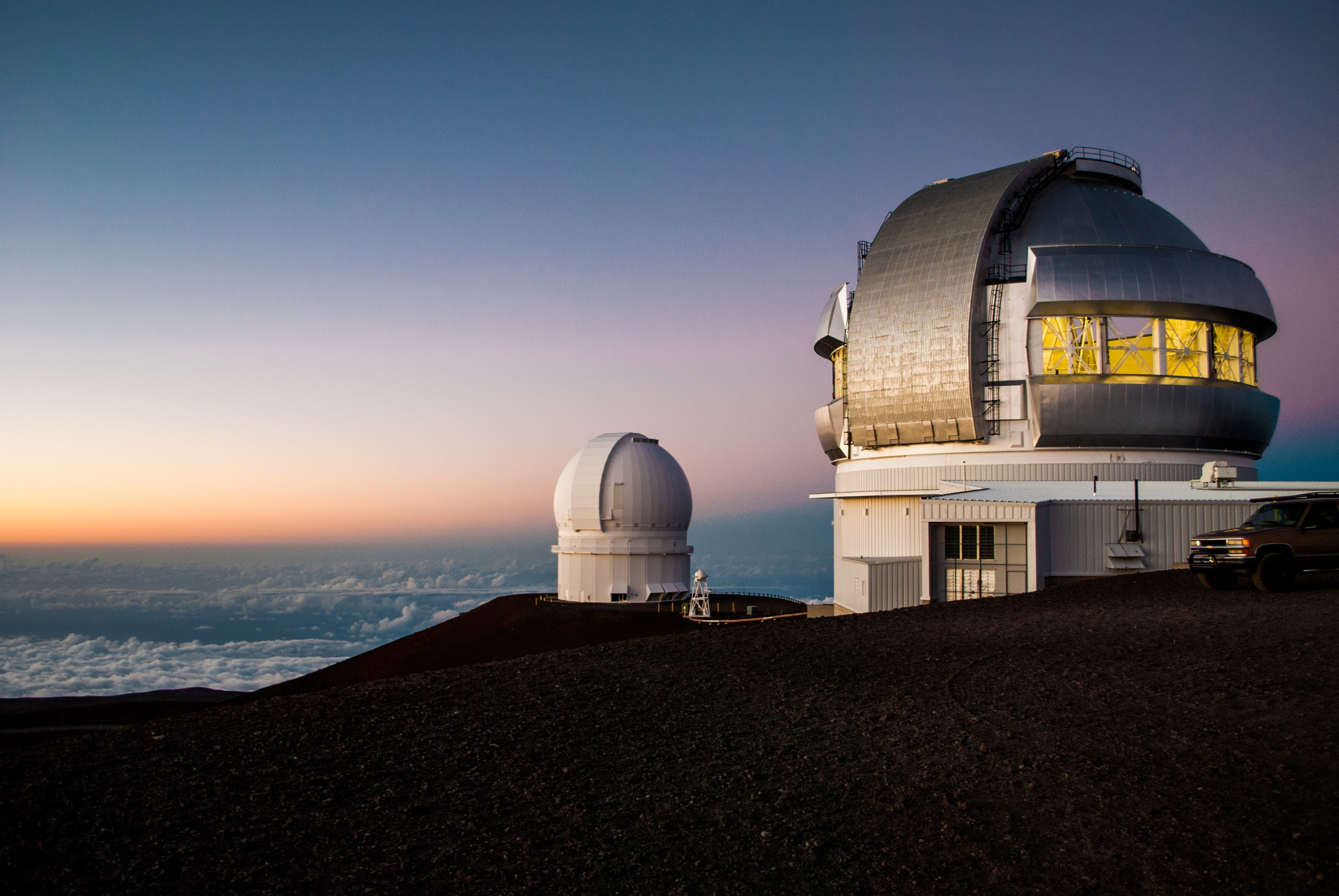
Sunset at Maunakea

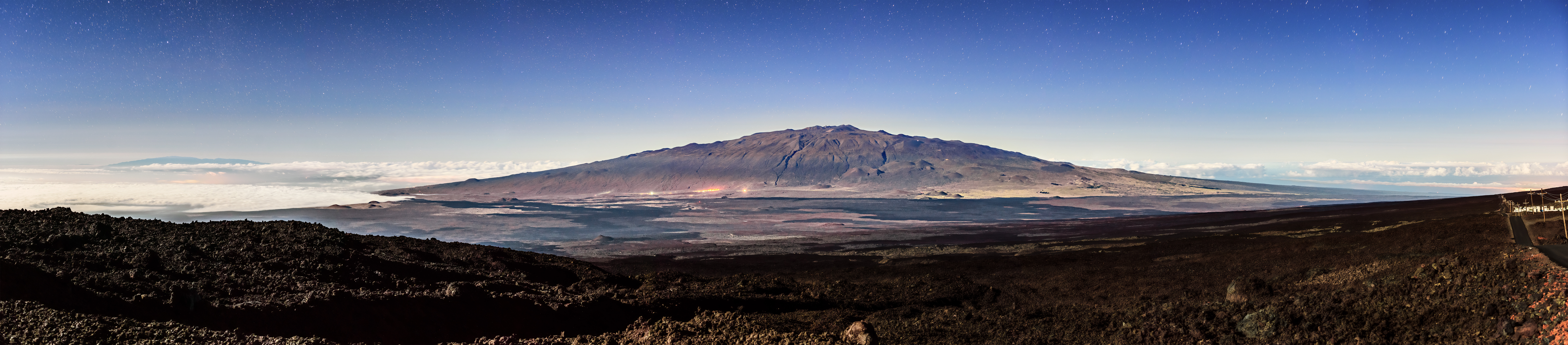
Maunakea is home to several astronomical observatories, including Gemini North, one half of the International Gemini Observatory, operated by NSF’s NOIRLab.

== See also ==
- Lists and comparisons
  - Timeline of telescopes, observatories, and observing technology
  - List of largest optical reflecting telescopes
  - List of largest optical telescopes historically
  - Extremely large telescope
- Other major international observatories (under active development):
  - Roque de los Muchachos Observatory
  - Paranal Observatory
  - Cerro Tololo Inter-American Observatory
  - Llano de Chajnantor Observatory
  - La Silla Observatory
- Historically important observatories (not undergoing substantial development):
  - Mount Wilson Observatory
  - Kitt Peak National Observatory
  - Palomar Observatory
- Projects
  - Ohana project
