= VVV Survey =

Astronomy project

The VVV Survey, (short for "VISTA Variables in the Via Lactea") is an ESO public survey scanning the Milky Way bulge and adjacent section of the southern mid-plane in the near-infrared. This area, is active in star formation and very rich in dust and interstellar gas, which makes it impossible to see through in the visible as the extinction and crowding are high. There are though, some ‘clear windows’ through the whole survey area, where optical surveys can be carried out, like MACHO, OGLE and EROS.

== The VVV Survey ==
With the advanced VISTA 4-metre telescope in Paranal, the VVV Survey has been conducting its 1929 hours of observations over 520 sq. deg. since 2010, systematically making the survey area for multiple epochs. The known catalogue by 2010 was about 10^9 point sources, including 33 known globular clusters and ~350 open clusters.

The VISTA Telescope's main purpose is in tune with "The Visible & Infrared Survey Telescope for Astronomy" goals, which state: "The purpose of the wide field (1.65° diameter in the IR) survey telescope and camera facility is to perform extensive surveys of the southern skies whose sensitivity is matched to the needs of today’s 8-m class telescopes."

The final product of the VVV Survey will be a deep near-IR atlas in five passbands and a catalogue of more than a million variable point sources.

For a complete understanding of the variable sources in the Milky Way, the observations will be combined with data from MACHO, OGLE, EROS, VST, Spitzer, HST, Chandra, INTEGRAL, WISE, Fermi lAT, XMM-Newton, GAIA and ALMA.

As a public survey, the VVV provides data available to the whole community and enables further studies of the history of the Milky Way, its globular cluster evolution and the population census of the Galactic Bulge, as well as the investigation of the star forming regions in the disk. The data releases are done by VSA in Edinburgh.

== Introduction ==
The knowledge about the Galactic bulge by 2010 was about it being triaxial and boxy, and containing a bar (Dweck et al., 1995; López-Corredoira et al., 2005; Benjamin et al., 2005) — a scenario believed to be the dominant channel of formation of bulges in late-type spirals (Sbc). However, the Milky Way is problematic to understand under this context, because while its surface brightness shows a barred structure, its stellar population is predominantly old. (Kuijken & Rich, 2002; Zoccali et al., 2003) and has an α-element enhancement, characteristic of rapid formation. Nevertheless, the high mean age of the Bulge still leaves space for a small fraction of young stellar objects (YSO) which have been found in the inner Bulge (e.g., Schuller et al., 2006; Yusef-Zadeh et al., 2009). This is in agreement with the results of Zoccali et al. (2006) which indicate that the chemical composition of the bulge stars is different from that of both thin and thick-disk stars. Thus, the predictions from the formation of the Milky Way bulge through secular evolution of the disk seem to be in conflict with some key properties of its stellar population. However, Meléndez et al. (2008) recently published results that are in contradiction to Zoccali et al. (2006) and show that bulge and disk stars are indistinguishable in their chemical composition. Given that the near-IR colours depend strongly on metallicity, the VVV survey will help to investigate the metallicity distribution in the survey region. Spectroscopic data (e.g., future APOGEE; Majewski et al., 2007) will provide additional α-element abundances.

Among the variable stars are RR Lyraes and Cepheids, which are well-understood distance indicators that will provide the 3rd dimension on the 3-D map of the surveyed region that will yield important information on the ages of the populations. A comparison between the RR Lyrae and type II Cepheids in the field and in globular clusters may hold precious information about the formation of the bulge (e.g. Feast et al., 2008). Modern ΛCDM cosmology predicts that large galaxies such as the Milky Way formed by accretion of hundreds of smaller “protogalactic fragments”, perhaps not unlike the progenitors of the present-day dwarf spheroidal satellites (e.g., Abadi et al., 2003).

Two very massive globular clusters in the Galactic bulge, NGC 6388 and NGC 6441, have recently been suggested to be the remnants of dwarf galaxies that were accreted in the course of the Galaxy's history (Ree et al., 2002). These clusters might prove similar to the cases of M54 (NGC 6715), in the center of the Sgr dSph, which is currently being cannibalised by the Milky Way (Ibata et al., 1995), and of ω Cen (NGC 5139), which has long been suspected to be the remnant nucleus of a dwarf galaxy (e.g., Altmann et al., 2005, and references therein). The proposed search for RR Lyrae and type II Cepheids in the Galactic bulge will reveal the presence of debris related to the accretion events that might have left behind NGC 6441 as a remnant object. The latter is part of the survey.

The survey is over the galactic plane in the region −65° < l < −10° and |b | < 2° where star-formation activity is high and for which there are complementary optical, mid-IR and far-IR data from VPHAS+, the Spitzer and MIPSGAL surveys, and from the all-sky AKARI and WISE surveys. The addition of this region will also enable discrimination between various models of the inner Galactic structure which, besides the triaxial bulge, contain a long bar and a ring (e.g., López-Corredoira et al., 2007), or not (e.g., Merrifield, 2004, and references therein). Indeed, the selected region includes the putative negative-longitude tip of the long bar (at l ≈ −14°, |b| < 1°), which has not yet been observed. Other important parameters, such as velocity dispersion and metallicity, will be determined by spectroscopic follow-up observations. In addition, the luminosity function of the clusters themselves will be measured, for both star-forming clusters and more evolved open clusters. These issues cannot be addressed with optical surveys, owing to the high extinction in the plane. The Spitzer data will be invaluable for detecting the most obscured high-mass protostars within star-forming regions. A near-IR survey will be more sensitive to all but the reddest objects, and the superior spatial resolution in these wavebands will be essential for resolving distant clusters and the crowded field populations.

== Survey Area ==
The VVV Survey area consists of 348 tiles, 196 tiles in the bulge and 152 in the disk area. These two components were planned to cover 520 sq. deg, as follows: (i) the VVV bulge survey area covers 300 sq. deg between −10° ≤ l ≤+10° and −10° ≤ b ≤+5°; and (ii) the VVV disk survey area covers 220 sq. deg between 295° ≤ l ≤ 350° and −2° ≤ b ≤ +2° However, in order to maximize the efficiency of the tiling process, the Survey Area Definition Tool (SADT; Hilker et al. 2011) produced some shifts at the edges of the survey area, and as the result an area of ~562 sq. deg (42 sq. deg larger) was observed. Thus, the observed area is within −10.0 ≤ l ≤ +10.4 and within −10.3° ≤ b ≤ +5.1° in the bulge, and 294.7° ≤ l ≤ 350.0° and −2.25° ≤ b ≤ +2.25° in the disk.

== History ==
On January 15, 2006, ESO made the call for proposals of Public Surveys for VISTA. Fourteen proposals were submitted, and in November 2006, the VVV Survey was approved with VISTA.

The second cycle call for proposals of Public Surveys for VISTA, 2016 to 2020, opened on August 1, 2015 and the VVV eXtended Survey was accepted.
