= NGC 73 =

Spiral galaxy in the constellation Cetus

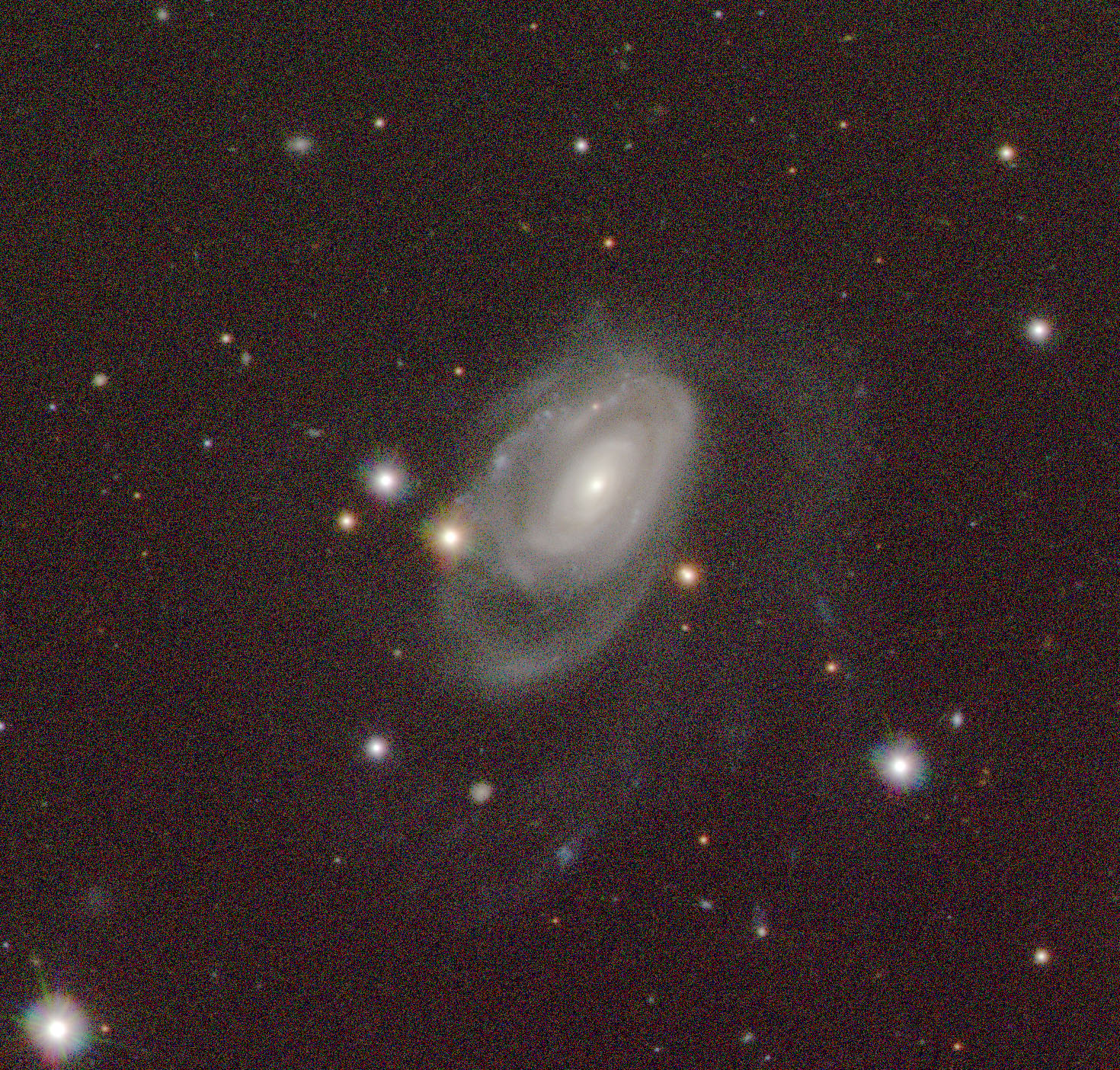
- ESO's VST image of NGC 73

Observation data (J2000 epoch)
- Constellation: Cetus
- Right ascension: 00^{h} 18^{m} 38.98029^{s}
- Declination: −15° 19′ 20.6128″
- Redshift: 0.025785
- Heliocentric radial velocity: 7631 km/s
- Distance: 289.4 Mly (88.72 Mpc)
- Apparent magnitude (B): 13

Characteristics
- Type: SAB(rs)bc:

Other designations
- MCG -03-01-026, PGC 1211

NGC 73 is an intermediate spiral galaxy estimated to be about 350 million light-years away in the constellation of Cetus. It was discovered by Lewis A. Swift from the USA in 1886 and its apparent magnitude is 13.7.

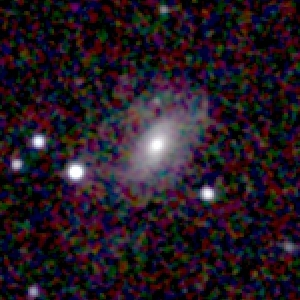
Image from 2MASS
