= NGC 283 =

Galaxy located in the constellation Cetus

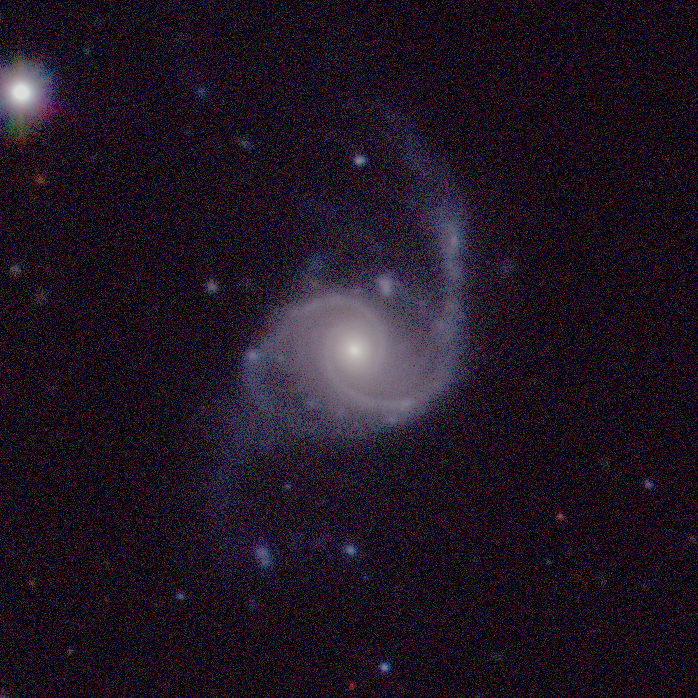
- ESO VST image of NGC 283

Observation data (J2000 epoch)
- Constellation: Cetus
- Right ascension: 00^{h} 53^{m} 13.2^{s}
- Declination: −13° 09′ 50″
- Redshift: 0.037823
- Heliocentric radial velocity: 11,339 km/s
- Apparent magnitude (V): 14.81

Characteristics
- Type: Sc
- Apparent size (V): 1.6' × 1.0'

Other designations
- MCG -02-03-031, 2MASX J00531321-1309502, IRAS 00507-1326, F00507-1325, PGC 3124.

NGC 283 is a spiral galaxy in the constellation Cetus. It was discovered on October 2, 1886, by Francis Leavenworth.
