= Manuela Zoccali =

Italian astronomer

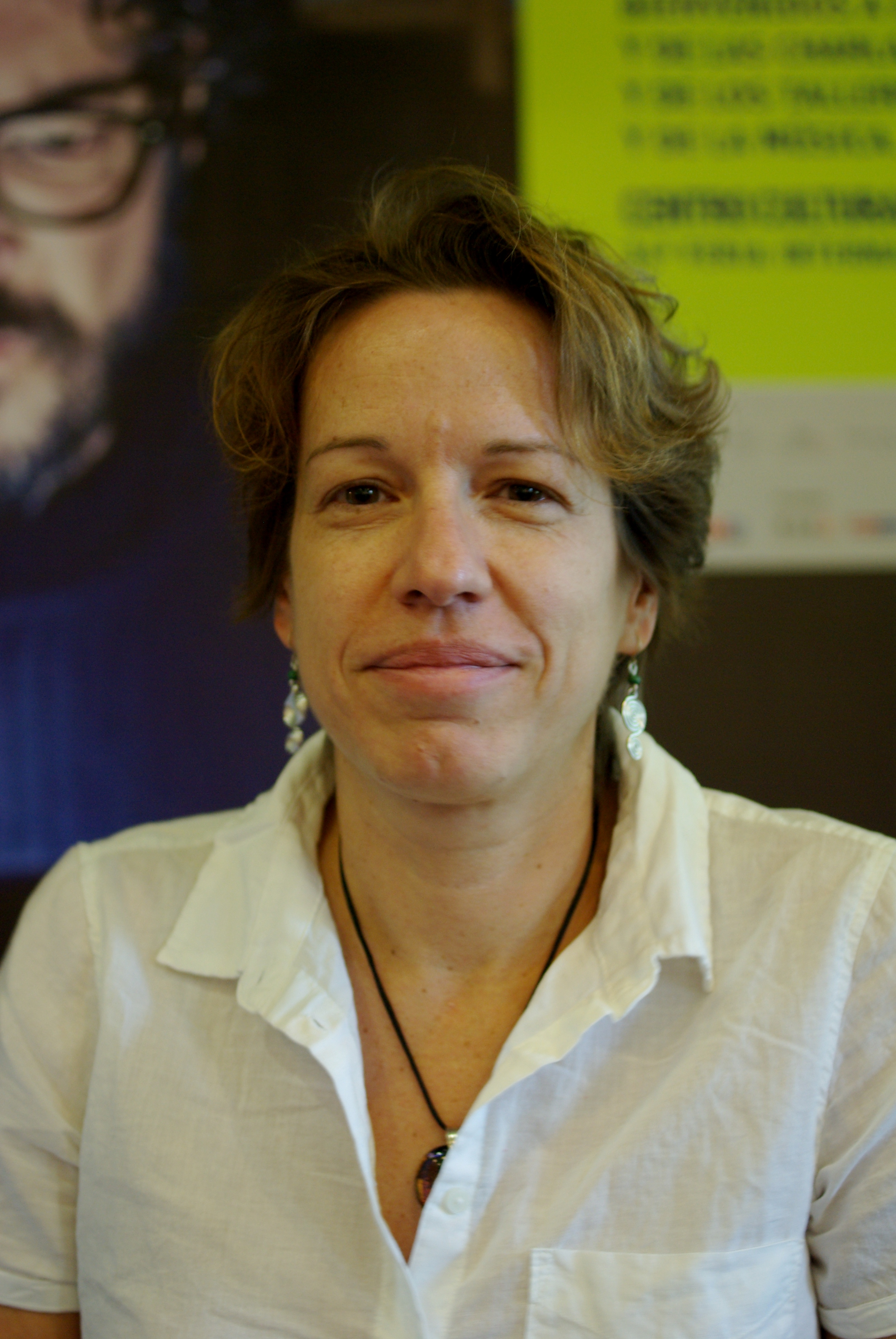
- Manuela Zoccali in 2016
- Education: University of Padua (PhD)
- Employer: Pontifical Catholic University of Chile
- Awards: Guggenheim Fellowship (2011)
- Website: www.astro.puc.cl/~mzoccali/

Manuela Zoccali is an Italian astronomer who works in Chile as a professor of astrophysics at the Pontifical Catholic University of Chile in Santiago, and is the former director of the Millennium Institute of Astrophysics at the university. Her research concerns the metallicity of stars, particularly those in the galactic bulge of the Milky Way, and the implications of these observations for the evolution of both individual stars and the formation of the bulge. Her research has suggested the independent formation of stars in the bulge, rather than migration of stars from the galactic disk to its bulge.

== Education and career ==
Zoccali is originally from Reggio Calabria in southern Italy. She was a student of astronomy at the University of Padua, where she earned a laurea in 1995, with undergraduate research on globular cluster NGC 1261, and completed her Ph.D. in 2000. Her doctoral dissertation concerned low-mass stars, and was supervised by Giampaolo Piotto.

She became a postdoctoral researcher at the European Southern Observatory from 2000 to 2003, during which she first visited Chile to help set up spectroscopy instrumentation at the Paranal Observatory. Next, she won a joint fellowship of Princeton University and the Pontifical Catholic University of Chile, funding her for a continued year of postdoctoral research through both universities. After starting a family in Chile, in 2004 she joined the Pontifical Catholic University of Chile as an assistant professor. She was promoted to associate professor in 2008 and full professor in 2016.

She was the director of the Millennium Institute of Astrophysics from 2016 to 2019, and continues as deputy director.

== Recognition ==
Zoccali was awarded a Guggenheim Fellowship in 2011.
