= VISTA (telescope) =

Telescope at the Paranal Observatory in Chile

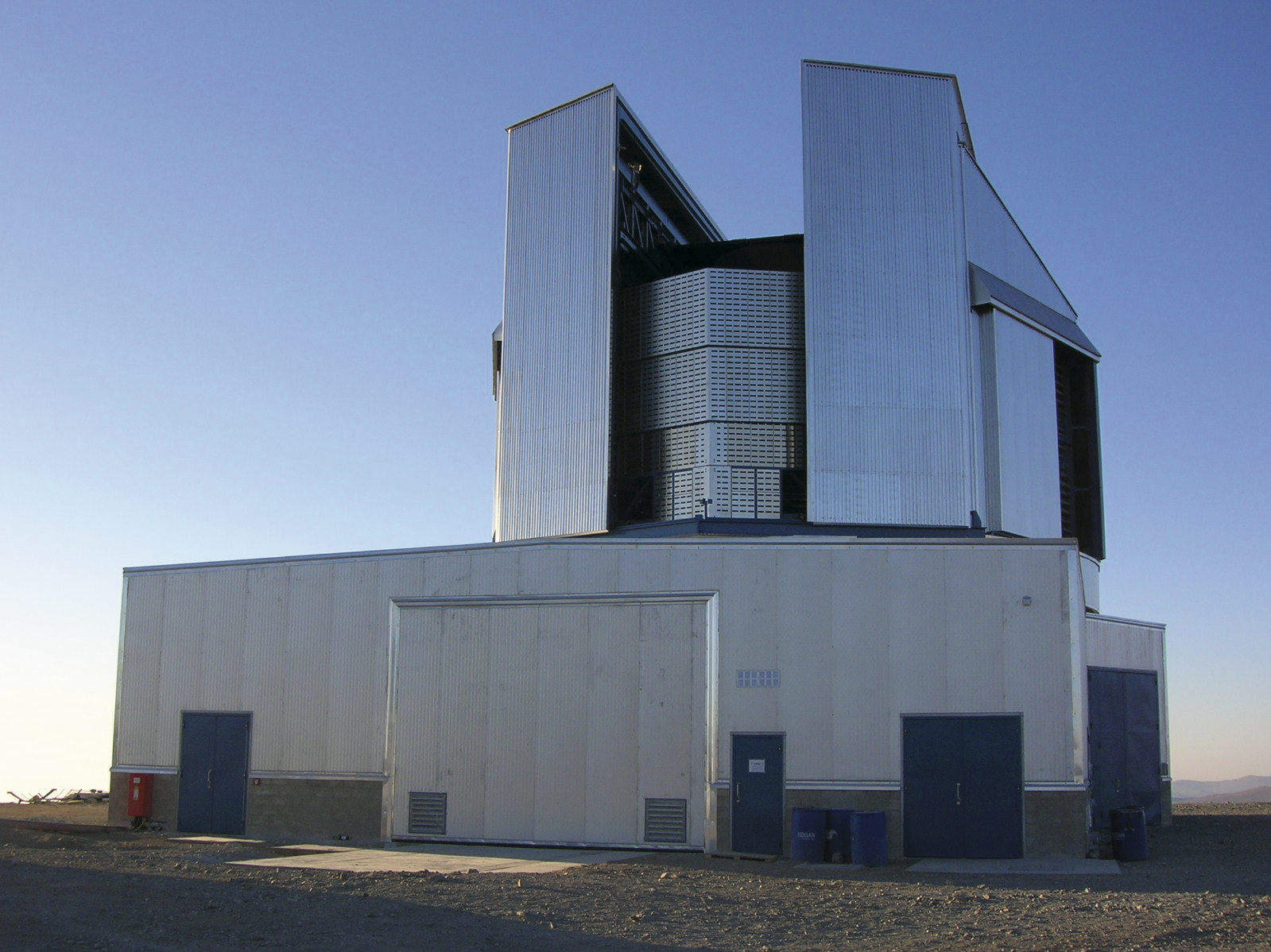
- VISTA (Credit: ESO)
- Alternative names: Visible and Infrared Survey Telescope for Astronomy
- Location: Cerro Paranal, Antofagasta Province, Antofagasta Region, Chile
- Coordinates: 24°36′57″S 70°23′51″W
- Altitude: 2,518 m (8,261 ft)
- Wavelength: 0.85 μm (350 THz)–2.3 μm (130 THz)
- Diameter: 4.1 m (13 ft 5 in)
- Secondary diameter: 1.24 m (4 ft 1 in)
- Focal length: 12.1 m (39 ft 8 in)
- Website: www.eso.org/public/teles-instr/paranal-observatory/surveytelescopes/vista/
- Location within Chile
- Related media on Commons

The VISTA (Visible and Infrared Survey Telescope for Astronomy) is a wide-field reflecting telescope with a 4.1 metre mirror, located at the Paranal Observatory in Chile. It is operated by the European Southern Observatory and started science operations in December 2009. VISTA was conceived and developed by a consortium of universities in the United Kingdom led by Queen Mary University of London and became an in-kind contribution to ESO as part of the UK's accession agreement, with the subscription paid by the UK Science and Technology Facilities Council (STFC).

VISTA is a survey telescope working originally at infrared wavelengths, and was the largest telescope in the world dedicated to surveying the sky at near-infrared wavelengths. From 2009 - 2023 the telescope had only one instrument: VIRCAM, the Vista InfraRed CAMera. This is a 3-tonne camera containing 16 special detectors sensitive to infrared light, with a combined total of 67 million pixels.

A second-generation instrument called 4MOST, a 2400-object fibre-fed multi-object spectrograph, was installed in 2024-25 and started operations at the telescope in 2026.

Observing at wavelengths longer than those visible to the human eye allowed VISTA to study objects that may be almost impossible to see in visible light because they are cool, obscured by dust clouds or because their light has been stretched towards redder wavelengths by the expansion of space during the light's long journey from the early Universe.

== 4MOST ==
The new 4MOST multi-object spectrograph saw first light on VISTA in October 2025, starting science operations in 2026, planning for 5+ years of operation. Key components of 4MOST are a new 4-lens wide-field corrector giving a hexagonal science field of 2.5 degrees diameter; a fibre-positioner with 2436 individually movable fibre-optic spines, and three spectrographs mounted on the telescope base: 1624 fibres are routed to two medium-resolution spectrographs covering the full visible wavelength range 370-950 nm, while 812 fibres go to one high-resolution spectrograph covering three smaller wavelength windows of blue, green and red light. Additional hardware includes 4 metrology cameras, new active-optics cameras and calibration sources. Medium and high-resolution observations are simultaneous; typical exposures are 20-30 minutes length, with repeated visits for fainter objects.

4MOST will cover the entire Southern hemisphere sky with several visits to each location over the first 5 years, while fibres are shared out between many distinct science projects in each pointing. Projects include followup of targets from space missions including GAIA, eROSITA and PLATO, plus supernova discoveries from Rubin Observatory and others.

== Project history ==
VISTA carried out surveys of the southern sky at near infrared wavelengths. Such surveys should both return direct scientific results and help select objects for further studies with larger telescopes. There are two related projects: the Wide Field Camera (WFCAM) on the United Kingdom Infrared Telescope in Hawaii carries out infrared surveys of the northern sky, and the VLT Survey Telescope in Chile carries out surveys of the southern sky in visible light.

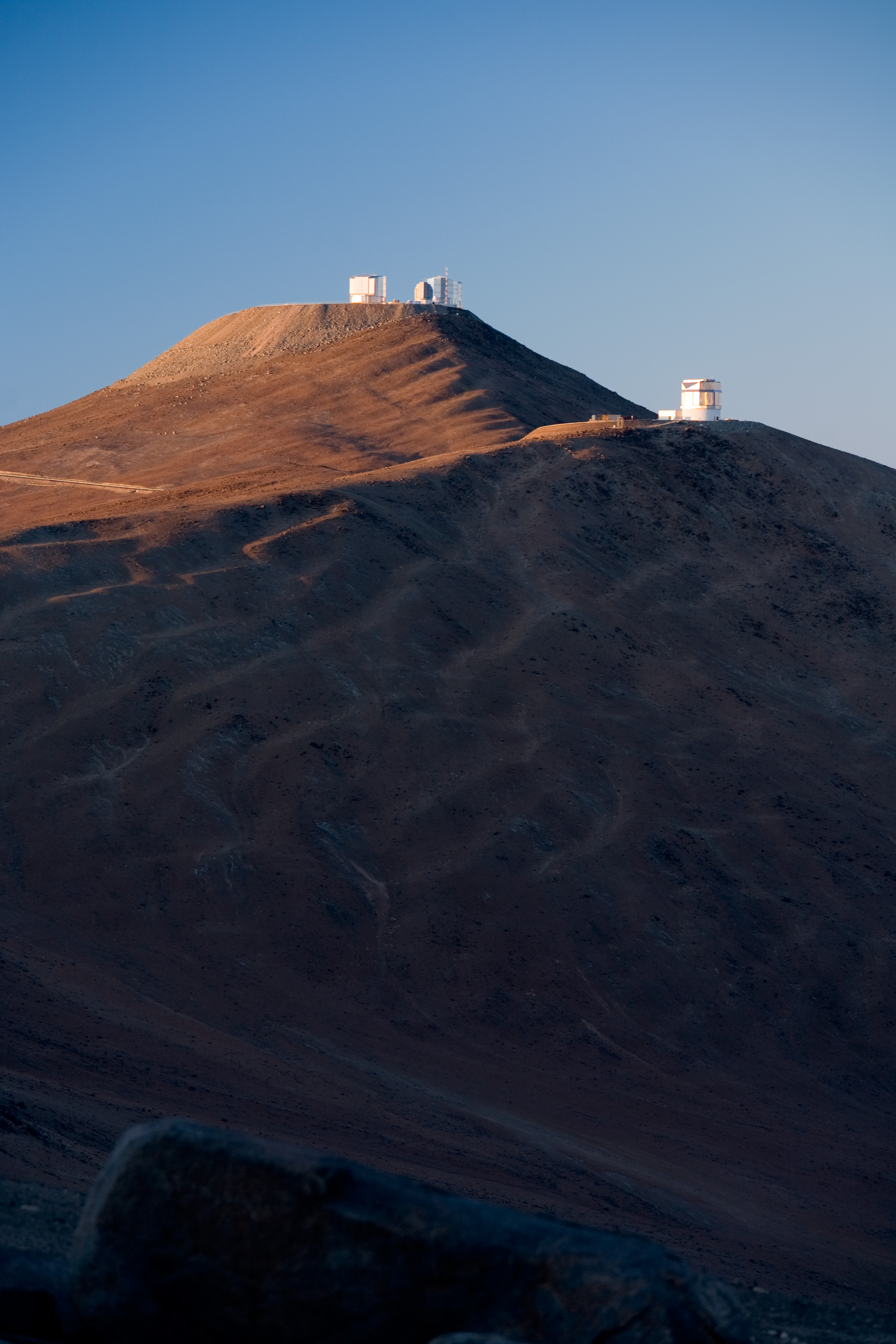
Early morning shot shows VISTA in front of the Paranal summit.

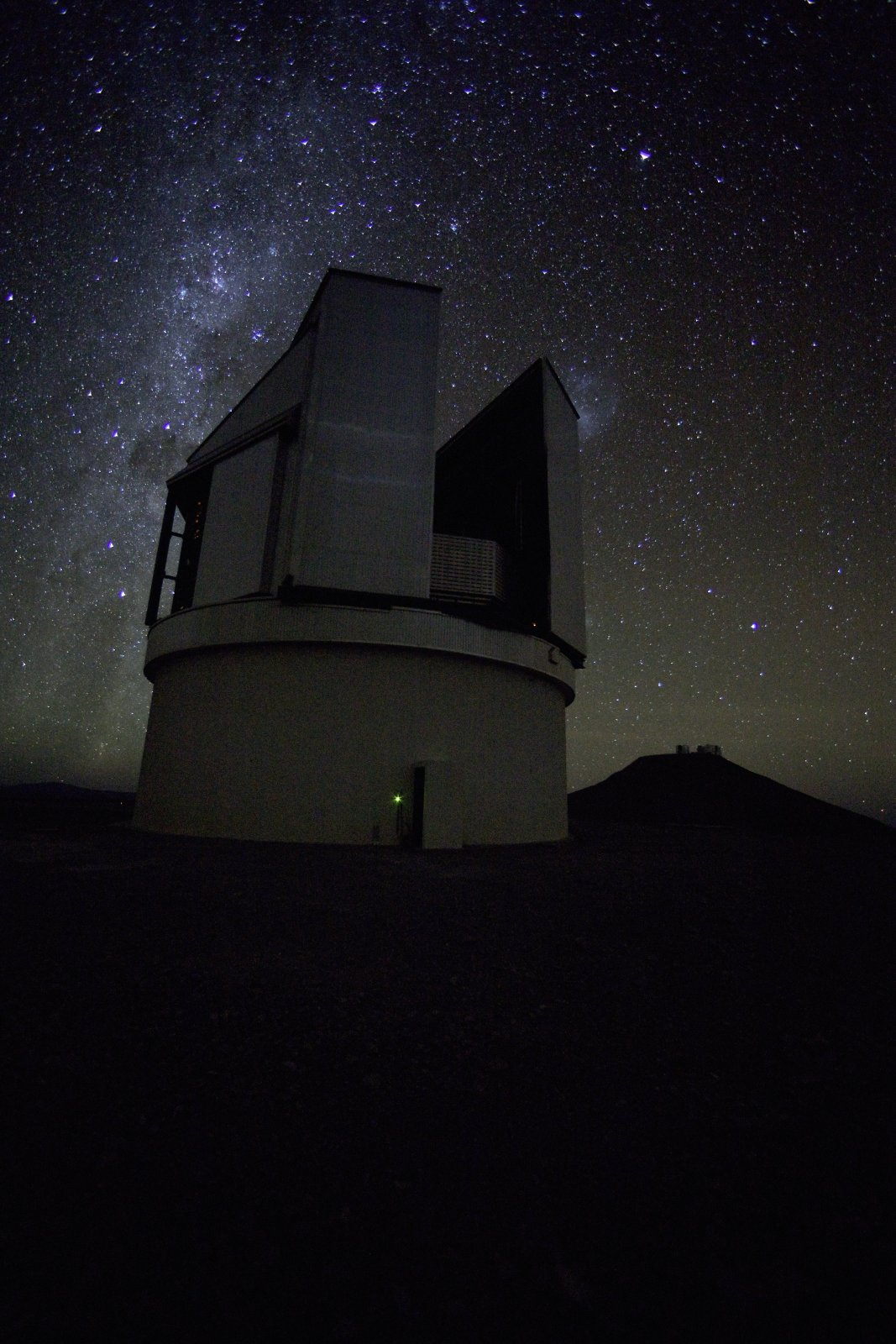
VISTA at night (Credit: ESO).

VISTA exposes high-speed antics of young stars in the Orion Nebula

One of the first images released made by the VISTA telescope depicting the Flame Nebula and the neighbouring Horsehead Nebula

The Fornax Galaxy Cluster as seen by VISTA

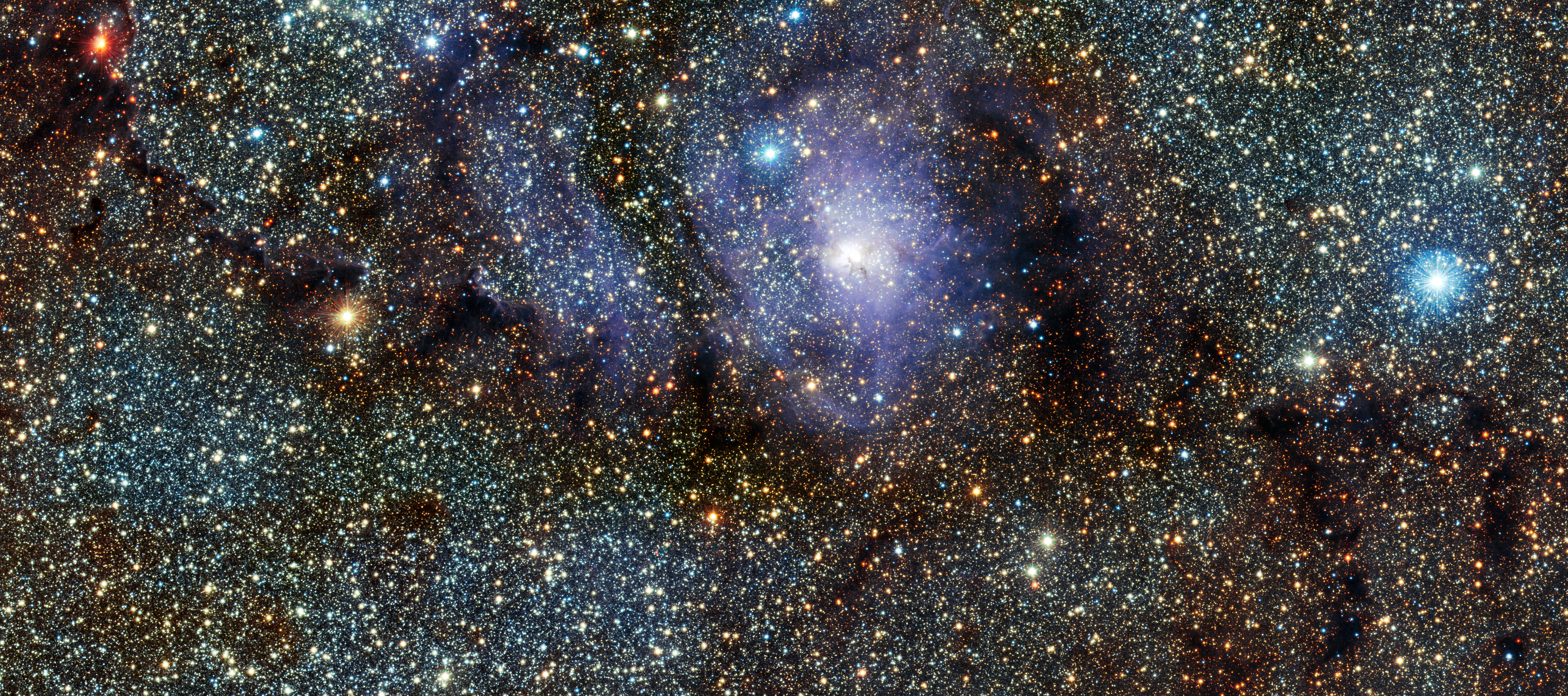
VISTA stares into the Blue Lagoon

The project was initiated in 1999 by the VISTA Consortium of 18 universities in the United Kingdom (UK), which obtained funding from a joint infrastructure fund of the UK government and further funding from the Particle Physics and Astronomy Research Council. The project is valued at €46M (£36M).

After considering several sites in Chile, the consortium chose the Paranal Observatory of the European Southern Observatory (ESO), namely a secondary peak 1,500 m from the Very Large Telescope (VLT). The consortium selected the UK Astronomy Technology Centre to take technical responsibility for design and construction of the telescope. Two years later – in 2002 – the UK joined ESO, and VISTA became an in-kind component of the joining fee. The consortium then completed the construction and commissioning of the telescope, and the Science and Technology Facilities Council – on behalf of the UK – handed over the telescope to ESO, for the benefit of astronomers in all its member countries.

== VISTA Surveys ==
Scientific goals of the VISTA surveys that started in 2010, include multiple scientific problems in astrophysics today. This does range from the nature of dark energy, to the threat of near-Earth asteroids.

From 2010-2017 six large public surveys were conducted by VISTA: UltraVISTA, VISTA Kilo-Degree Infrared Galaxy Survey (VIKING), VISTA Magellanic Survey (VMC), VISTA Variables in the Via Lactea (VVV), VISTA Hemisphere Survey (VHS), VISTA Deep Extragalactic Observations Survey (VIDEO). These will take up the majority of the observing time in the telescope's first five years of operations. The surveys cover different areas of sky to different depths to attack a wide range of scientific questions. More information about each of the VISTA surveys can be found on the ESO — VISTA Surveys website and in the ESO — Public Surveys Projects webpage.

From 2016-2022 a further six public infrared surveys were conducted: UltraVISTA extension, VVVX (extension of VVV), VEILS (VISTA Extragalactic Infrared Legacy Survey, extension of VIDEO); SHARKS (Southern H-ATLAS Regions K-band Survey), VINROUGE (gravitational wave event followup) and GCAV (Galaxy Clusters at VIRCAM). All datasets are available via the ESO archive.

== Science with VISTA ==
VISTA is a large telescope with a large field of view, it can detect faint sources and quickly cover wide areas of sky. Each VISTA image captures a section of sky covering about ten times the area of the full Moon. The telescope will be able to detect and catalogue objects over the whole southern sky with a sensitivity that is forty times greater compared to earlier infrared sky surveys such as the Two Micron All-Sky Survey. This jump in observational power, is comparable to the step in sensitivity from the unaided eye to Galileo's first telescope. It will reveal vast numbers of new objects and allow the creation of far more complete inventories of rare and exotic objects in the southern sky.

VISTA observations will support research in many astronomical areas. Within our galaxy, VISTA is expected to find many new brown dwarf stars and be able to test ideas about the nature of dark matter. One VISTA survey is designed to find and study huge numbers of variable stars in our galaxy by taking images of the same areas of sky at different times. Using VISTA data astronomers will be able to map the structure of our galaxy in much more detail than ever before. Another VISTA survey will study our neighbouring small galaxies, the Magellanic Clouds, and their surroundings. VISTA data will also be used to create a 3D map of about 5% of the entire observable Universe. Further out, VISTA will be a powerful tool for discovering remote quasars and studying the evolution of galaxies and clusters of galaxies. It will help to probe the nature of dark energy by finding very distant galaxy clusters. Infrared measurements from the VVV astronomical survey have been employed to bolster the cosmic distance ladder, namely by providing reliable distances to star clusters and Cepheid variable stars.

== Selection of VISTA Images ==
The first released image (left) shows the Flame Nebula (NGC 2024), a spectacular star-forming cloud of gas and dust in the familiar constellation of Orion (the Hunter) and its surroundings. In visible light the core of the object is hidden behind thick clouds of dust, but the VISTA image, taken at infrared wavelengths, can penetrate the murk and reveal the cluster of hot young stars hidden within. The wide field of view of the VISTA camera also captures the glow of NGC 2023 and the ghostly form of the famous Horsehead Nebula.

Other stunning nebula images include the VISTA views of the Orion Nebula and the Lagoon Nebula. The picture on the right is a wide-field view of the Orion Nebula (Messier 42), lying about 1350 light-years from Earth, taken with the VISTA infrared survey telescope at ESO's Paranal Observatory in Chile. The telescope's huge field of view allows the whole nebula and its surroundings to be imaged in a single picture and its infrared vision also means that it can peer deep into the normally hidden dusty regions and reveal the curious antics of the very active young stars buried there. An image of the "Blue Lagoon" is seen on the left (below the Flame Nebula picture) — it is an infrared image taken as part of the VVV survey. It shows the stellar nursery called the Lagoon Nebula (also known as Messier 8), which lies about 4000–5000 light-years away in the constellation of Sagittarius (the Archer).

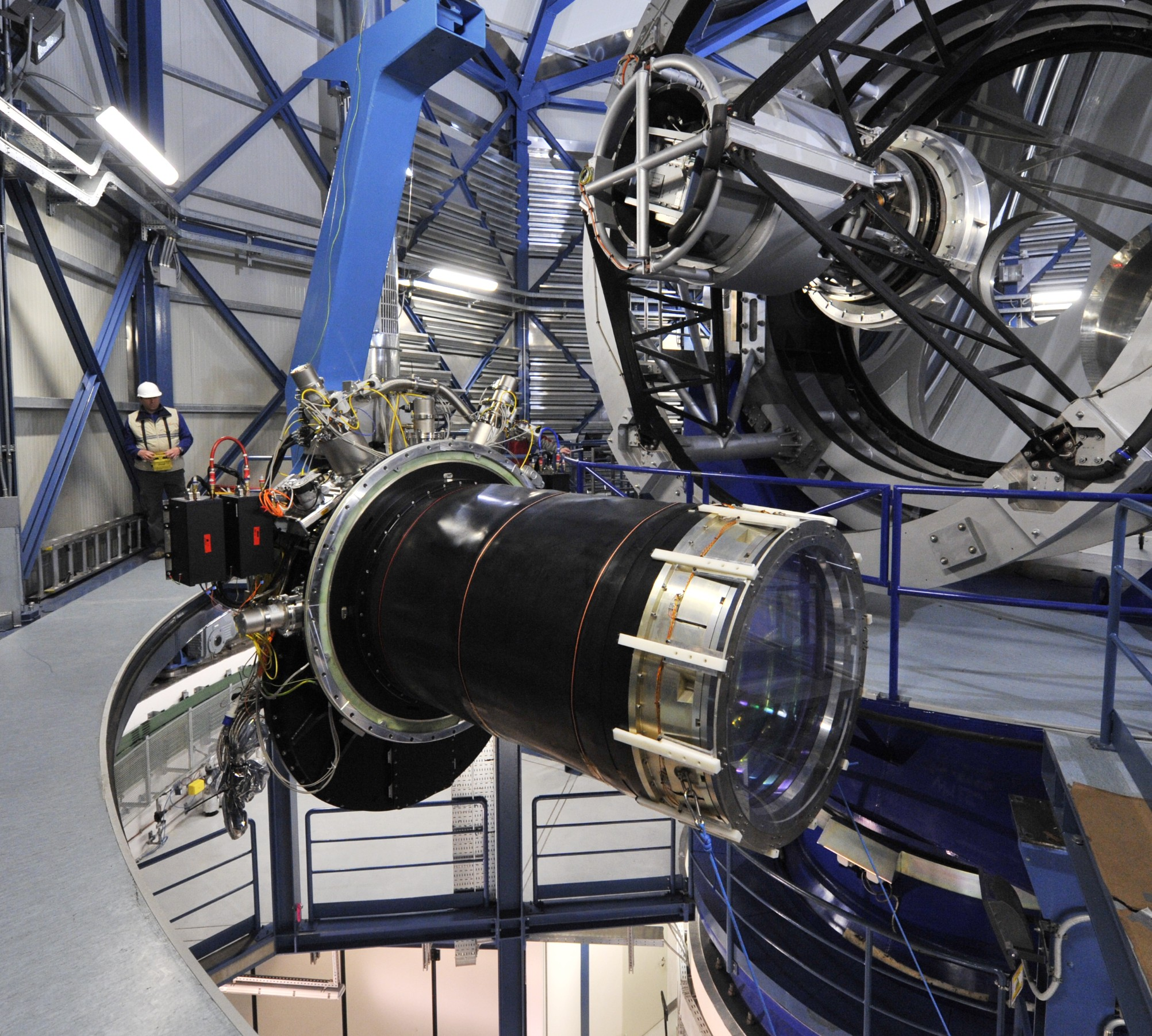
The three-tonne VISTA infrared camera hangs in the air in front of the telescope.

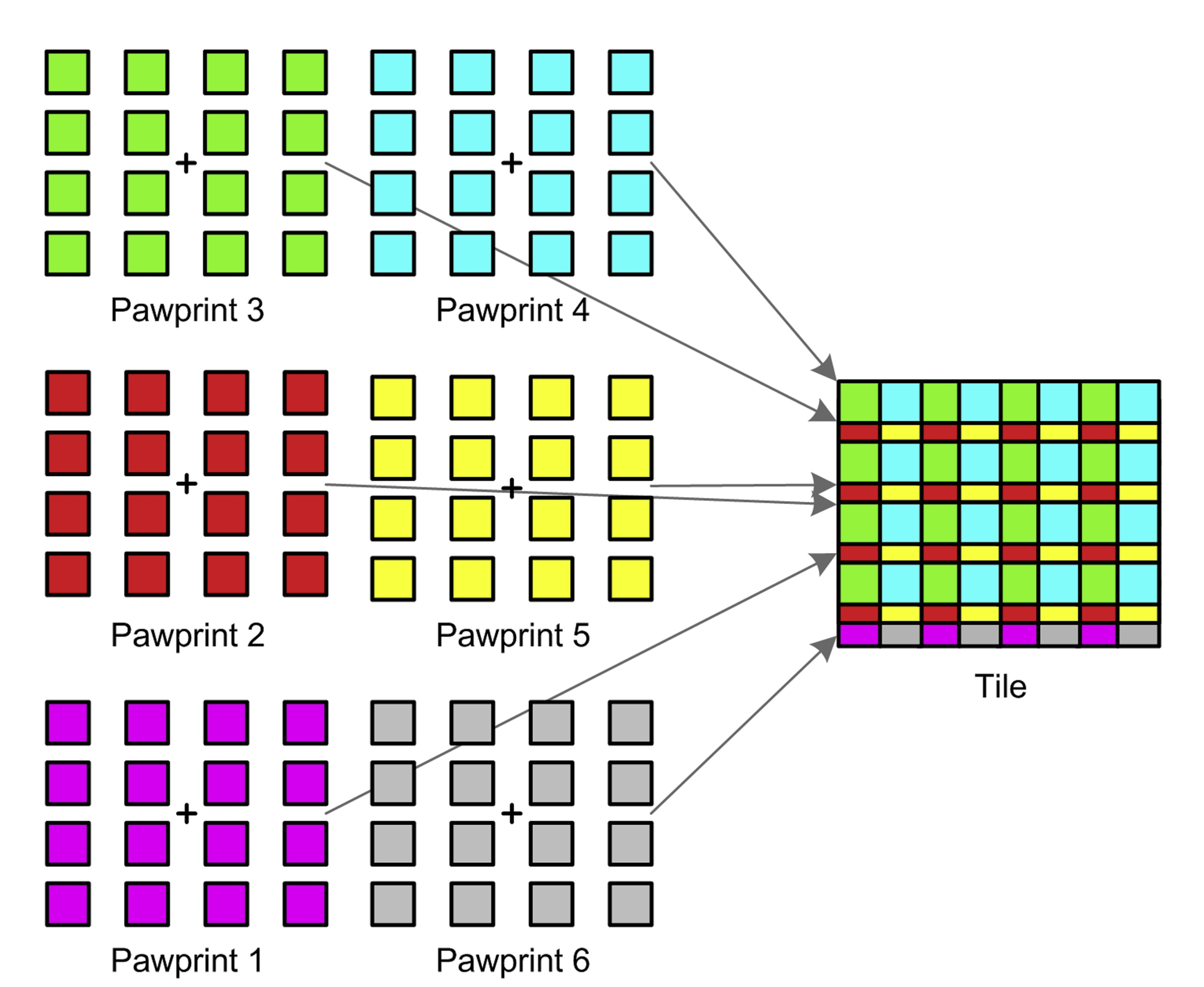
This picture shows how six different "paw print" exposures are combined to make one "tile".

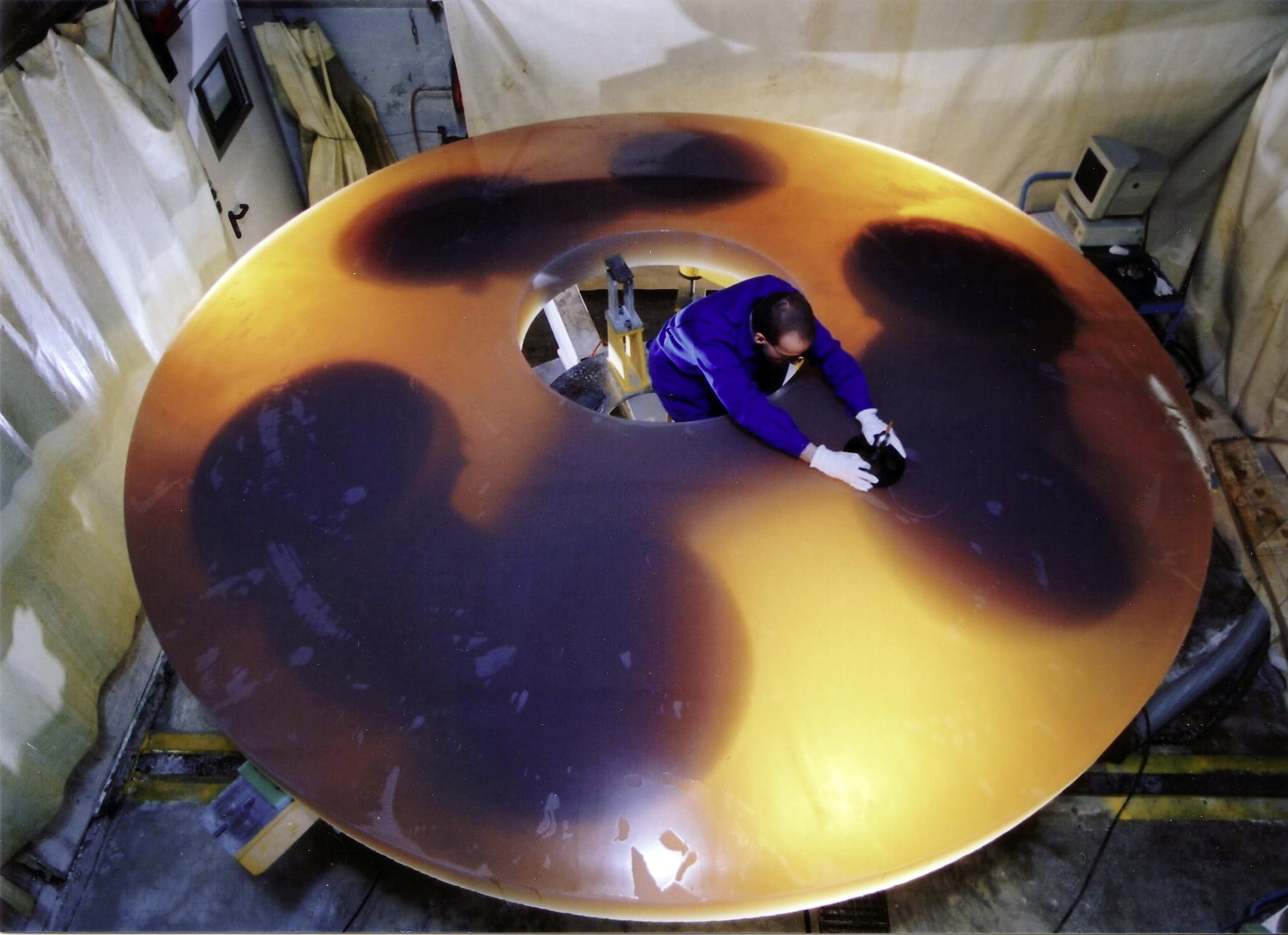
The 4.1 m main VISTA mirror undergoing optical testing.

VISTA can also stare far beyond our galaxy. In the example on the left (below the image of the Orion Nebula) the telescope took a family photograph of a cluster of galaxies in the constellation of Fornax (the Chemical Furnace). The wide field allows many galaxies to be captured in a single image including the striking barred-spiral NGC 1365 and the big elliptical galaxy NGC 1399. The image was constructed from images taken through Z, J and Ks filters in the near-infrared part of the spectrum and has captured many of the cluster members in a single image. At the lower-right is the elegant barred-spiral galaxy NGC 1365 and to the left the big elliptical NGC 1399, surrounded by a swarm of faint globular clusters. The image is about 1 degree by 1.5 degrees in extent and the total exposure time was 25 minutes.

== Technical details ==
=== Telescope design ===
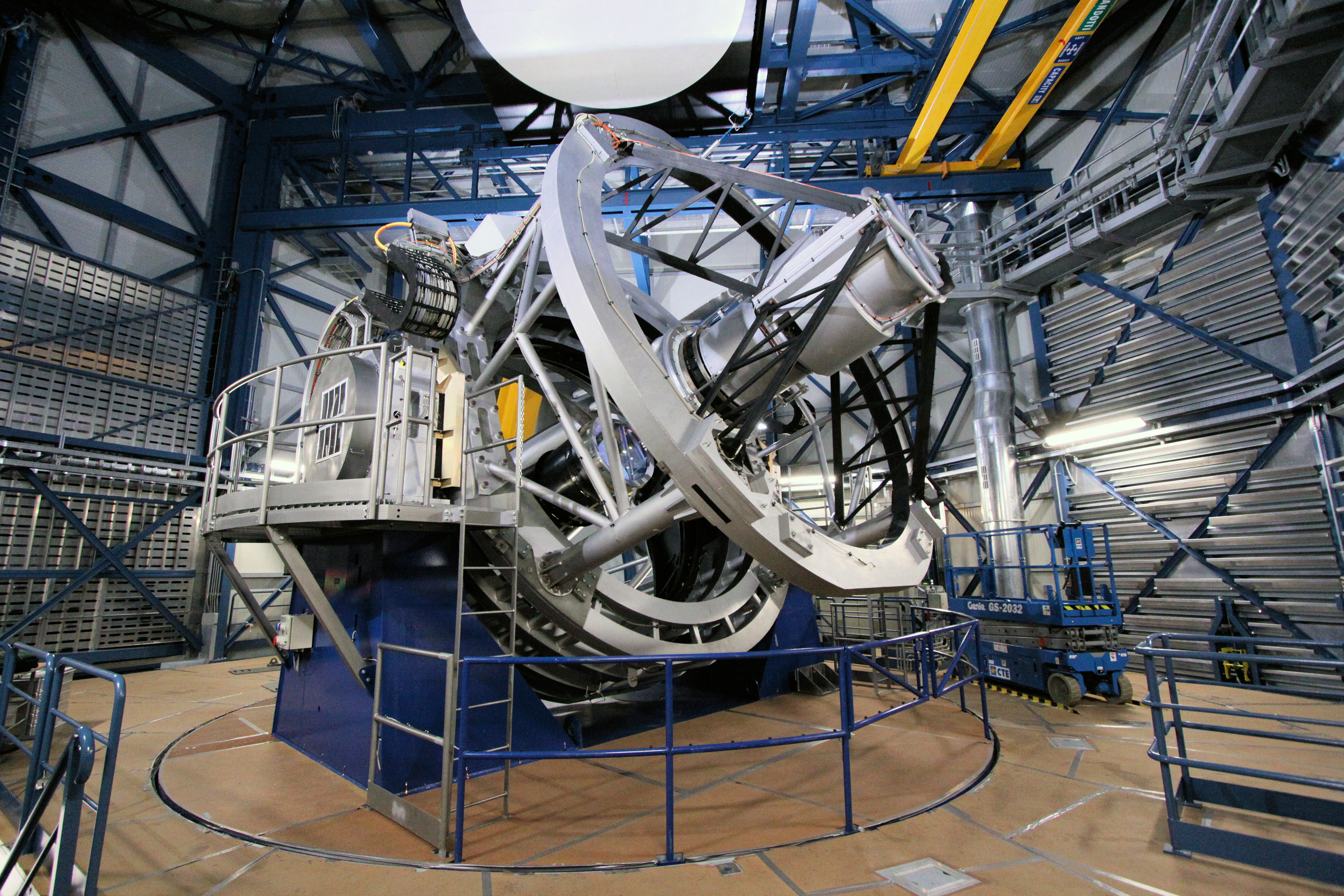
Inside its enclosure (Credit: ESO)

The objective to repeatedly image large areas of sky at seeing-limited resolution led to a unique optical design. The primary mirror is a concave hyperboloid with 4.1 m diameter and about f/1 focal ratio. The mirror has a meniscus shape of 17 cm thickness with a central 1.2 m hole to accommodate the camera at the Cassegrain focus. It was cast from Zerodur by Schott in Germany and subsequently polished and figured by LZOS, Moscow. It is the largest mirror of this shape and of such short focal ratio; polishing it took 2 years, which was longer than anticipated. The mirror is supported by a number of actuators (81 on the back and 24 around the edge), which allow its shape to be controlled by computers.

The secondary mirror is a convex hyperboloid of 1.24 m diameter. The combination of the two hyperbolic mirrors makes this a quasi-Ritchey-Chrétien design. The combined focal ratio is about f/3, but the image quality of the two mirrors alone would be poor. The secondary mirror is mounted on a hexapod support so that its position, tip, and tilt are also computer-controlled.

The infrared camera was built by a consortium composed of the Rutherford Appleton Laboratory, the UK Astronomy Technology Centre, and Durham University, and is the world's largest at almost three tonnes. Telescope and camera form a single optical design, as the three field correction lenses in the camera are essential for the projection of a focussed image of the sky on the detectors.

For an infrared camera, it is also vital to block heat radiation from the telescope and dome. This is accomplished by a sequence of cooled baffles in front of the field corrector lenses. Also, the secondary mirror is undersized to avoid edge detectors viewing warm structure outside the edge of the primary; this means the aperture seen by any point in the image plane is 3.7 m. This design requires the camera's vacuum cryostat – which cools the detectors as well as the baffles – to be more than 2 m long, with a front window of 95 cm diameter. A filter wheel just in front of the detectors allows the selection of a particular infrared wavelength range.

Over an area corresponding to 1.65° diameter on the sky, the image plane has 16 arrays of infrared detectors, each array with 2048x2048 pixels of 20 μm size, corresponding on average to 0.34" on the sky. The focal length of 12.1 m combines with the baffled aperture of 3.7 m to a focal ratio of 3.26. The arrays are separated by 90% of their width in one direction and by just under 50% their width in the other direction. A single exposure therefore corresponds to a patchy "paw print" on the sky. To fill the gaps and obtain a conventional image at least six shifted paw prints have to be combined into a "tile", which then is 1.5° by 1.0°. The image plane of the camera also has wave front detectors used to control the shape of the primary mirror and the position and tip/tilt of the secondary mirror (active optics). This compensates for flexure and ensures a focused image at all altitudes.

The hilltop where VISTA is located was flattened to erect the enclosure building and an auxiliary building. The auxiliary building includes facilities to wash, strip, and coat the primary mirror. The coating can be in aluminium, or normally in protected silver for better infrared performance. The fixed base of the enclosure supports the rotating steel dome. Two sliding doors form the dome slit. Further dome panels can be opened to increase ventilation, and a wind shield can be deployed to close parts of the slit. During the day, the dome is kept at night-time temperature.

=== Operation and data flow ===
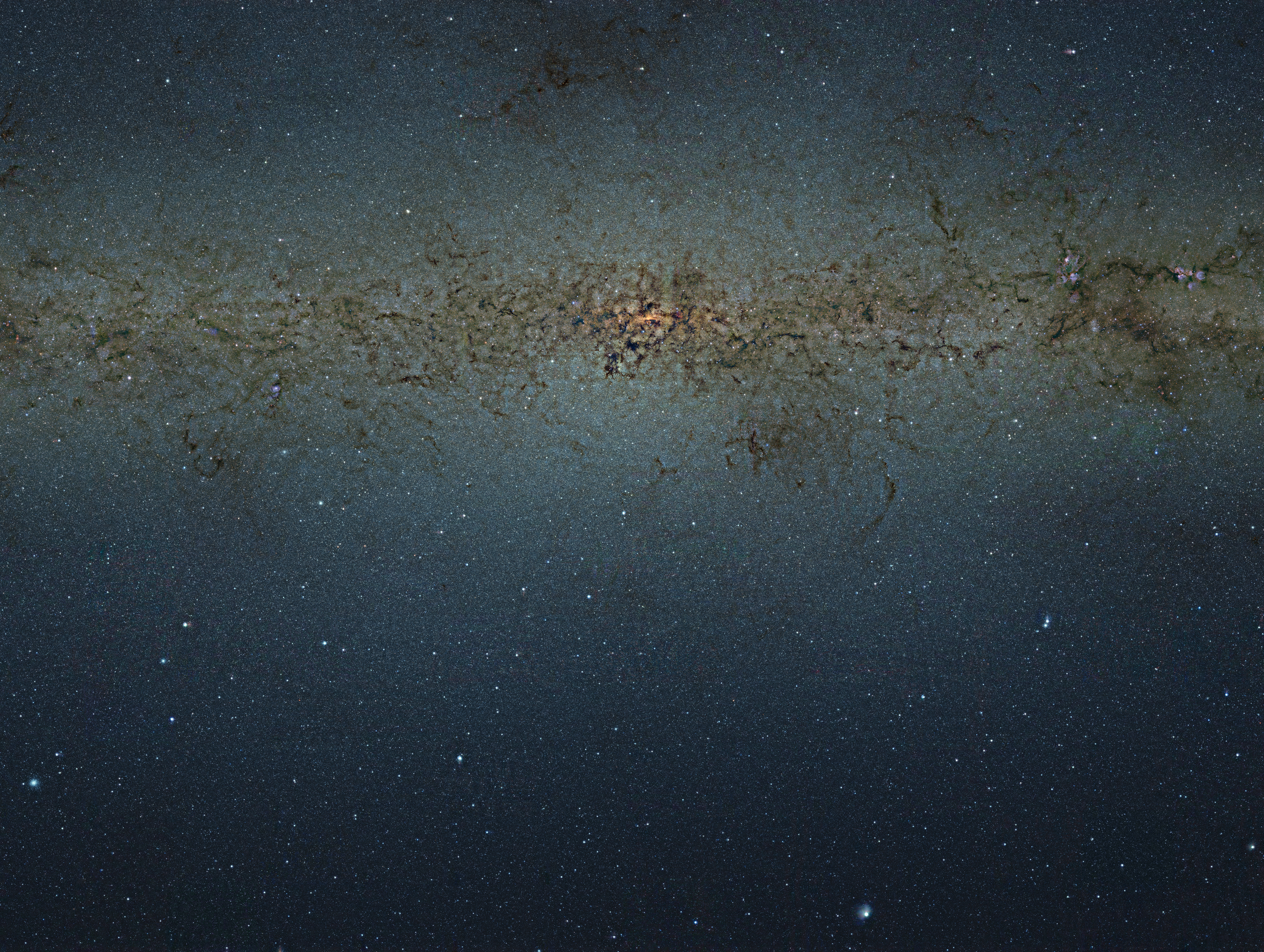
VISTA gigapixel mosaic of the central parts of the Milky Way.

On completion, the telescope was handed over to ESO, which selected six public surveys for VISTA, taking up 75% of the available observing time. Proprietary surveys to occupy the remaining time are proposed to ESO, which will schedule approved proposals for observation. The observations are carried out by operators at the Paranal Observatory, remotely from the VLT control building.

The combination of the large detector array and the short and frequent exposures necessary at infrared wavelengths results in a high data rate of 200–300 GB per night. A quick-look reduction at the Paranal Observatory is used for daily quality control, but the principal data flow is to transfer the raw data to ESO headquarters in Garching near Munich, Germany, for ingestion into the data archive. Users can extract paw prints (see above) and pass them through a calibration pipeline to remove instrumental artefacts and calibrate the astrometry and photometry. The archive data were also copied to the VISTA Data Flow System in the UK, where the paw prints were combined into tiles (see above) and where source catalogues were prepared from these.

== See also ==
- List of largest infrared telescopes
- VLT Survey Telescope
- Very Large Telescope
- European Southern Observatory
