= Paranal Observatory =

Astronomical observatory in Chile

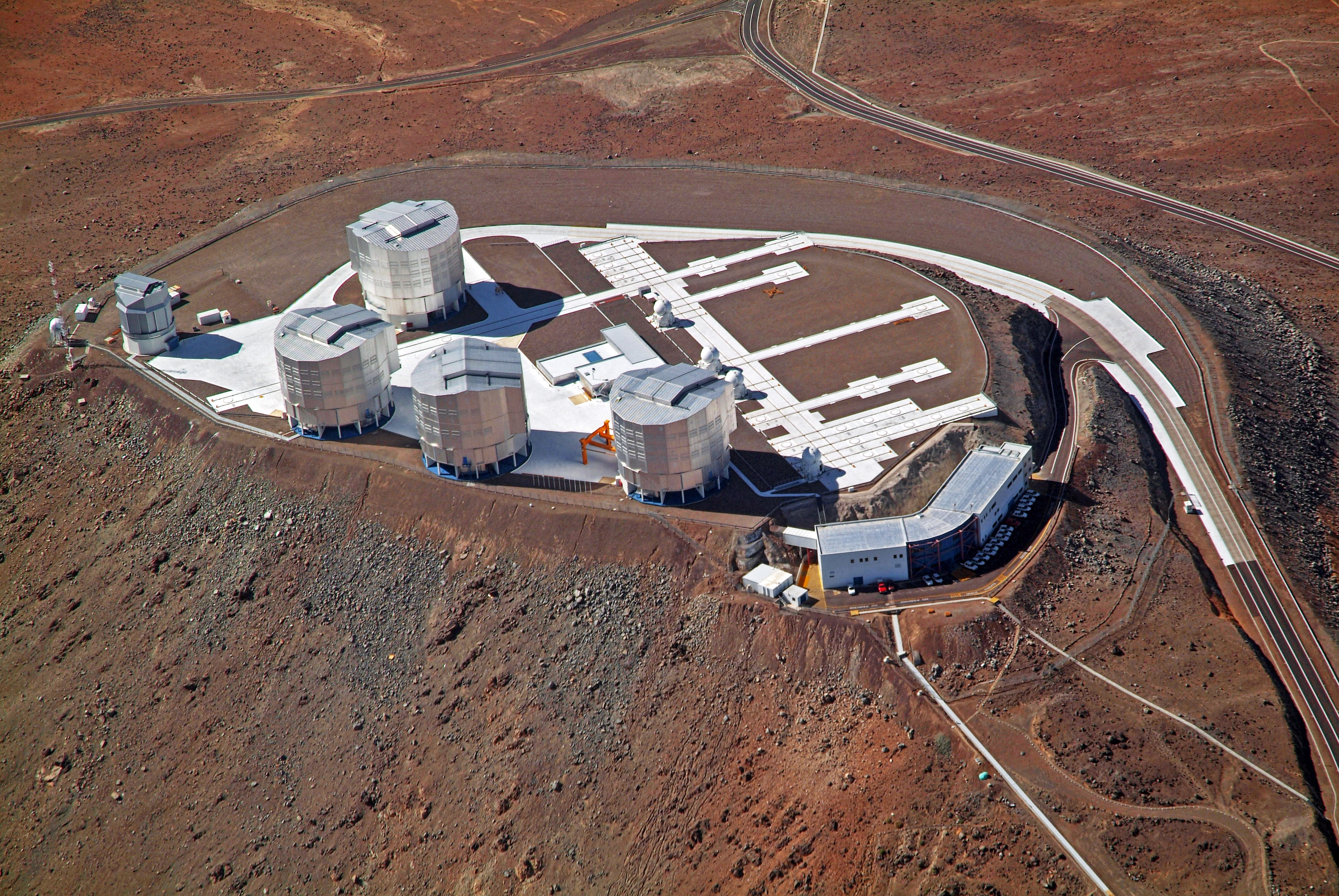
- Alternative names: ESO's Paranal Observatory
- Organization: European Southern Observatory
- Observatory code: 309
- Location: Cerro Paranal, Antofagasta Province, Antofagasta Region, Chile
- Coordinates: 24°37′38″S 70°24′15″W
- Altitude: 2,635 m (8,645 ft)
- Established: 1 April 1999
- Website: www.eso.org/public/teles-instr/paranal-observatory/
- Telescopes: Cherenkov Telescope Array Observatory; Next-Generation Transit Survey; SPECULOOS; VISTA; VLT Survey Telescope; Very Large Telescope
- Related media on Commons

Paranal Observatory is an astronomical observatory operated by the European Southern Observatory (ESO). It is located in the Atacama Desert of Northern Chile on Cerro Paranal at 2,635 m (8,645 ft) altitude, 120 km (70 mi) south of Antofagasta. By total light-collecting area, it is the largest optical-infrared observatory in the Southern Hemisphere; worldwide, it is second to the Mauna Kea Observatory on Hawaii.

The Very Large Telescope (VLT), the largest telescope on Paranal, is composed of four separate 8.2 m (320 in) telescopes. In addition, the four main telescopes can be used simultaneously for extra light gathering capacity, and for interferometry. Four auxiliary telescopes of 1.8 m (71 in) each are also part of the VLTI to make it available when the main telescopes are being used for other projects. The site also houses two survey telescopes with wide fields of view, the 4.0 m (160 in) VISTA and the 2.6 m (100 in) VLT Survey Telescope for surveying large areas of the sky; and two arrays of small telescopes called NGTS and SPECULOOS which are dedicated to searching for exoplanets.

Two major new facilities are under construction nearby: the southern part of the Cherenkov Telescope Array gamma-ray telescope (not owned by ESO) will be sited in the grounds 10 km south-east of Paranal; while ESO's future E-ELT will be on the nearby peak of Cerro Armazones 20 km east of Paranal, and will share some of the base facilities.

== Telescopes ==
=== Aerial view ===
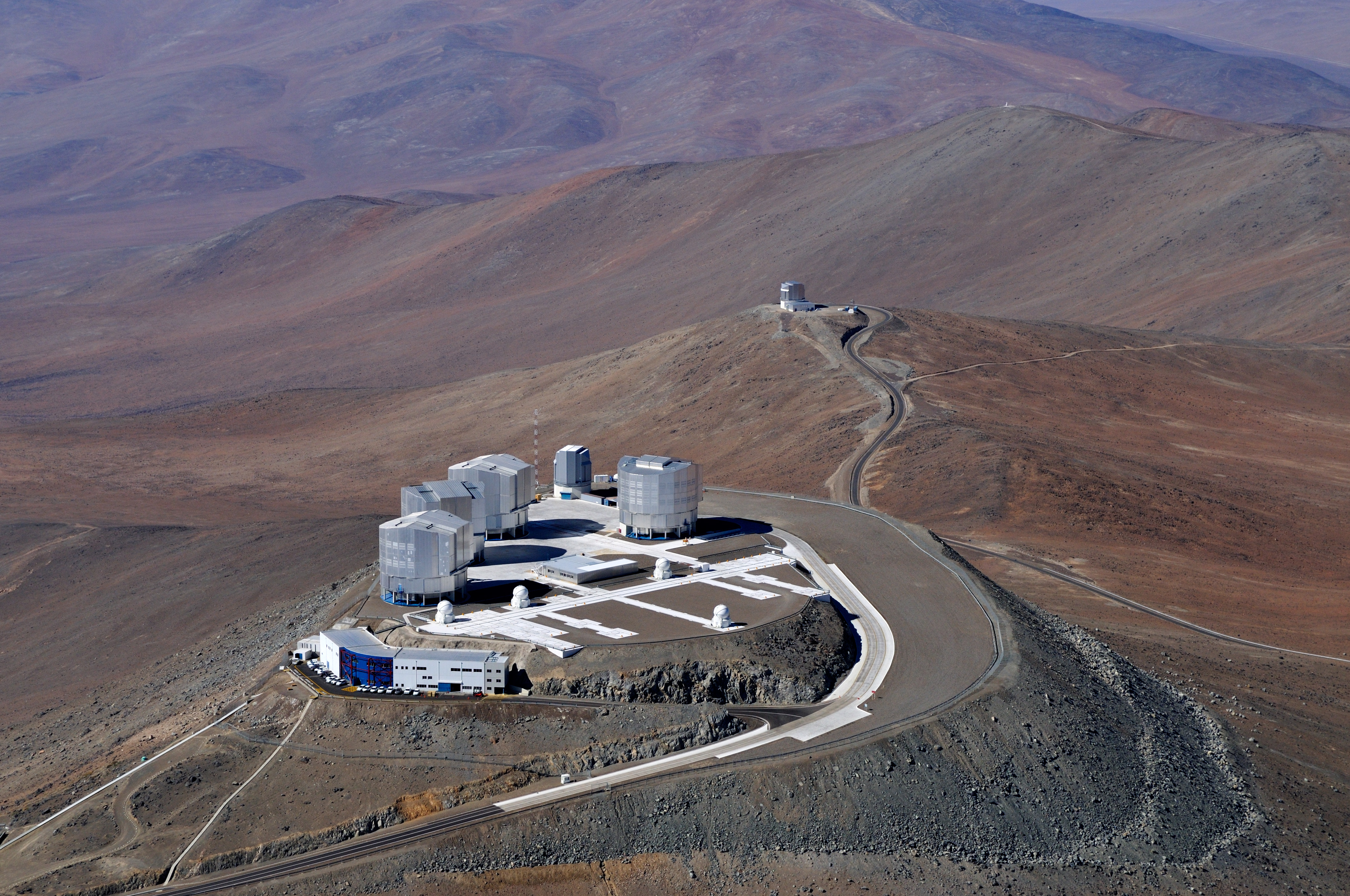
The four VLTs and ATs and the VST on the main peak and VISTA in the background

From an aerial view of the Paranal Observatory, the four large units of the VLT with their four small, dome-shaped auxiliary telescopes can be clearly seen. The Survey Telescope, VST, is immediately adjacent to the VLT and seen in between two of its units, while VISTA is located on a secondary peak, some 1,500 m away in the background (see image).

=== Very Large Telescope ===
The Very Large Telescope (VLT) consists of four 8.2-metre telescopes operating in the visible and infrared. These telescopes, along with four smaller auxiliary telescopes, are also combined to operate as an optical interferometer on certain nights of the year. All of the 8.2-metre telescopes have adaptive optics and a full suite of instruments. The primary mirrors of the main telescopes are 8.2 meters in diameter but, in practice, the pupil of the telescopes is defined by the secondary mirrors, effectively limiting the usable diameter to 8.0 meters.

=== VISTA Survey Telescope ===
VISTA is the Visible & Infrared Survey Telescope for Astronomy, a 4.0-metre telescope with a wide field of view, focusing on infrared surveys of the sky. It was built close to ESO's VLT by a consortium of 18 universities from the United Kingdom, led by Queen Mary University of London. VISTA was handed over to the European Southern Observatory in December 2009.

=== VLT Survey Telescope (VST) ===
The VLT Survey Telescope or VST is a 2.6-metre telescope with a wide field imager intended to aid the four Very Large Telescope (VLTs) in their scientific aims.

=== Next-Generation Transit Survey (NGTS) ===
The Next-Generation Transit Survey (NGTS) is an exoplanet-survey facility located a few kilometers from the main peak. It consists of an array of twelve 0.2-meter robotic telescopes with a very large field of view of 96 square degrees or several hundred times the area of the full moon. The survey aims to discover numerous super-Earths and Neptune-sized planets around nearby stars, using transit photometry to detect them. NGTS is managed by a partnership of seven academic institutions from Chile, Germany, Switzerland and the United Kingdom and its design is based on the SuperWASP project. Science operations began in early 2015.

=== SPECULOOS Southern Observatory (SSO) ===
The SPECULOOS Southern Observatory (SSO) consists out of four telescopes, called Europa, Io, Callisto, and Ganymede. ESO hosts the 1-meter telescopes and the project is led by the University of Liège. The project aims to find exoplanets around ultracool dwarf stars and brown dwarfs. The project builds on the success of the TRAPPIST telescope. The telescopes are located next to the NGTS.

== Other buildings ==
As well as the telescopes, control buildings and maintenance facilities, Paranal has a Residencia which provides accommodation for staff and visitors. This is located 200 m lower and 3 km from the telescopes. It is built half into the mountain with the concrete coloured to blend into the landscape. It has gym facilities, a swimming pool, a restaurant and two gardens. The construction was decorated by the Chilean architect Paula Gutiérrez Erlandsen, Marchioness of la Pica.

== Gallery ==
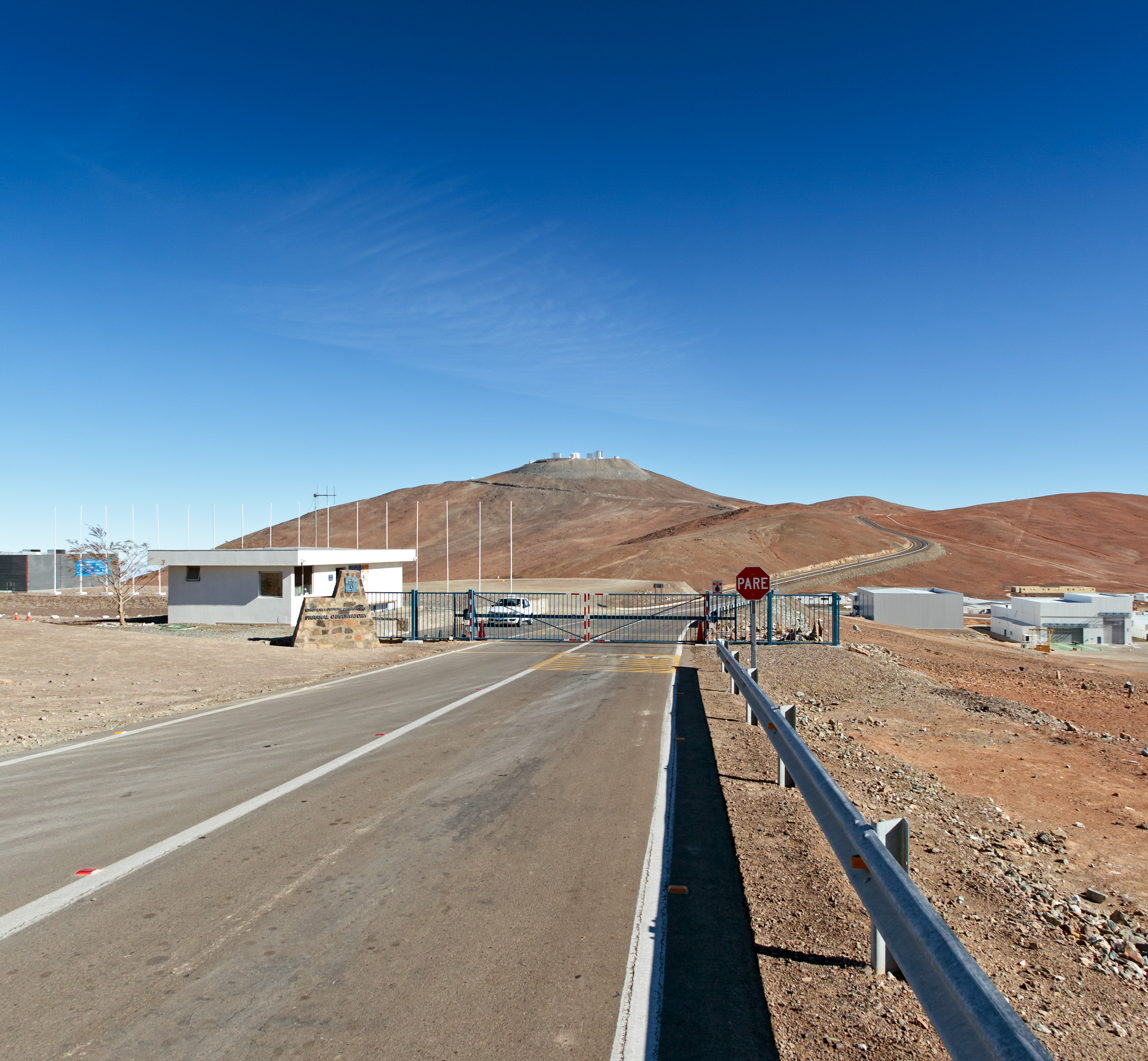
Main entrance of the Paranal Observatory

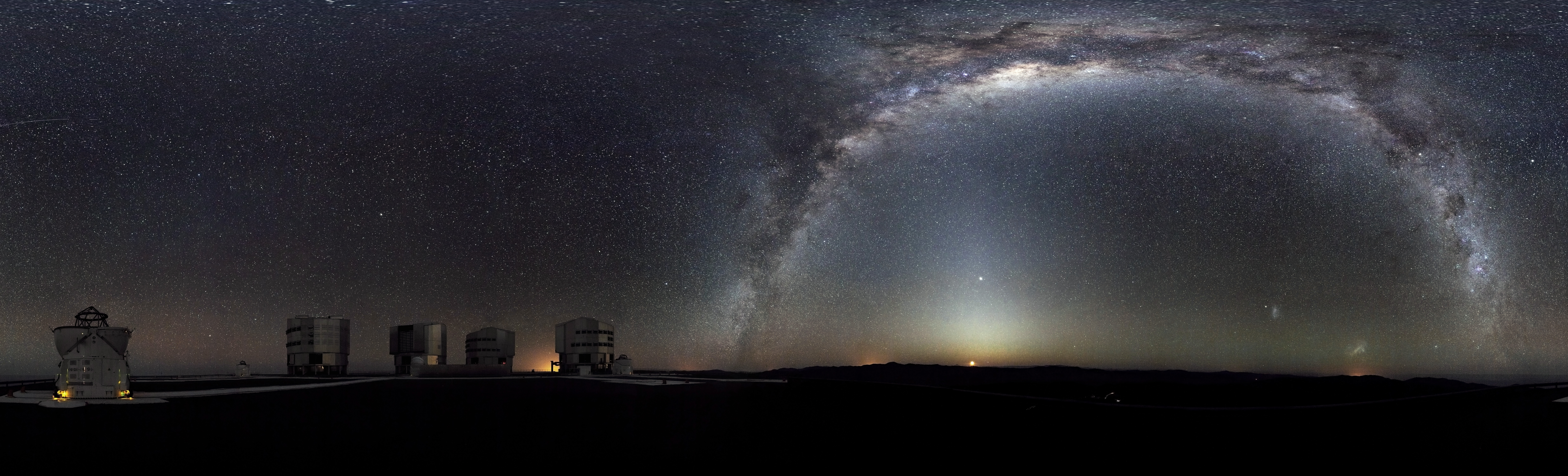
A 360-degree panorama of the southern sky above the Paranal platform

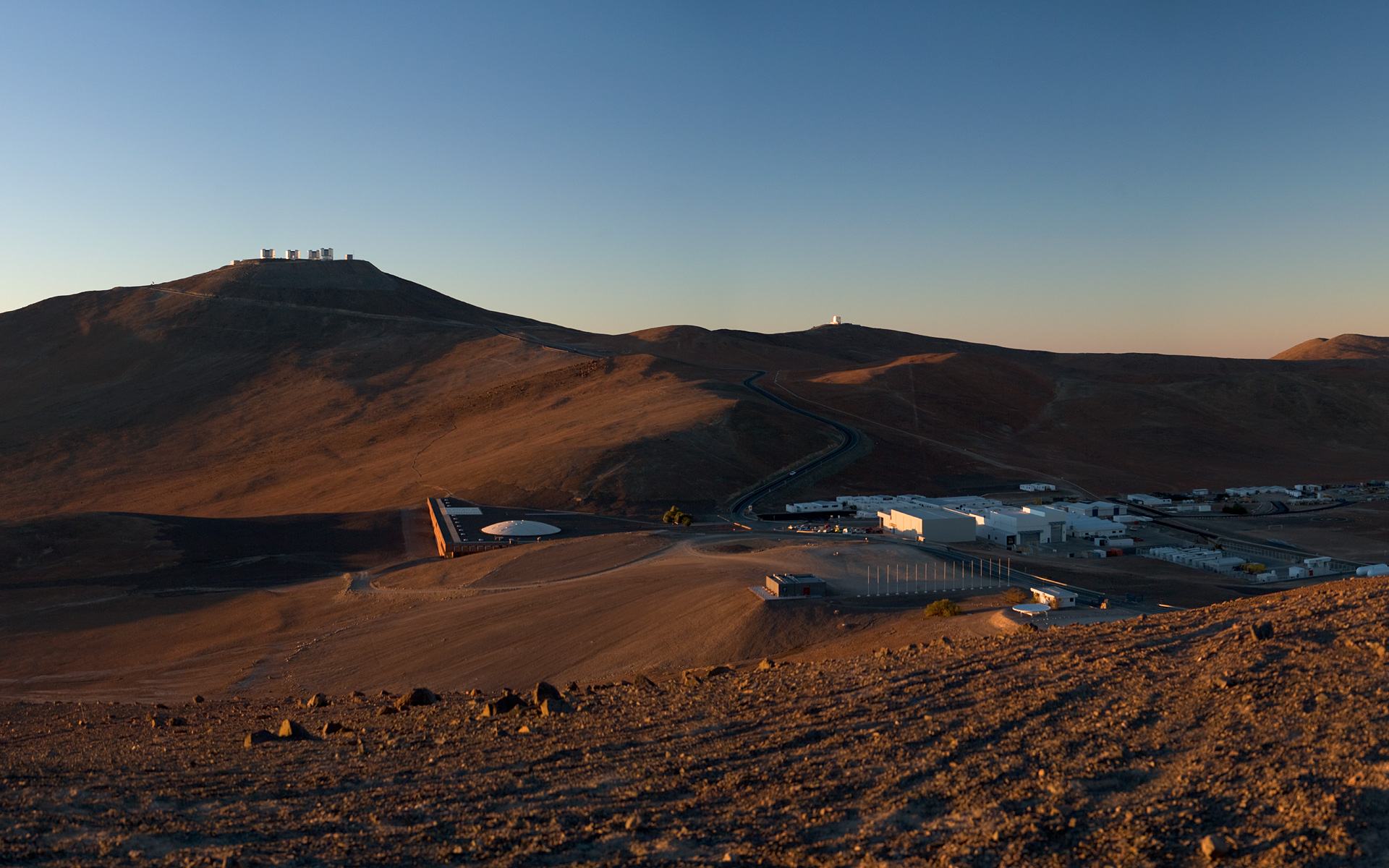
The ESO Residencia (center left) and basecamp at Paranal

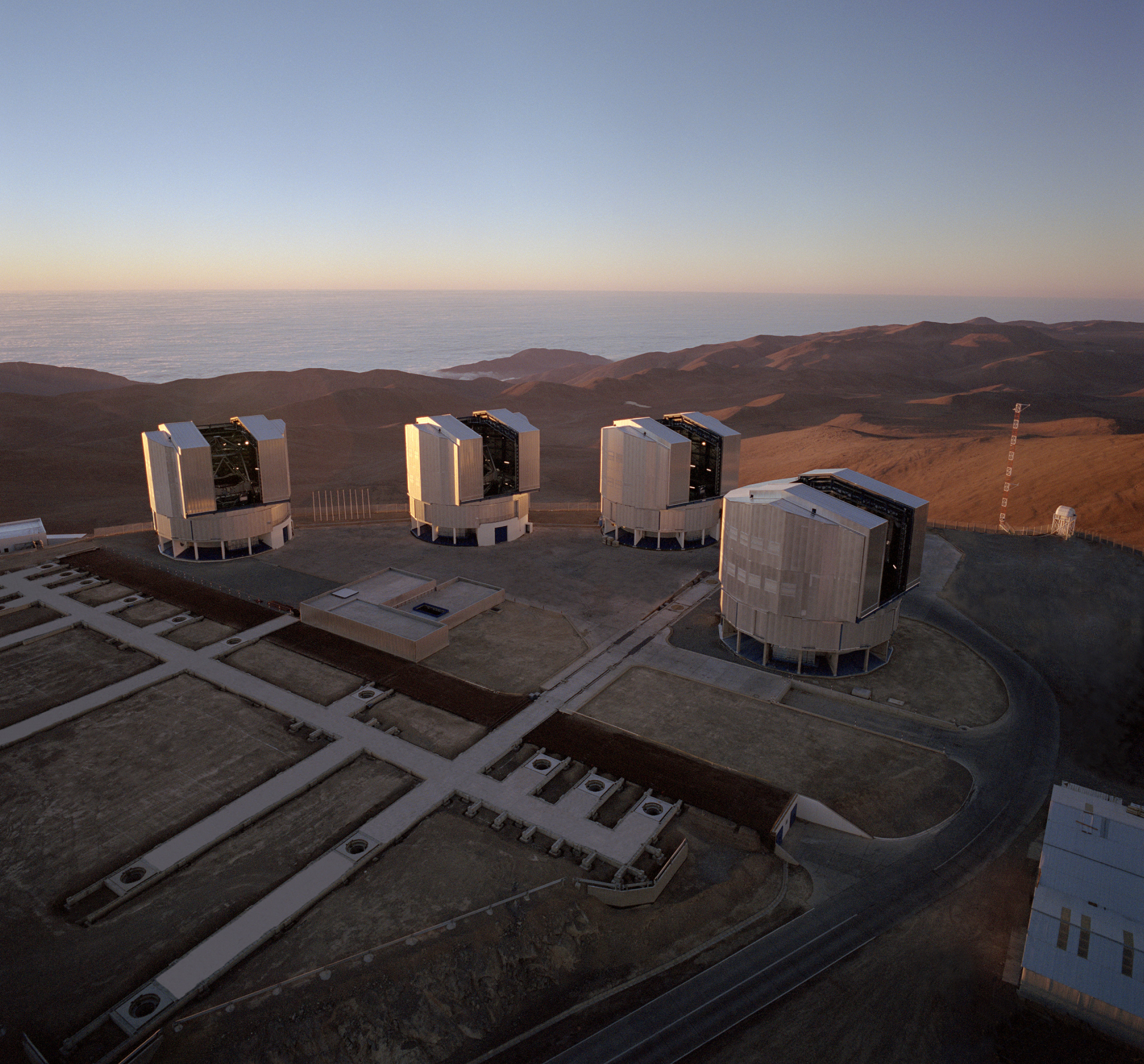
Aerial view

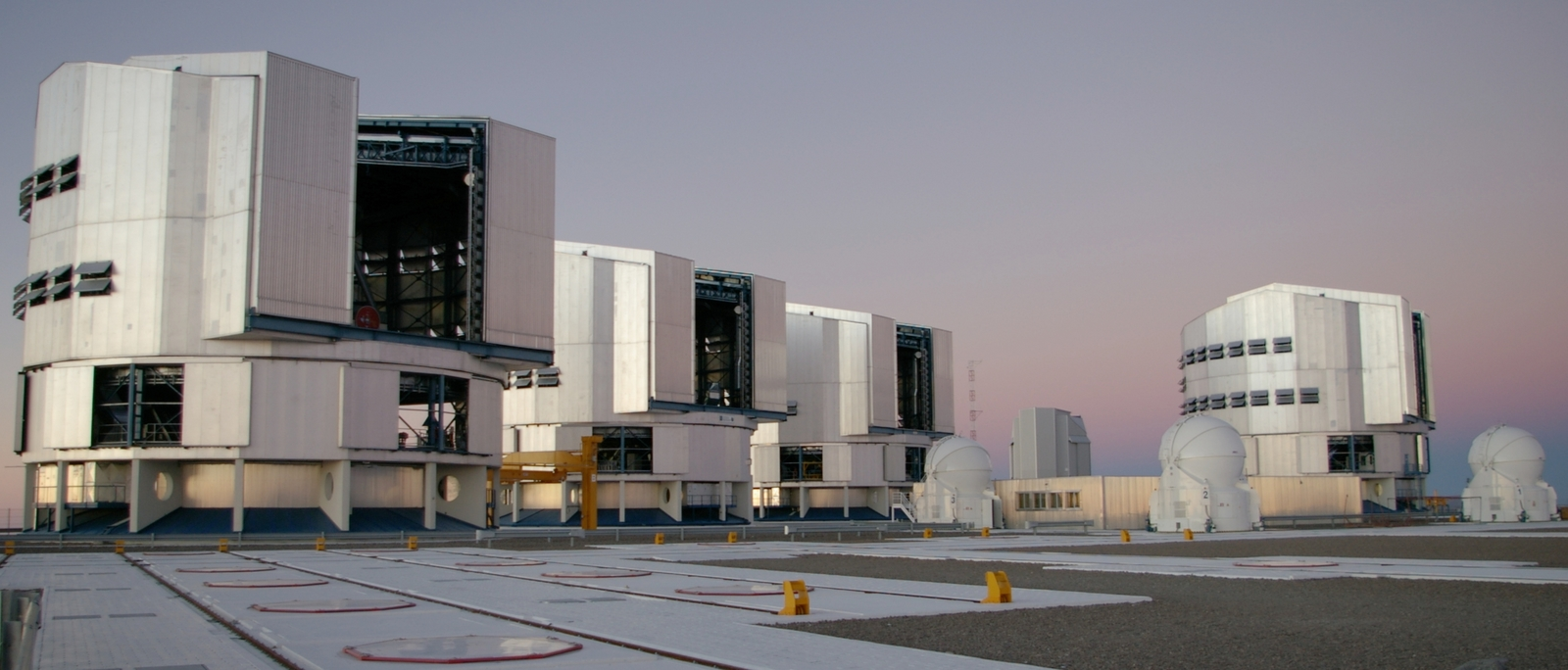
Paranal platform with the VLTs, the ATs and VST

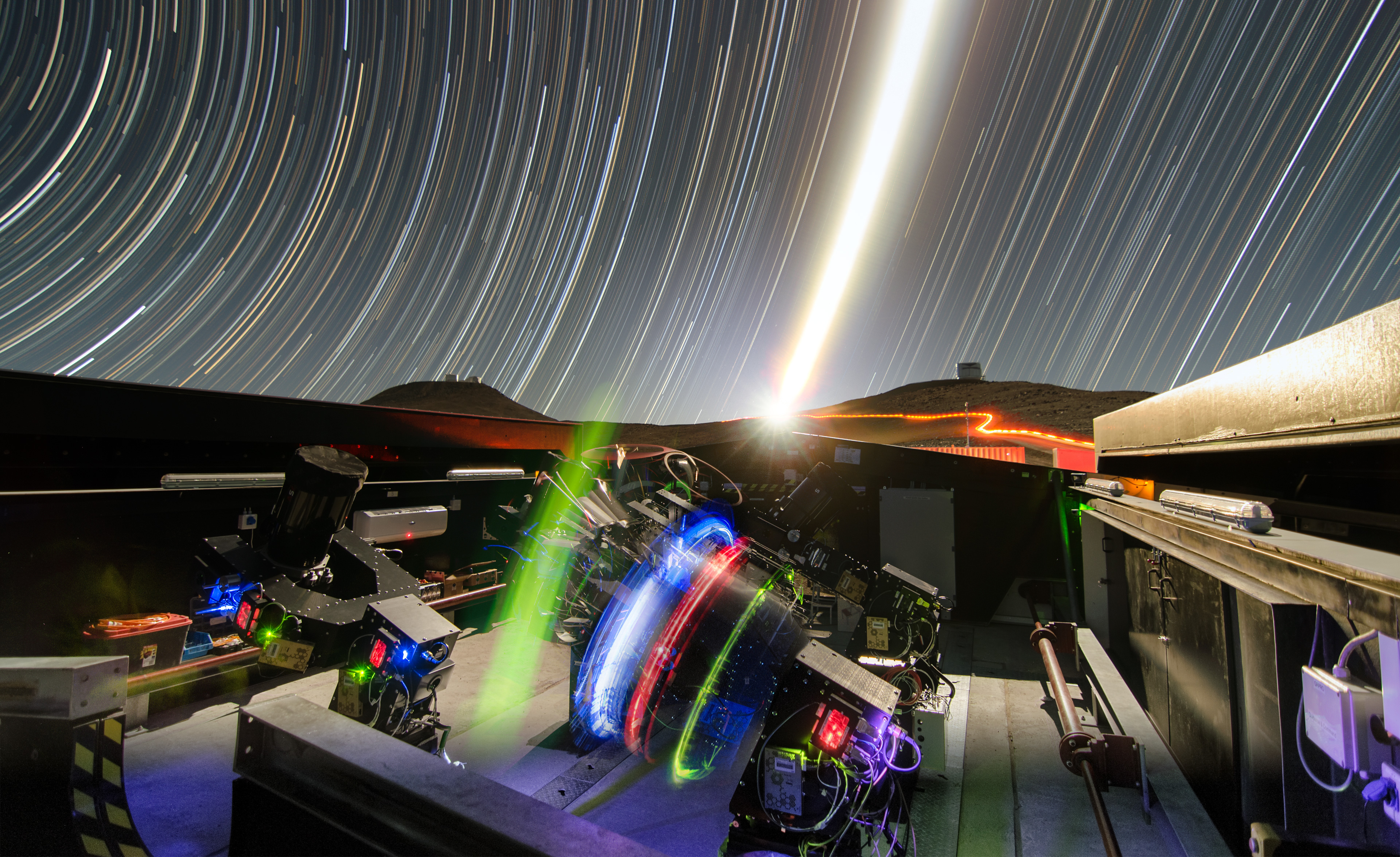
The NGTS with the VLT and VISTA (background)

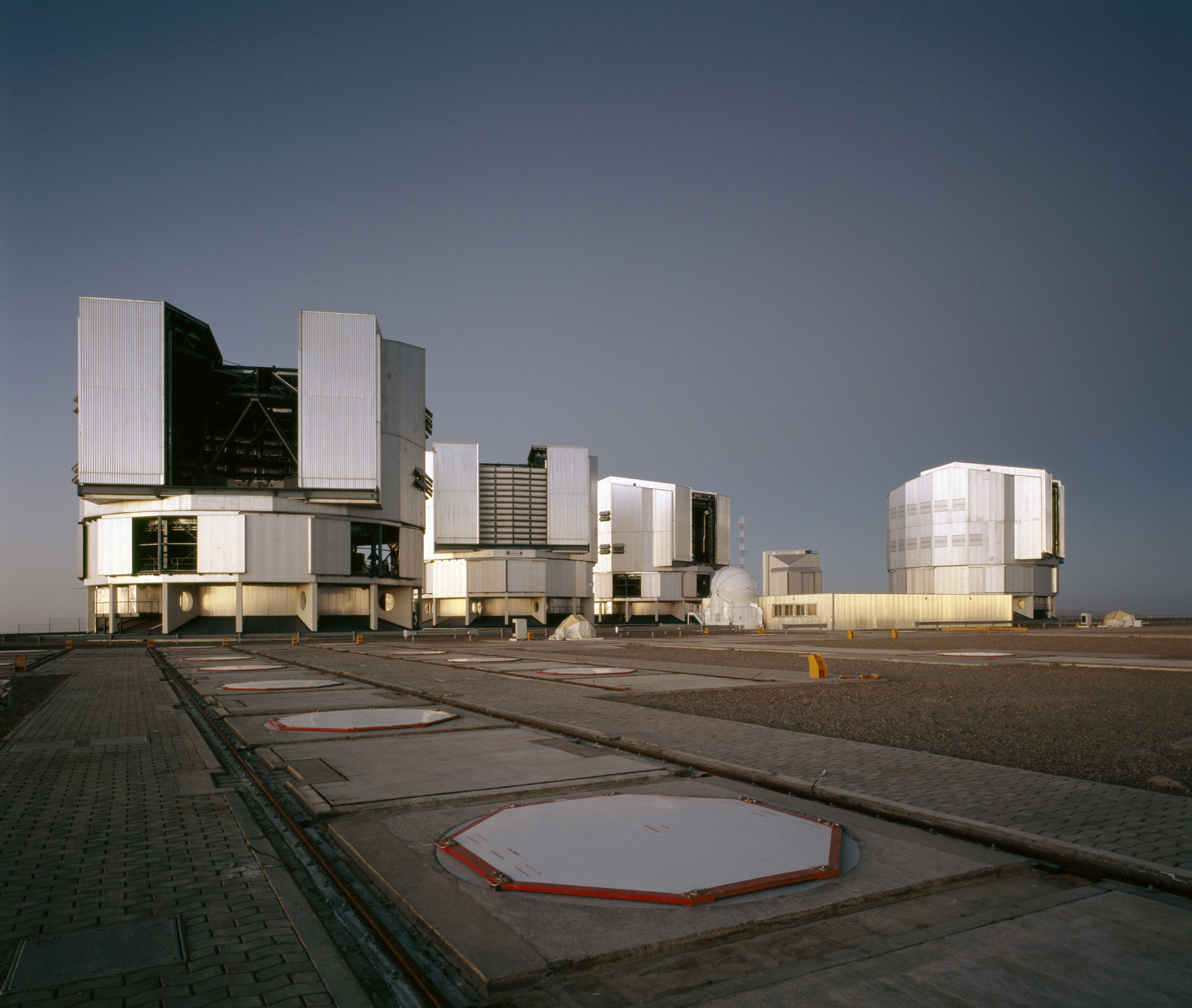
The platform as night sets

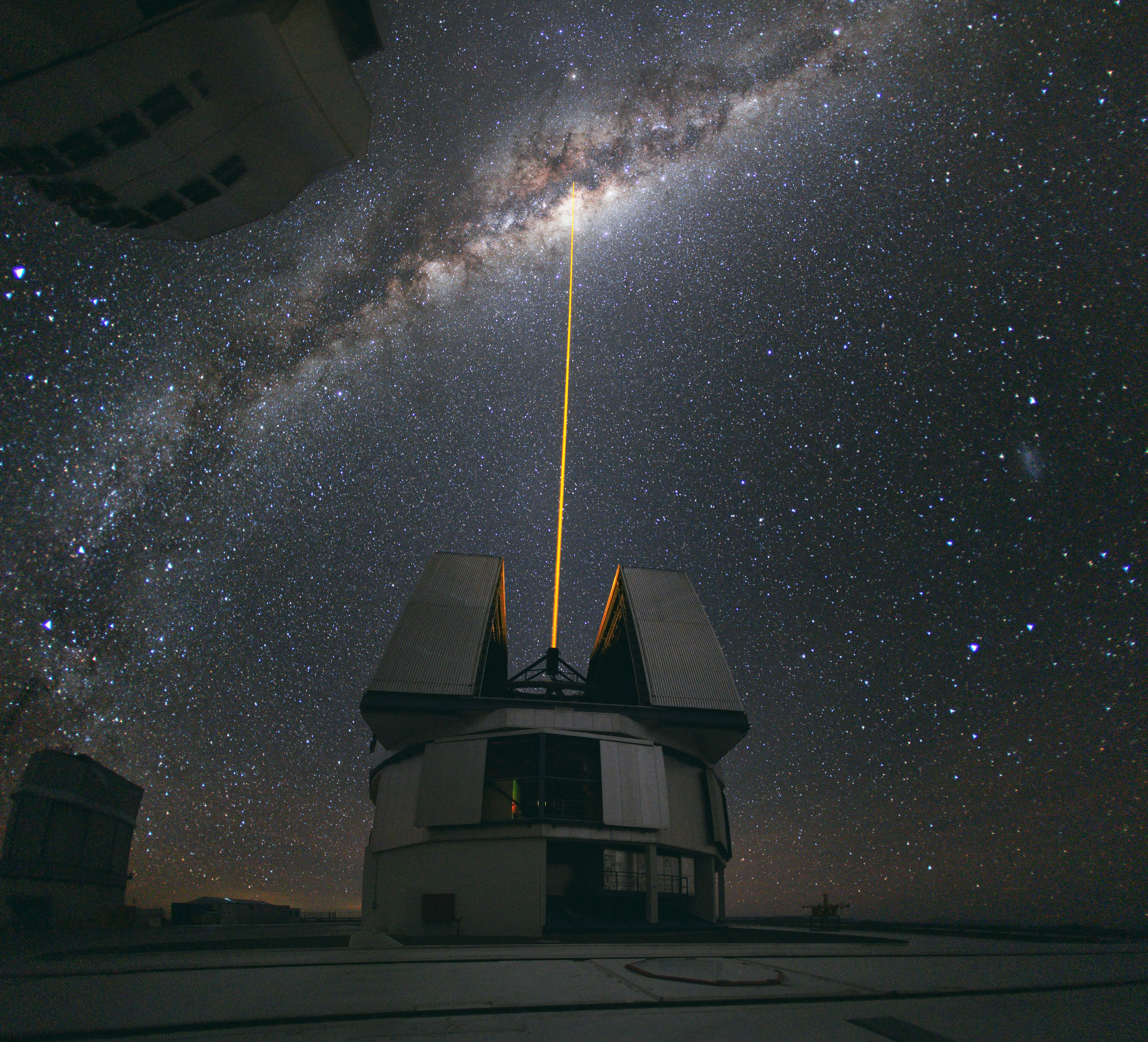
Beam of the laser guide star facility at VLT's Yepun Unit

Time-lapse taken at Paranal, showing the Magellanic Clouds

Full tour of the facility in LEGO form

This collection of video clips shows daily life at the observatory.

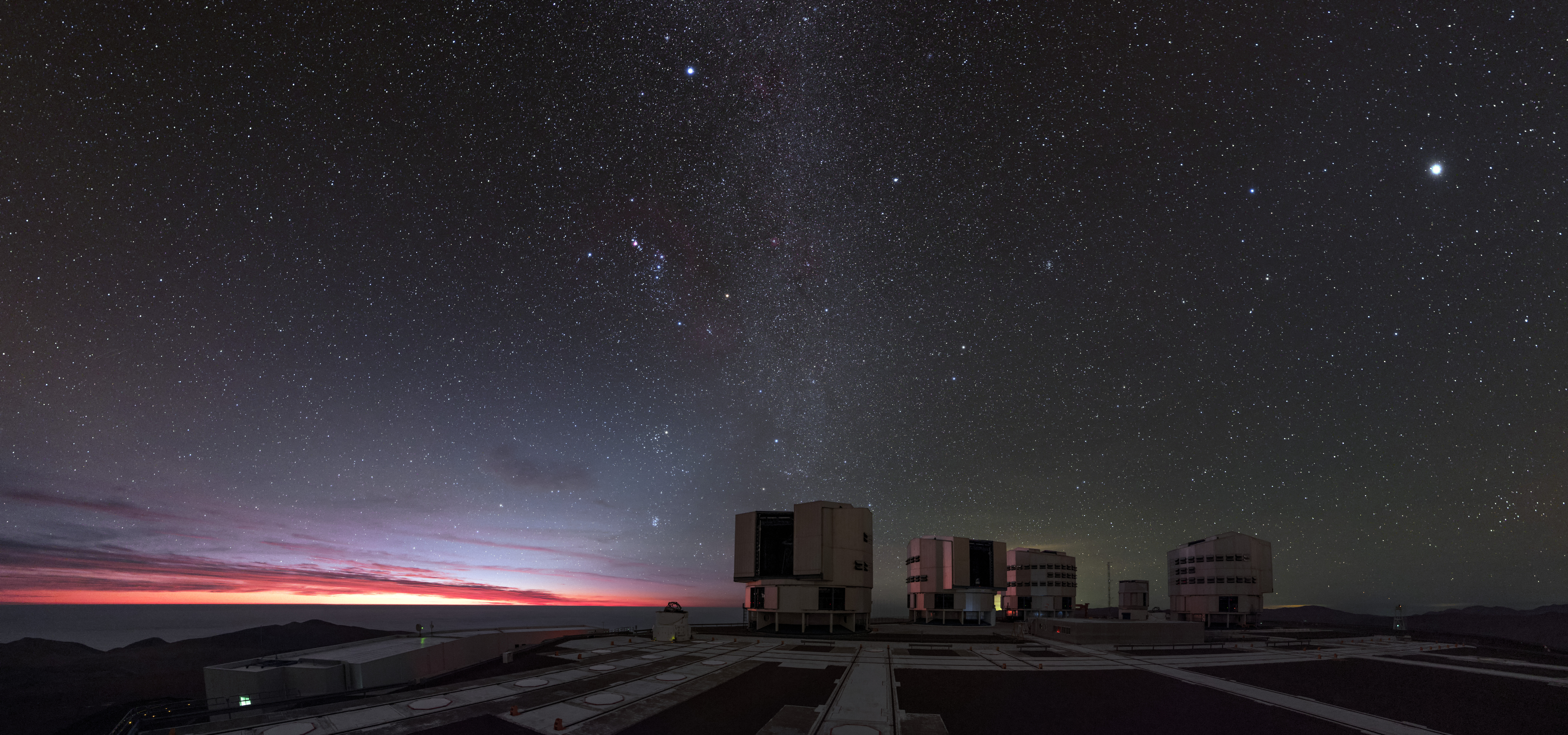
Tour the Skies

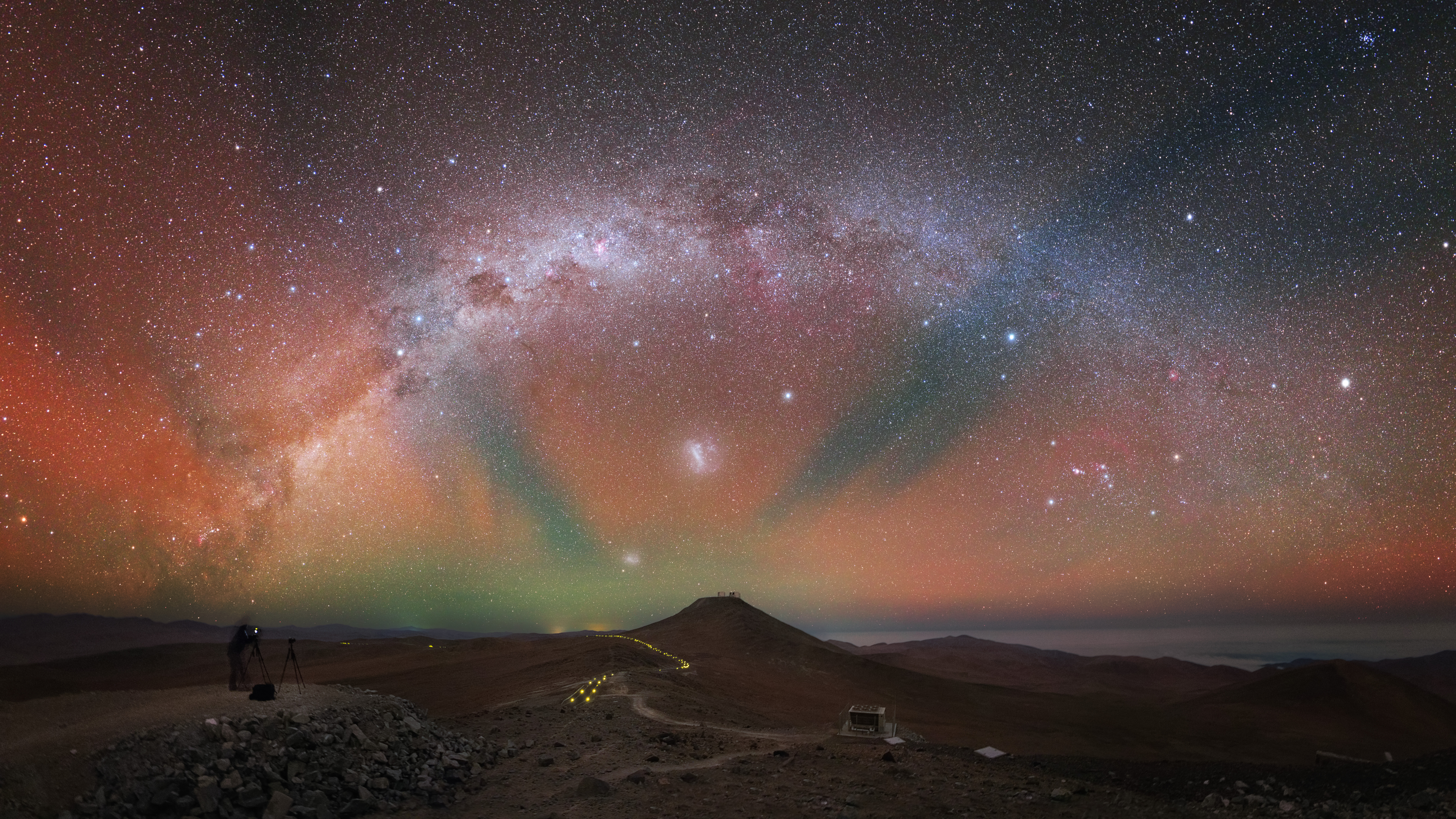
Colour in the air

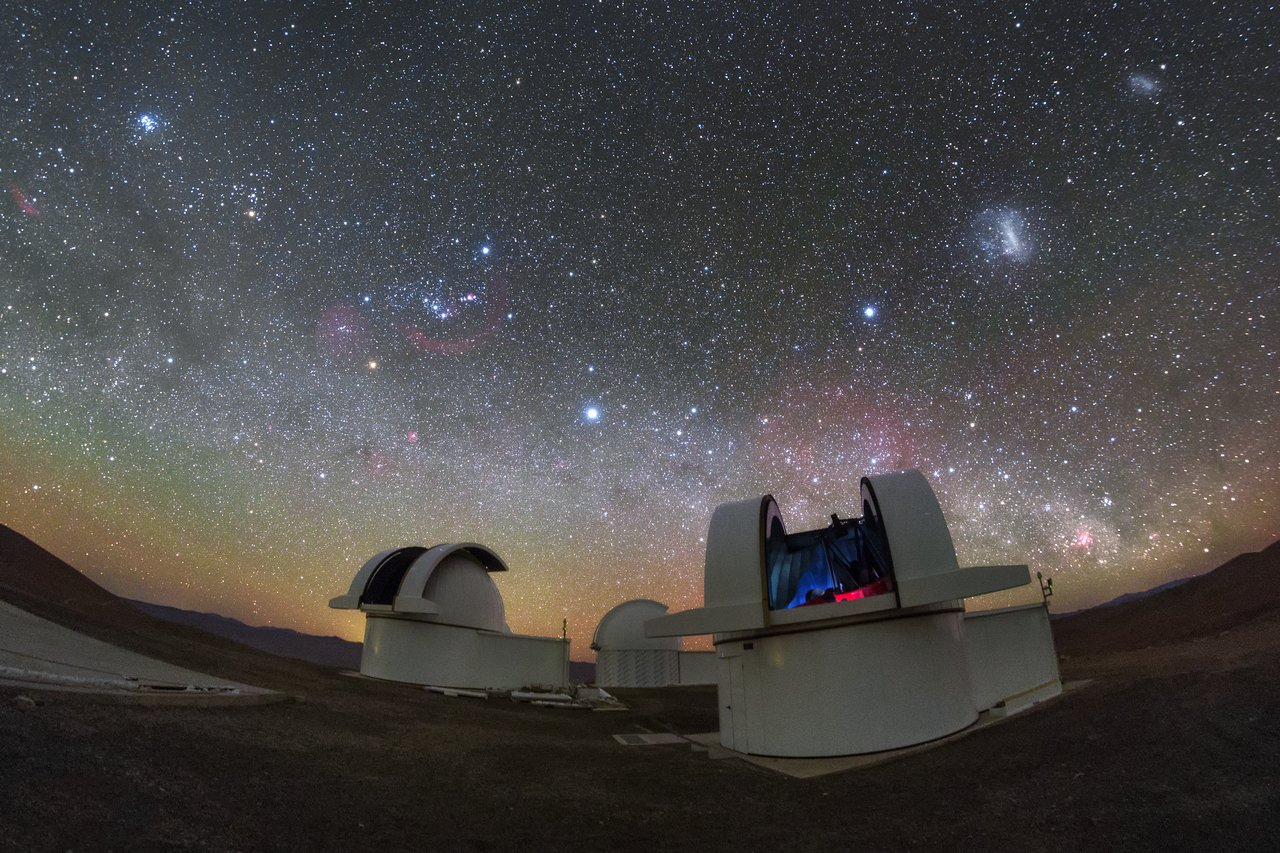
Three of the SPECULOOS telescopes

== Popular culture and other uses ==
To illustrate the isolation of the Paranal Observatory from the lights of civilization, it is located 38 kilometres (24 mi) in straight-line distance north of Paposo, population 259, the nearest community to the observatory.

The VLT hotel, the Residencia, served as a backdrop for part of the 2008 James Bond film Quantum of Solace.

The observatory's facilities were used to stage the Pacific Alliance's fourth summit in June 2012, formally launching the organization.

On 14 March 2013, Frederik, Crown Prince of Denmark, accompanied by his wife, Princess Mary, visited ESO's Paranal Observatory, as part of an official visit to Chile. Their tour of Paranal's astronomical facilities was led by ESO's Director General, Tim de Zeeuw.

The visit of the Prince and Princess of Asturias to the observatory

The Crown Prince of Denmark visits the observatory.

== See also ==
- Very Large Telescope
- List of largest optical reflecting telescopes
- List of astronomical observatories
- List of highest astronomical observatories
- Other observatories in Chile:
  - Llano de Chajnantor Observatory
    - Atacama Large Millimeter Array
  - Cerro Armazones Observatory
    - Extremely Large Telescope
  - La Silla Observatory
  - Cerro Tololo Inter-American Observatory
- European Northern Observatory
- VVV Survey
