= Cerro Paranal =

Mountain in Chile

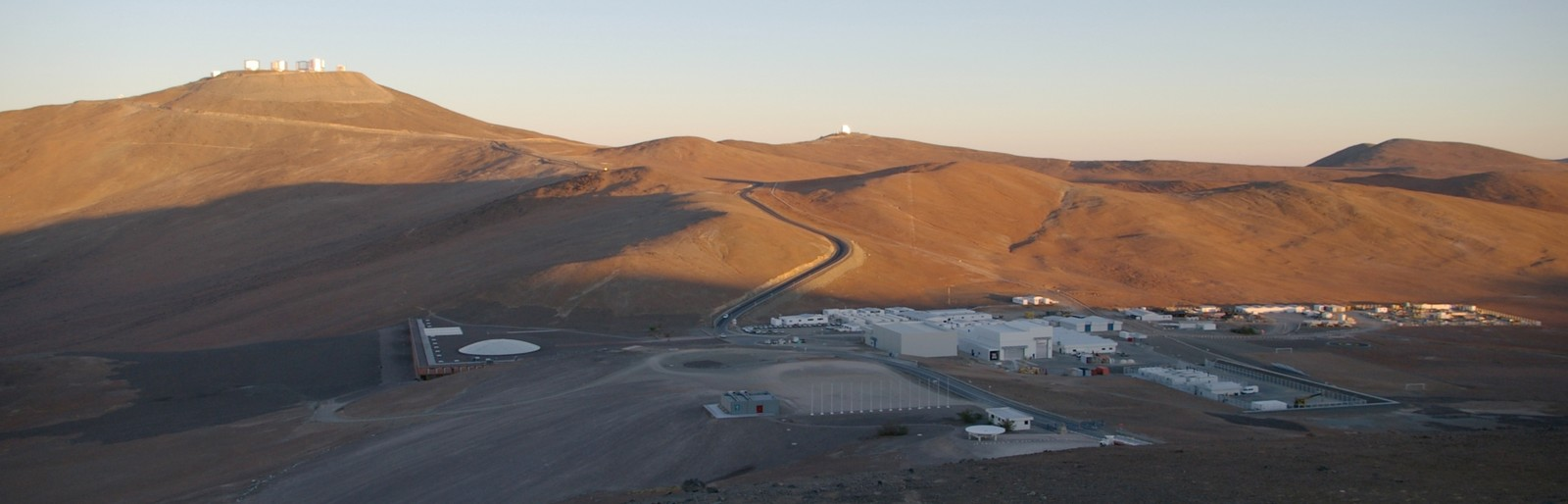
- Paranal camp

Highest point
- Elevation: 2,635 m (8,645 ft)
- Coordinates: 24°37′38″S 70°24′17″W

Geography
- Location: Atacama Desert, northern Chile
- Parent range: Chilean Coast Range

Cerro Paranal is a mountain in the Atacama Desert of northern Chile and is the home of the Paranal Observatory. Prior to the construction of the observatory, the summit was a horizontal control point with an elevation of 2,664 m (8,740 ft); now it is 2,635 m (8,645 ft) above sea level. It is the site of the Very Large Telescope and the VLT Survey Telescope. It is located 120 km (75 mi) south of Antofagasta and 80 km (50 mi) north of Taltal, as well as 15 km (9.3 mi) inland and 5 km (3.1 mi) west of highway B-710.

== Gallery ==
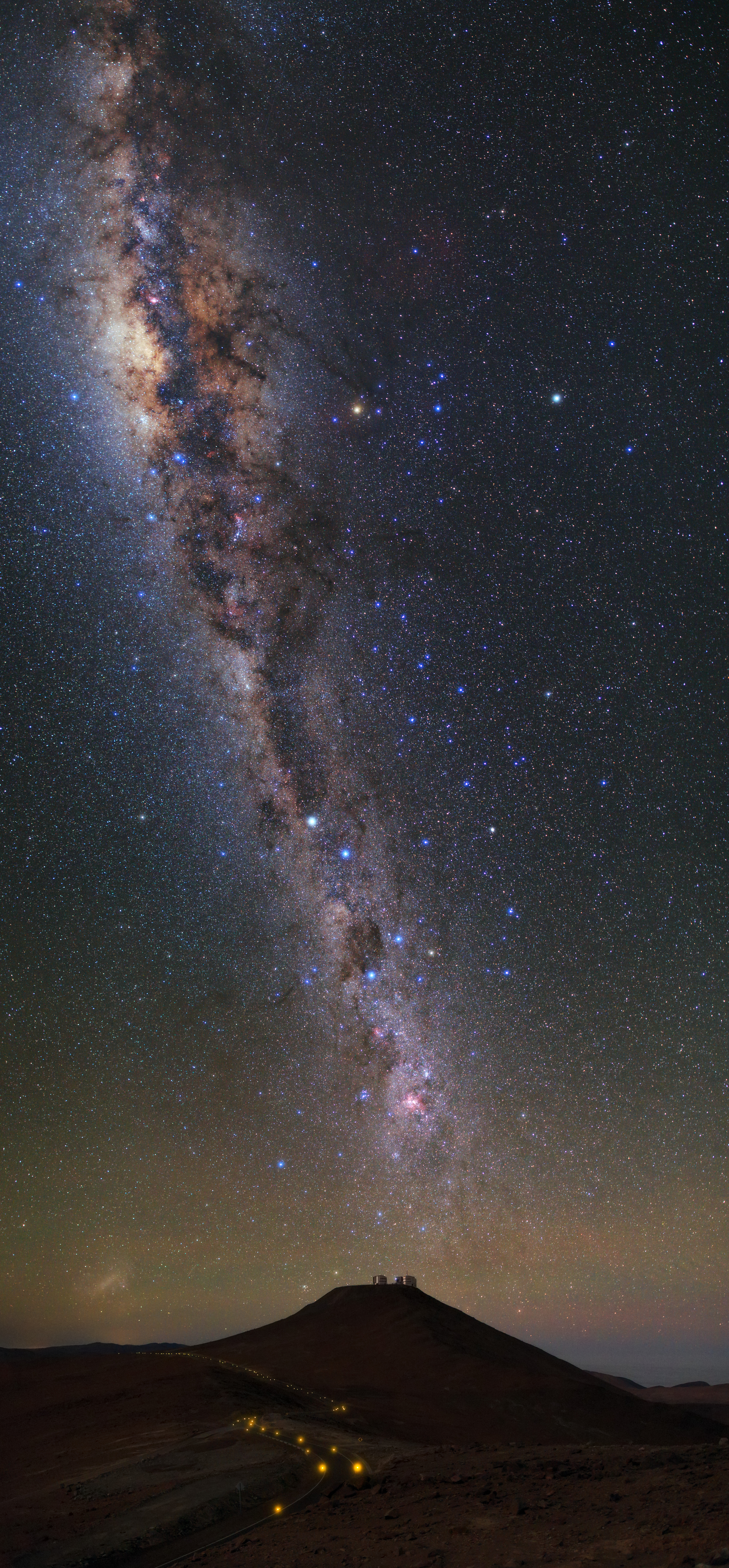
Milky Way pictured above Cerro Paranal

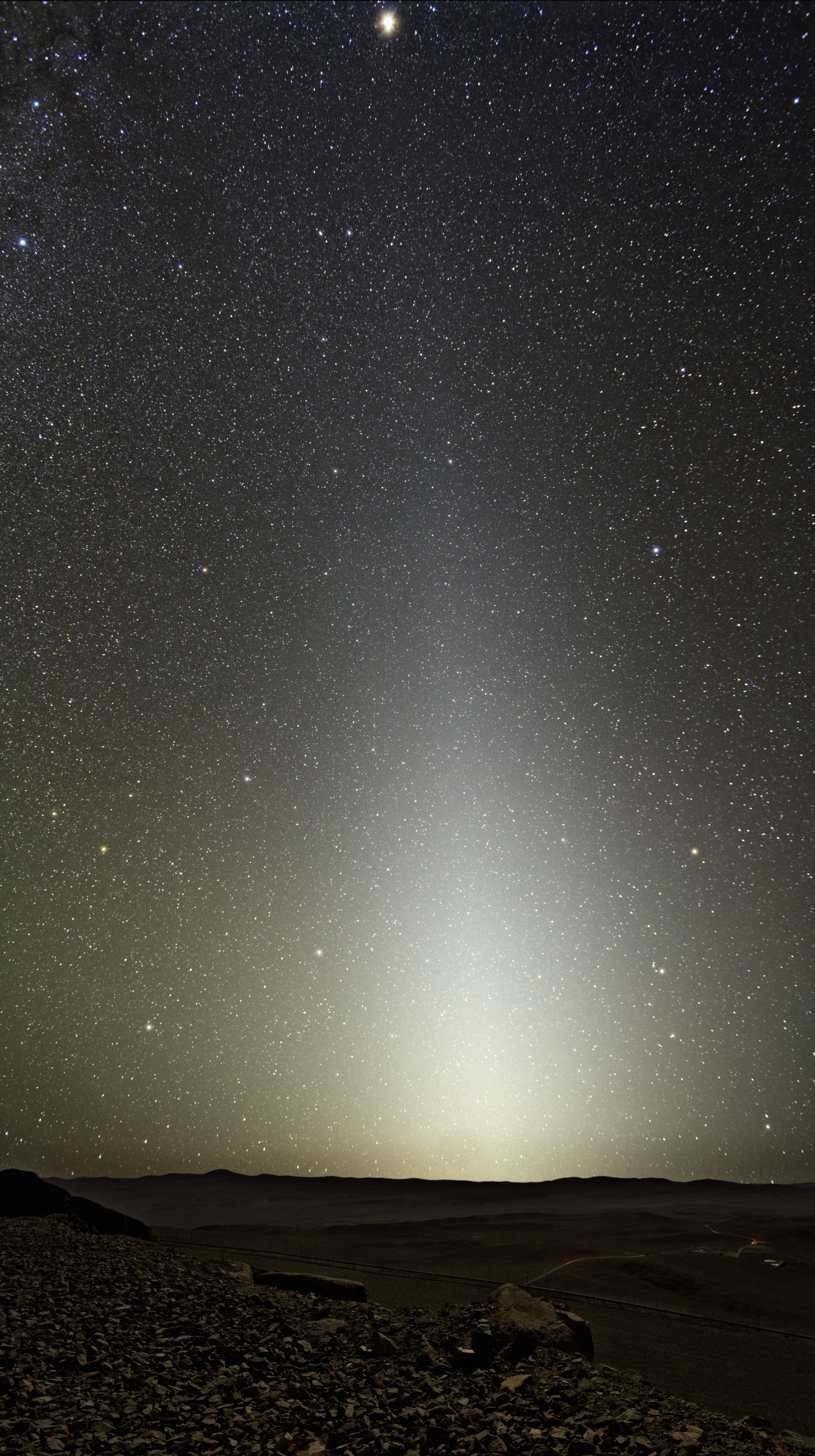
Zodiacal Light seen from Paranal
