= VLT Survey Telescope =

Telescope in the Atacama Desert, Chile

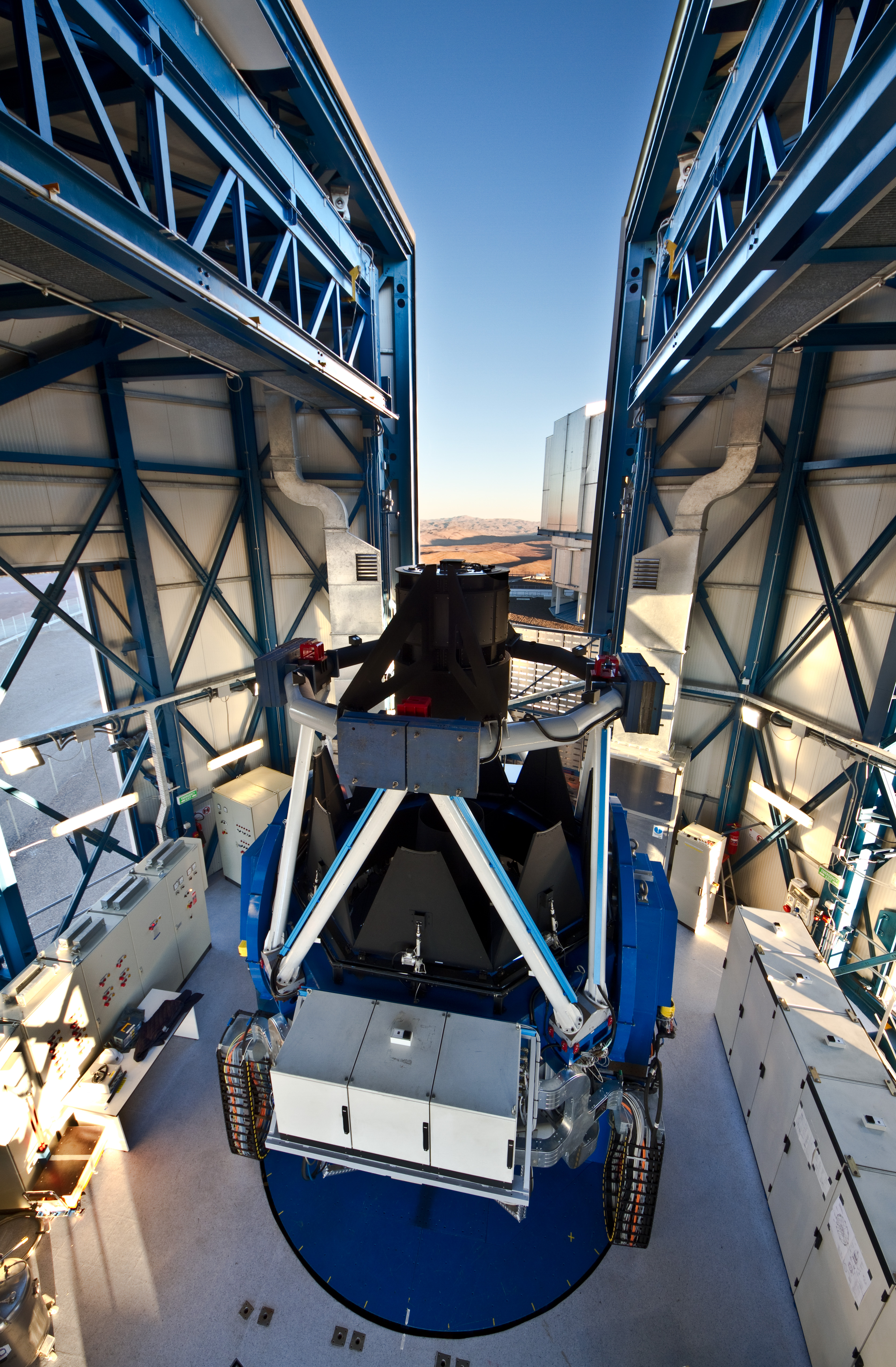
- Alternative names: VST
- Location(s): Cerro Paranal, Antofagasta Province, Antofagasta Region, Chile
- Coordinates: 24°37′41″S 70°24′18″W
- Altitude: 2,635 m (8,645 ft)
- Diameter: 2.65 m (8 ft 8 in)
- Secondary diameter: 0.938 m (3 ft 0.9 in)
- Focal length: 14.416 m (47 ft 3.6 in)
- Website: vstportal.oacn.inaf.it
- Location of VLT Survey Telescope
- Related media on Commons

The VLT Survey Telescope (VST) is a telescope located at ESO's Paranal Observatory in the Atacama Desert of northern Chile. It is housed in an enclosure immediately adjacent to the four Very Large Telescope (VLT) Unit Telescopes on the summit of Cerro Paranal. The VST is a wide-field survey telescope with a field of view twice as broad as the full Moon. It is the largest telescope in the world designed to exclusively survey the sky in visible light.

The VST program is a cooperation between the Osservatorio Astronomico di Capodimonte (OAC), Naples, Italy, and the European Southern Observatory (ESO) that began in 1997. The OAC is one of the institute members of Istituto Nazionale di AstroFisica (INAF), which created a separate institute for the coordination of both technological and scientific aspects of the project, named Centro VST a Napoli (VSTceN). VSTcen was founded and directed by Prof. Massimo Capaccioli of the VST project, and hosted at the OAC. ESO and VSTceN collaborated in the commission phase, while ESO was responsible for the civil engineering works and the dome on site. The telescope has now started observations and ESO is solely responsible for managing its operations and maintenance.

== Technical information ==
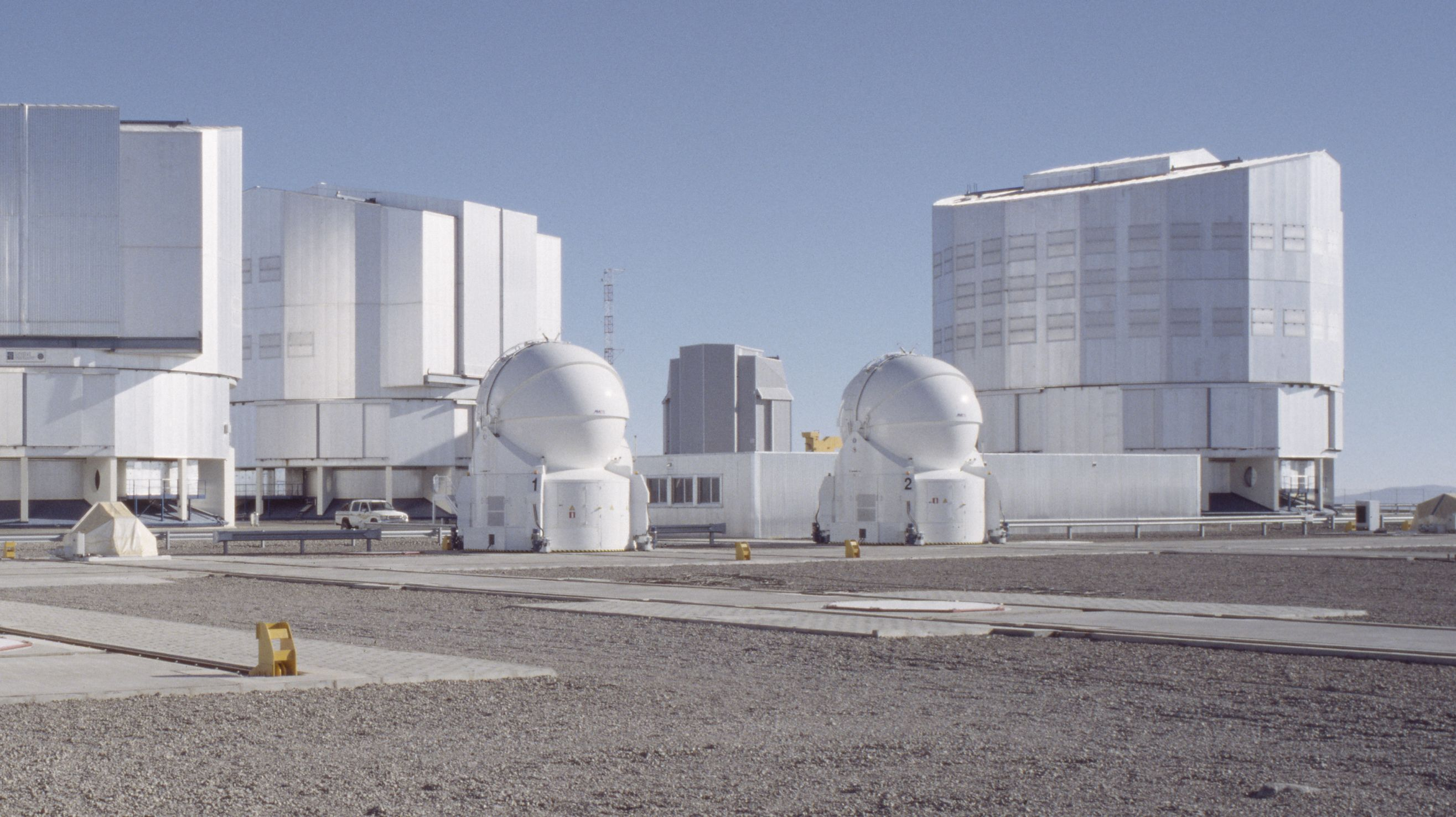
The VST dome among VLT's telescopes. It is located in the background between two of the VLT auxiliary telescopes (small round enclosures).

The VST is an alt-azimuthal wide-field survey telescope with a primary mirror diameter of 2.65 meters that was constructed from 2007 to 2011 at the ESO Cerro Paranal Observatory, in Chile. With a field of view of one square degree (roughly two full moons), its main scientific role is as a wide-field imaging instrument for exploring the large-scale structure of the universe (as visible from the southern hemisphere), able to identify the most suitable candidates for detailed examination by the VLT. Together with its camera OmegaCAM, the VST is able to obtain a high angular resolution (0.216 arcsec/pixel), and it is capable of performing stand-alone survey projects in the visible part of the spectrum.

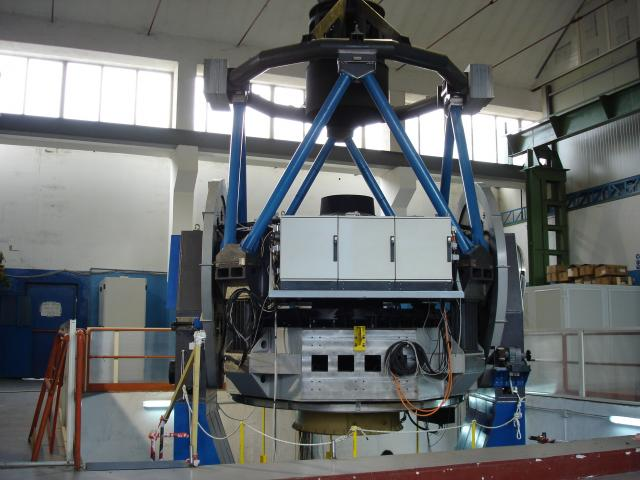
The VST at the integration site in Italy

=== Telescope optics ===
The telescope has two mirrors, the primary (M1) and a smaller secondary mirror (M2), which reflect light from the sky down to the OmegaCAM camera. Both mirrors are made from a crystalline ceramic material called Sitall, chosen for its low coefficient of thermal expansion. The VST primary mirror is the larger of the two, with a diameter of 265 cm and a thickness of 14 cm. The secondary mirror is less than half the size of M1 with a diameter of just 93.8 cm and a thickness of 13 cm. VST's original optical components were manufactured at the Lytkarino Glass Factory, Moscow. The mirrors were completed ahead of schedule, but on arrival in Chile in 2002, the primary was found to be broken and the secondary was damaged. The new primary and repaired secondary arrived in Chile in 2006.

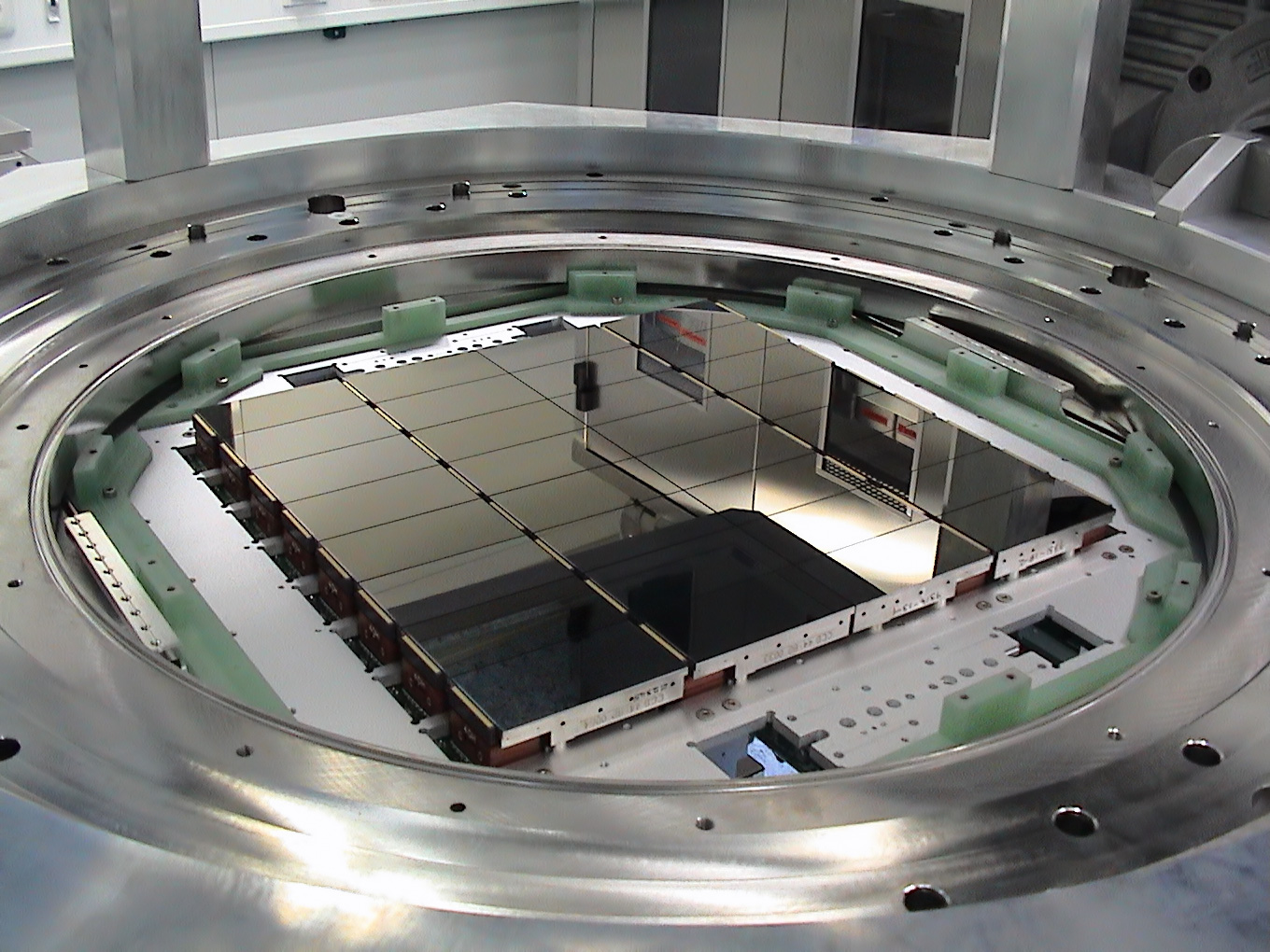
The OmegaCAM camera lies at the heart of the VST. This view shows its 32 CCD detectors that together create 268-megapixel images.

A computer-controlled active optics system controls the shape of M1 and the position of M2. This technology preserves the optical image quality by keeping the mirrors optimally positioned at all times. M1 is continuously reshaped by an actuator network of 84 axial motors distributed under the mirror surface and 24 radial dislocated laterally. Also in the primary mirror cell is another instrument able to modify the telescope's optical configuration by moving from a corrector composed by a double set of lenses, to an atmospheric dispersion corrector (ADC) composed of a counter-rotating set of prisms, able to correct the optical dispersion phenomena due to the variation of air mass induced by changing the altitude angle. The secondary mirror is actively controlled by a deformable platform able to tilt the mirror during exposure. The active optics system also includes a Shack–Hartmann wavefront sensor, mounted under the primary mirror cell together with the local guide system, able to furnish the optical correction feedback. These systems give the VST the capability to be autonomous in terms of guiding, tracking and active optics control.

=== OmegaCAM ===
At its Cassegrain focus, the VST hosts an imaging wide-field camera (OmegaCAM), comprising a mosaic of 32 2Kx4K CCDs (268 megapixels total), and produced by an international consortium between the Netherlands, Germany, Italy, and the ESO. Design features of OmegaCAM include four auxiliary CCD cameras, two for auto-guiding and two for on-line image analysis. Up to 12 filters can be used, ranging from ultraviolet to near-infrared. The entire detector system operates in vacuum at about −140 degrees Celsius behind a large dewar window. This window not only protects the detectors from air and moisture, but also acts as an additional corrector lens.

== VST surveys ==
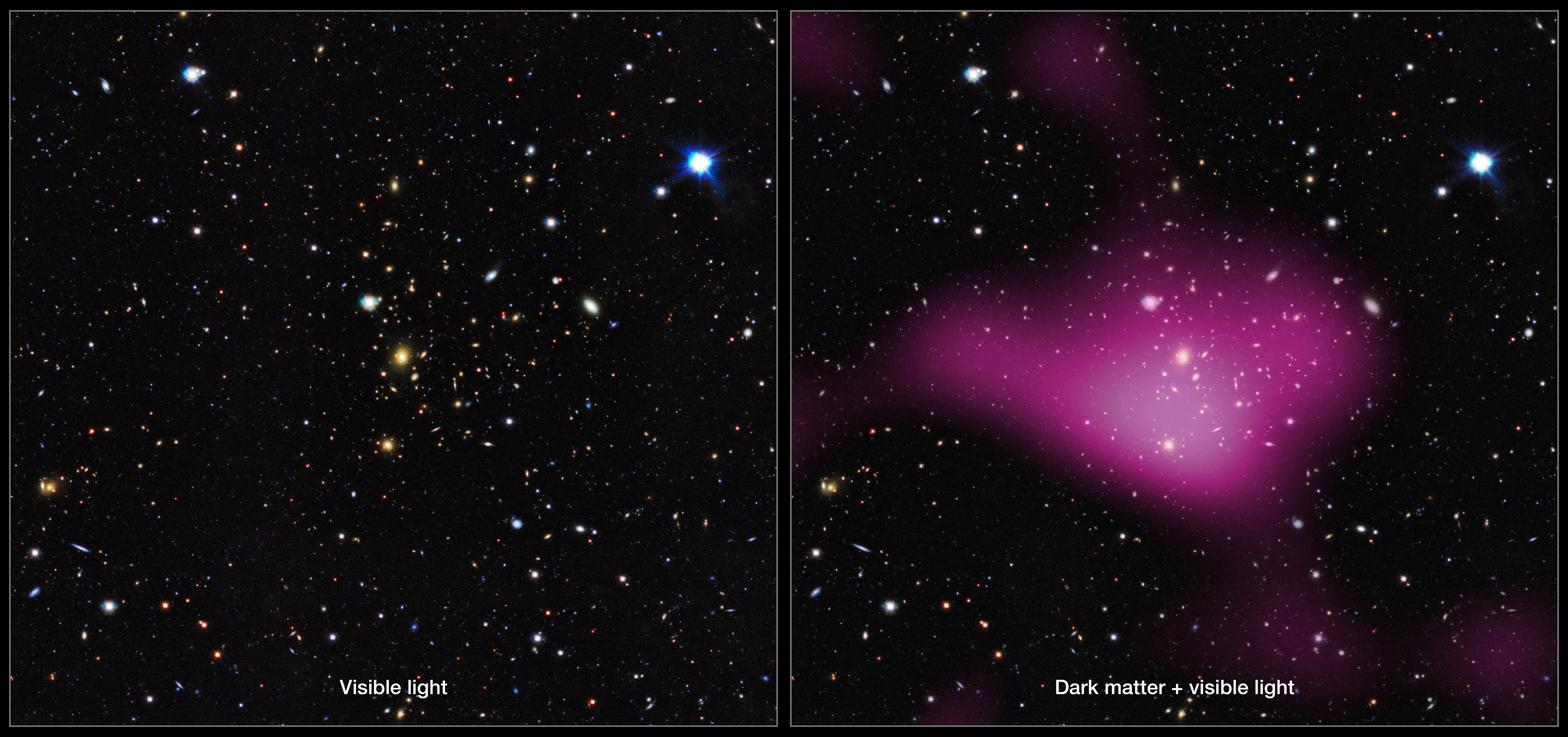
First results from the KiDS Survey

The primary function of the VST is to support the Very Large Telescope by providing surveys – both extensive, multi-colour imaging surveys and more specific searches for rare astronomical objects. Three started in October 2011 as part of the Public Surveys Project, and they are anticipated to take five years to carry out. These are the Kilo-Degree Survey (KiDS), VST ATLAS and the VST Photometric Hα Survey of the Southern Galactic Plane (VPHAS+). They focus on a wide range of astronomical issues from searching for highly energetic quasars to understanding the nature of dark energy. More information about the surveys can be found on the ESO - The VST Surveys website.

The Orion Nebula and cluster from the VLT Survey Telescope

The data volume produced by OmegaCAM is large. About 30 terabytes of raw data will be produced per year and will flow back into data centres in Europe for processing. A novel and sophisticated software system has been developed at Groningen and Naples to handle the very large data flow. The end products from the processing will be huge lists of the objects found, as well as images, and these will be made available to astronomers worldwide for scientific analysis. Funding for the data analysis was uncertain in 2011.

== Construction ==
The loss of the first mirror in 2002 while being transported from Europe to Chile caused delays in the construction of the telescope. The new primary and repaired secondary were completed in 2006. Testing was finished in Italy and the telescope was dismounted, painted and packed, then shipped and mounted at Paranal. The first parts arrived in June 2007, and the first phase of integration at Paranal was completed in April, 2008. The mirrors were stored while their cells were constructed; further delays occurred when the primary mirror cell suffered water damage while in transit to Chile, requiring it to be returned to Europe for repair. The first images from the VST were released on June 8, 2011.

== Science ==
Globular star cluster Omega Centauri as seen by the VST

In planetary science, the survey telescope aims to discover and study remote Solar System bodies such as trans-Neptunian objects, as well as search for extrasolar planet transits. The Galactic plane will also be extensively studied with VST, which will look for signatures of tidal interactions in the Milky Way, and will provide astronomers with data crucial to understand the structure and evolution of our Galaxy. Further afield, the VST will explore nearby galaxies, extragalactic and intra-cluster planetary nebulae, and will perform surveys of faint object and micro-lensing events. The telescope will also peer into the distant Universe to help astronomers find answers to long-standing questions in cosmology. It will target medium-redshift supernovae to help pin down the cosmic distance scale and understand the expansion of the Universe. The VST will also look for cosmic structures at medium-high redshift, active galactic nuclei and quasars to further our understanding of galaxy formation and the Universe's early history.

VST's view of the Leo Triplet and beyond

Through the VST ATLAS survey, the telescope will target one of the most fundamental questions in astrophysics today: the nature of dark energy. The survey aims to detect small-amplitude oscillations known as ´baryon wiggles’ that can be detected in the power-spectrum of galaxies and are the imprint of sound waves in the early Universe on the distribution of matter. The dark energy equation of state can be determined by measuring the features of these oscillations. Extrapolating from previous surveys, it is very likely that the VST will make some unexpected discoveries with major consequences for the current understanding of the Universe.

== First images ==
Carina Nebula picture taken with the help of Sebastián Piñera, President of Chile

The first released VST image (below on the right) shows the star-forming region Messier 17, also known as the Omega Nebula or the Swan Nebula, as it has never been seen before. This vast region of gas, dust and hot young stars lies in the heart of the Milky Way in the constellation of Sagittarius (The Archer). The VST field of view is so large that the entire nebula, including its fainter outer parts, is captured—and retains its superb sharpness across the entire image. The data were processed using the Astro-WISE software system developed by E.A. Valentijn and collaborators at Groningen and elsewhere.

The second released VST image (top on the right) may be the best portrait of the globular star cluster Omega Centauri ever made. Omega Centauri, in the constellation of Centaurus (The Centaur), is the largest globular cluster in the sky, but the very wide field of view of VST and its powerful camera OmegaCAM can encompass even the faint outer regions of this object. The view seen on the left includes about 300 000 stars. The data were processed using the VST-Tube system developed by A. Grado and collaborators at the INAF-Capodimonte Observatory.

The third released VST image (middle on the right) shows a triplet of bright galaxies in the constellation of Leo (The Lion), together with a multitude of fainter objects: distant background galaxies and much closer Milky Way stars. The image hints at the power of the VST and OmegaCAM for surveying the extragalactic Universe and for mapping the low brightness objects of the galactic halo. The image on the left is a composite created by combining exposures taken through three different filters. Light that passed through a near-infrared filter was coloured red, red light is coloured green, and green light is coloured magenta.

== See also ==
- European Southern Observatory
- Large Synoptic Survey Telescope
- List of largest optical reflecting telescopes
- Very Large Telescope
- VISTA (telescope)
