= COSMOSOMAS =

Astronomical experiment

COSMOlogical Structures On Medium Angular Scales
- Alternative names: COSMOSOMAS
- Part of: Teide Observatory
- Location(s): Spain
- Coordinates: 28°18′03″N 16°30′36″W
- Organization: Instituto de Astrofísica de Canarias
- Wavelength: 12.7, 14.7, 16.3 GHz (2.36, 2.04, 1.84 cm)
- First light: 1998
- Decommissioned: 2007
- Diameter: 2.5 m (8 ft 2 in)
- Secondary diameter: 1.8 m (5 ft 11 in)
- Website: www.iac.es/proyecto/cmb/pages/en/former-cmb-experiments/cosmosomas.php
- Location within Canary Islands

COSMOSOMAS is a circular scanning astronomical microwave experiment to investigate the Cosmic Microwave Background anisotropy and diffuse emission from the Galaxy on angular scales from 1 to 5 degrees. It was designed and built by the Instituto de Astrofísica de Canarias (IAC) in Tenerife, Spain, in 1998. Its name comes from "COSMOlogical Structures On Medium Angular Scales" referring to CMB fluctuations. This experiment grew out experience of the previous Tenerife Experiment with the need to go to smaller angular scales with greater sensitivity.

The experiment consists of two instruments, COSMO15 (three channels at 12.7, 14.7 and 16.3 GHz) and COSMO11 (two hands of linear polarization at 10.9 GHz). Both instruments are based on a circular scanning sky strategy, consisting of a 60 rpm spinning flat mirror directing the sky radiation into an off-axis paraboloidal antenna, whose size is 1.8-m in the COSMO15 and 2.4-m in the COSMO11. These antennas focus the radiation on to cryogenically cooled HEMT-based receivers, both at an operating temperature of 20K (-253 C) and in the frequency range of 10–12 GHz for COSMO11, and 12–18 GHz for COSMO15. In the COSMO15 instrument, the signal is split by a set of three filters, allowing simultaneous observations at 13, 15 and 17 GHz. Thus, four 1-degree resolution sky maps complete in right ascension and covering 20 degrees in declination are obtained every day at these frequencies.

The most important result to come from this experiment is the cleanest detection of "spinning dust" in the Perseus molecular cloud. These are very small dust grains which can spin thousands of million times a second. If they have an asymmetrical electrical charge they can radiate like a lot of tiny dipole antennas. This cloud is very bright at infra-red wavelengths due to thermal emission from the large dust grains, but very little emission would be expected at microwave wavelengths by this type of dust. Instead there is a broad bump of signal centered on 22 GHz, a factor of 50 above the expected level of signal.
