= GroundBIRD =

Astronomical experiment

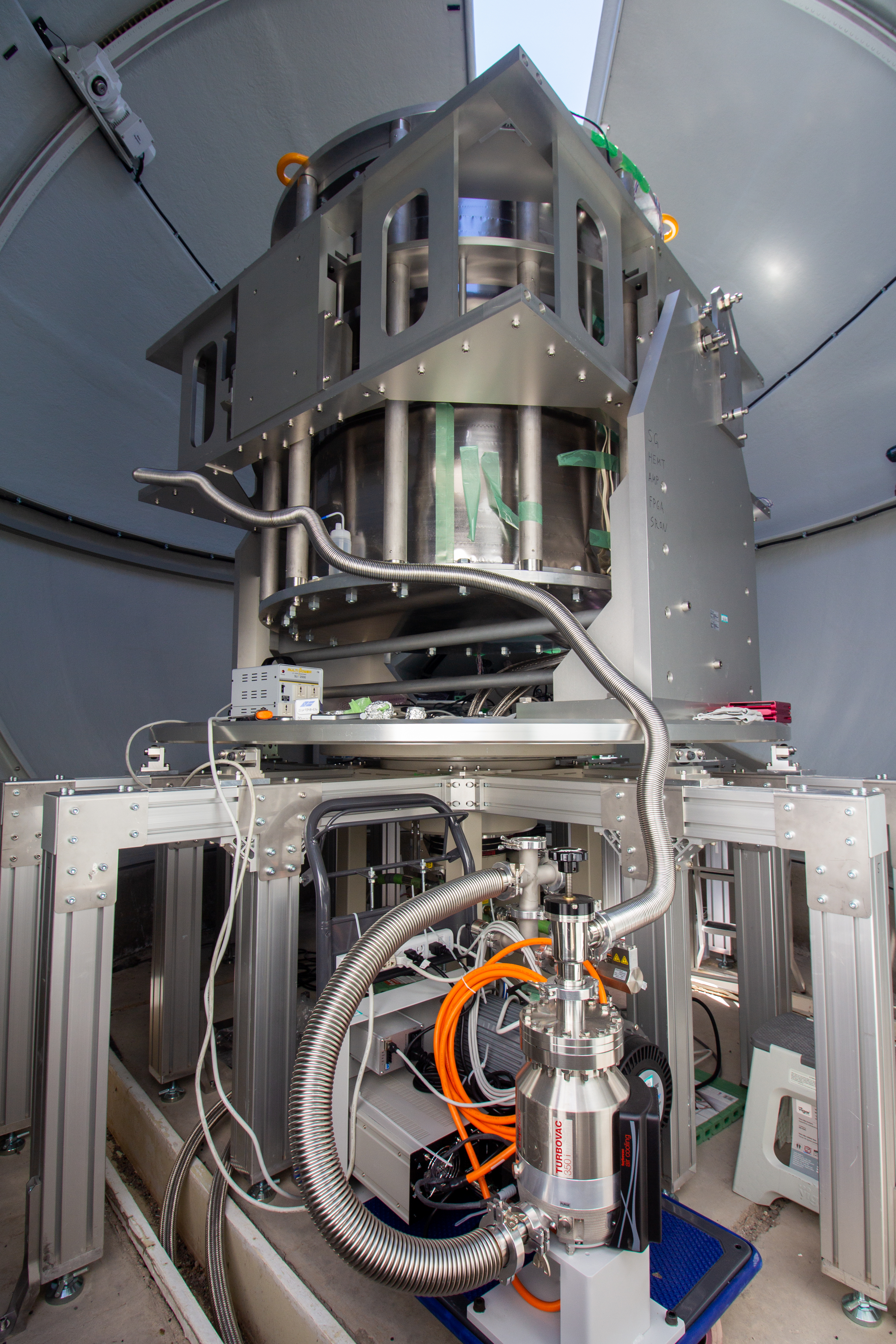
- GroundBIRD in 2019
- Location(s): Tenerife, Atlantic Ocean, international waters
- Coordinates: 28°18′02″N 16°30′37″W
- Altitude: 2,400 m (7,900 ft)
- Wavelength: 145, 220 GHz (2.07, 1.36 mm)
- Telescope style: cosmic microwave background experiment
- Diameter: 30 cm (1 ft 0 in)
- Angular resolution: 0.5 degree, 0.3 degree
- Location within Tenerife
- Related media on Commons

GroundBIRD is an experiment to observe the cosmic microwave background at 145 and 220GHz. It aims to observe the B-mode polarisation signal from inflation in the early universe. It is located at Teide Observatory, on the island of Tenerife in the Canary Islands.

== Scientific goals ==
The telescope was constructed to measure the B-mode signal in the polarisation of the Cosmic Microwave Background (CMB), in order to look for evidence of cosmic inflation in the early universe. It aims to observe the reionization bump at $l<20$ and the recombination peak around $l=200$. The name 'GroundBIRD' indicates that the telescope is ground-based, while BIRD stands for B-mode Imaging Radiation Detector. It is related to the future, similarly-named, LiteBIRD CMB satellite.

== Telescope ==
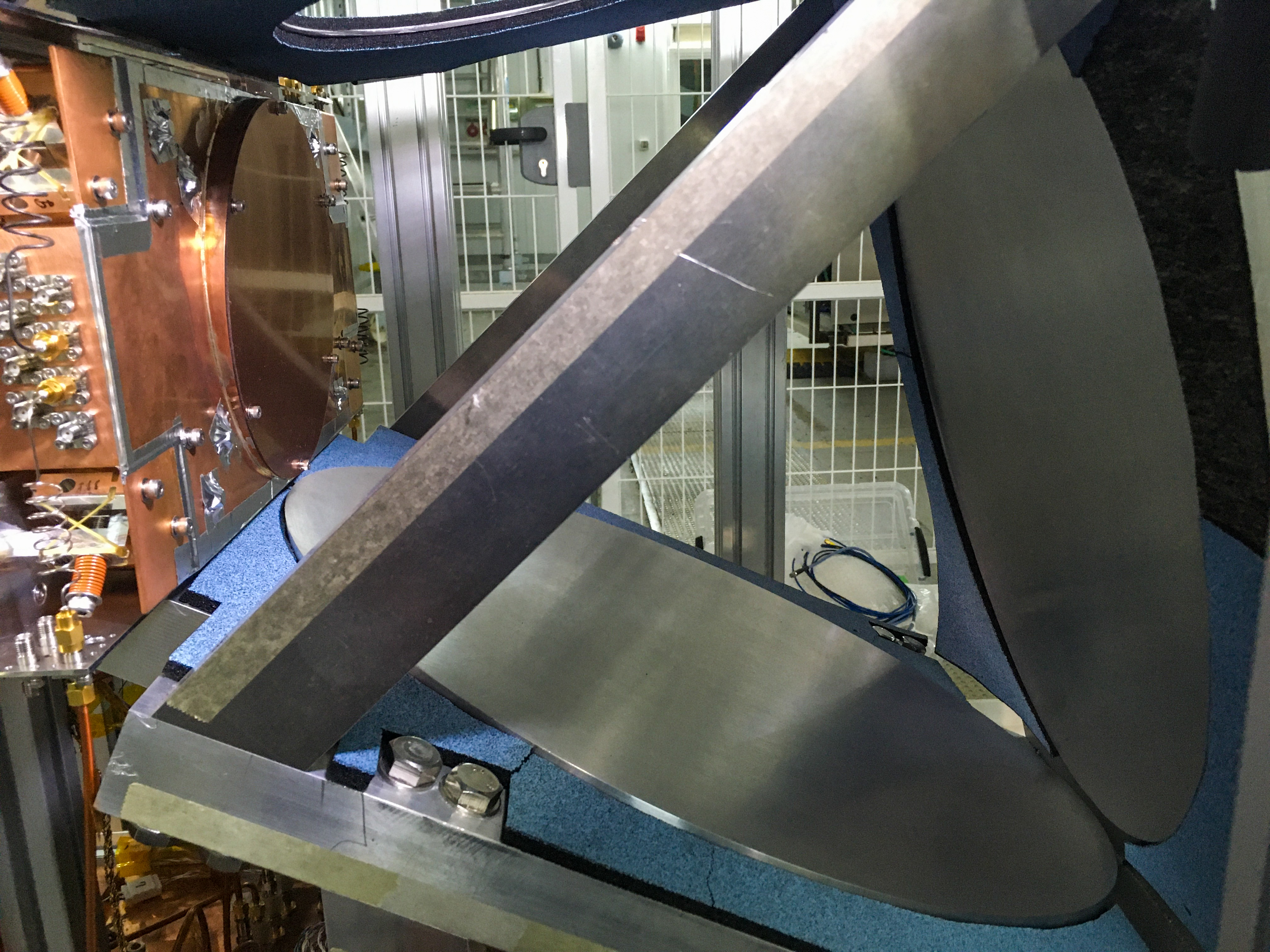
The detector focal plane (left) along with the primary (bottom) and secondary (right) mirrors, which are all located in the cryostat.

The telescope consists of two mirrors in a Mizuguchi-Dragone configuration, with a diameter of 30 cm (12 in). The telescope is inside the cryostat, which is mounted on a rotation table, with a rotary joint that provides helium gas and electricity to the cryostat. The mirrors are cooled to 4 K (−269.15 °C) using a Pulse tube refrigerator to reduce the thermal noise from the mirror surfaces.

The experiment uses microwave kinetic inductance detectors (MKIDs), which are cooled to 250mK by a sorption cooler within the cryostat, which uses helium-3, and was manufactured by Chase Research Cryogenics Ltd. The signals from the detector are multiplexed, and around 100 detectors can be measured in both phase and amplitude with a single digital read-out system with a bandwidth of 200MHz, recording 1,000 samples per second. The digital system uses 12-bit ADCs and a Kintex-7 FPGA from Xilinx initially, and now uses Kintex ultrascale FPGAs. Raspberry Pis are used to monitor and control the telescope.

The cryostat rotates at 20 rpm (120° per second, 1 rotation every 3 seconds) to minimize 1/f noise. It observes at zenith angles up to 20°, mapping around 40% of the sky. The field of view is 10°, with an angular resolution of 0.5° FWHM at 145GHz, and 0.3° at 220GHz. It will measure the CMB at $6<l<300$

The telescope was constructed at KEK in Japan. Test observations started in Japan in 2014. While it was originally intended that it would observe from the Atacama Desert in Chile, an agreement to install it at Teide Observatory was reached in 2016, at an altitude of 2,400 metres (7,900 ft). It was shipped to Tenerife in January 2019. In February 2020, the experiment was visited by Kenji Hiramatsu, the Japanese Ambassador to Spain.

== Collaboration ==
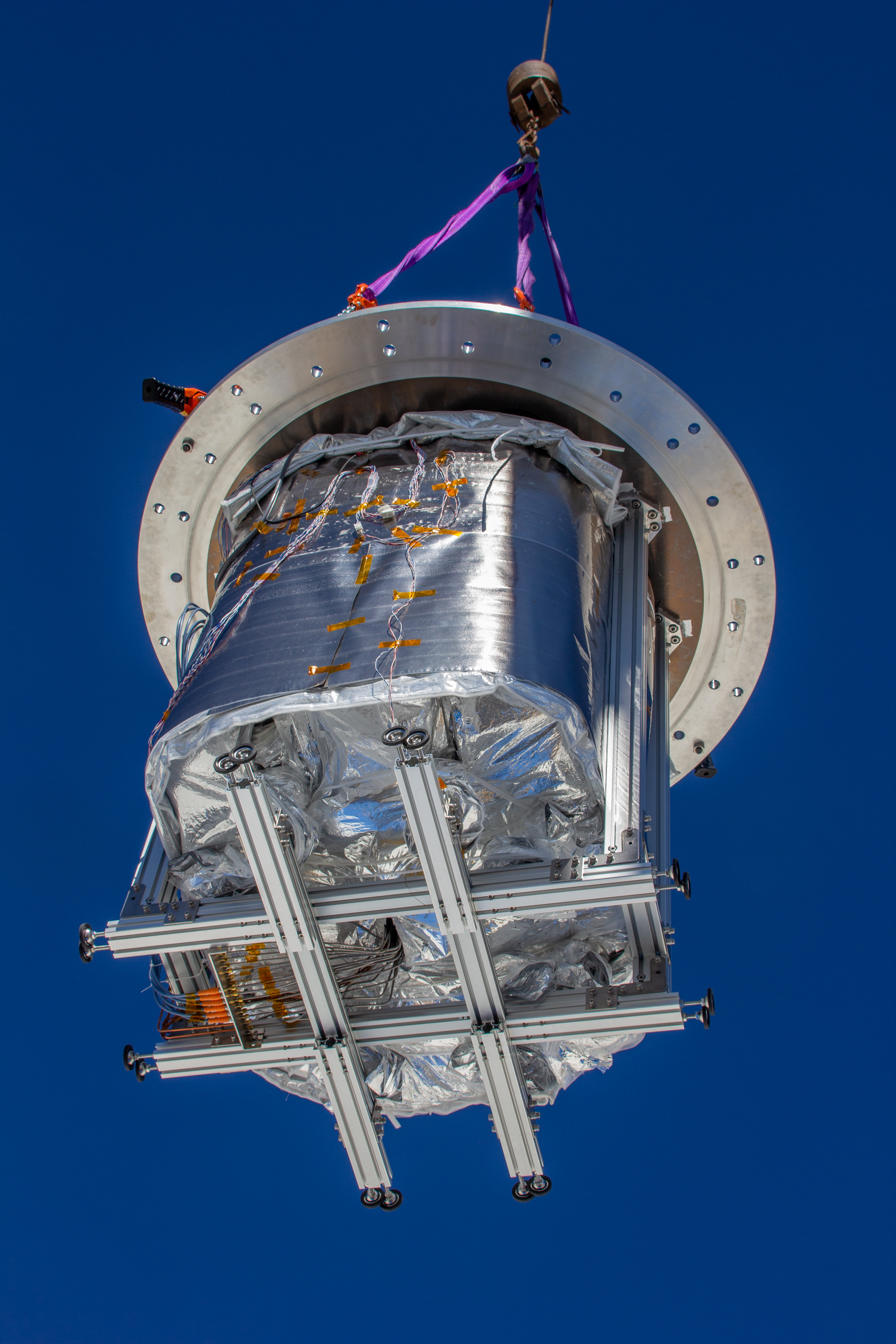
The inside of the cryostat being lifted into the telescope dome.

The collaboration includes scientists from:

- Delft University of Technology, Netherlands
- The Graduate University for Advanced Studies, Japan
- Korea Astronomy and Space Science Institute, Korea
- Instituto de Astrofísica de Canarias, Canary Islands, Spain
- KEK, Japan
- Korea University, Korea
- Kyoto University, Japan
- National Astronomical Observatory of Japan, Japan
- RIKEN, Japan
- Saitama University, Japan
- Tohoku University, Japan
- University of Tokyo, Japan

== Funding ==
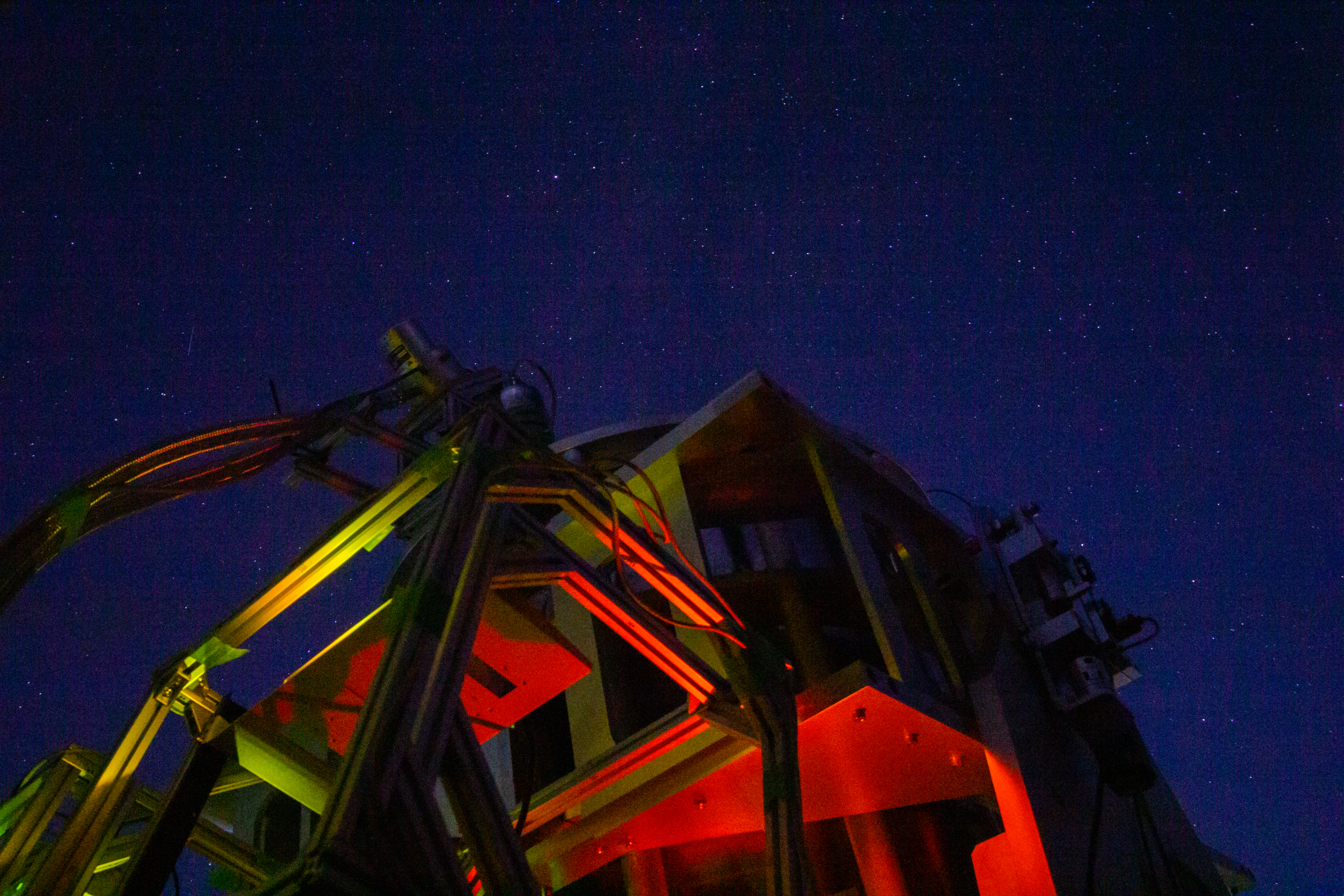
GroundBIRD observing the night sky

The project is funded by:

- Ministry of Education, Culture, Sports, Science and Technology, Japan
- The Graduate University for Advanced Studies, Japan
- National Astronomical Observatory of Japan, Japan
- National Research Foundation of Korea, Korea

with additional support from:

- OpenIt, Japan
