= Teide 1 =

Brown dwarf in the constellation Taurus

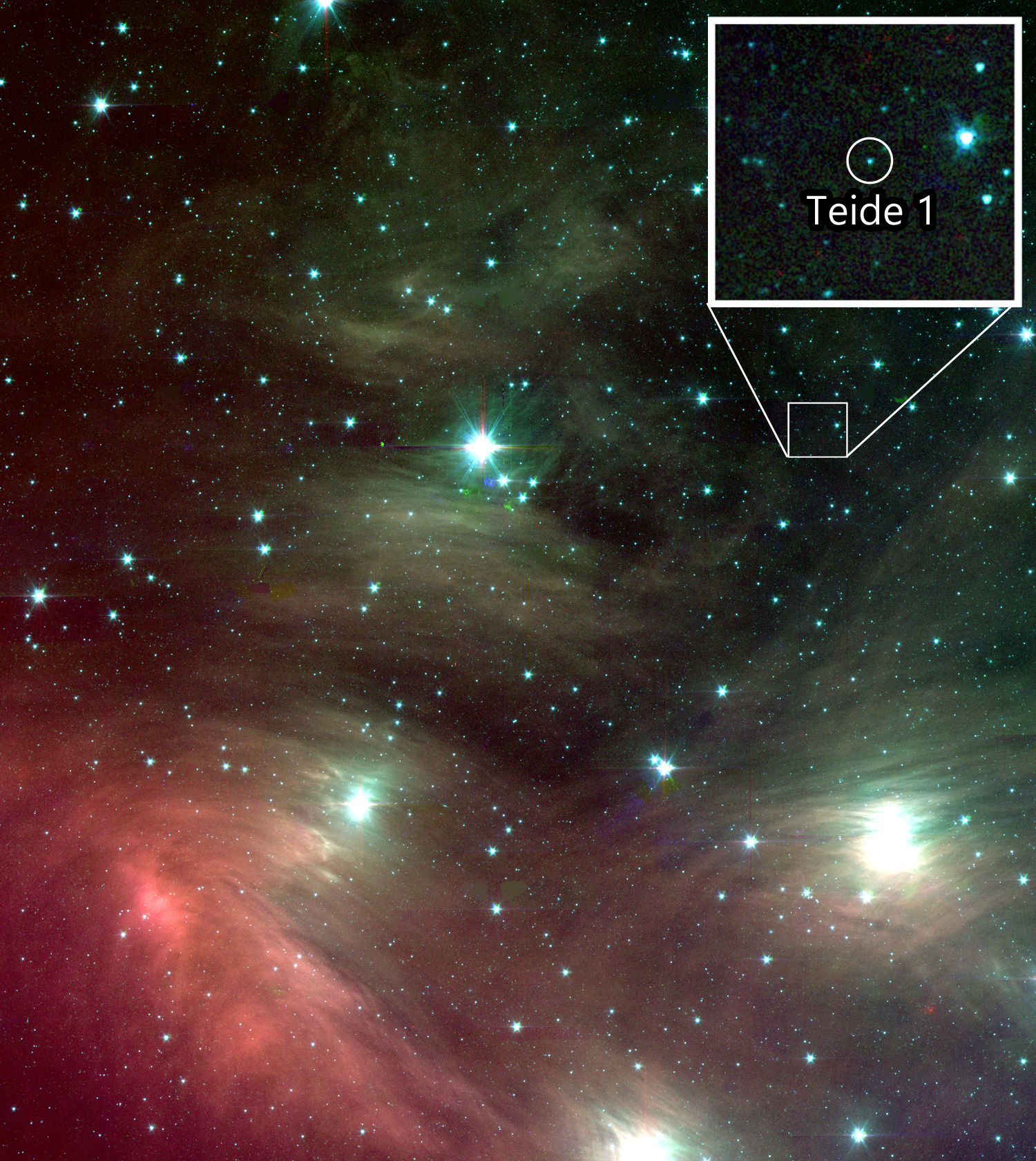
- Teide 1 in the Pleiades as seen in infrared by the Spitzer Space Telescope

Observation data Epoch J2000 Equinox ICRS
- Constellation: Taurus
- Right ascension: 03^{h} 47^{m} 17.915^{s}
- Declination: +24° 22′ 31.75″

Characteristics
- Spectral type: M8.8
- Apparent magnitude (J): 16.215±0.010
- Apparent magnitude (H): 15.591±0.009
- Apparent magnitude (K): 15.096±0.011

Astrometry
Proper motion (μ)	RA: 21.681±2.695 mas/yr Dec.: −43.254±1.485 mas/yr
Parallax (π)	7.5777±1.7015 mas
Distance	approx. 430 ly (approx. 130 pc)

Details (Note: Parameters taken from Table 6. The parameters in other tables derived from atmospheric modeling are unreliable, as discussed in the text.)
Mass	52+15 −10 M_{Jup}
Radius	1.311+0.12 −0.075 R_{Jup}
Luminosity	0.0006 L_{☉}
Surface gravity (log g)	4.871+0.037 −0.043 cgs
Temperature	2584±100 K
Age	112±5 Myr

Other designations
- Melotte 22 Teide 1, Melotte 22 BPL 137, Melotte 22 NPL 39, EPIC 211088076, 2MASS J03471792+2422317

Database references
SIMBAD	data

Teide 1 is a brown dwarf located around 430 light years away in the Pleiades. It was the first brown dwarf to be confirmed. Its surface temperature is 2,600 ± 150 K, which is about half that of the Sun. Its luminosity is 0.08–0.05% of that of the Sun. It is estimated to have about the same age as Pleiades, giving a plausible range from 70 to 140 Myr.

== Discovery ==
Teide 1 was detected by Rafael Rebolo López, María R. Zapatero-Osorio and Eduardo L. Martín in optical images obtained in January 1994 with the 0.80 meter diameter telescope (IAC-80) from the Instituto de Astrofísica de Canarias, located at the Teide Observatory on the island of Tenerife. Its cold nature was confirmed in December 1994 with the William Herschel telescope (WHT) of the Roque de los Muchachos observatory in La Palma. On May 22, 1995, the article reporting their discovery was submitted to the journal Nature, which published it on September 14, 1995. Meanwhile, a similar object, Calar 3, was discovered. The brown dwarf nature of Teide 1 and Calar 3 was independently confirmed in 1996 following spectroscopic observations with the 10-meter diameter telescope of the W. M. Keck observatory of Mauna Kea on the island of Hawaii.

== Gallery ==
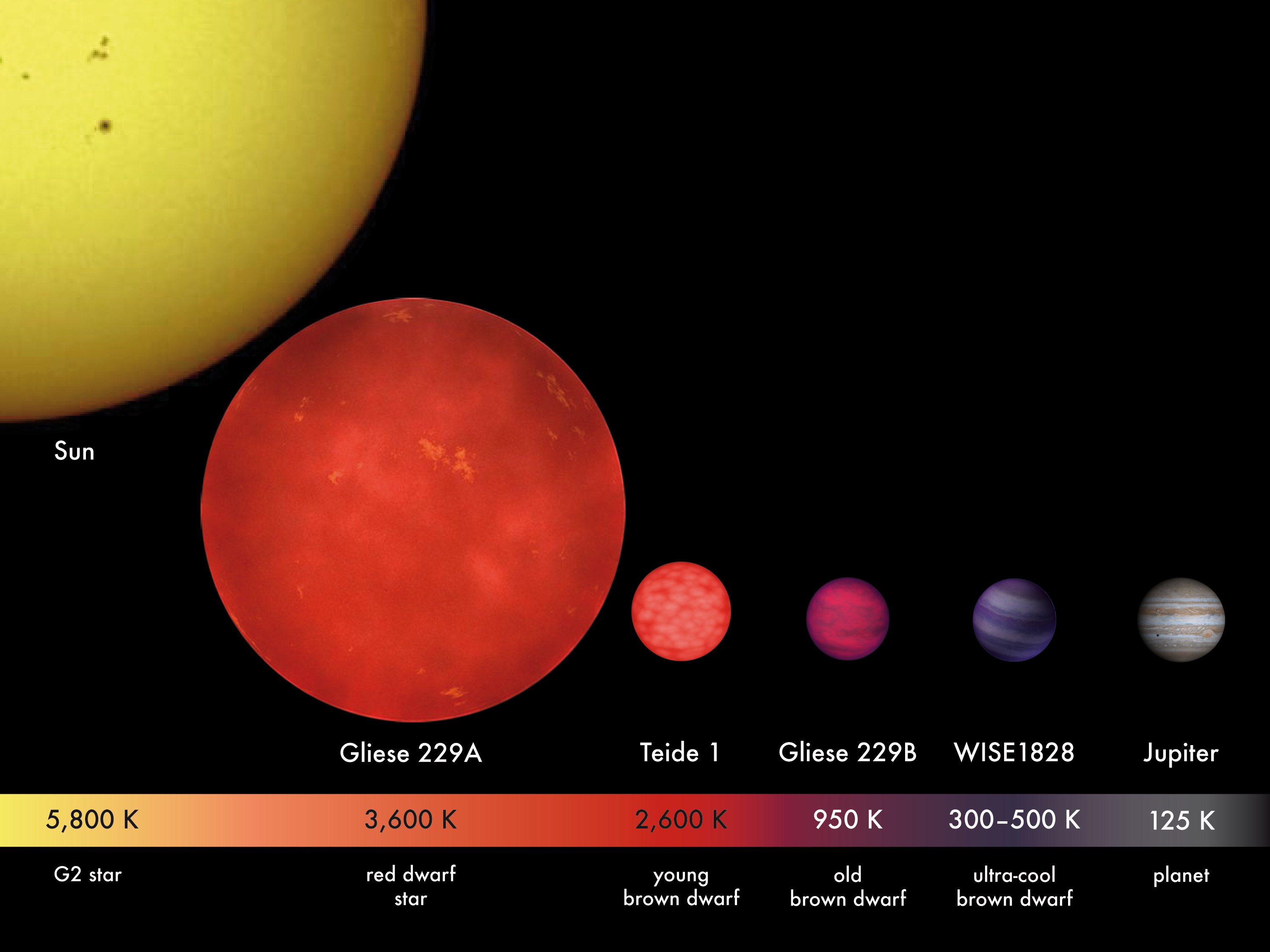
Estimated relative size of the planet Jupiter and the brown dwarfs WISE 1828+2650, Gliese 229B, and Teide 1 compared to the Sun and a red dwarf. Credit: MPIA/V. Joergens.
