= Leibniz Institute for Solar Physics =

German research institute

Coordinates: 47°59′54″N 7°51′41″E

Institute for Solar Physics (KIS)
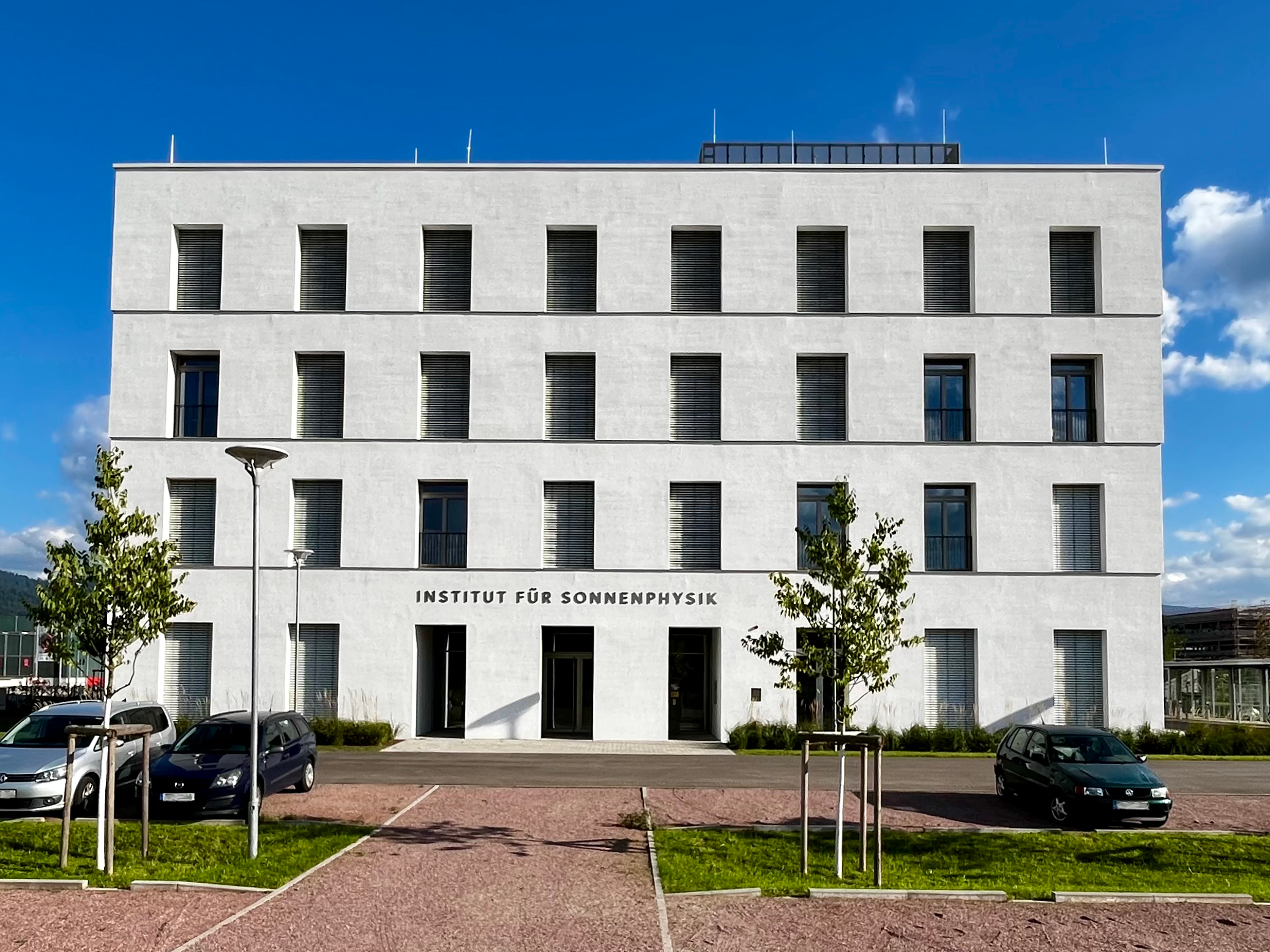
- Abbreviation: KIS
- Formation: 1943: founded by Karl-Otto Kiepenheuer / 1978: renamed to Kiepenheuer Institute for Solar Physics / 2018: renamed to Leibniz Institute for Solar Physics / 2023: renamed to Institute for Solar Physics
- Type: Research Institute
- Location: Freiburg, Germany
- Managing Director: Prof. Dr. Hardi Peter
- Parent organization: Leibniz Association
- Affiliations: Institute for Solar Physics (KIS) / Institut für Sonnenphysik (KIS)
- Website: www.leibniz-kis.de/en/home/

The Institute for Solar Physics (aka: KIS; German: Institut für Sonnenphysik), from 2018 to 2023, the institute's name was Leibniz Institute for Solar Physics, formerly known as Kiepenheuer Institute for Solar Physics and thus abbreviated KIS) is a non-university research institute located in Freiburg, Germany.

The institute conducts application-oriented basic research in the fields of astronomy, astrophysics and solar physics.

In July 2023, the Leibniz Association Senate recommended that the federal and state governments end joint funding of KIS, finding that the institute no longer met the requirements for an institution of supraregional significance. The evaluation found that the institute had failed to develop an overarching research strategy, a deficiency that had already been identified at the previous evaluation seven years earlier. Scientific Advisory Committee recommendations had repeatedly gone unimplemented across two evaluation cycles, and the supervisory board was found to have missed essential strategic decisions. During the evaluation period, both scientific directors left the institute. Scientific staff roughly halved while administrative staff grew, and the number of doctoral students fell from twelve to four. Third-party funding declined steadily throughout the reporting period. KIS lost its Leibniz membership at the end of 2023 and entered a wind-down phase with transitional funding secured until 31 December 2026.

== History ==
The institute was founded in 1943 as the 'Fraunhofer Institute' by Karl-Otto Kiepenheuer. Kiepenheuer was director of the institute from 1943 until his death in 1975. The institute was renamed as the 'Kiepenheuer Institute for Solar Physics' to honour the founder of the institute and to enable the Fraunhofer Society to call their own institutes (the first of which was founded in 1954), 'Fraunhofer Institutes'. Both institutions had been named independently after the physicist Joseph von Fraunhofer, and they had no other connection besides the name. In November 2018, name of the institute was renamed to Leibniz Institute for Solar Physics (KIS – Leibniz-Institut für Sonnenphysik (KIS) – to highlight the institute's membership in the Leibniz Association.

== Organisation ==
The Leibniz Institute for Solar Physics (KIS) is a foundation under public law of the state of Baden-Württemberg and a member of the Leibniz Association. The organs of the Leibniz Institute for Solar Physics (KIS) are the Foundation Council, the Scientific Advisory Council and the board of directors. The institute is divided into two scientific departments: "Solar and Stellar Astrophysics" and "Observatory and Instrumentation." A third administrative-technical department combines the cross-sectional groups of administration and technical service.

== Observatories ==
The Leibniz Institute for Solar Physics operates solar observing facilities for its own research and for the solar community in Germany and other countries. The institute's prime facilities are the German solar telescopes at the Teide Observatory of the Instituto de Astrofísica de Canarias on Tenerife, Spain, with Europe's largest solar telescope GREGOR as well as the Vacuum Tower Telescope. In addition, the institute is involved in a number of modern ground-based and space- and balloon-borne observing facilities such as Daniel K. Inouye Solar Telescope (DKIST), Sunrise balloon-borne Solar Observatory, and Solar Orbiter. These include both instrumentation developments and scientific activities.

From the 1940s to 1980s, the institute operated the Schauinsland Observatory (near Freiburg) as a research facility. It is now exclusively used for teaching and public outreach purposes.

From the 1950s to 1988, the institute operated the Solar Observatory in Anacapri, Capri, Italy. The Coudé refractor became operational in 1966, and from that time the solar telescope on the Schauinsland continued to be used only for testing equipment. For several years, the Capri observatory with its domeless telescope provided observation time to the institute.

In the early 1970s, the institute searched for a suitable place to establish a European solar observatory, and Karl-Otto Kiepenheuer took an active part in this search. Finally the Spanish island of Tenerife was chosen, due its dry weather and stable atmosphere. In 1989, the Vacuum Tower Telescope became operational, with a 70-cm mirror and adaptive optics. The outpost in Capri was closed after the solar observatory at the Teide Observatory became operational. In 2013, GREGOR Solar Telescope, equipped with a 1.5 m primary mirror, started its science operations at the Teide Observatory.
