= Telescopio Carlos Sánchez =

Infrared telescope

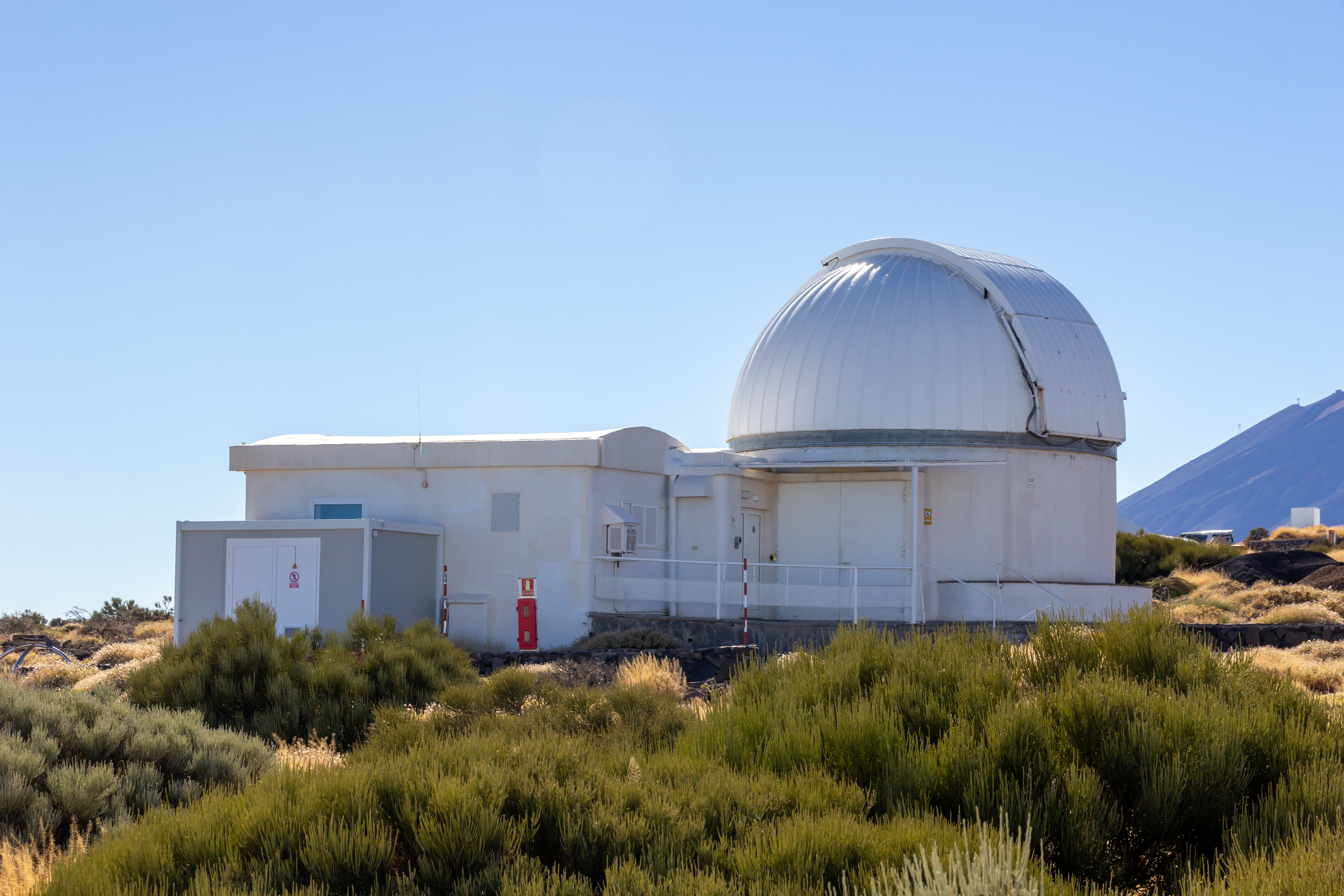
- Alternative names: Telescopio Carlos Sanchez
- Location: Spain
- Coordinates: 28°18′02″N 16°30′39″W
- Diameter: 1.52 m (5 ft 0 in)
- Website: www.iac.es/eno.php?op1=3&op2=6&lang=en&id=5
- Location within Canary Islands
- Related media on Commons

The Telescopio Carlos Sánchez is a 1.52 m Dall-Kirkham type infrared telescope with an equatorial mount and an f/13.8 Cassegrain focus. It is located at Observatorio del Teide on Tenerife, and is operated by the Instituto de Astrofísica de Canarias. It was built in 1971 by the United Kingdom and has been used for a wide range of infrared observational programmes, from large-scale Galactic Centre mapping to stellar oscillations.

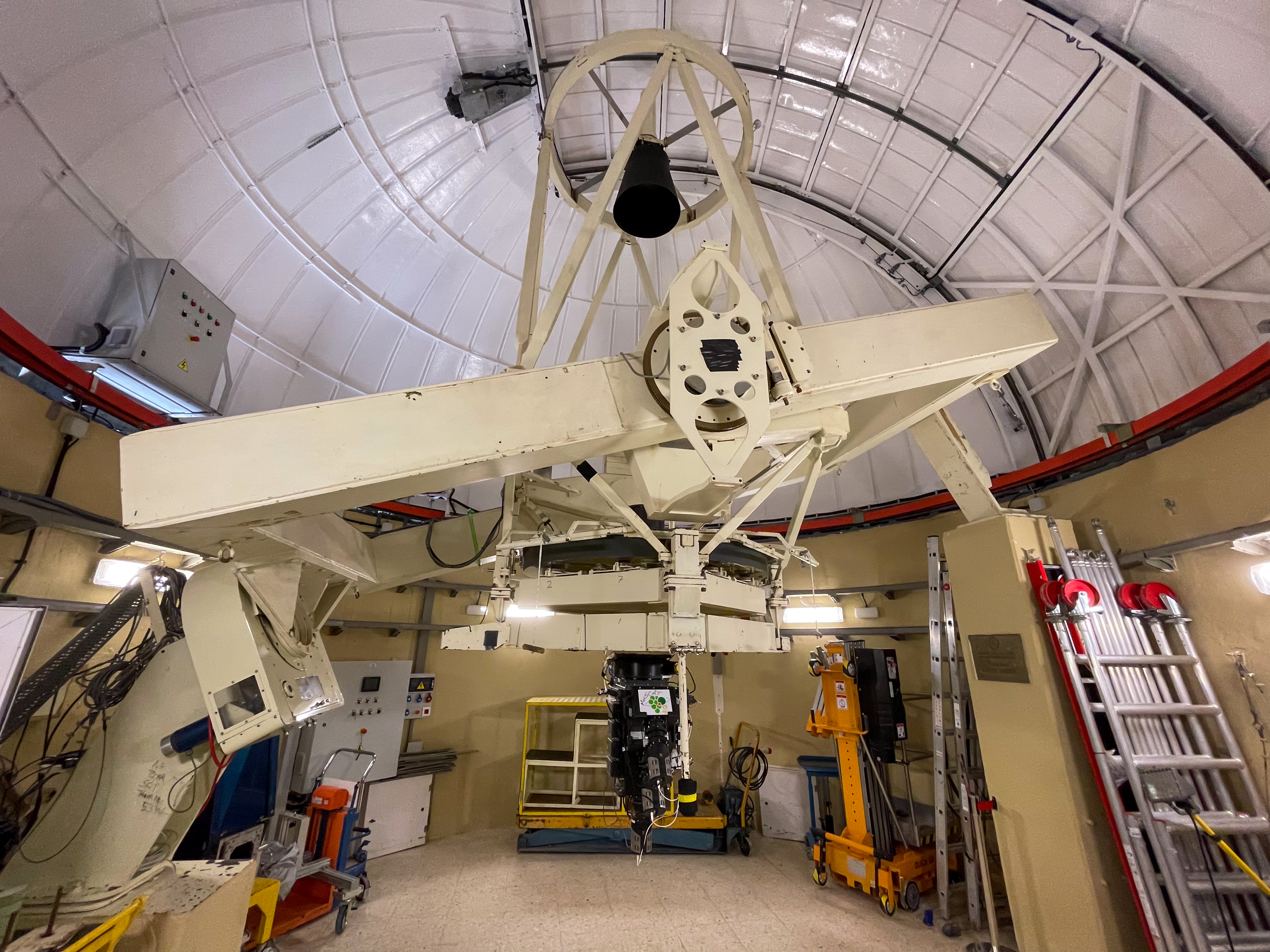
The telescope

The telescope was built by the United Kingdom but was transferred to the Spanish in 1983.

The name of the telescope was adopted in honour of Prof. Carlos Sánchez Magro, Astrophysics Professor at the University of La Laguna.

Since 2018 this telescope has operated the MuSCAT2 instrument, a four color camera. The first light MuSCAT2 was in August 2017, and science operations started in January 2019.

The camera is specially designed to engage in simultaneous capture of an image in four colour bands, " g (400 to 550 nm), r (550 to 700 nm), i (700 to 820 nm), and z_{s} (820 to 920 nm)."

This telescope was originally called the Infrared Flux Collector (IRFC) when it was completed in 1972.

== See also ==
- List of largest optical reflecting telescopes
- List of largest infrared telescopes
- List of largest optical telescopes in the 20th century
