= QUIJOTE Experiment =

Astronomical experiment

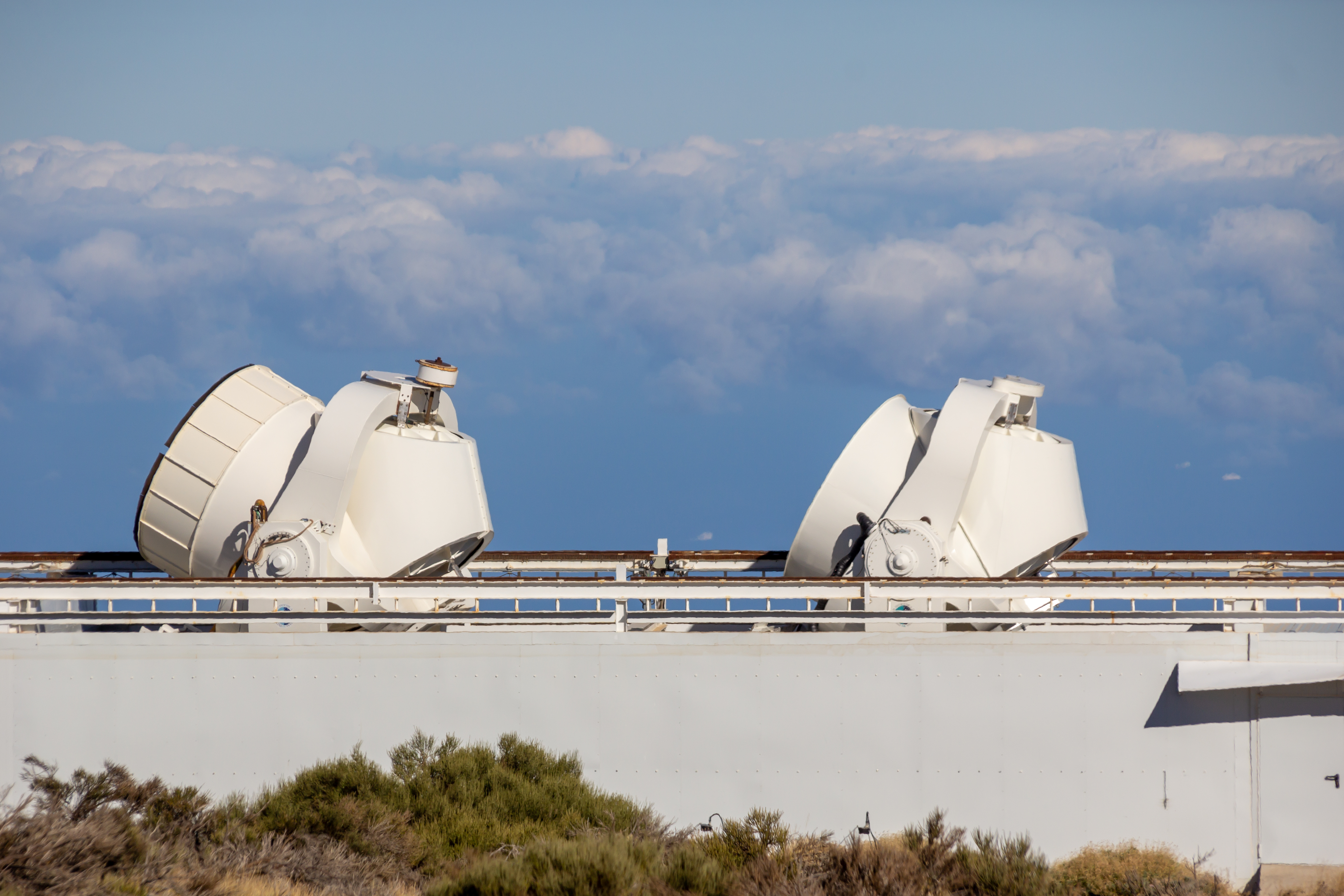
- Alternative names: QUIJOTE CMB Experiment
- Location(s): Tenerife, Atlantic Ocean, international waters
- Coordinates: 28°18′01″N 16°30′36″W
- Wavelength: 11, 13, 17, 19, 31, 41 GHz (2.73, 2.31, 1.76, 1.58, 0.97, 0.73 cm)
- Number of telescopes: 2
- Diameter: 2.25 m (7 ft 5 in)
- Secondary diameter: 1.89 m (6 ft 2 in)
- Website: research.iac.es/proyecto/quijote/pages/en/home.php
- Location within Canary Islands
- Related media on Commons

The QUIJOTE CMB Experiment is an ongoing experiment started in November 2012, and led by Rafael Rebolo López, with the goal of characterizing the polarization of the cosmic microwave background (CMB) and other galactic and extragalactic emission in the frequency range 10 to 40 GHz, at angular scales of 1°. These measurements will complement at low frequency and correct from galactic contamination those obtained by the Planck satellite from 2009 to 2013.

The two QUIJOTE telescopes are placed at the Teide Observatory, run by the Spanish Instituto de Astrofisica de Canarias (IAC). Both telescopes were produced by the IDOM company in Spain.

== Overview ==
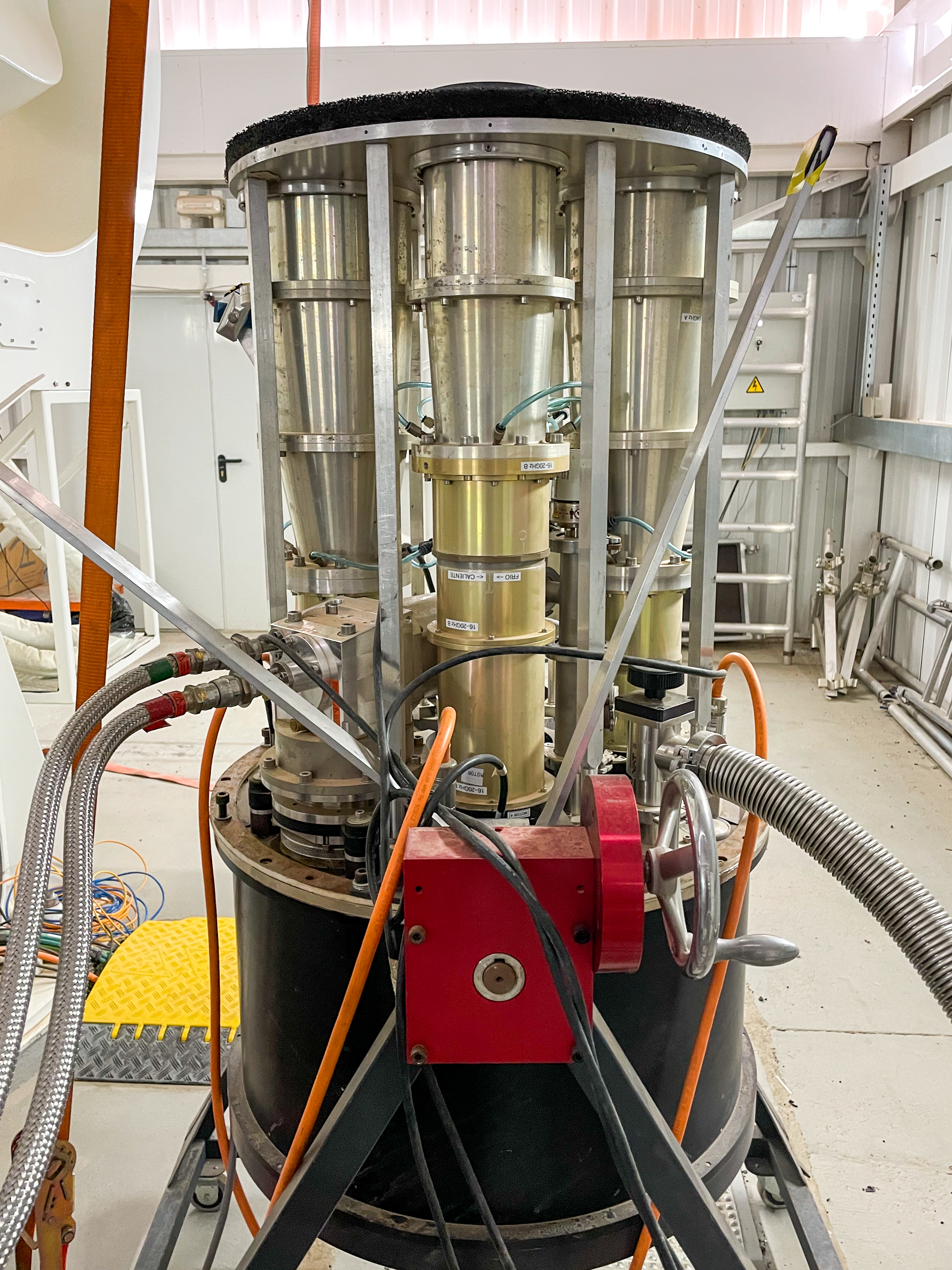
The QUIJOTE MFI instrument

The primordial matter density fluctuations that originated the present structure of the universe left imprinted spatial variations in the CMB radiation. From high sensitivity maps of this radiation, QUIJOTE aims to constrain the most relevant cosmological parameters: total energy/matter density, density of cold dark matter, density of baryonic matter, the Hubble constant, density of dark energy, neutrino density, and the reionization epoch.

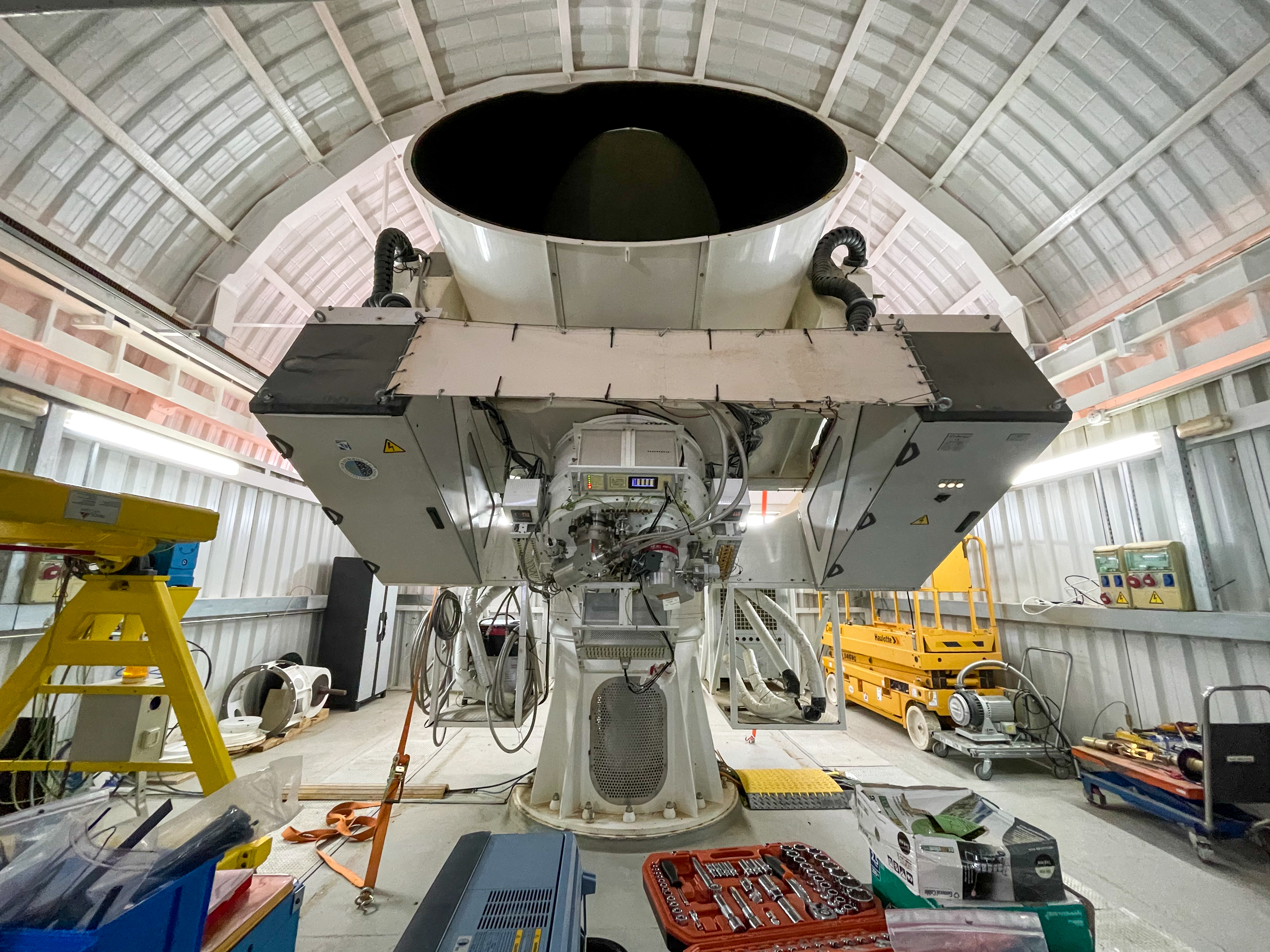
The QUIJOTE TFGI

The first QUIJOTE-CMB telescope (QT1), in operation since November 2012, has two instruments which can be exchanged in the QT1 focal plane. The first instrument (MFI) is a multichannel instrument providing the frequency coverage between 10 and 20 GHz. The second instrument (TGI) consists of 31 polarimeters working at 30 GHz.
The second QUIJOTE-CMB telescope (QT2), in operation since 2014, will house a third instrument (FGI) with 31 polarimeters working at 40 GHz.

== See also ==
- Planck (spacecraft)
- WMAP probe
