= Irene González Hernández =

Spanish researcher and astrophysicist (1969–2014)

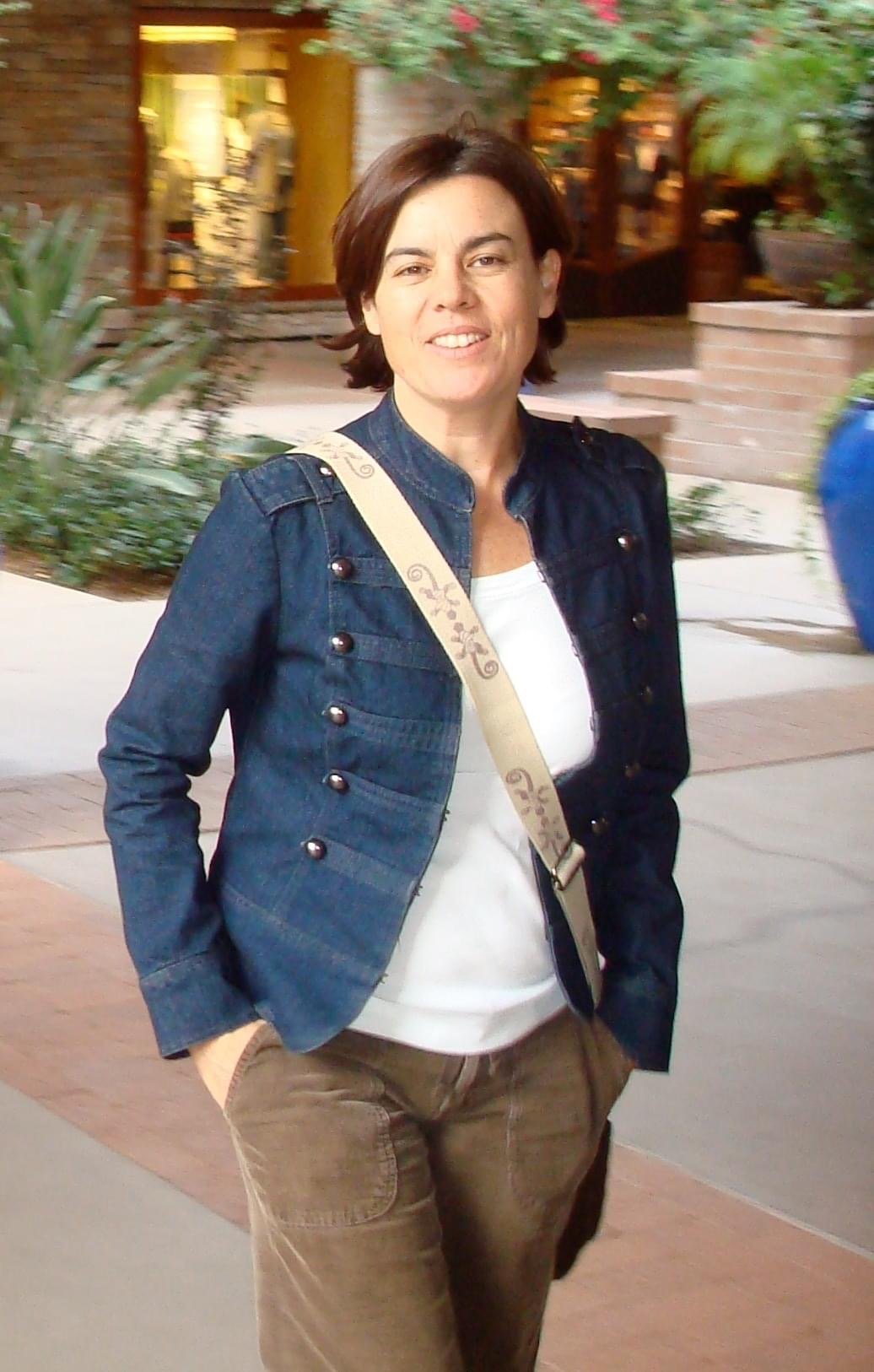
- González in 2013
- Born: 1969; La Orotava, Spain
- Died: 2014 (aged 44–45); Tucson, USA
- Education: University of La Laguna
- Occupations: astrophysicist, researcher
- Employer: National Solar Observatory

Irene González Hernández (La Orotava, October 20, 1969 – Tucson, February 13, 2014) was a Spanish researcher and astrophysicist, promoter of the development of holographic techniques in local helioseismology, which allow detecting solar activity in the non-visible hemisphere of the Sun.

== Biography ==
González graduated in physics, specializing in Astrophysics, in 1992 at the University of La Laguna. Subsequently, she obtained an FPI Scholarship to carry out her doctoral thesis at the Instituto de Astrofísica de Canarias (Institute of Astrophysics of the Canary Islands, IAC), within the Solar Seismology Group. Her work was focused on the scientific exploitation of the new high-quality data that the Global Oscillation Network Group project was providing, one of whose instruments, and nodes, was located at the Teide Observatory.

Her thesis, titled Synoptic map of transverse flows in the upper layers of the solar convection zone (Mapa sinóptico de flujos transversales en las capas altas de la zona de convección solar), was directed by astrophysicist Jesús Patrón. In this work, the "ring diagram" technique was improved and expanded for the precise obtaining of horizontal velocity fluxes below the solar surface from measurements of solar oscillations, which became a new discipline within solar physics.

In April 1998, she obtained her Doctorate in Astrophysics, which was followed by various stays in research centers, which took her to the National Solar Observatory (NSO), to Stanford University, and to the Queen Mary University of London in the United Kingdom. In 2001 she temporarily ceased its research activity.

In 2003, she returned to the NSO with a senior research contract to lead a project developing holographic techniques that detect solar activity in the non-visible hemisphere of the Sun. González developed this new technique, which allows predicting fundamental characteristics of the activity that should appear in the visible hemisphere due to the rotation movement. Its implications in the so-called Space weather, or Space Meteorology, have made it a reference in that field of research. She died in 2014.

== Works ==
- 2014 - Solar Origins of Space Weather and Space Climate. Springer. ISBN 978-1493911813.

== Awards & recognitions ==
In 2014, having already died, at the helioseismology congress HELAS VI/ SOHO 28/SPACEINN her career was remembered in the session The Legacy of Irene González Hernández. That same year, the mini planet 90455 Irenehernandez (2004CU2) was named in her memory, in recognition of González's contributions to the knowledge of the Sun.

In 2015, the La Orotova City Council honored her with a plaque and a central street in her hometown. At the same time, the Secondary Education Institute, IES La Orotava, began the Irene González Hernández Science and Technology Conference, which has continued annually. A couple of years later, in 2017, the Villa de Arriba municipal children's school in the municipality of La Orotava was inaugurated with her name.

In 2021, the Spanish Foundation for Science and Technology (FFECYT) and the Spanish Astronomy Society (SEA) held the exhibition titled AstrónomAs in which González was featured.
