= Karl-Otto Kiepenheuer =

German astronomer and astrophysicist (1910–1975)

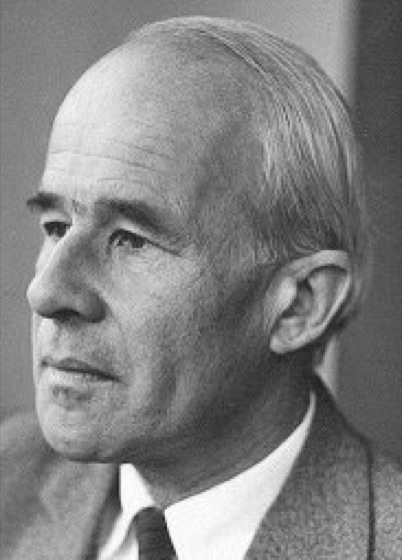
- Born: 10 November 1910; Weimar, Germany
- Died: 23 May 1975 (aged 64); Ensenada, Mexico
- Education: Technical University of Munich
- Scientific career
- Workplaces: Fraunhofer-Institut 1943–1975
- Doctoral advisor: Max von Laue

Karl-Otto Kiepenheuer (10 November 1910 – 23 May 1975) was a German astronomer and astrophysicist. His research focused on the Sun, and for that purpose he initiated construction of several solar telescopes and founded the Kiepenheuer Institute for Solar Physics.

== Life and work ==
Kiepenheuer was born in 1910 in Weimar, Germany, as a son of the publisher Gustav Kiepenheuer. After the divorce of his parents in 1923 he stayed with his mother. In 1929, he began his studies of physics, astronomy and mathematics at the Technische Hochschule in Charlottenburg (now Technische Universität Berlin) and the University of Berlin. He spent one semester in Paris where he visited the Meudon observatory. He later worked at the Göttingen Observatory where he tried to develop a method to measure the UV radiation of the Sun. After an unsuccessful attempt at Jungfraujoch, he realized that the elevation of 3,454 meters was insufficient for this measurement. The balloon-borne instruments of Erich Regener proved to be more useful and Regener was able to measure the UV radiation of the Sun at a height of more than 30 km. Kiepenheuer also improved aerial cameras and tested them during World War II in high-altitude flights over the United Kingdom. Until the end of the war, Kiepenheuer worked under the supervision of Johannes Plendl. The effect of solar activity on shortwave communication stimulated the observations of the Sun. For this purpose, Kiepenheuer built a network of solar observatories and also used the already existing observatories in the occupied areas of Europe. By 1942, this network spanned from Simeiz in the Crimea in the east to Paris in the west, and from Tromsø, Norway in the north to Syracuse, Sicily in the south. After the war, Kiepenheuer benefited from his close connections with researchers all over Europe and managed to slowly establish a scientific network for solar observations.

Together with the solar telescopes at the Schauinsland, Kiepenheuer established the Fraunhofer Institute near Freiburg in 1943. He was able to keep the solar telescopes in Schauinsland after the Second World War. In 1954, he opened a new solar telescope on the Italian island of Capri. The Fraunhofer Institute was named after the physicist Joseph von Fraunhofer and had no connection to the later institutes of the Fraunhofer Society, which were independently named after the same person. Kiepenheuer served as the head of his Institute until his death in 1975. He helped to establish collaboration between several European countries in building a European solar observatory. He was also active in the development of new telescopes. After his death, a new telescope was built on the Spanish island of Tenerife, and therefore, the outdated observatory at Capri was closed in 1988.

== Honors ==
He was awarded the Prix Jules Janssen by the Société astronomique de France in 1968. In 1978, his Institute was renamed the Kiepenheuer Institute for Solar Physics. In November 2018, name of the institute was renamed to Leibniz Institute for Solar Physics (KIS) to highlight the institute’s membership in the Leibniz Association.
