= La Murta Observatory =

Observatory in Murcia, Spain

Coordinates: 37°50′25″N 1°12′10″W

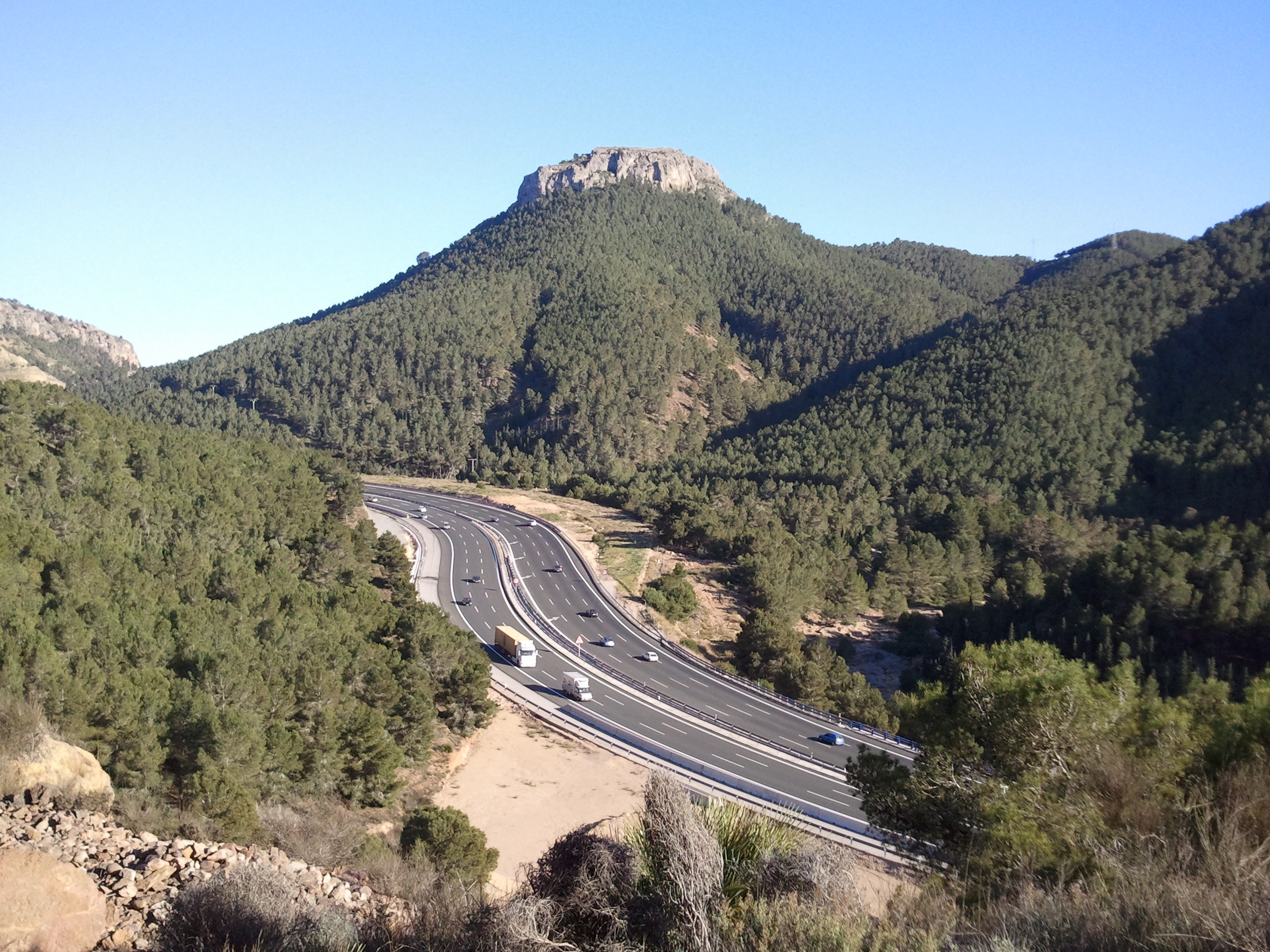
La Murta

La Murta Observatory is an astronomical observatory located in the Spanish city of Murcia, more specifically in the Carrascoy mountains. It is municipal property and has the Observatory Code J76 of the MPC.1. The observatory is mainly dedicated to dissemination since 2001, the systematic monitorization of comets and asteroids in the Solar System.

Some of its achievements is the discovery of an asteroid in 2008 cataloged with the code (448051) 2008 FW61 by the MPC.2 La Murta has also collaborated with NASA in the Deep Impact and Dawn missions, as well as with the Institute of Space Sciences (CSIC-IEEC) and the Instituto de Astrofísica de Canarias (IAC).
