= Bradford Robotic Telescope =

Telescope

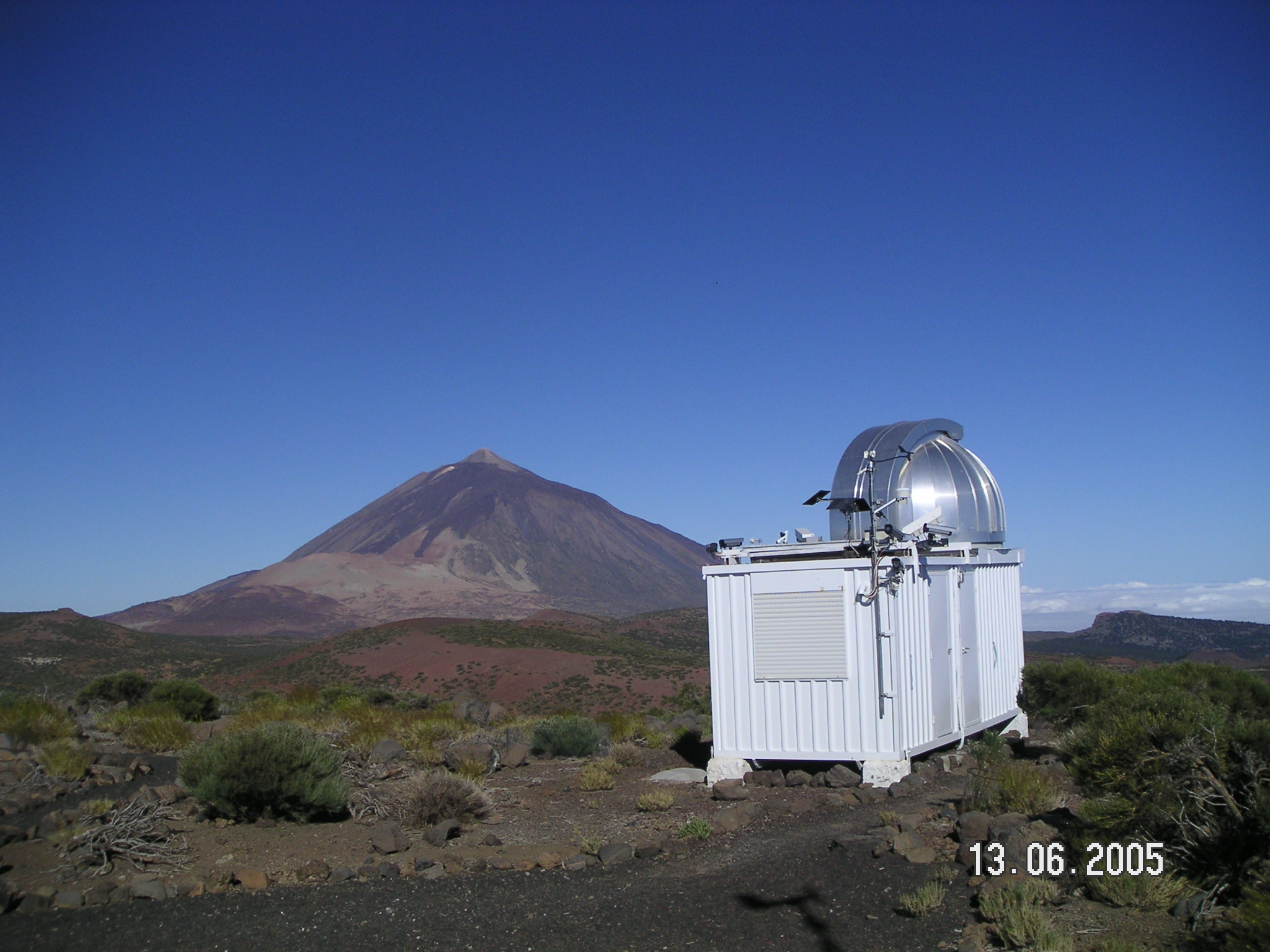
- The Bradford Robotic Telescope against the peak of Teide
- Location(s): Spain
- Coordinates: 28°17′54″N 16°30′34″W
- Altitude: 2,400 m (7,900 ft)
- Diameter: 35.5 cm (1 ft 2.0 in)
- Website: www.telescope.org
- Location within Spain
- Related media on Commons

The Bradford Robotic Telescope (BRT) is an autonomous astronomical telescope located at Teide Observatory, Tenerife in the Canary Islands. It is owned by the University of Bradford and was built between 2002 and 2004 for remote use by schools and individuals worldwide. As of November 2009, the observatory has returned over 70,000 images and has more than 23,000 users.

On May 15, 2016, the BRT team announced via email to registered users that control of the Bradford Telescope would be transferred to the Open University, and renamed the Autonomous Robotic Telescope (ART).

The transfer of the telescope assets to the Open University was completed in 2016. The original telescope hardware is in the process of being decommissioned (May 2017) and has been replaced by two telescopes on Mount Teide, the Physics Innovations Robotic Telescope Explorer (PIRATE) and the COmpletely Autonomous Service Telescope (COAST) installed as part of the OpenSTEM Labs facility.

== Mount ==
All the hardware is mounted on top of a 2-meter high pier, which rests on the top of the bed rock of the mountain. The pier is made of steel and is filled with sand to prevent further damping. The Paramount ME mount is an equatorial mount, which means that RA axis points to the celestial pole, thus enabling the systems to track objects without field rotation.

== Instrumentation ==
The Bradford Robotic Telescope consists of three optical systems providing varying fields of view.

== Control systems ==
In March 2003, a new dome arrived at the site. It uses the Meridian Controls system to control the full dome remotely. No human intervention is required.

== Weather systems ==
The BRT Weather Station runs 24x7, but is unreliable. It is because the observatory is located very high up. It often occurs that there is haze or cloud cover, right till the bottom of the observatory. So, the observatory weather system relies on the meteorological forecasts from the weather station at Observatorio del Teide. It gives details such as wind speed and direction, solar radiation, internal and external humidity, etc. The main function of the weather station is to provide a signal to the safety control systems. It generates an 'alert' that describes what the weather conditions are. The safety systems have a set of 'rules' that determine bad weather. If any of these 'rules' are met, then the safety systems generates an alert that instruct the control systems to act accordingly.

== The different cameras ==
=== Galaxy camera ===
Category	Details
Camera	FLI MicroLine fitted with an E2V CCD47-10. 1024 x 1024 pixels, each 13 μm square
Filter	FLI CFW-2 Eight position filter wheel
Focus	Optec TCF-s Temperature Controlled Focuser
Optical	Schmidt-Cassegrain Celestron C14 optical tube. 3910mm focal length, 355mm aperture at f/11. A Celestron focal reducer gives an effective focal length of 1877mm at f/5.3.
Field of view	Approximately 24 arc minutes square

=== Cluster camera ===
Category	Details
Camera	FLI MaxCam CM2-1 fitted with an E2V CCD47-10. 1024 x 1024 pixels, each 13 μm square
Filter	FLI CFW-2 Eight position filter wheel
Focus	Fixed focus point
Optical	Nikon 200mm lens
Field of view	Approximately 3 degrees square

=== Constellation camera ===
Category	Details
Camera	FLI MaxCam CM2-1 fitted with an E2V CCD47-10. 1024 x 1024 pixels, each 13 μm square
Filter	FLI CFW-2 Eight position filter wheel
Focus	Fixed focus point
Optical	Nikon 16mm lens at f/2.8
Field of view	Approximately 40 degrees square
