= Rafael Rebolo López =

Spanish astrophysicist

- Rafael Rebolo
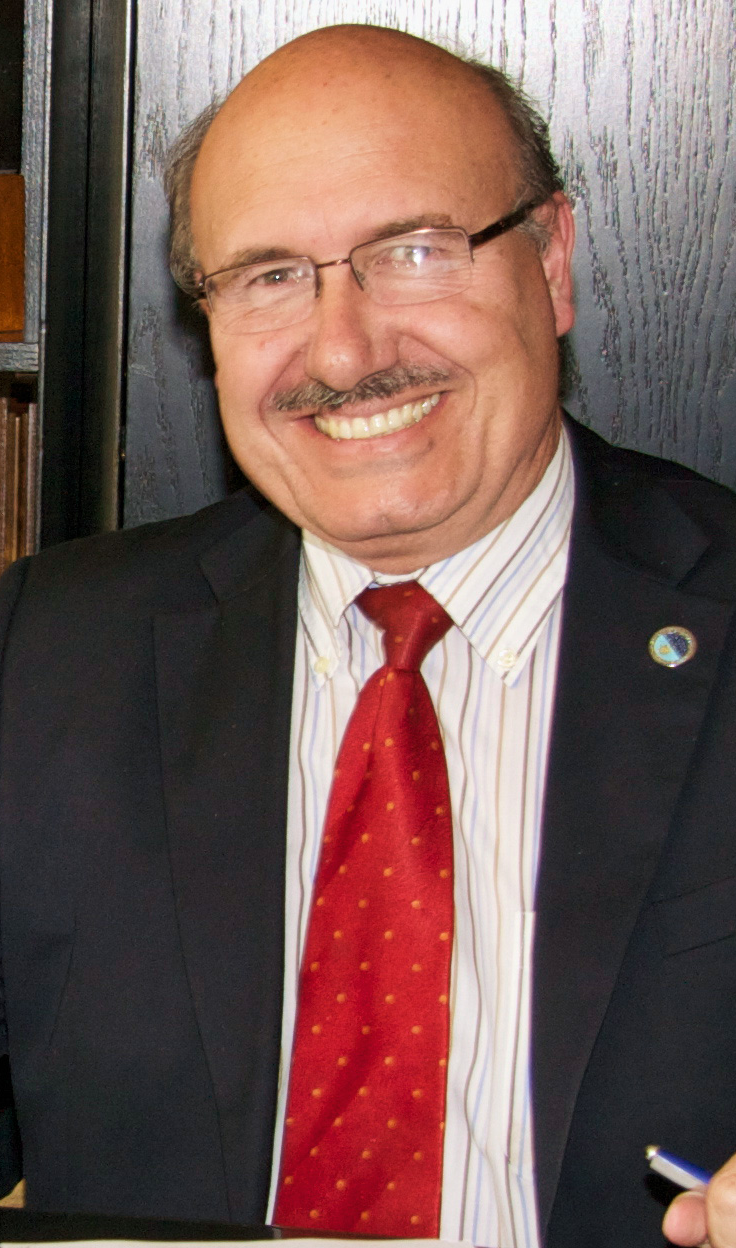
- Born: Cartagena, Spain
- Citizenship: Spanish
- Education: PhD, astrophysics
- Alma mater: University of Grenada, University La Laguna
- Awards: Jaime I Research Prize (2001); Medalla de Honor al Fomento de la Invención (2004); Prix Jules Janssen (2014); Premio Nacional de Investigación Blas Cabrera (2018)
- Scientific career
- Workplaces: Institute of Astrophysics of the Canary Islands, Consejo Superior de Investigaciones Científicas,

Rafael Rebolo López (born September 12, 1961, in Cartagena, Spain) is a Spanish astrophysicist. In October 2013 he became the director of the Instituto de Astrofísica de Canarias (Institute of Astrophysics of the Canary Islands; IAC). He is a professor at the Spanish National Research Council. In 2002 Rebolo became an external professor at the Max Planck Institute for Astronomy and a member of the Max Planck Society.

== Education ==
Rebolo earned a degree in physics from the University of Granada in 1984 and a doctorate in astrophysics from the University of La Laguna in 1987.

== Career ==
1984 Rafael Rebolo began as a researcher at the Institute of Astrophysics of the Canary Islands ( IAC).

1997-1999 served as head of the IAC Research Division. In 1998

1998 Rebolo began to serve as a Spanish National Research Council (CSIC) Professor of Research in Physical Science

2002 Rebolo became a member of the Max Planck Society and External Professor at the Max Planck Institute for Astronomy in Heidelberg.

Rebolo has developed research projects in cosmology, in stellar physics and exoplanets, involving the study of the cosmic microwave background, the characterization of sub-stellar objects and black holes and the search for Earth-like exoplanets.

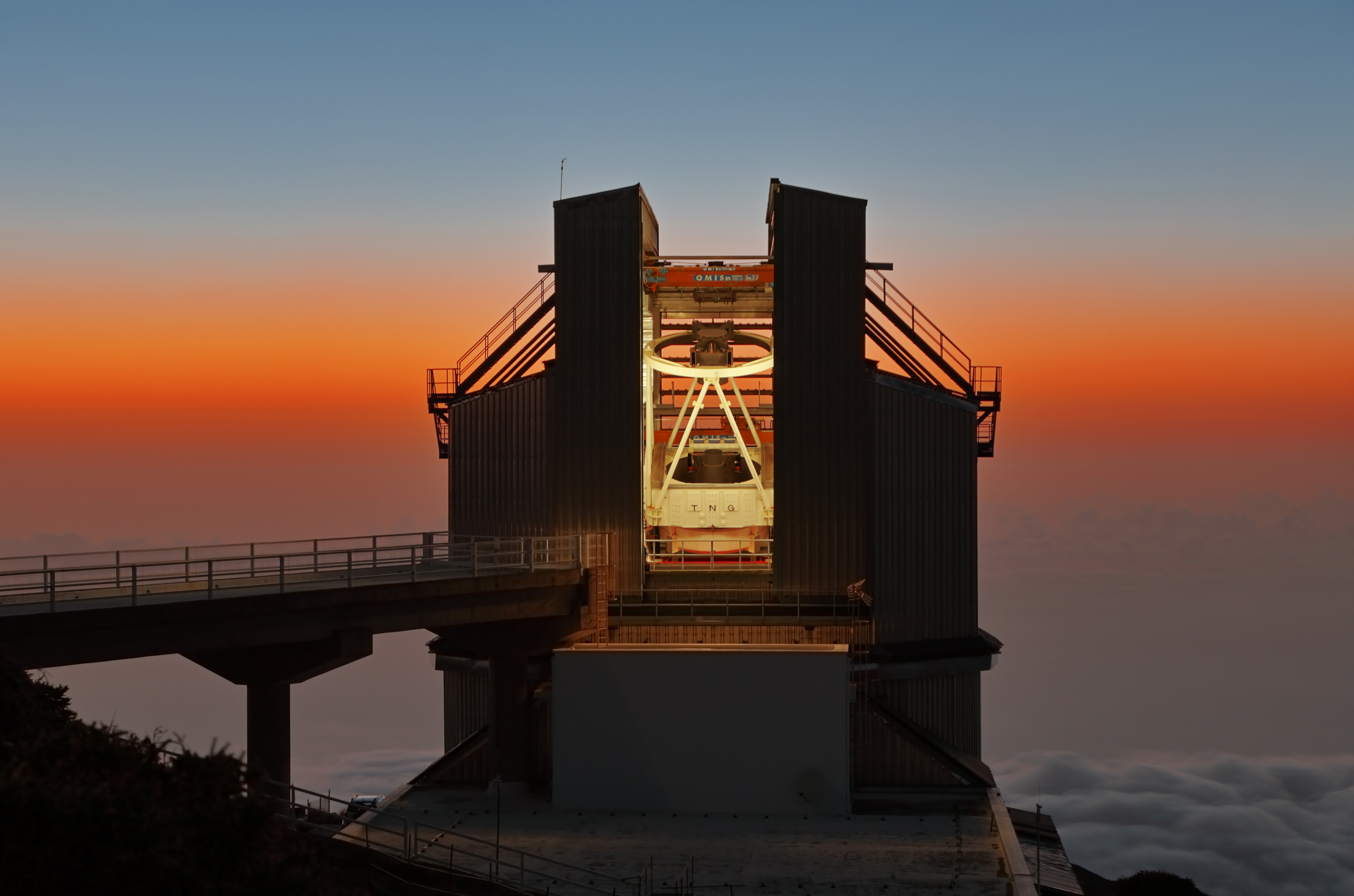
The TNG is a 3.58-meter Italian telescope, located at the "Roque de los Muchachos" Observatory in the Canary Islands, Spain.

Rebolo and his team were responsible for the discovery in 1995 of the first brown dwarfs Brown dwarfs are objects with properties intermediate between stars and giant planets. He was part of the discovery of several giant extrasolar planets in 2000, Rebolo provided empirical evidence in 1999 of the physical connection between supernovae and black holes. He has been a pioneer in Spain in the experimental research of the cosmic microwave background. Rebolo has developed experiments in astrophysical observation at the Observatorio del Teide in collaboration with the Universities of Manchester and Cambridge.

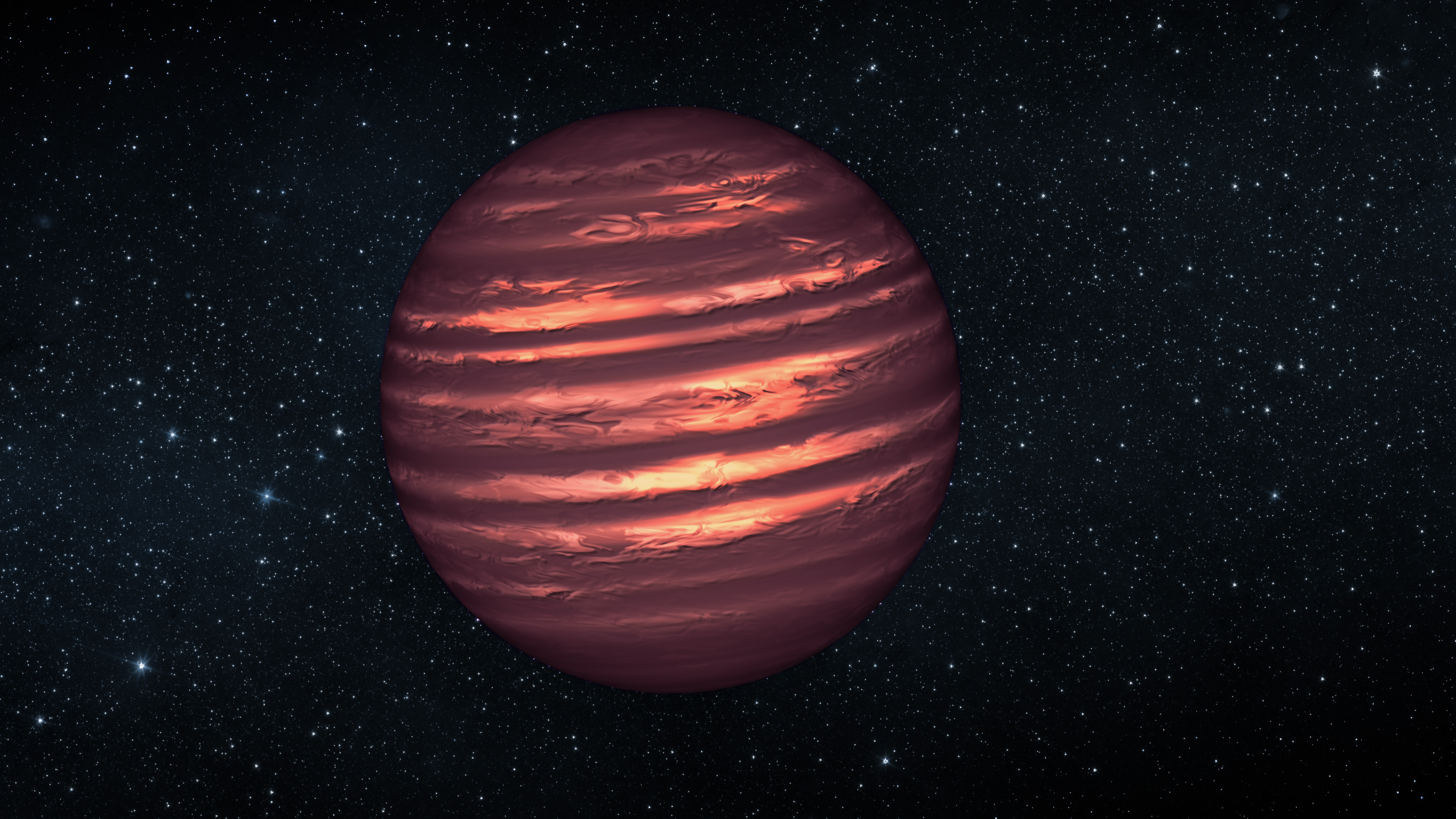
Brown dwarf, artists conception, smaller than a star bigger than a planet

Rebolo leads the QUIJOTE consortium for measuring the polarization of the cosmic microwave background with telescopes in Tenerife. He is co-director of a high-precision spectrograph ESPRESSO for detecting exo-Earths with the 8 m Very Large Telescope (VLT) ) in Chile, and the AOLI project for high spatial resolution imaging on the 4.2 m William Herschel Telescope at the Roque de los Muchachos Observatory in La Palma, Canary Islands. He is co-investigator of the European Space Agency’s Planck and Euclid space missions, and member of the Board of the 10.4 m Gran Telescopio Canarias (GTC) and the Cherenkov Telescope Array. He was also a member of the science committee of the 40 m E-ELT telescope, the steering committees of several European networks in astronomy (OPTICON; EARA) and the US (AURA) and the Scientific Committee "Science Vision for European Astronomy" and co-chair of the "Stars and Planets" panel. He is Scientific director of the "IAC: Severo Ochoa Centre of Excellence" program since 2011.

=== Awards and honors ===
Rebolo is a corresponding member of the Royal Academy of Exact, Physical and Natural Sciences of Spain, Academician of the Academy of Science and Engineering Lanzarote, Honorary Academician of the Academy of Sciences of the Region of Murcia, Doctor Honoris Causa from the Polytechnic University of Cartagena.

- Iberdrola Prize of Science and Technology (2000)
- Jaime I Research Prize (2001)
- Canary Islands Prize for Research (2002)
- Medalla de Honor al Fomento de la Invención / Medal of Honor for the Promotion of the Invention (2004)
- Prix Jules Janssen of the Société astronomique de France (2015)
- Premio Nacional de Investigación Blas Cabrera (2018)
