= Tenerife Experiment =

1984–2000 astronomical experiment

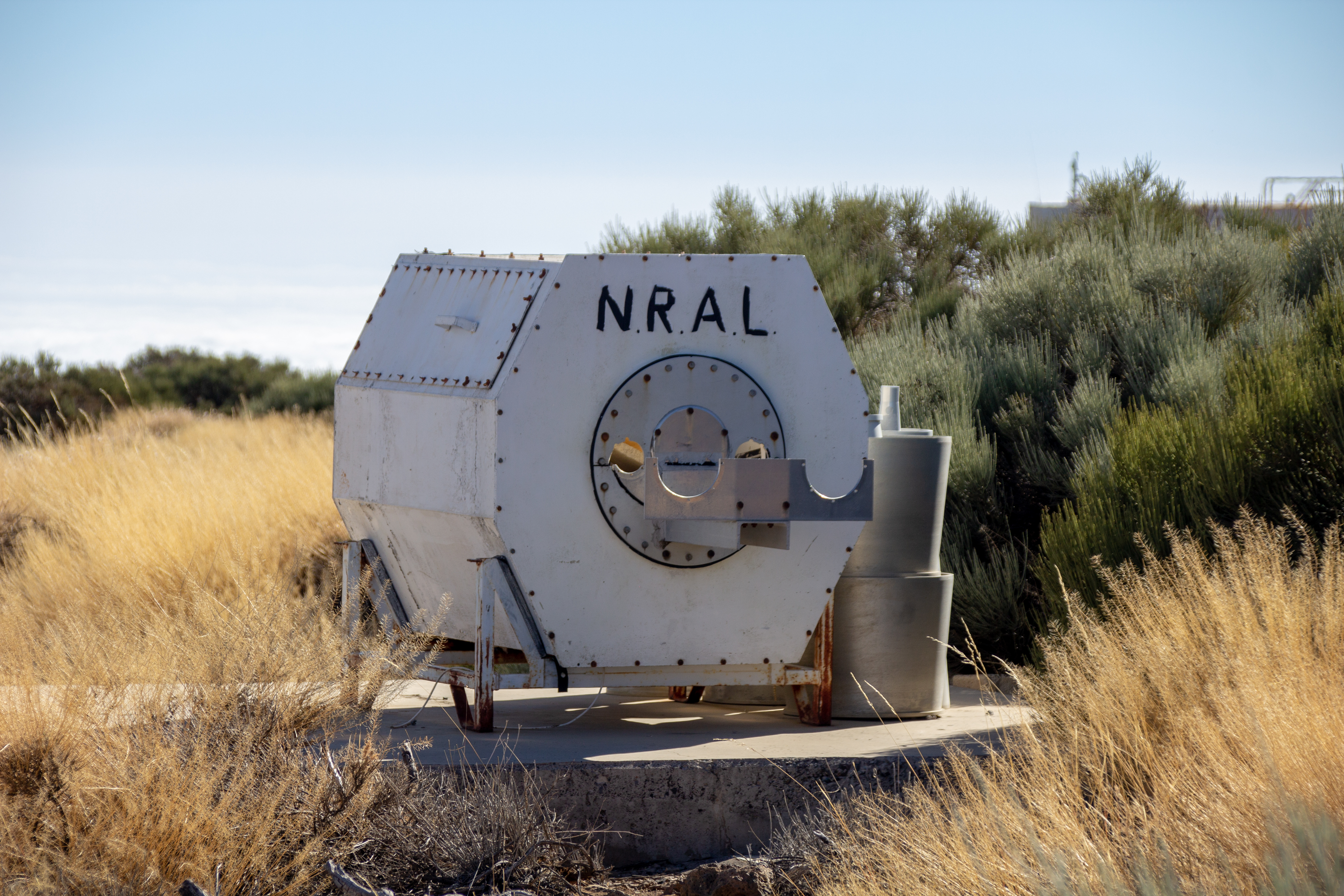
- The remains of the Tenerife Experiment in 2018
- Part of: Teide Observatory
- Location: Spain
- Coordinates: 28°18′01″N 16°30′38″W
- Organization: Instituto de Astrofísica de Canarias; Jodrell Bank Observatory
- Wavelength: 10, 15, 33 GHz (3.00, 2.00, 0.91 cm)
- First light: October 1984
- Decommissioned: 2000
- Telescope style: cosmic microwave background experiment
- Website: www.iac.es/proyecto/cmb/pages/en/former-cmb-experiments/the-tenerife-experiment.php
- Location within Canary Islands
- Related media on Commons

The Tenerife Experiment was a Cosmic Microwave Background (CMB) experiment built by Nuffield Radio Astronomy Laboratories' team at Jodrell Bank observatory which is part of the University of Manchester in collaboration with the Instituto de Astrofisica de Canarias (IAC). It was the first CMB experiment to be installed and run at the Observatorio del Teide in Tenerife, starting operations in October 1984, and running with various upgrades and additional experiments until 2000.

It measured anisotropy of the CMB on angular sizes of 5 degrees, about the size of the upper half of the constellation of Orion (from the "belt" to the "shoulders"). To reduce receiver instability, it performed fast Dicke Switching between two horns separated by 8 degrees. To remove long term drifts and atmospheric variations, it used a further switch of 8 degrees using a flat mirror in front of the horns.
