= GREGOR Solar Telescope =

Solar telescope in the Canary Islands

GREGOR
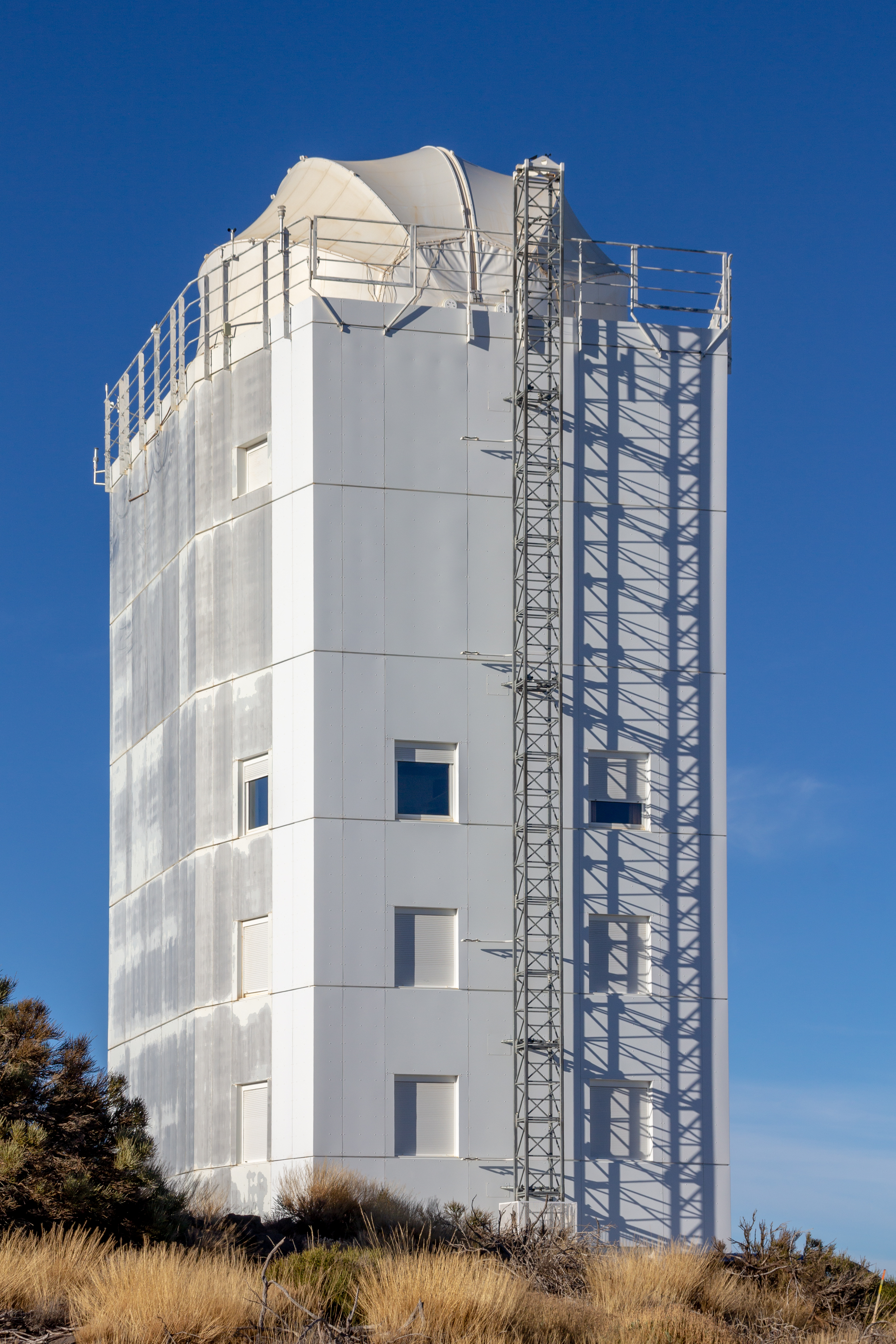
- Location(s): Tenerife, Atlantic Ocean, international waters
- Coordinates: 28°18′06″N 16°30′39″W
- Wavelength: 350 nm (860 THz)–2,000 nm (150 THz)
- Diameter: 1.5 m (4 ft 11 in)
- Focal length: 55.6 m (182 ft 5 in)
- Website: www.leibniz-kis.de/en/observatories/gregor/
- Location within Canary Islands
- Related media on Commons

GREGOR is a solar telescope, equipped with a 1.5-metre primary mirror, located at 2,390 m altitude at the Teide Observatory on Tenerife in the Canary Islands. It replaces the older Gregory Coudé Telescope and was inaugurated on May 21, 2012. First light, using a 1-metre test mirror, was on March 12, 2009.

GREGOR is the third-largest solar telescope in the world, after the Big Bear Observatory and the McMath-Pierce solar telescope. It is aimed at observing the solar photosphere and chromosphere at visible and infrared wavelengths. GREGOR sports a high-order adaptive optics (AO) system with a 256-actuator deformable mirror and a 156-subaperture Shack-Hartmann wavefront sensor. Efforts are underway to implement multi-conjugate AO in 2014.

== 2020 upgrade ==
Initial astigmatism was fixed during an upgrade with some corrective optics: two off-axis parabolic mirrors.

== See also ==
- Vacuum Tower Telescope – Solar telescope on Tenerife operated by KIS
- Swedish Solar Telescope – Telescope on La Plama, Canary Islands
- Dutch Open Telescope – Solar telescope in the Canary Islands
- Roque de los Muchachos Observatory – Astronomical observatory on La Palma, Canary Islands
- List of solar telescopes

== Sources ==
- "GREGOR - A New Telescope for Solar Physics". AIP website. Leibniz Institute for Astrophysics Potsdam.
