= Sorption cooling =

Sorption cooling is a technology that uses heat to produce cooling, by taking advantage of material properties. One substance will heat or refrigerate depending on whether it is absorbed or released by another substance. There may be a third substance that is displaced when the first substance is absorbed and re-absorbed when the first substance is released. The absorption and release are dependent on ambient temperature.
