= Teide Observatory =

Astronomical observatory in the Canary Islands, Spain

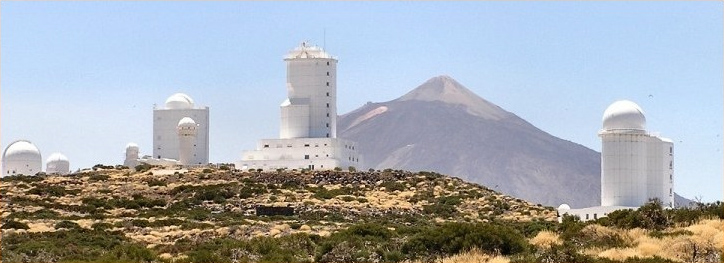
- Alternative names: 954 TEN
- Organization: Instituto de Astrofísica de Canarias
- Observatory code: 954
- Location: Tenerife, Atlantic Ocean, international waters
- Coordinates: 28°18′00″N 16°30′35″W
- Altitude: 2,390 m (7,840 ft)
- Established: 1964
- Website: www.iac.es/en,%20https://www.iac.es/es
- Telescopes: ATLAS–TDO observatory; ESA IZN-1; IAC80; Laboratorio Solar; MASTER telescope; STELLA Telescopes; THEMIS solar telescope; Tenerife Microwave Spectrometer; Vacuum Newton Telescope; COSMOSOMAS; ESA Optical Ground Station; GroundBIRD; QUIJOTE Experiment; Telescopio Carlos Sánchez; Tenerife Experiment; Vacuum Tower Telescope; Very Small Array
- Location within Canary Islands
- Related media on Commons

Teide Observatory (Spanish: Observatorio del Teide), IAU code 954, is an astronomical observatory on Mount Teide at 2,390 metres (7,840 ft), located on Tenerife, Spain. It has been operated by the Instituto de Astrofísica de Canarias since its inauguration in 1964. It became one of the first major international observatories, attracting telescopes from different countries around the world because of the good astronomical seeing conditions. Later, the emphasis for optical telescopes shifted more towards Roque de los Muchachos Observatory on La Palma.

== Telescopes ==
=== Solar telescopes ===
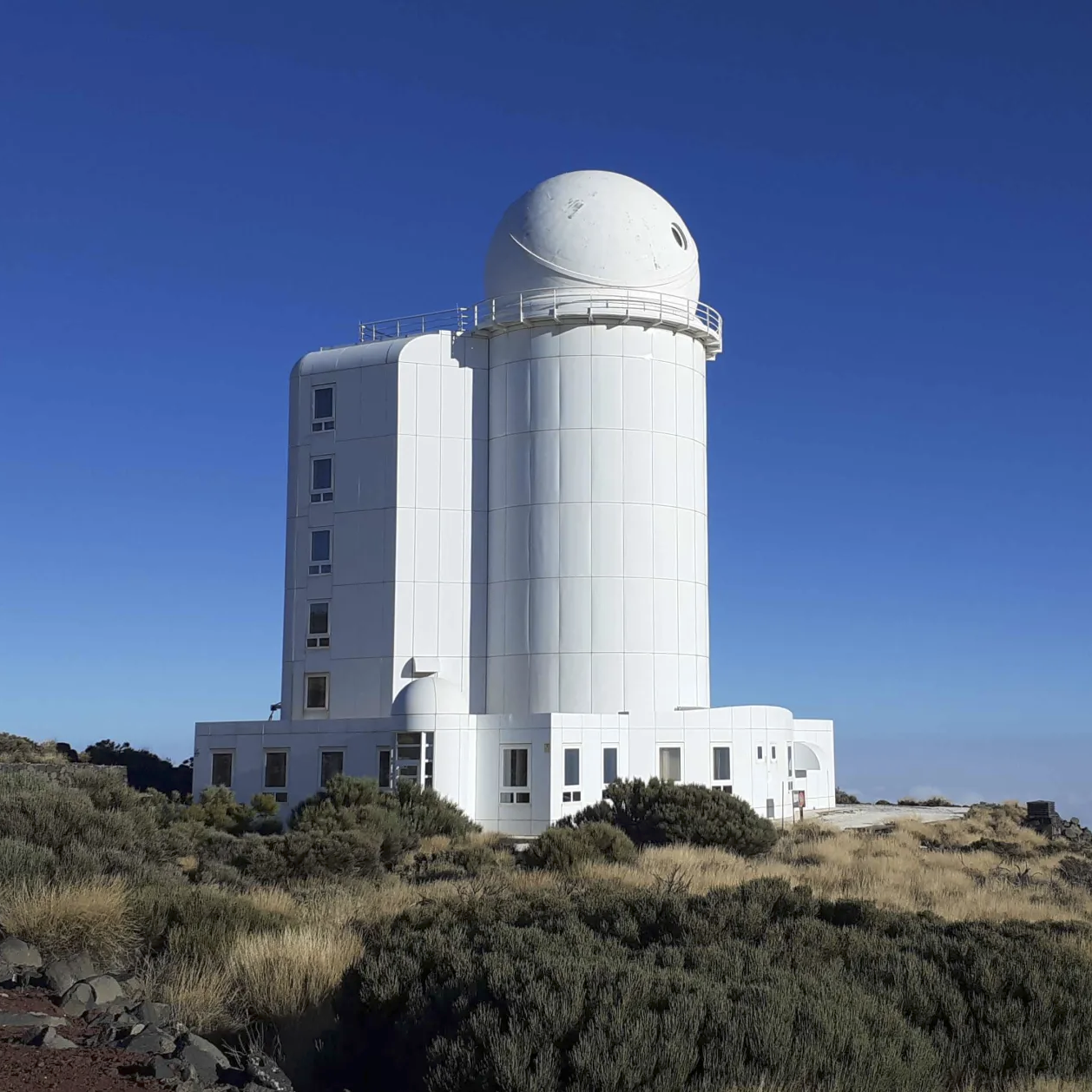
French/Italian Solar Telescope THEMIS.

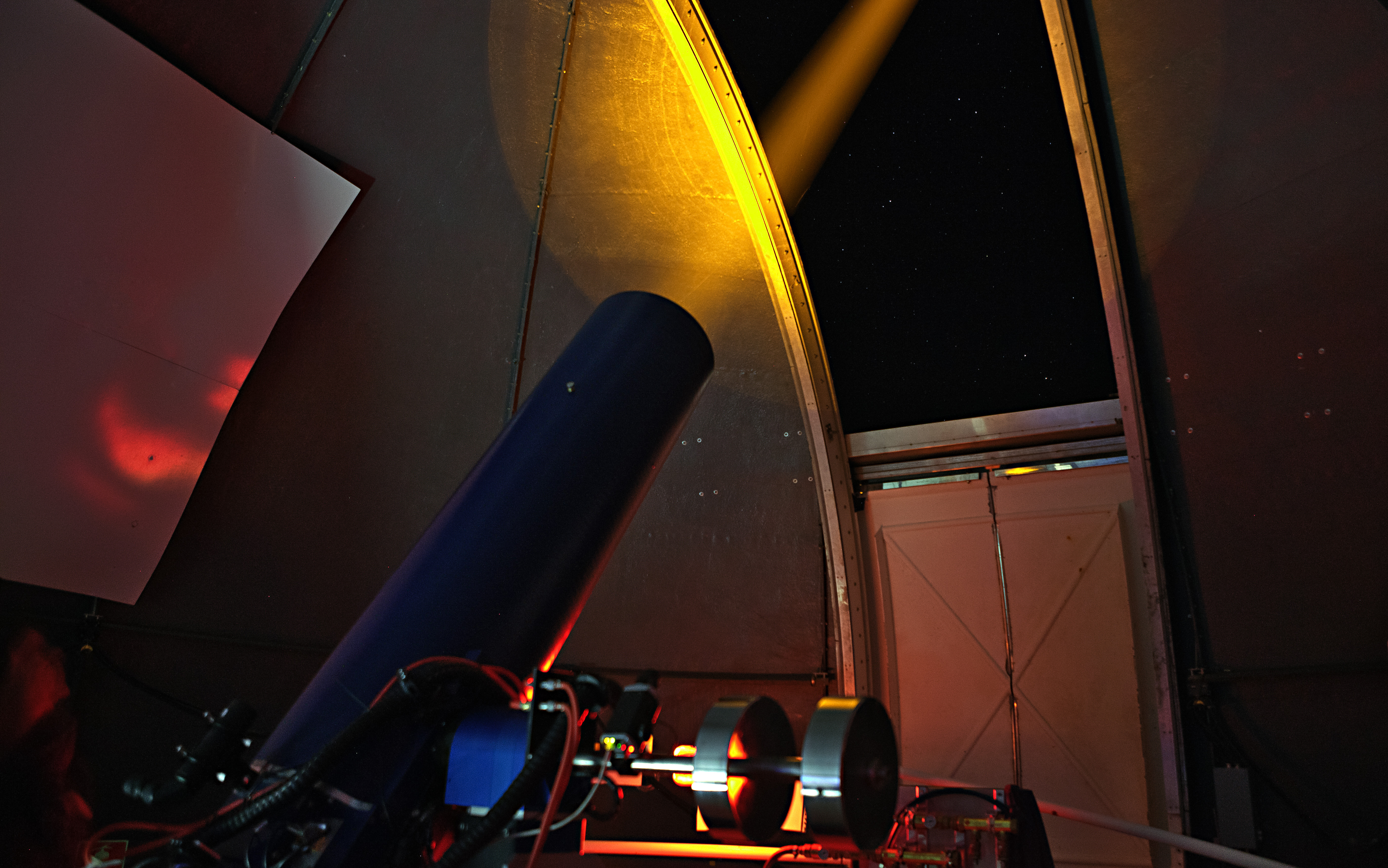
Testing laser systems on the ESO Wendelstein Laser Guide Star system.

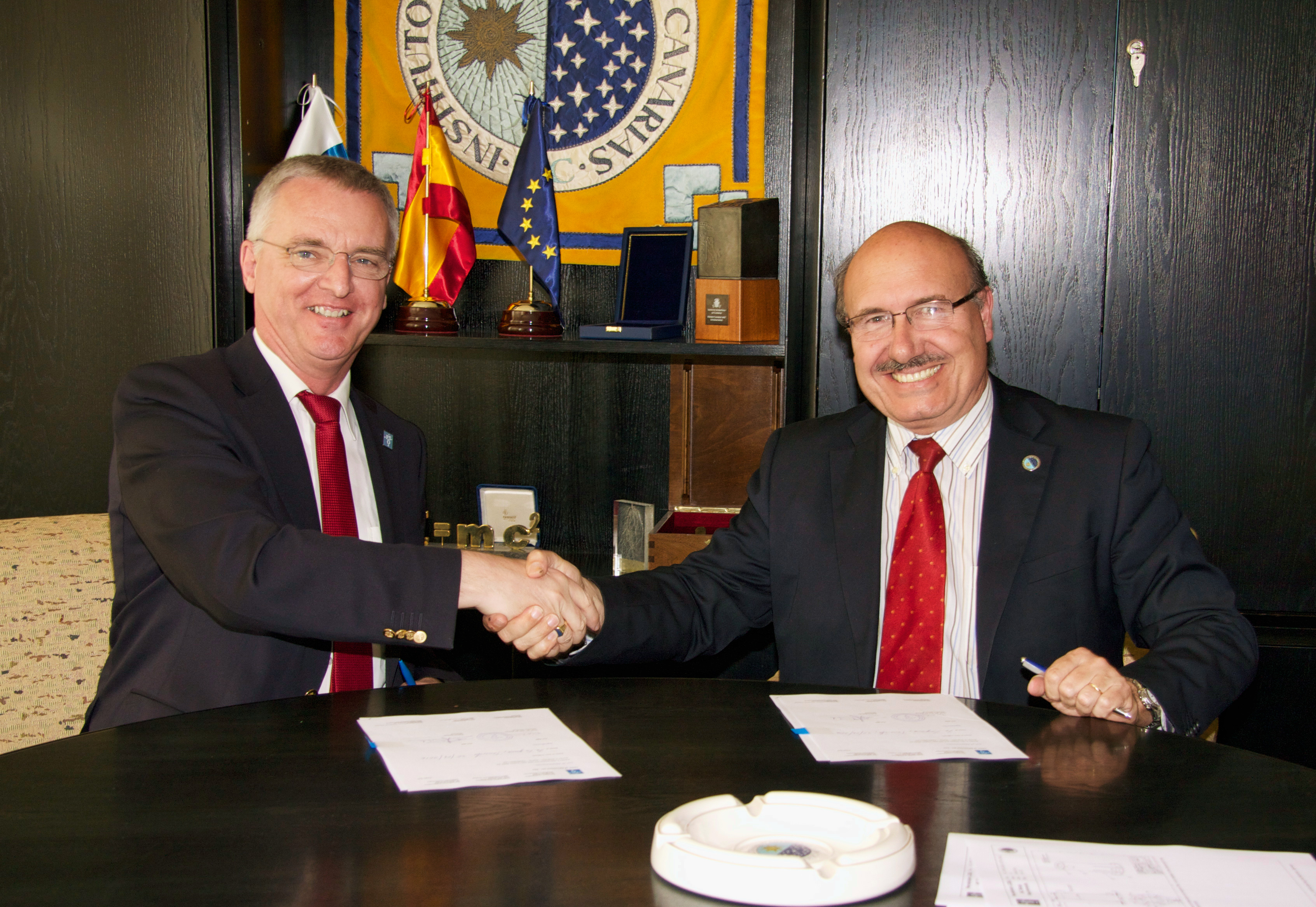
ESO and Instituto de Astrofísica de Canarias sign agreement on adaptive optics collaboration.

- Solar Vacuum Tower Telescope (VTT): 70 cm diameter. Operated by the Kiepenheuer Institute of Solar Physics, Freiburg (Germany). Installed in 1989.
- Télescope Heliographique pour l'Etude du Magnétisme et des Instabilités Solaries (THEMIS) Solar Telescope: 90 cm diameter, built 1996, operated by France and Italy.
- GREGOR Solar Telescope: 1.5 m, operated by a German consortium. In operation since May 2012.
- A node of the Birmingham Solar Oscillations Network (BiSON), operated by the University of Birmingham, UK.
- One of six sites of the GONG network operated by the NSO Integrated Synoptic Program (NISP), United States.

=== Nocturnal telescopes ===
- Carlos Sánchez Infrared Telescope (TCS): 152 cm diameter installed by the UK in 1971
- Mons reflecting telescope: 50 cm diameter, operated by the University of Mons (Belgium), built in 1972.
- IAC-80 Telescope: 80 cm IAC telescope, installed in 1991.
- OGS Telescope: 1 m European Space Agency (ESA) optical ground station for satellite communications, built in 1998.
- STARE Telescope: 10 cm Stellar Astrophysics & Research on Exoplanets. Used by the Trans-Atlantic Exoplanet Survey.
- Bradford Robotic Telescope: 35 cm Telescope for educational use.
- STELLA Telescopes (STELLA I and STELLA II) robotic telescopes: 120 cm STELLA is an abbreviation of STELLar Activity, operated by Leibniz Institute for Astrophysics (AIP) with the collaboration of the IAC, put in operation 2006.
- SLOOH: US robotic telescopes, built in 2004.
- SPECULOOS Northern Observatory (SNO): 1-meter telescopes, one telescope (Artemis) completed in June 2019
- PIRATE: (Physics Innovations Robotic Astronomical Telescope Explorer Mark IV): 61 cm robotic telescope operated remotely by the Open University
- COAST: (COmpletely Autonomous Survey Telescope) 43 cm robotic telescope operated remotely by the Open University
- Two-meter Twin Telescope (TTT): robotic telescopes of 80 cm TTT1 and TTT2 and 2 meters TTT3 and TTT4. TTT is a project of Light Bridges in collaboration with IAC (Spain). Built in 2022.

=== Radio telescopes for cosmic microwave background astronomy ===
- The 33 GHz interferometer
- The COSMOSOMAS Experiment (10 and 15 GHz)
- The Very Small Array (VSA: 14-element interferometer at 30 GHz)
- QUIJOTE CMB Experiment
- GroundBIRD

== Other buildings on the site ==
The observatory has a visitors' centre and a residencia (hostel) for astronomers. Brian May helped construct a building there to study interplanetary dust.

== Discoveries ==
=== First brown dwarf ===
In 1995, Rafael Rebolo López, María Rosa Zapatero-Osorio and Eduardo L. Martín published their discovery of Teide-1, which they found through optical observations using the 0.8 meter telescope at Teide Observatory.

=== Minor planets ===
The Minor Planet Center credits the discovery of several minor planets directly to the observatory.

(79484) 1998 FH_{3}	18 March 1998	list
(100747) 1998 EO_{4}	3 March 1998	list
(175732) 1998 EW_{8}	6 March 1998	list
(219078) 1998 GX	3 April 1998	list
(301883) 1998 EQ_{9}	9 March 1998	list
(455329) 2002 PO_{63}	12 August 2002	list

== Climate ==
The position where the observatory is situated has a mediterranean climate (Köppen Csb), with average temperature features reminiscent of southern England. This renders in warm summers that averages around 23 °C (73 °F) with light frosts being possible and sometimes happening in winter. Extremes are moderated by its marine features, which combined with the altitude keeps temperatures below 30 °C (86 °F) even during heat waves, and in spite of the altitude the marine features are strong enough to prevent severe frosts. Sunshine levels, as typical of the nearby lowland arid climates, are high throughout the year. Many alpine areas at further distance from the equator are above the tree line at this elevation, but Teide is far above even any subarctic temperatures due to its position on the 28th parallel north.

The useful observing time is given as 78% and the median FWHM seeing from DIMM measurements is given as 0.76" and 0.70" at two sites near the Carlos Sánchez Telescope.

Climate data for Izaña Observatory (1991–2020 normals)
Month	Jan	Feb	Mar	Apr	May	Jun	Jul	Aug	Sep	Oct	Nov	Dec	Year
Mean daily maximum °C (°F)	8.0 (46.4)	8.0 (46.4)	10.1 (50.2)	12.3 (54.1)	15.0 (59.0)	19.0 (66.2)	23.0 (73.4)	22.6 (72.7)	18.7 (65.7)	14.6 (58.3)	10.9 (51.6)	9.2 (48.6)	14.3 (57.7)
Daily mean °C (°F)	4.9 (40.8)	4.8 (40.6)	6.5 (43.7)	8.2 (46.8)	10.7 (51.3)	14.4 (57.9)	18.2 (64.8)	18.0 (64.4)	14.5 (58.1)	10.9 (51.6)	7.7 (45.9)	6.1 (43.0)	10.4 (50.7)
Mean daily minimum °C (°F)	1.8 (35.2)	1.6 (34.9)	2.9 (37.2)	4.1 (39.4)	6.4 (43.5)	9.9 (49.8)	13.5 (56.3)	13.4 (56.1)	10.3 (50.5)	7.2 (45.0)	4.5 (40.1)	3.0 (37.4)	6.6 (43.9)
Average precipitation mm (inches)	55.6 (2.19)	49.7 (1.96)	32.9 (1.30)	18.8 (0.74)	3.8 (0.15)	0.5 (0.02)	0.0 (0.0)	9.5 (0.37)	5.6 (0.22)	33.1 (1.30)	50.6 (1.99)	60.3 (2.37)	320.4 (12.61)
Average precipitation days (≥ 1.0 mm)	4.6	3.8	4.0	2.4	0.7	0.1	0.0	0.8	1.0	3.5	4.7	5.1	30.7
Average relative humidity (%)	45.9	50.2	45.8	42.6	35.2	28.3	22.0	28.0	40.5	52.5	52.7	49.3	41.1
Mean monthly sunshine hours	246.5	247.5	300.5	323.3	379.8	398.9	402.4	371.8	319.8	277.1	236.6	233.1	3,737.3
Source: NOAA/NCEI

Climate data for Izaña Observatory (altitude 2369m, 1981–2010 normals, extremes 1920–present)
Month	Jan	Feb	Mar	Apr	May	Jun	Jul	Aug	Sep	Oct	Nov	Dec	Year
Record high °C (°F)	18.3 (64.9)	19.9 (67.8)	22.0 (71.6)	23.0 (73.4)	26.0 (78.8)	27.7 (81.9)	30.4 (86.7)	29.6 (85.3)	27.2 (81.0)	24.6 (76.3)	20.8 (69.4)	20.1 (68.2)	30.4 (86.7)
Mean daily maximum °C (°F)	7.5 (45.5)	8.0 (46.4)	10.2 (50.4)	11.8 (53.2)	14.5 (58.1)	18.9 (66.0)	23.0 (73.4)	22.6 (72.7)	18.6 (65.5)	14.3 (57.7)	11.1 (52.0)	8.8 (47.8)	14.1 (57.4)
Daily mean °C (°F)	4.3 (39.7)	4.7 (40.5)	6.4 (43.5)	7.6 (45.7)	10.1 (50.2)	14.4 (57.9)	18.5 (65.3)	18.2 (64.8)	14.5 (58.1)	10.6 (51.1)	7.8 (46.0)	5.6 (42.1)	10.2 (50.4)
Mean daily minimum °C (°F)	1.1 (34.0)	1.3 (34.3)	2.7 (36.9)	3.5 (38.3)	5.8 (42.4)	9.9 (49.8)	14.0 (57.2)	13.8 (56.8)	10.4 (50.7)	6.9 (44.4)	4.5 (40.1)	2.4 (36.3)	6.4 (43.4)
Record low °C (°F)	−8.0 (17.6)	−9.8 (14.4)	−9.1 (15.6)	−8.2 (17.2)	−5.1 (22.8)	−1.4 (29.5)	−0.2 (31.6)	1.2 (34.2)	0.0 (32.0)	−1.9 (28.6)	−5.0 (23.0)	−6.8 (19.8)	−9.8 (14.4)
Average precipitation mm (inches)	47 (1.9)	67 (2.6)	58 (2.3)	18 (0.7)	7 (0.3)	0 (0)	0 (0)	5 (0.2)	13 (0.5)	37 (1.5)	54 (2.1)	60 (2.4)	392 (15.4)
Average precipitation days (≥ 1.0 mm)	4.5	4.0	4.1	2.7	1.1	0.2	0.1	0.5	1.6	3.7	4.4	5.6	33.4
Average snowy days	2.4	2.5	2.1	0.6	0.2	0	0	0	0	0.2	0.6	1.6	10.2
Average relative humidity (%)	50	54	48	45	40	32	25	30	43	55	54	52	44
Mean monthly sunshine hours	226	223	260	294	356	382	382	358	295	259	220	218	3,473
Source: Agencia Estatal de Meteorología

== See also ==
- Astronomical seeing
- Cerro Tololo Inter-American Observatory
- European Extremely Large Telescope
- Instituto de Astrofísica de Canarias
- La Silla Observatory
- Llano de Chajnantor Observatory
- List of minor planet discoverers § Discovering dedicated institutions
- Mount Teide
- Paranal Observatory
- Pico Viejo
- Roque de los Muchachos Observatory
- Teide National Park
- Very Large Telescope
- Asteroid Terrestrial-impact Last Alert System
