= Instituto de Astrofísica de Canarias =

Astrophysical research institute

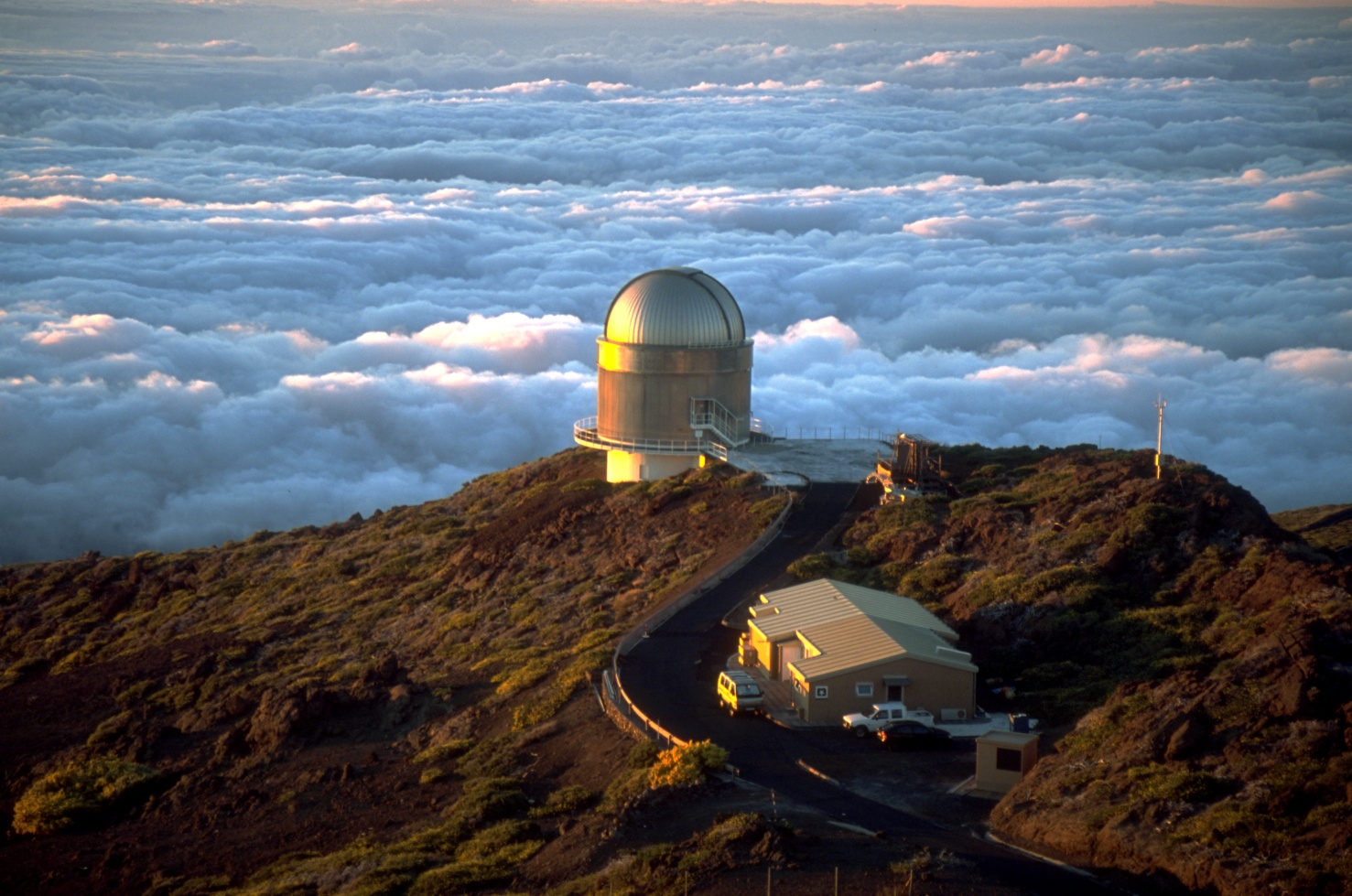
The Nordic Optical Telescope at the Roque de los Muchachos Observatory on the island of La Palma

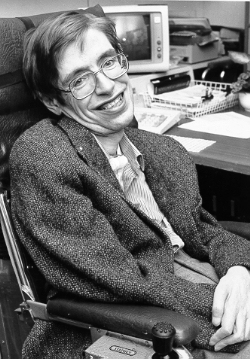
The English scientist Stephen Hawking was appointed Honorary Professor of the Instituto de Astrofísica de Canarias in 2016.

The Instituto de Astrofísica de Canarias (IAC) is an astrophysical research institute located in the Canary Islands, Spain. It was founded in 1975 at the University of La Laguna. It operates two astronomical observatories in the Canary Islands: Roque de los Muchachos Observatory on La Palma, and Teide Observatory on Tenerife.

The current director of the IAC is Valentín Martínez Pillet, who succeeded Rafael Rebolo López on July 1, 2024. In 2016, English scientist Stephen Hawking was appointed Honorary Professor of the IAC, the first such appointment made by the institute.

== See also ==
- Instituto de Astrofísica de Andalucía
- Centro de Estudios de Fisica del Cosmos de Aragon
- Irene González Hernández
