= Cerro Murphy Observatory =

Astronomical observatory in Chile

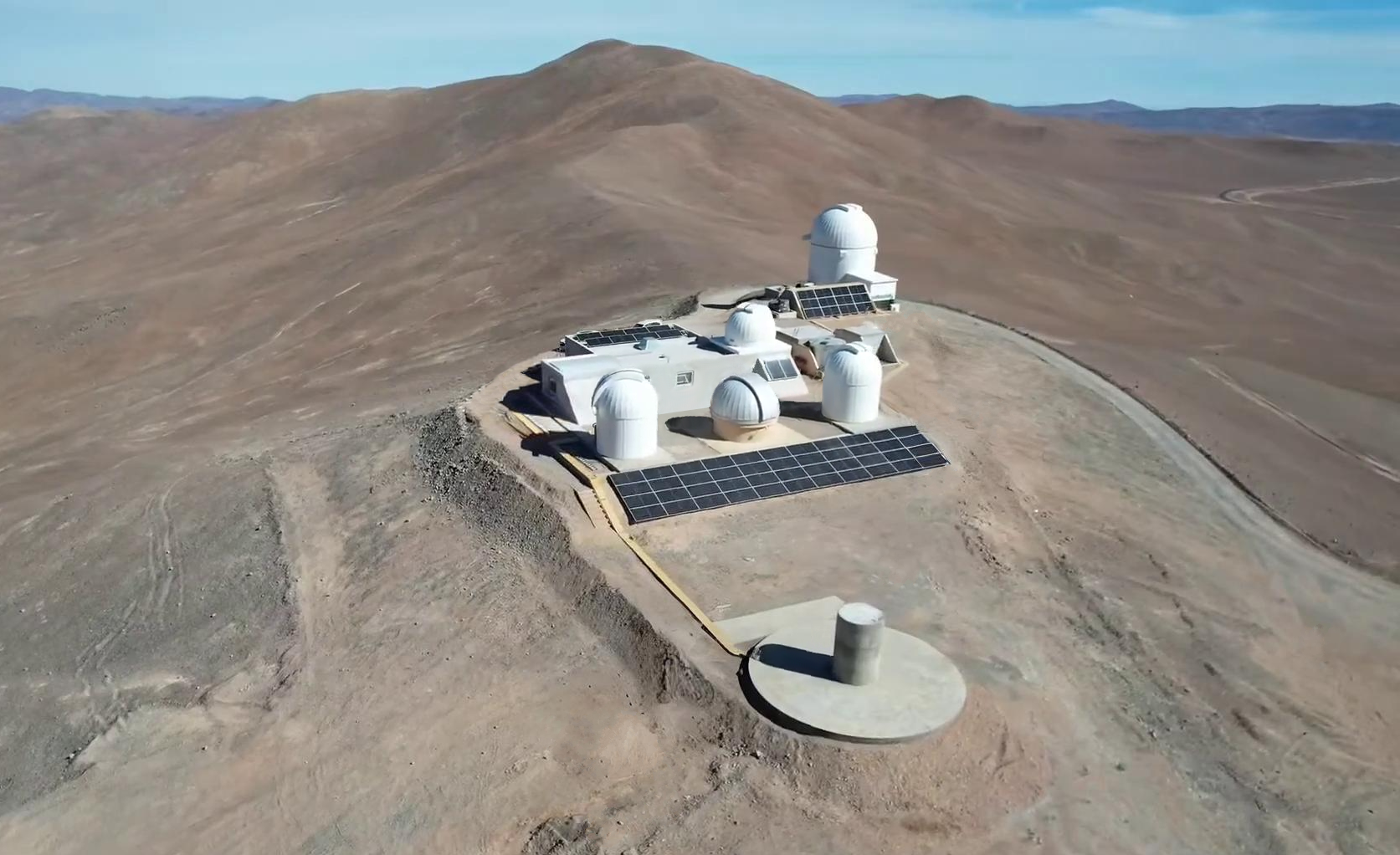
- Organization: Nicolaus Copernicus Astronomical Center of the Polish Academy of Sciences
- Observatory code: I09
- Location: Antofagasta Region, Chile
- Coordinates: 24.59867°S 70.20128°W
- Altitude: 2,817 metres (9,242 ft)
- Established: 2005
- Website: The Araucaria Project – Observatory Cerro Murphy

Telescopes
- jk15: 1.5-m reflector
- zb08: 0.8-m reflector
- jk06: 0.6-m reflector
- IRIS: 0.8-m near-infrared reflector
- Potsdam telescope: 30-cm refractor
- Related media on Commons

Cerro Murphy Observatory (Spanish: Observatorio Cerro Murphy, OCM; Polish: Obserwatorium Cerro Murphy, OCM; German: Observatorium Cerro Murphy, OCM; full name since 2023 is Rolf Chini Cerro Murphy Observatory) is an international astrophysical project hosted by the ESO Paranal Observatory and operated by the Nicolaus Copernicus Astronomical Center of the Polish Academy of Sciences. The observatory is located on Cerro Murphy, which is a hill located 1 kilometre (0.62 miles) to the southwest and 230 metres (750 ft) below the summit of Cerro Armazones, a mountain in the Antofagasta Region of Chile, 120 km (75 mi) south of Antofagasta. OCM is located at 2,817 m (9,242 ft) altitude and currently houses 5 telescopes, whose diameters range between 0.3 and 1.5 m (1 and 5 ft).

The observatory was established in 2005, owned and operated jointly by the Ruhr University Bochum (RUB) and the Catholic University of the North (UCN) until 2020, when it was transferred to the Nicolaus Copernicus Astronomical Center of the Polish Academy of Sciences (CAMK), and is now run by the Araucaria Project. The largest Polish telescope, with a mirror of diameter of 2.5 m (8.2 ft), is currently being built by AstroSysteme Austria (ASA) and will start operations at OCM in 2026.

Three other observatories nearby are: the Paranal Observatory operated by the European Southern Observatory (ESO), the ESO's Extremely Large Telescope (currently under construction), and the Cherenkov Telescope Array gamma-ray telescope (also under construction, hosted by ESO).

== History ==
The land for the observatory was donated to UCN by the Chilean government and it was protected by law for exclusive scientific research, securing the astronomical observations from being affected by possible future mining activities. Initially it was the summit of Cerro Armazones that was considered as the future observatory site, but after the measurements of the wind speed, the decision was made to settle on a slightly lower side hill, which is not so windswept. This hill was named Cerro Murphy to acknowledge the support from Prof. Miguel Murphy at UCN.

The creation and development of the observatory is credited to prof. Rolf Chini from the Ruhr University in Bochum, who has supervised and been involved in all the works in the observatory (from laying the foundations for the telescope rooms and the main building, to setting up the computer network and software to control the telescopes, to carrying out science projects) from the very beginning till the present day.

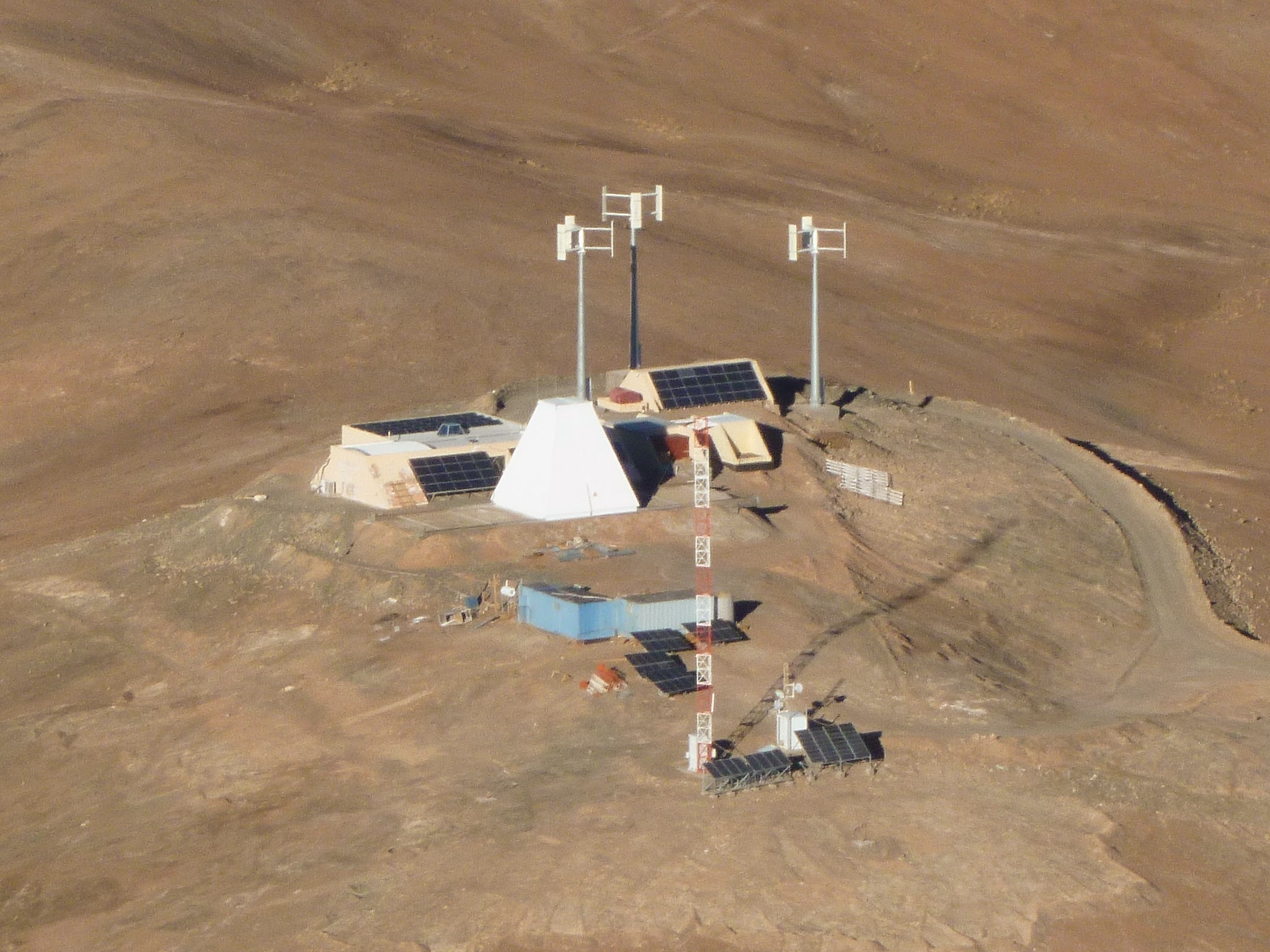
Observatory Cerro Armazones in 2017

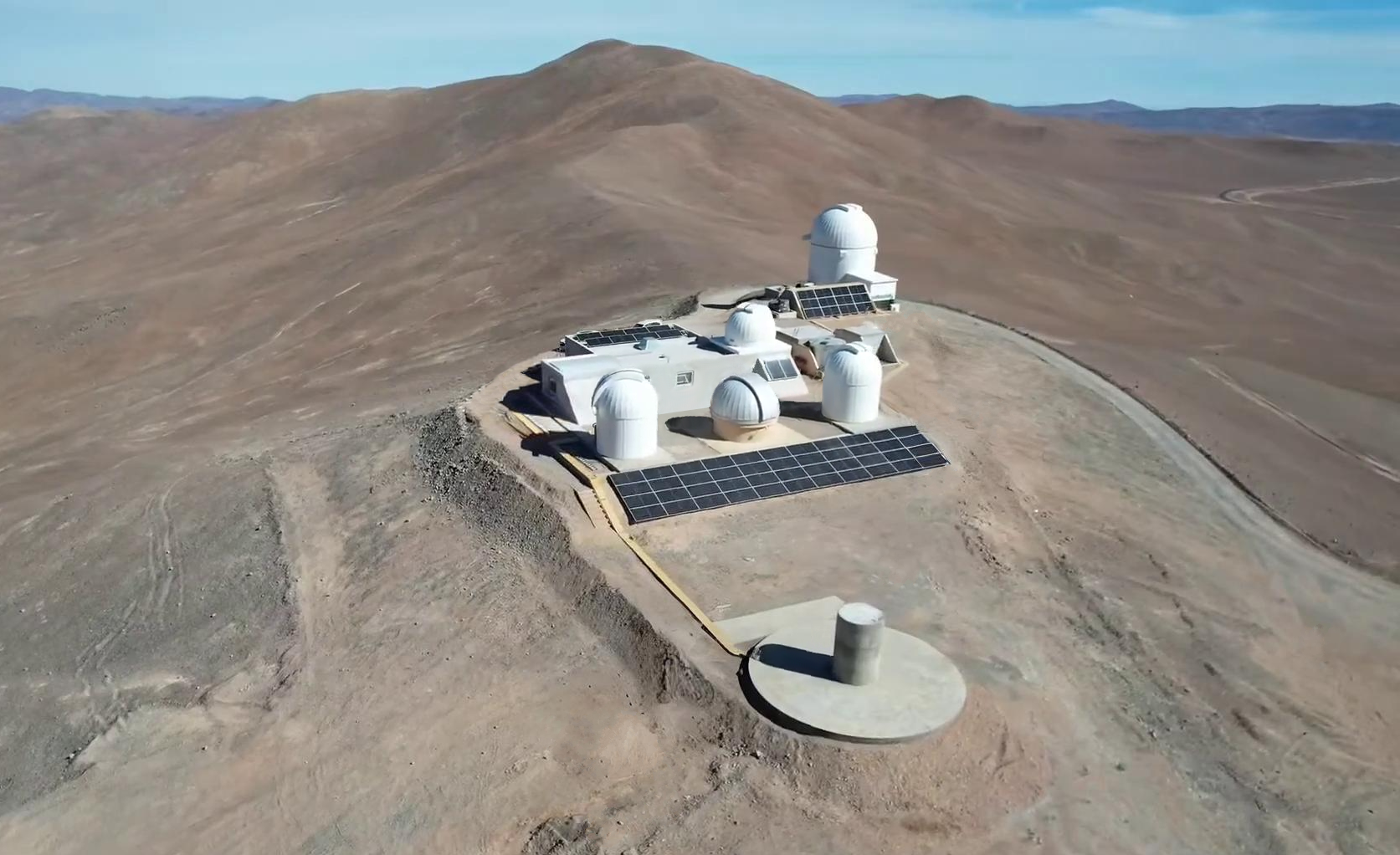
Observatory Cerro Murphy viewed from a drone, shortly after renewal in 2023

The construction of the observatory at Cerro Murphy started in 2005 with cutting the top of the hill to provide a small flat plateau. Originally, the observatory was designed for 3 telescopes: 1.5-metre (59 in) Hexapod-Telescope (HPT) and two smaller auxiliary telescopes. The HPT was installed in 2006, and soon after, on September 28, 2006, the official inauguration of the observatory – initially called the Observatory Cerro Armazones (OCA) – took place in the presence of the German Ambassador in Chile, the president of the Chilean Astronomical Society, the rectors of UCN and RUB, a number of authorities from both universities, and numerous colleagues from ESO, CTIO, and the German Aerospace Center (DLR).

In 2010, within the framework of an ESO/European project (EVALSO) Cerro Murphy was connected by a 1 Gbit/s glass fiber to the Paranal Observatory. This innovation allowed for remote control of the telescopes from Bochum and provided a fast data transfer from Chile to Germany (60 GB per night). Up to that time, the observers had to take their data home on hard disks in their carry-on baggage.

On April 26, 2010, the ESO Council selected Cerro Armazones as the site for the planned ELT. In October 2011, an agreement was signed between the ESO and the Chilean government that includes the donation of 189 km2 of land around Cerro Armazones for the installation of the E-ELT as well as a concession for 50 years relating to the surrounding area. As an inadvertent result of this agreement, the OCA became a telescope project hosted on ESO's land.

In 2017 the Leibniz Institute for Astrophysics in Potsdam (AIP) proposed to install a robotic 30 cm Zeiss refractor to support the satellite mission PLATO. This robotic telescope would stand in place of decommissioned HPT, which by 2017 had accumulated several technical problems, and could not be repaired due to a lack of replacement parts. In 2019 the Potsdam robotic telescope was installed at the observatory.

Also in 2017 an agreement was signed between the Ruhr University Bochum (RUB) and the Nicolaus Copernicus Astronomical Center of the Polish Academy of Sciences (CAMK) for the "use of observing time at the 0.8-m infrared telescope (IRIS)" by the Araucaria Project, led by Prof. Dr. habil. Grzegorz Pietrzyński. This marked the starting point for a fruitful collaboration between the two institutions, which eventually lead to the transfer of OCA to CAMK. The final contract between ESO, CAMK, and RUB was signed on January 17, 2020.

In 2020–2023, the observatory underwent renewal and expansion: 3 new telescopes were built while old ones were decommissioned. This huge scientific and technical undertaking was made possible thanks to generous financial support from the Polish Ministry of Education and Science, and the European ERC Synergy scientific grant, awarded to Prof. Pietrzyński. This financial support facilitates the construction of a 2.5-m telescope, which will be the largest Polish telescope ever built. So far, the telescope pillar has been erected, while subsequent construction phases are expected in 2024–2026.

On 28 November 2023, the inauguration of the renovated observatory took place, which was the occasion to announce the renaming of the observatory from the Cerro Armazones Observatory (OCA) to the Rolf Chini Cerro Murphy Observatory, abbreviated as the Observatory Cerro Murphy (OCM). The name change highlights a new chapter in the observatory's history featuring scientific projects related to the calibration of the cosmic distance scale (the main specialisation of the Araucaria Project), and emphasises the contribution of Prof. Rolf Chini, who supervised and participated in all construction work at the observatory. The name change also removes ambiguity regarding the location of the observatory; in Chile it is customary for observatories to bear the names of the hills on which they stand, and the ELT is being built on the top of Cerro Armazones.

== Telescopes ==
=== Operational ===
- 1.5-metre (59 in) telescope Janusz Kałużny is an Alt-Az telescope built by an Austrian company ASA, equipped with a professional 4k x 4k Andor iKon-XL 230 camera. It has an impressive number of filters (16): Strömgren (u b v y), Hα wide, Hα narrow, Hβ wide, Hβ narrow, Sloan (u g r i z), and Johnson-Cousins (B V Ic). It also supports a high-resolution spectrograph, BESO (which is a clone of the ESO high-resolution spectrograph FEROS, and has a wavelength range = 3700Å–8600Å, resolution λ/Δλ = 48000).
- 0.8-metre (31 in) telescope Zbigniew "Zibi" Kołaczkowski is an Alt-Az telescope built by an Austrian company ASA. In one of its 4 foci a professional 2k x 2k Andor iKon-L 936 camera is mounted, guaranteeing a field of view of 17.2' x 17.2'. One filter wheel accommodates Sloan filters (u g r i z) and Johnson-Cousins filters (B V Ic), while the other has a diffuser, that allows to observe bright stars without saturation.
- 0.6-metre (24 in) telescope Wojtek Krzemiński is a telescope built by an Austrian company ASA on the equatorial mount, and equipped with a professional 2k x 2k Andor iKon-L 936 camera. The collection of filters – Strömgren (u b v y), Hβ wide, Hβ narrow, Johnson-Cousins (B V Ic) – is complemented by a diffuser, that allows to observe bright stars without saturation.
- IRIS (InfraRed Imaging System) is an 0.8-metre (31 in) telescope on an Alt-Az mount with two Nasmyth foci that can be reached via a computer-controlled movable third mirror. It was founded by RUB, made by Halfmann Teleskoptechnik, and installed in 2010. IRIS is equipped with a 1k x 1k infrared camera, donated by the Institute of Astronomy at the University of Hawaii; there are various broad and narrow band filters between 1.1 and 2.5 μm. The optical system provides a resolution of 0.74''/pixel and a field-of-view of 13' x 13'; the limiting magnitude is K ≈16 mag. Thus IRIS exceeds the capabilities of 2MASS.
- 30-centimetre (12 in) Ballistische Messkammern (BMK), built by Carl Zeiss Jena, is a robotic refractor, equipped with wide-field 10k x 10k camera, providing a field of view of 13.6° x 13.6°. It was installed in 2017–2019 by the Leibniz Institute for Astrophysics in Potsdam with the purpose of observing the Southern Plato Field (SPF).

=== Decommissioned ===
- 1.5-metre (59 in) Hexapod Telescope (HPT) was named for its unusual mount, consisting of six high-precision struts supporting a platform to which the telescope was attached. It was developed and tested by RUB in Germany, and moved to the observatory in 2006. Due to its peculiar design, the HPT was sheltered not inside a dome, but inside a pyramid, that would split into halves, exposing the telescope and enabling observations. The handling of the HPT proved to be extremely complex: six legs for pointing and tracking, six support legs for the control on the secondary mirror, and 36 piezo-actuators for the active primary mirror – all this kept two observers fully occupied during an observing night. The HPT was decommissioned in 2017, as it had accumulated several technical problems, and could not be repaired due to a lack of replacement parts.
- 25-centimetre (9.8 in) Berlin Exoplanet Search Telescope II (BEST II), installed by Prof. Dr. Heike Rauer from DLR Institute for Planetary Research, in November 2006, was dedicated to photometric measurements of stellar intensity variations, its prime use was robotic observational ground-based support of the COROT space mission to hunt for extra-solar transiting planets in the southern hemisphere. In the northern hemisphere, BEST I had already been working since 2001.
- The Bochum Monitoring Telescope (BMT) was a 41-centimetre (16 in) Newton reflector, known also as VYSOS 16, because it was used for the Variable Young Stellar Object Survey (VYSOS) in prominent Galactic star forming regions. It was equipped with a 3k x 2k CCD camera, with a field of view of 41' x 27'. It was installed in 2006, and decommissioned in 2020.
- The Robotic Bochum Twin Telescope (RoBoTT), known also as VYSOS 6, was a twin refractor, consisting of two 15-centimetre (5.9 in) refractors made by Takahashi Seisakusho on a common German equatorial mount. The first of the twin telescopes was installed in May 2008 in the eastern telescope room of the main building, and operated as a single telescope until August 2010, when a second telescope was installed at the same mount, transforming VYSOS 6 into a double system that allowed simultaneous observations in two filters. Both telescopes were equipped with 4k x 4k CCD cameras giving a field of view of about 2.5°. This twin refractor was moved into a new building in the most western part of the observatory.

=== Future Telescopes ===
A new 2.5-m telescope is under construction at ASA, while its foundations and the telescope pillar have already been erected at OCM. Subsequent construction phases are expected in 2024–2026.

There are also plans to build the Thirty Millimetre Telescope (TMMT), which will be the smallest telescope in the world, equipped with a professional infrared camera. Its purpose will be to observe the brightest stars in the sky, which are saturated by larger telescopes.

== Site ==
The observatory is located in the Atacama Desert about 120 kilometres (75 mi) south of the city of Antofagasta. Due to its harsh atmospheric conditions, such as dry air and extremely low rainfall, the Atacama Desert is the best place for astronomical observations in the world, providing over 330 starry nights per year.

OCM was built on a hill, named Cerro Murphy, located 1 kilometre (0.62 miles) to the southwest and approximately 230 metres (750 ft) below the summit of Cerro Armazones. Such proximity to the Armazones mountain makes OCM the most closely located astronomical facility to ESO's future Extremely Large Telescope (ELT), just after the Paranal Observatory, located 20 km to the west, where the ELT observations will be taking place. Due to their proximity to the ELT, OCM and Paranal share some facilities, like optic fibers for internet, roads, etc. About 10 km south-east of Paranal, there is a construction site for the southern part of the Cherenkov Telescope Array gamma-ray telescope (hosted by ESO).

== Impact on the environment ==
OCM embodies the philosophy of a "green" observatory, committing to minimize its environmental footprint. By design, OCM facilities were limited to a main building with two adjacent telescope rooms, and a compact auxiliary building for solar batteries and an emergency generator. The main building comprises two bedrooms with bathrooms, a social room, a kitchen, and a control room with a separate computer room; it is suitable for two observers who, in addition to observing, carry out all maintenance activities, including cleaning and meal preparations.

OCM is powered by solar panels, located on the main building's roof and the slopes of the hill. Solar energy is stored in batteries and used at night to carry out observations, and on cloudy days to maintain essential functions of the observatory, e.g. computers and servers, internet connectivity, water pump, heating, etc. OCM had also 3 wind turbines, which took advantage of strong winds, and provided additional source of energy at night and on cloudy days. In 2023, the wind turbines were replaced with a new array of solar panels, which, together with the existing solar panels, can meet the energy requirements of the expanded observatory.

== Contribution to science ==
The Hexapod-Telescope performed – among other projects – a high-resolution radial velocity spectroscopic survey of about 250 O- and 540 B-type stars in the southern Milky Way. It was found that the vast majority of stars (>82%) with masses above 16 solar masses form close binary systems.

VYSOS 6 conducted a multi-epoch r- and i-band survey of the southern galactic disk with the prime aim to find new, low-mass pre-main sequence stars and to monitor their light curves. This survey yielded light curves for 16 million stars including about 70,000 variables. Surprisingly, 62,000 of them were new detections, which means that almost 90% of variable objects in the Milky way were unknown before this survey. Part of the data were compiled into the largest astronomical image ever, covering 50 square degrees and consisting of 46 billion pixels with 196 GB (http://gds.astro.rub.de).

VYSOS 6 was also used in a pilot study of the photometric AGN reverberation mapping, showing that observations in broad+narrow bands can recover the emission line from photometric monitoring data as long as this emission line contributes 50% to the bandpass. These promising results encouraged a monitoring campaign of the local AGN 3C 120, which resulted in determining the size of the broad line region (BRL) and the luminosity of this AGN.

BEST II was used to conduct photometric observations of the CoRoT LRc2 field in 2007. From the acquired data containing about 100,000 stars, 426 new periodic variable stars were identified and 90% of them are located within the CoRoT exoplanetary CCD segments and may be of further interest for CoRoT additional science programs.

BEST II and IRIS were used in tandem to monitor in visual and near-infrared domains the Seyfert 1 galaxy WPVS48 and PGC 50427 to study these AGNs' dust distributions through the reverberation mapping.

Other near-infrared studies conducted with the IRIS telescope reported on new visual companions of solar-type stars within 25 pc. More recently, near-infrared observations of RR Lyrae variable stars and type II Cepheids in the Milky Way, carried out with IRIS by the members of the Araucaria Project, allowed to determine new period-luminosity and period-luminosity-metallicity relations for the RR Lyrae stars and, for the first time ever, period–luminosity relations for type II Cepheids. The period–luminosity relation is a canonical method to determine cosmic distances to galaxies and clusters hosting pulsating stars, and these new results refine the method, making it even more precise.

== See also ==
- The Araucaria Project
- Extremely Large Telescope
- Lists of telescopes
- List of astronomical observatories
- List of highest astronomical observatories
- Other observatories in Chile:
  - Llano de Chajnantor Observatory
  - Atacama Large Millimeter Array
  - Paranal Observatory
  - La Silla Observatory
  - Cerro Tololo Inter-American Observatory
