= List of highest astronomical observatories =

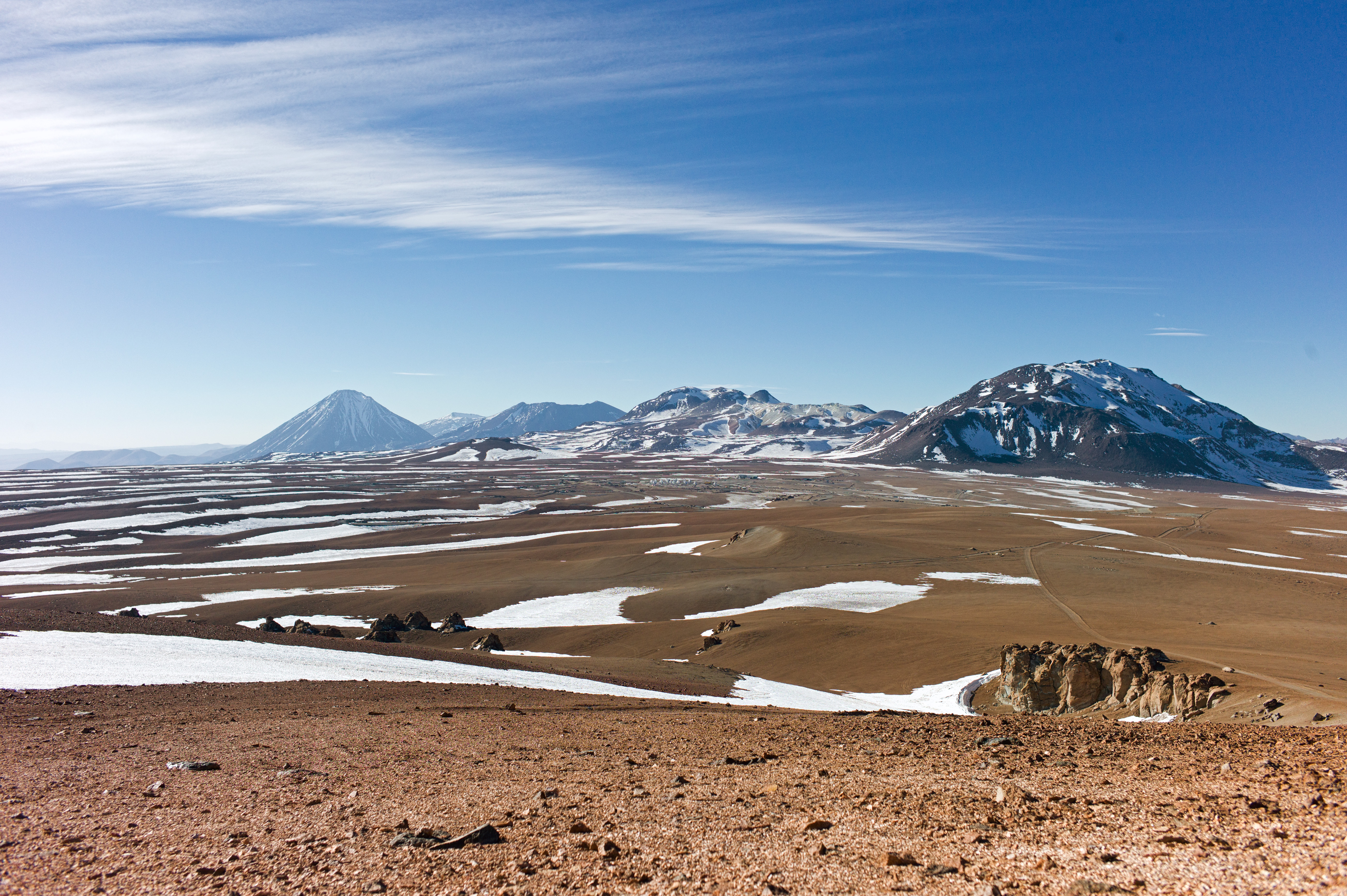
View showing several of the world's highest observatory sites in Chile, looking north across the Llano de Chajnantor and ALMA site, with the peaks of Cerro Toco (right center) and Cerro Chajnantor (right) rising above.

This is a list of the highest astronomical observatories in the world, considering only ground-based observatories and ordered by elevation above mean sea level. The main list includes only permanent observatories with facilities constructed at a fixed location, followed by a supplementary list for temporary observatories such as transportable telescopes or instrument packages. For large observatories with numerous telescopes at a single location, only a single entry is included listing the main elevation of the observatory or of the highest operational instrument if that information is available.

== History of high altitude astronomical observatories ==
Prior to the late 19th century, almost all astronomical observatories throughout history were located at modest elevations, often close to cities and educational institutions for the simple reason of convenience. The British physicist and mathematician Isaac Newton is credited with the realization that high-altitude sites are superior for observation because they provide the "most serene and quiet Air" above the dense, turbulent atmosphere ("grosser Clouds"), thereby reducing star twinkling.

As air pollution from industrialization and light pollution from artificial lighting increased during the Industrial Revolution, astronomers sought observatory sites in remote locations with clear and dark skies, naturally drawing them towards the mountains. The first permanent mountaintop astronomical observatory was the Lick Observatory constructed from 1876 to 1887, at the modest elevation of 1,283 m (4,209 ft) atop Mount Hamilton in California. The first high altitude observatory was constructed atop the 2,877 m (9,439 ft) Pic du Midi de Bigorre in the French Pyrenees starting in 1878, with its first telescope and dome installed in 1904. Astronomical observations were also made from Mont Blanc in the late 1800s.

A few other high altitude observatories (such as the Lowell Observatory in Arizona and Sphinx Observatory in Switzerland) were constructed through the first half of the 20th century. However, the two most important and prominent of the early 20th century observatories, Mount Wilson Observatory and Palomar Observatory, were both located on mid-elevation mountaintops of about 1,700 m (5,600 ft) in southern California. The stunning successes and discoveries made there using the world's largest telescopes, the 100-inch Hooker Telescope and 200-inch Hale Telescope, spurred the move to ever higher sites for the new generation of observatories and telescopes after World War II, along with a worldwide search for locations which had the best astronomical seeing.

Since the mid-20th century, an increasing number of high altitude observatory sites have been developed at locations around the world, including numerous sites in Arizona, Hawaii, Chile, and the Canary Islands. The initial wave of high-altitude sites were mostly in the 2,000–2,500 m (6,600–8,200 ft) range, but astronomers soon sought even higher sites above 3,000 m (9,800 ft). Among the largest, best developed, and most renowned of these high altitude sites is the Mauna Kea Observatory located near the summit of a 4,205 m (13,796 ft) volcano on the Island of Hawaii, which has grown to include over a dozen major telescopes during the four decades since it was founded. In the first decade of the 21st century, there has been a new wave of observatory construction at very high altitudes above 4,500 m (14,800 ft), with such observatories constructed in India, Mexico, and most notably the Atacama Desert in northern Chile, now the site of several of the world's highest observatories. The scientific benefits of these sites outweigh the numerous logistical and physiological challenges which must be overcome during the construction and operation of observatories in remote mountain locations, even in desert, polar, and tropical island sites which magnify the challenges but confer additional observational advantages.

Sites at high altitude are ideal for optical astronomy and provide optimal seeing, being above a significant portion of the Earth's atmosphere with its associated weather, turbulence, and diminished clarity. In particular, sites on mountaintops within about 80 km (50 mi) of the ocean often have excellent observing conditions above a stable inversion layer throughout much of the year. High altitude sites are also above most of atmosphere's water vapor, making them ideal for infrared astronomy and submillimeter astronomy as those wavelengths are strongly absorbed by water vapor. On the other hand, high altitude does not offer as significant an advantage for radio astronomy at longer wavelengths, so relatively few radio telescopes are located at such sites. At the far end of the spectrum, for the extremely short wavelengths of x-ray and gamma ray astronomy, along with high-energy cosmic rays, high altitude observations once again offers significant advantages, enough that many experiments at these wavelengths have been conducted by balloon-borne or even by space telescopes, although a number of high-altitude ground-based sites have also been used. These include the Chacaltaya Astrophysical Observatory in Bolivia, which at 5,230 m (17,160 ft) was the world's highest permanent astronomical observatory from the time of its construction during the 1940s until surpassed in 2009 by the new University of Tokyo Atacama Observatory, an optical-infrared telescope on a remote 5,640 m (18,500 ft) mountaintop in Chile.

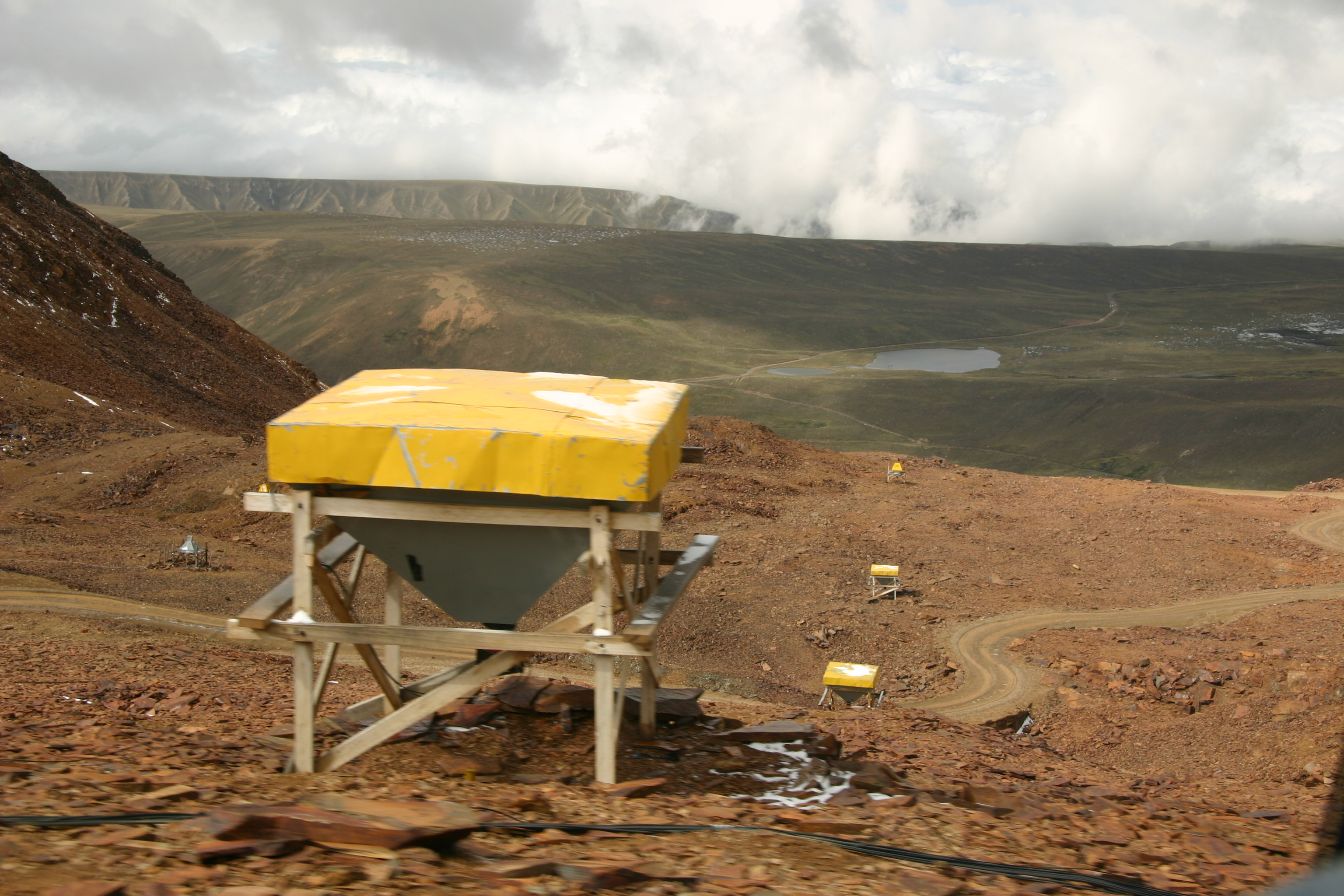
Particle detector at Chacaltaya Astrophysical Observatory, the highest permanent astronomical observatory in the world from the 1940s through 2009.

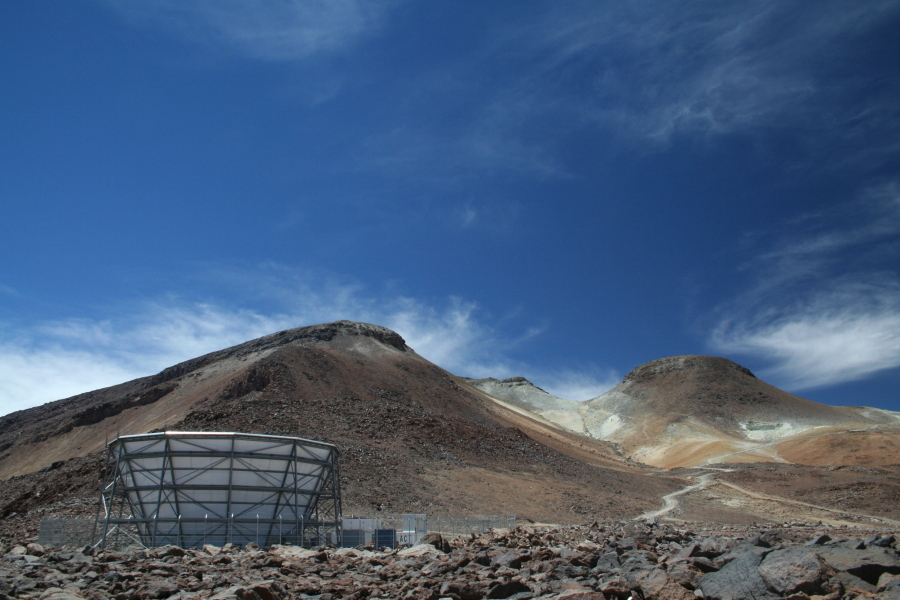
Atacama Cosmology Telescope on Cerro Toco, just north of the Llano de Chajnantor.

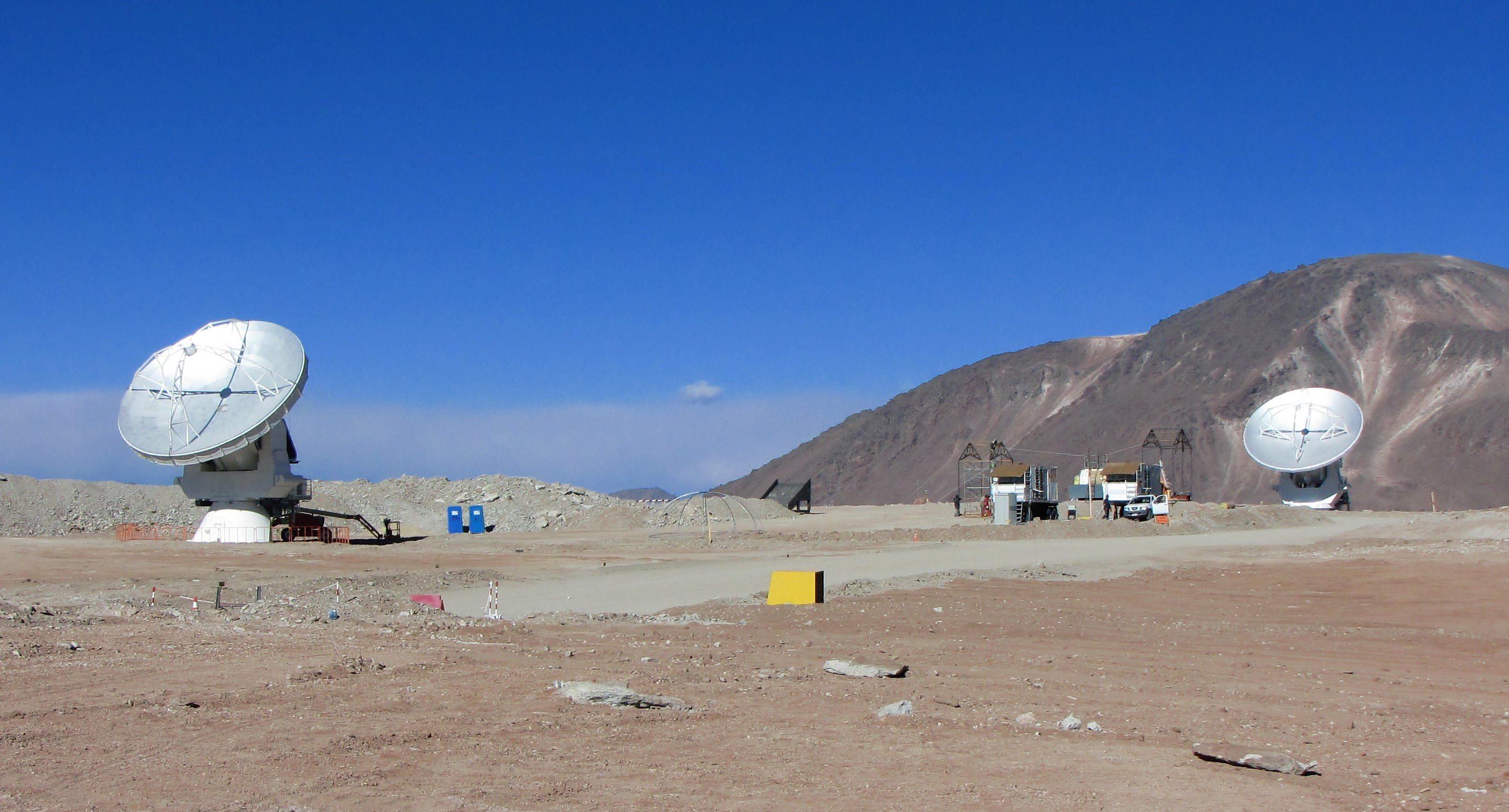
View looking northeast across the Llano de Chajnantor and the first two ALMA antennas in late 2009, with Cerro Chajnantor rising above at right.

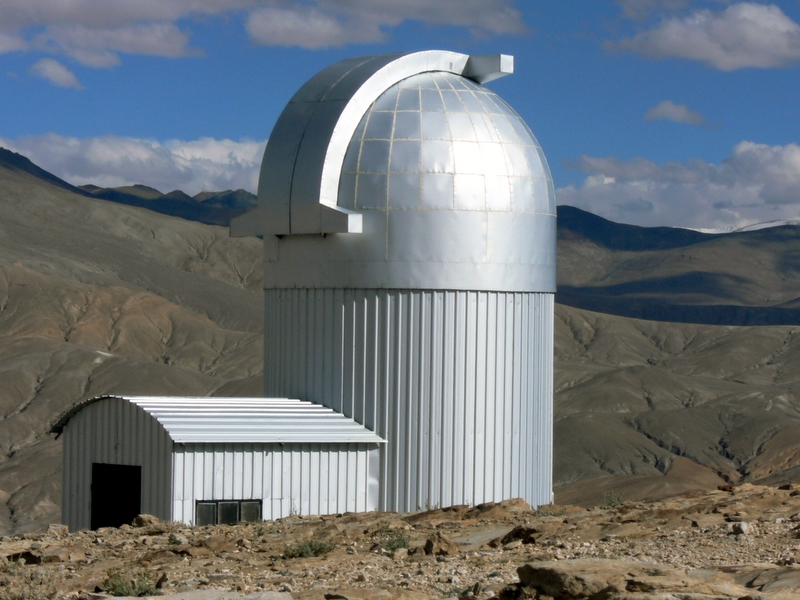
The Indian Astronomical Observatory stands at an altitude of 4,500 m (14,800 ft) on Mount Saraswati in Ladakh, India.

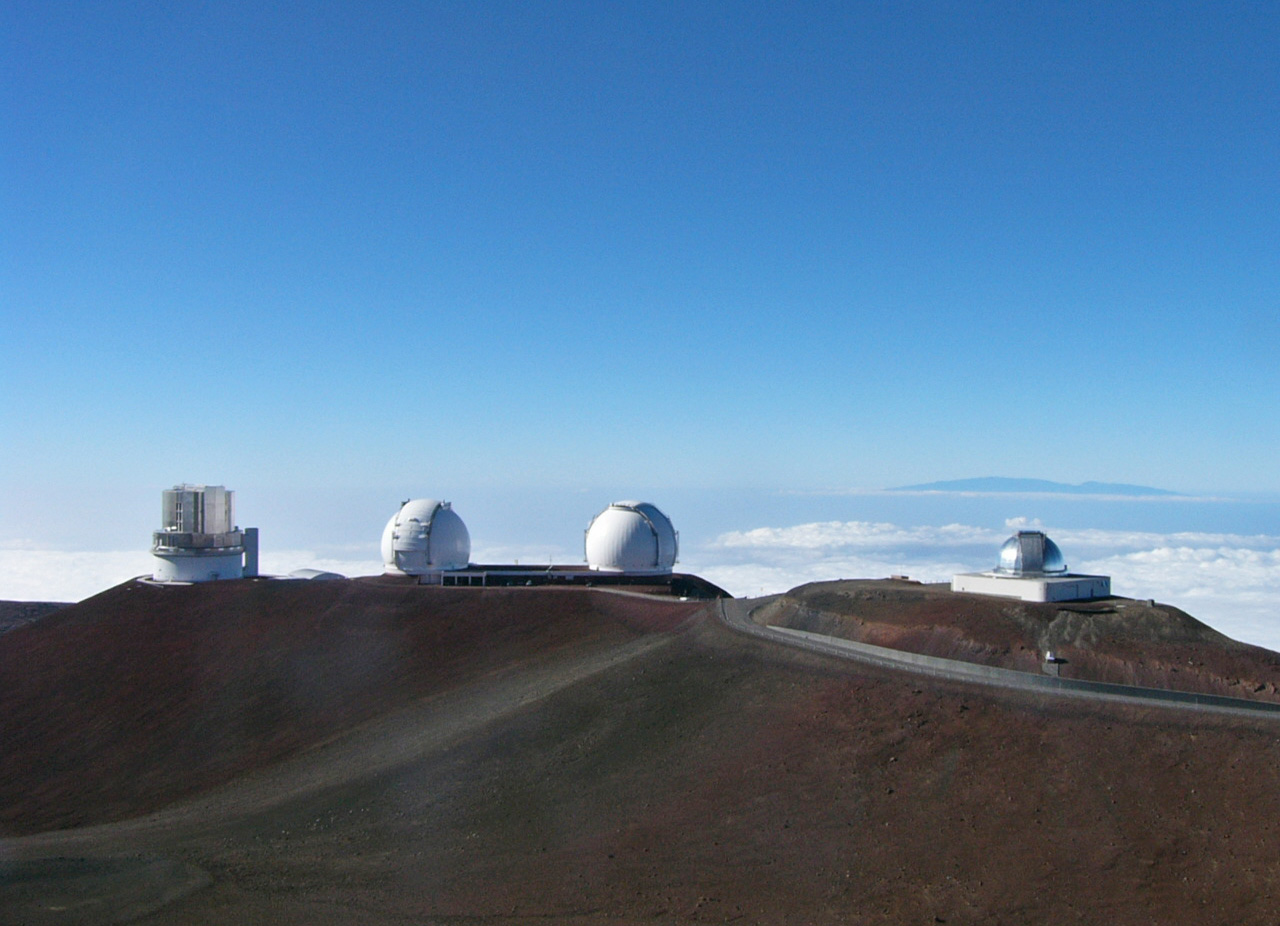
Aerial view of part of the Mauna Kea Observatory, showing Subaru, Keck, and IRTF telescopes (left to right).

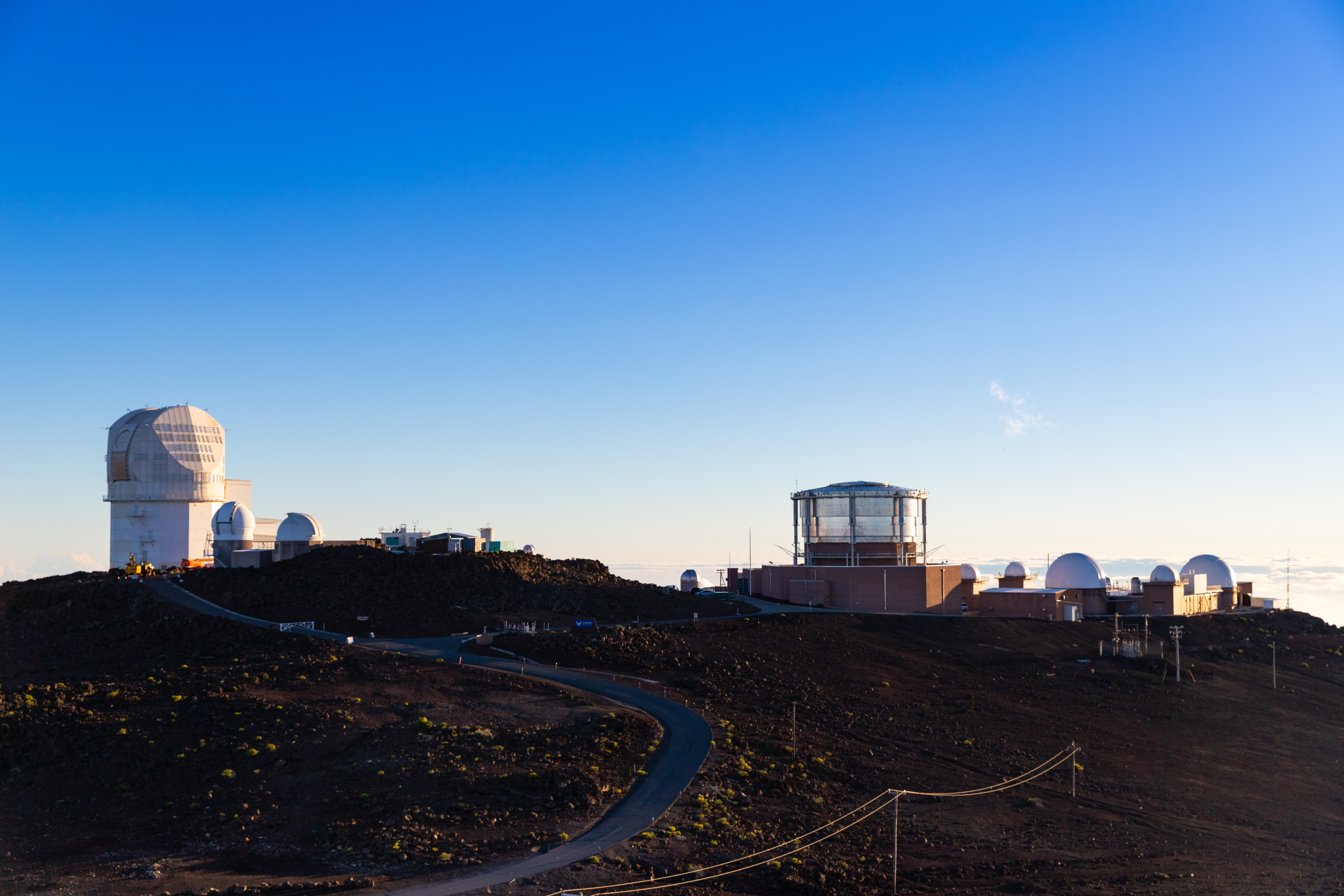
Haleakala Observatory at 3,036 m (9,961 ft), Maui, Hawaii

== Highest permanent observatories ==
Permanent observatories above 3,000 m:

Observatory Name	Elevation	Observatory Site	Location	Coordinates	Established	Type of Observatory	Major Instruments
University of Tokyo Atacama Observatory (TAO)	5,640 m (18,500 ft)	Cerro Chajnantor	Atacama Desert, Chile	22°59′12″S 67°44′32″W	2009	Optical, infrared	
The CCAT Observatory/ Fred Young Submillimeter Telescope (FYST)	5,612 m (18,412 ft)	Cerro Chajnantor	Atacama Desert, Chile	22°59′9″S 67°44′25″W	2020	Submillimeter, Millimeter wave	
Ali CMB Polarization Telescope (AliCPT)	5,250 m (17,220 ft)	Shiquanhe, Ngari Plateau	Tibet Autonomous Region, China	32°18′38″N 80°01′50″E	2025	Microwave	
Chacaltaya Astrophysical Observatory	5,230 m (17,160 ft)	Chacaltaya	Andes, Bolivia	16°21′12″S 68°07′53″W	1946	Cosmic ray, gamma ray	
James Ax Observatory	5,200 m (17,100 ft)	Cerro Toco	Atacama Desert, Chile	22°57′30″S 67°47′10″W	2011	Microwave	POLARBEAR
Simons Observatory	5,190 m (17,030 ft)	Cerro Toco	Atacama Desert, Chile	22°57′31″S 67°47′16″W	2007	Microwave	Large Aperture Telescope and multiple Small Aperture Telescopes. Former site of the Atacama Cosmology Telescope.
Llano de Chajnantor Observatory	5,104 m (16,745 ft)	Llano de Chajnantor	Atacama Desert, Chile	23°01′22″S 67°45′17″W	1999	Millimeter wave, submillimeter	ALMA, APEX, QUIET
Shiquanhe Observatory (NAOC Ali Observatory)	5,100 m (16,700 ft)	Shiquanhe, Ngari Plateau	Tibet Autonomous Region, China	32°19′31″N 80°01′36″E	2011	Optical	
Large Latin American Millimeter Array (LLAMA)	4,825 m (15,830 ft)	Alto de Chorillos	Salta, Argentina	24°11′31″S 66°28′29″W	Under construction	Submillimeter	LLAMA, QUBIC
Llano de Chajnantor Observatory	4,800 m (15,700 ft)	Pampa La Bola	Atacama Desert, Chile	22°58′17″S 67°42′10″W	2002	Submillimeter	ASTE, NANTEN2
Large Millimeter Telescope Alfonso Serrano	4,580 m (15,030 ft)	Sierra Negra	Puebla, Mexico	18°59′06″N 97°18′53″W	2006	Microwave	
Indian Astronomical Observatory	4,500 m (14,800 ft)	Mount Saraswati	Hanle, Ladakh, India	32°46′46″N 78°57′51″E	2001	Infrared, gamma ray, Optical	Himalayan Chandra Telescope, HAGAR
Meyer–Womble Observatory	4,312 m (14,147 ft)	Mount Blue Sky	Colorado, United States	39°35′12″N 105°38′24″W	1996	Optical, Infrared	
Yangbajing International Cosmic Ray Observatory	4,300 m (14,100 ft)	Yangbajain	Tibet Autonomous Region, China	30°05′N 90°33′E	1990	Cosmic ray	
Mauna Kea Observatory	4,190 m (13,750 ft)	Mauna Kea	Hawaii, United States	19°49′28″N 155°28′24″W	1967	Optical, infrared, submillimeter	Keck, UKIRT, Gemini North, Subaru, JCMT, CSO, SMA, CFHT
High Altitude Water Cherenkov (HAWC) Gamma-Ray Observatory	4,100 m (13,500 ft)	Sierra Negra	Puebla, Mexico	18°59′40″N 97°18′33″W	2013	Gamma ray	
Barcroft Observatory	3,890 m (12,760 ft)	White Mountain Peak	California, United States	37°35′19″N 118°14′31″W	1976	Infrared, millimeter wave	
Very Long Baseline Array (VLBA), Mauna Kea Site	3,730 m (12,240 ft)	Mauna Kea	Hawaii, United States	19°48′05″N 155°27′20″W	1986	Radio telescope	
Llano del Hato National Astronomical Observatory	3,600 m (11,800 ft)	Llano del Hato	Andes, Venezuela	8°47′11″N 70°52′19″W	1970s	Optical telescope	1-m Askania Schmidt camera, a 65-cm Zeiss refractor, a 1-m Zeiss reflector and a 50-cm Askania double astrograph
Iranian National Observatory	3,600 m (11,800 ft)	Mount Gargash	Isfahan, Iran	33°40′27″N 51°19′07″E	2010s	Optical telescope	Under Construction
Sphinx Observatory	3,571 m (11,716 ft)	Jungfraujoch	Bernese Alps, Switzerland	46°32′51″N 7°59′6″E	1937	Optical telescope	
Mauna Loa Observatory	3,394 m (11,135 ft)	Mauna Loa	Hawaii, United States	19°32′10″N 155°34′34″W	1957	Optical, millimeter wave	Mauna Loa Solar Observatory, AMiBA
Observatorio Astronómico de Moquegua	3,305 m (10,843 ft)	Cambrune	Moquegua, Peru	16°49′41.25″S 70°40′42.57″W	2022	Optical	1 m optical telescope in Astroshell dome
Magdalena Ridge Observatory	3,230 m (10,600 ft)	South Baldy	New Mexico, United States	33°58′36″N 107°11′05″W	1999	Optical, infrared	
Mount Graham International Observatory	3,191 m (10,469 ft)	Mount Graham	Arizona, United States	32°42′05″N 109°53′31″W	1993	Optical, submillimeter	LBT, HHST, VATT
Gornergrat Observatory	3,135 m (10,285 ft)	Gornergrat	Pennine Alps, Switzerland	45°59′04″N 7°47′09″E	1967	Infrared, submillimeter	Gornergrat Infrared Telescope, KOSMA
Peak Terskol Observatory	3,127 m (10,259 ft)	Peak Terskol	North Caucasus, Russia	43°16′29″N 42°30′03″E	1980	Optical	2-m Ritchey-Chretien-Coude Zeiss since 1995, 60-cm Zeiss reflector
European Extremely Large Telescope	3,060 m (10,040 ft)	Cerro Armazones	Atacama Desert, Chile	24°35′20″S 70°11′32″W	Under construction	Optical, near infrared	
Haleakala Observatory	3,036 m (9,961 ft)	Haleakala	Hawaii, United States	20°42′30″N 156°15′27″W	1964	Optical, millimeter wave	Pan-STARRS, LCOGT Faulkes Telescope North, AEOS
Notre Dame University–Louaize Observatory	3,073 m (10,082 ft)	Mount Lebanon	Peak Al-Znanir, Lebanon	34°15′1.538″N 36°0′38.021″E	Not completed	Optical telescope	Under Construction

== Highest temporary observatories ==
Temporary observatories above 3,000 m:

Observatory Name	Elevation	Observatory Site	Location	Coordinates	Established	Type of Observatory	Major Instruments
Receiver Lab Telescope	5,525 m (18,127 ft)	Cerro Sairecabur	Atacama Desert, Chile	22°43′0″S 67°53′30″W	2002	Submillimeter, 1–2 THz	
PLATO (PLATeau Observatory)	4,091 m (13,422 ft)	Dome A	East Antarctic Ice Sheet, Antarctica	80°22′S 77°21′E	2008	Optical, submillimeter	
Concordia Station	3,233 m (10,607 ft)	Dome C	East Antarctic Ice Sheet, Antarctica	75°06′S 123°20′E	2005	Optical, infrared, submillimeter	

== Other important high altitude observatories ==
This is a selected list of the most important and notable high altitude observatories between 1700 and 3000 m; it is not intended to list all of the numerous observatories worldwide in this elevation range:

Observatory Name	Elevation	Observatory Site	Location	Coordinates	Established	Type of Observatory	Major Instruments
Sierra Nevada Observatory	2,896 m (9,501 ft)	Sierra Nevada	Granada, Spain	37°03′51″N 03°23′05″W	1981	Optical	
Pic du Midi Observatory	2,877 m (9,439 ft)	Pic du Midi de Bigorre	Pyrenees, France	42°56′11″N 00°08′34″E	1878	Optical, solar	Bernard Lyot Telescope
Amundsen-Scott South Pole Station / Martin A. Pomerantz Observatory	2,835 m (9,301 ft)	South Pole	East Antarctic Ice Sheet, Antarctica	89°59.9′S 0°00′E	1994	Microwave, millimeter, neutrino, submillimeter	SPT, AMANDA, IceCube, QUaD
Cerro Armazones Observatory	2,817 m (9,242 ft)	Cerro Armazones	Atacama Desert, Chile	24°35′54″S 70°12′04″W	1995	Optical telescope	Hexapod-Telescope
National Astronomical Observatory (Mexico)	2,800 m (9,200 ft)	Sierra de San Pedro Mártir	Baja California, Mexico	31°02′39″N 115°27′49″W	1967	Optical telescope	
Apache Point Observatory	2,788 m (9,147 ft)	Sacramento Peak	New Mexico, United States	32°46′49″N 105°49′13″W	1984	Optical, solar	SDSS, Dunn Solar Telescope
Cerro Pachón	2,722 m (8,930 ft)	Cerro Pachón	Atacama Desert, Chile	30°14′27″S 70°44′12″W	2000	Optical, infrared	Gemini South, SOAR
National Astronomical Observatory (Colombia)	2,640 m (8,660 ft)	Metropolitan Area of Bogotá	Bogotá, Colombia	04°35′46″N 74°04′39″W	1803	Optical telescope	
Paranal Observatory	2,635 m (8,645 ft)	Cerro Paranal	Atacama Desert, Chile	24°37′38″S 70°24′15″W	1999	Optical, infrared	VLT, VISTA
Fred Lawrence Whipple Observatory	2,606 m (8,550 ft)	Mount Hopkins	Arizona, United States	31°40′52″N 110°52′42″W	1966	Optical, gamma ray	MMT, VERITAS
Devasthal Observatory	2,450 m (8,040 ft)	Devasthal	Nainital, Uttarakhand, India	29°21′42″N 79°41′06″E	1998	Optical	3.6m Devasthal Optical Telescope
Roque de los Muchachos Observatory	2,396 m (7,861 ft)	Roque de los Muchachos	La Palma, Canary Islands	28°46′N 17°53′W	1979	Optical, infrared, solar, gamma ray	MAGIC, GTC, WHT, TNG, NOT, INT
Teide Observatory	2,390 m (7,840 ft)	Pico del Teide	Tenerife, Canary Islands	28°18′00″N 16°30′35″W	1964	Optical, solar, microwave	VTT, BRT, OGS, VSA
La Silla Observatory	2,380 m (7,810 ft)	La Silla	Atacama Desert, Chile	29°15′15″S 70°44′22″W	1969	Optical telescope	NTT, ESO
Las Campanas Observatory	2,380 m (7,810 ft)	Cerro Las Campanas	Atacama Desert, Chile	29°00′54″S 70°41′32″W	1971	Optical telescope	Magellan Telescopes, GMT
Lowell Observatory	2,210 m (7,250 ft)	Flagstaff	Arizona, United States	35°12′10″N 111°39′52″W	1894	Optical telescope	
Cerro Tololo Inter-American Observatory	2,200 m (7,200 ft)	Cerro Tololo	Atacama Desert, Chile	30°10′9″S 70°48′21″W	1967	Optical telescope	Victor M. Blanco Telescope
Calar Alto Observatory	2,168 m (7,113 ft)	Calar Alto	Almería, Spain	37°13′25″N 2°32′46″W	1975	Optical telescope	
Very Large Array	2,124 m (6,969 ft)	Plains of San Agustin	New Mexico, United States	34°04′43″N 107°37′06″W	1975	Radio telescope	
Kitt Peak National Observatory	2,096 m (6,877 ft)	Kitt Peak	Arizona, United States	31°57′30″N 111°35′48″W	1960	Optical, solar, radio telescope	Mayall, WIYN, McMath-Pierce, VLBA
Special Astrophysical Observatory of the Russian Academy of Science	2,070 m (6,790 ft)	Mount Pastukhov	Caucasus Mountains, Russia	43°38′49″N 41°26′26″E	1966	Optical telescope	BTA-6
Yunnan Astronomical Observatory	2,014 m (6,608 ft)	rural Kunming, Yunnan, China	rural Kunming, Yunnan, China	25°02′00″N 102°47′00″E	1972	Optical telescope, Radio, Solar, Infrared	Lijiang 2.4m telescope, Fuxian Lake 1m solar tower, ynao 1m telescope, 10m radio telescope.
Mount Wilson Observatory	1,742 m (5,715 ft)	Mount Wilson	California, United States	34°13′26″N 118°03′42″W	1908	Optical, solar	Hale Telescope (60"), Hooker Telescope (100")
Palomar Observatory	1,712 m (5,617 ft)	Palomar Mountain	California, United States	33°21′21″N 116°51′50″W	1936	Optical telescope	Hale Telescope (200"), Samuel Oschin telescope

== See also ==
- List of telescope types
- Lists of telescopes
- List of astronomical observatories
- Observational astronomy
