= Cerro Armazones =

Mountain in Chile

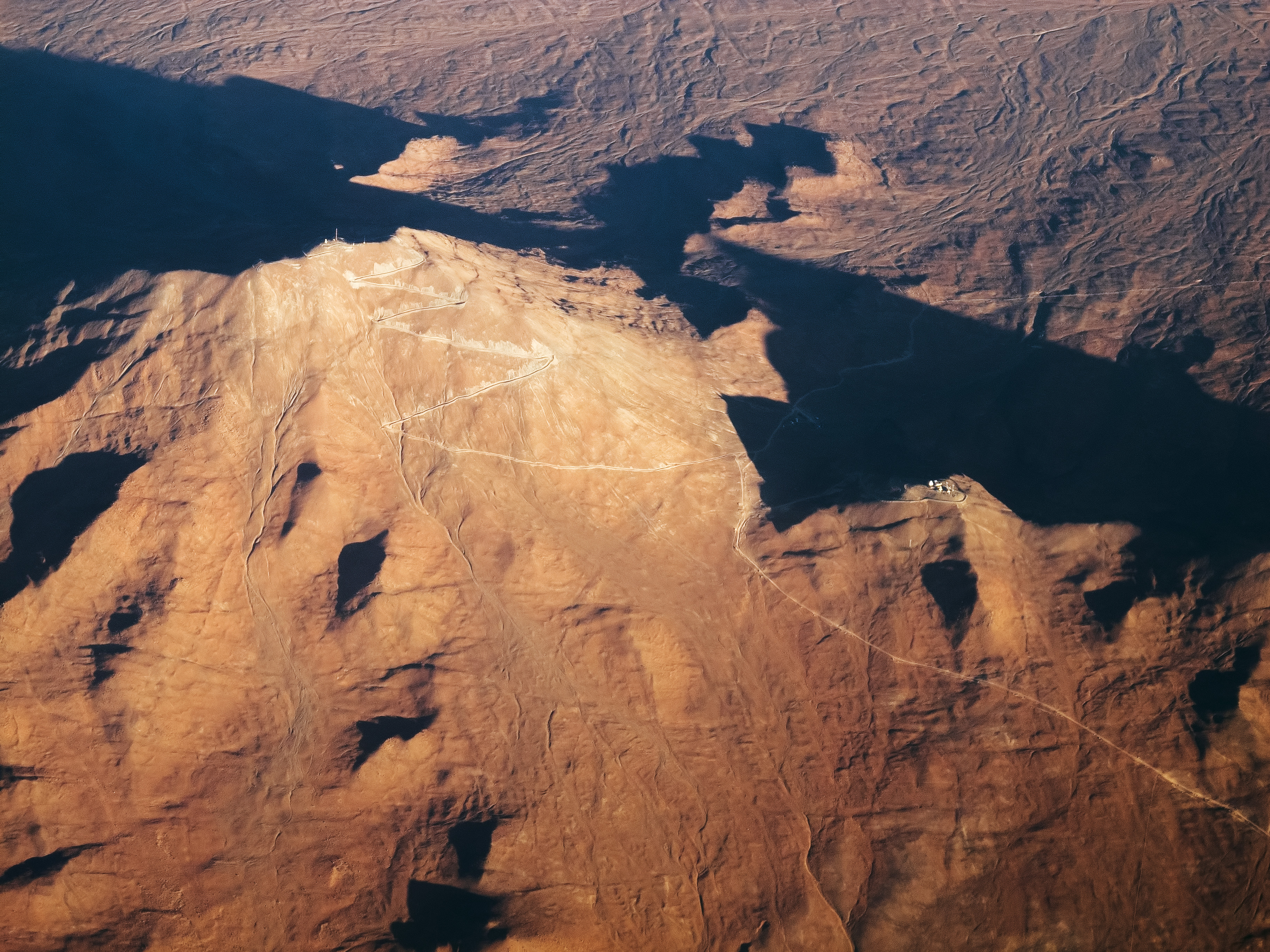
- Aerial view of the Cerro Armazones

Highest point
- Elevation: 3,046 m (9,993 ft)
- Coordinates: 24°35′21″S 70°11′32″W

Geography
- Location within Chile
- Location: Antofagasta Region, Chile
- Parent range: Cordillera Vicuña Mackenna

Cerro Armazones is a mountain located in the Sierra Vicuña Mackenna of the Chilean Coast Range of the Andes, approximately 105 km (65 mi) southeast of Antofagasta in the Antofagasta Region, Chile. The mountain is situated in an ideal location for optical astronomy due to its 89% cloudless nights annually. On 26 April 2010, the European Southern Observatory Council selected Cerro Armazones as the site for the planned Extremely Large Telescope (ELT); construction commenced in June 2014. The first light observation is scheduled for 2027.

Prior to ELT construction, Cerro Armazones had an elevation of 3,064 metres (10,052 ft), but the resulting plateau now stands several meters lower after the summit was truncated during construction.

Situated on a neighbouring hill approximately 1 km (1 mi) to the southwest and 230 m (755 ft) below Cerro Armazones lies the Polish Cerro Murphy Observatory, operated by the Nicolaus Copernicus Astronomical Center of the Polish Academy of Sciences in Warsaw. Observations are conducted by the Araucaria Project.

== Gallery ==
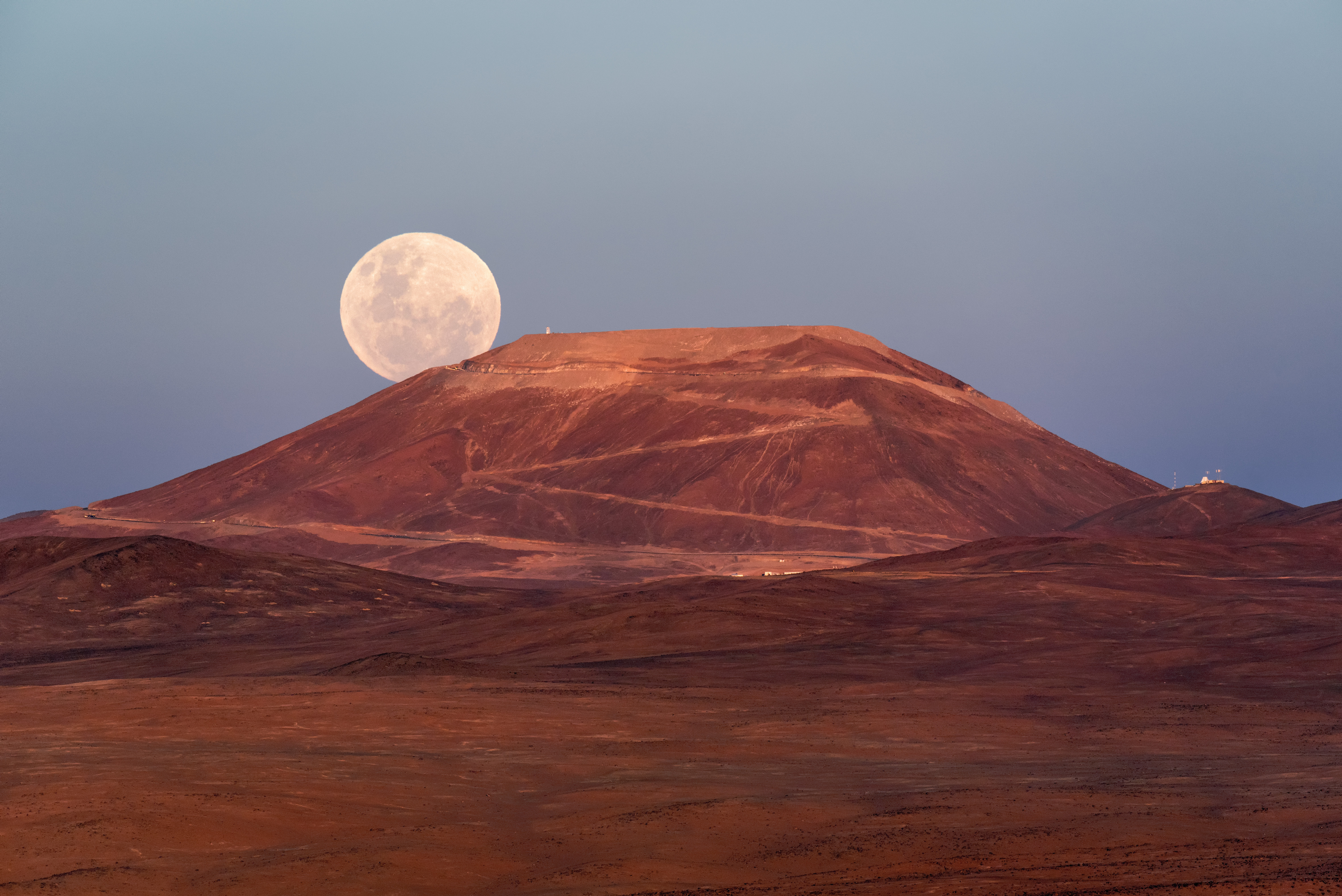
Supermoon rising up from behind Cerro Armazones.

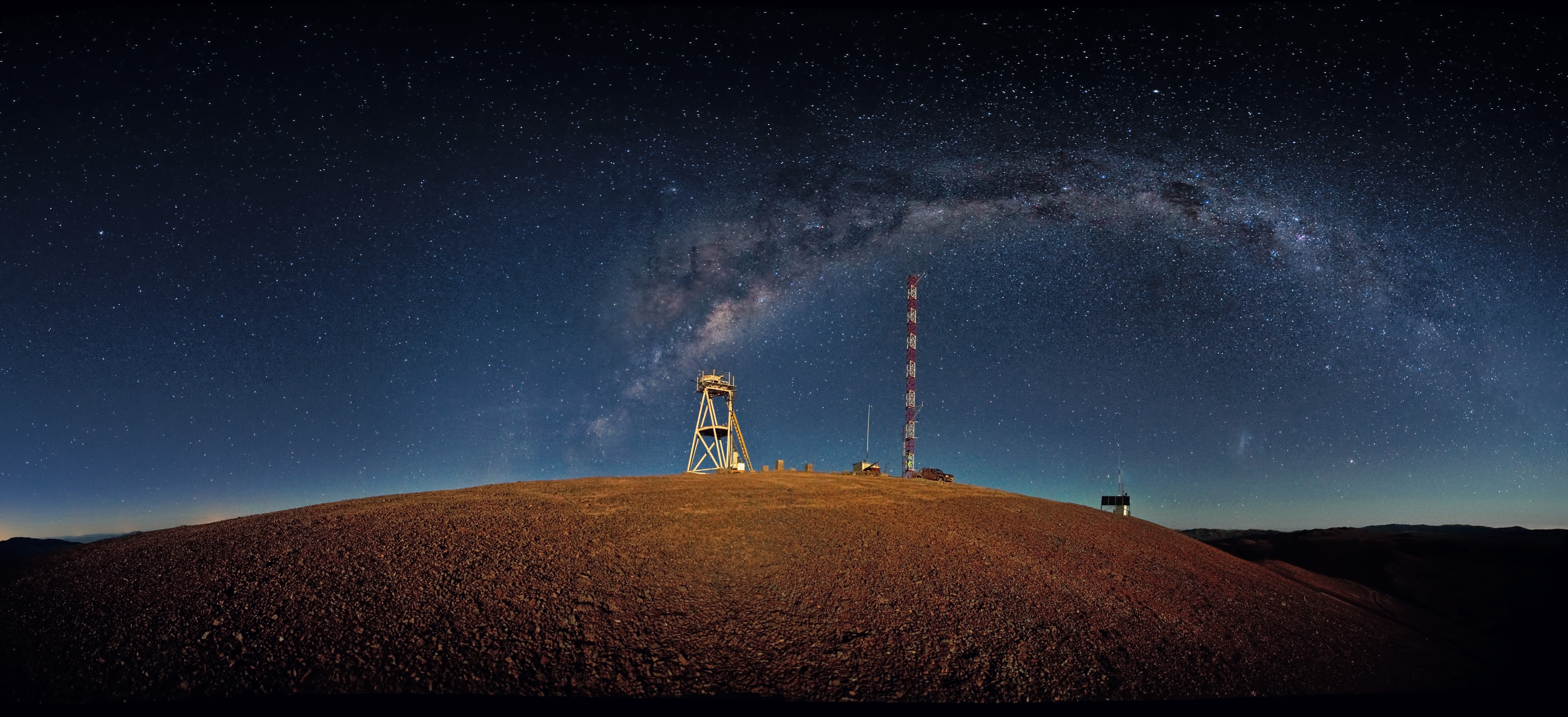
Night-time panorama of Cerro Armazones

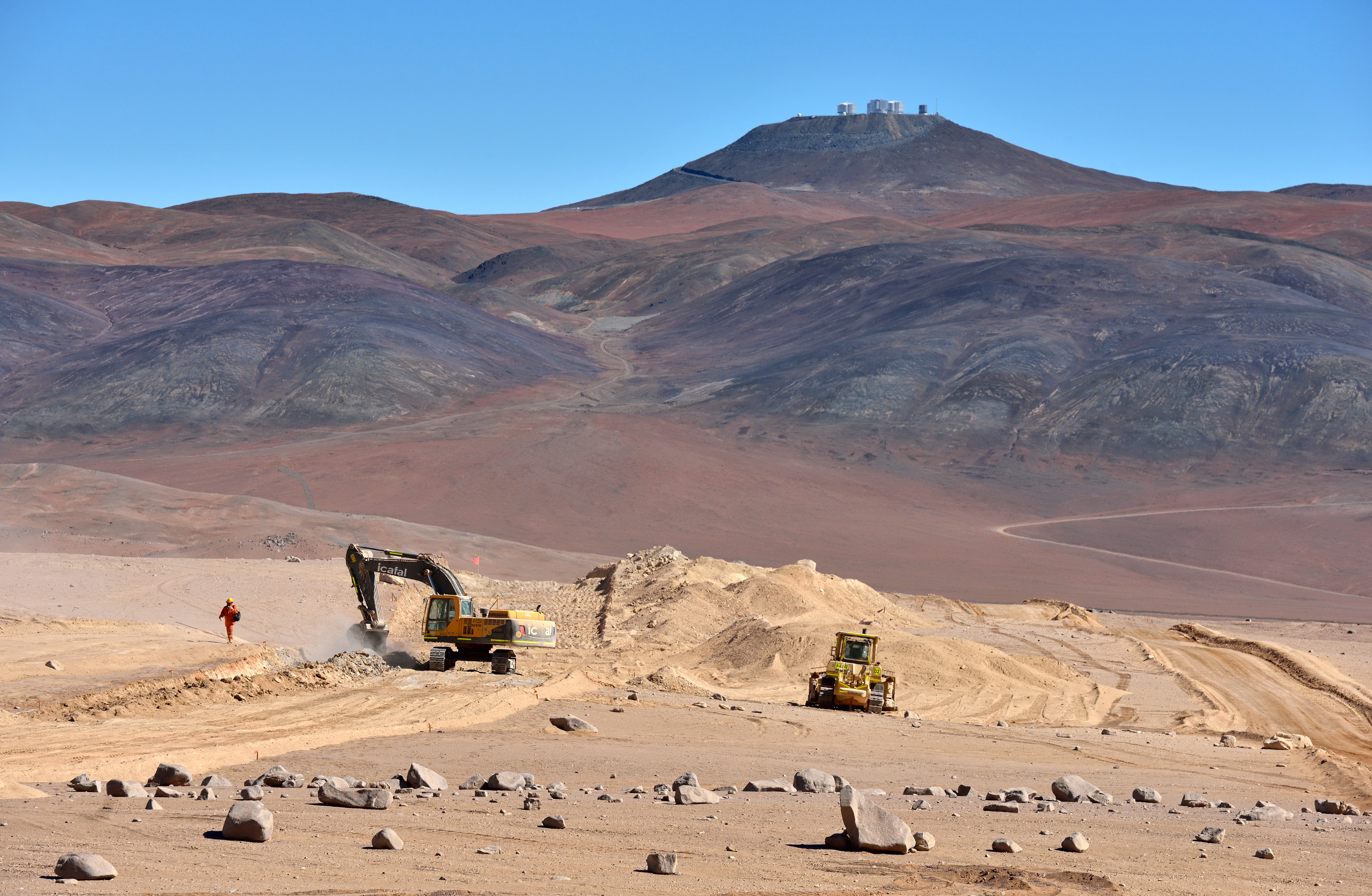
Carving a route to Armazones, with Cerro Paranal and the Very Large Telescope in the background.

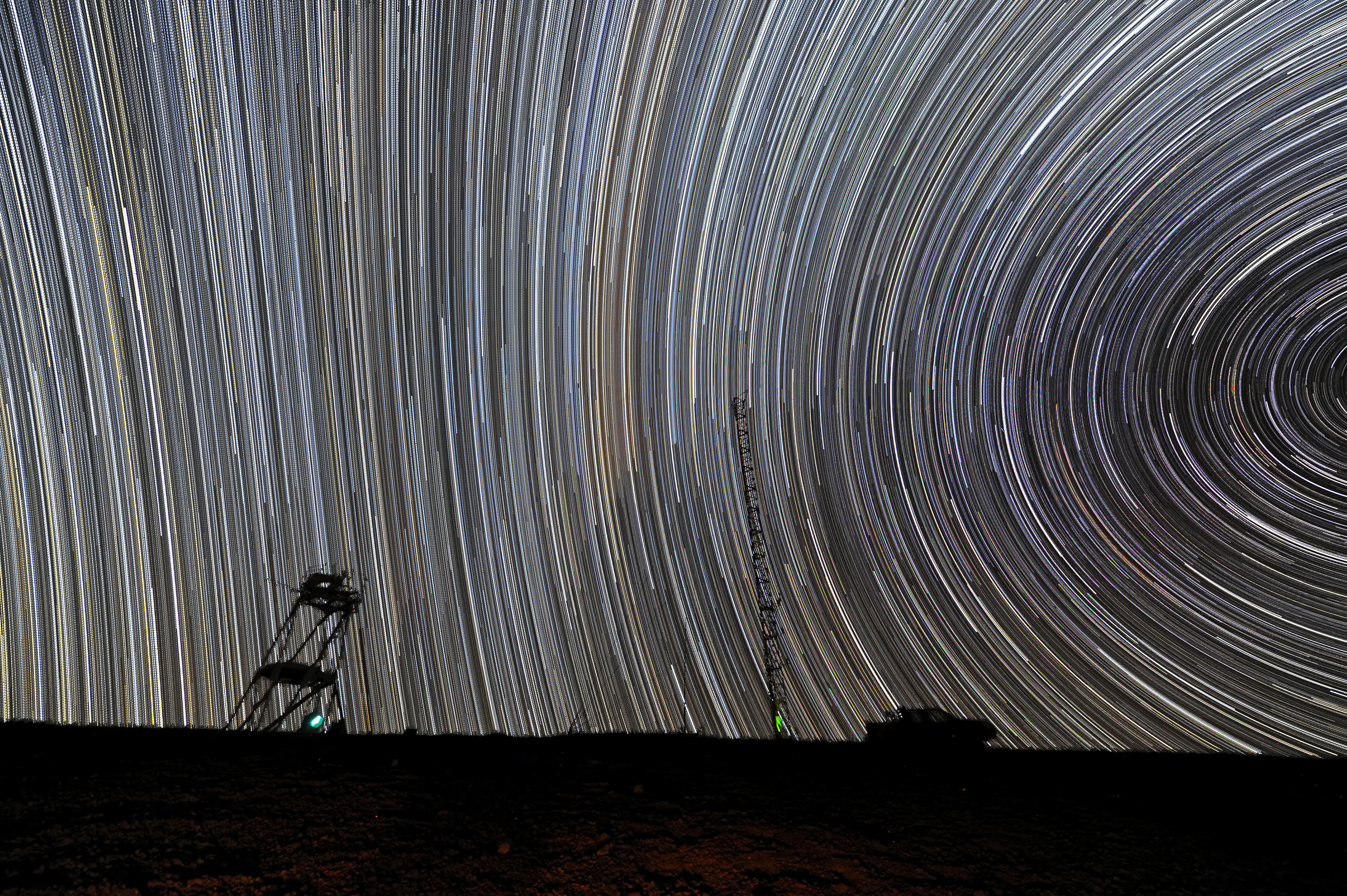
Result of the apparent motion of the stars through the southern sky.

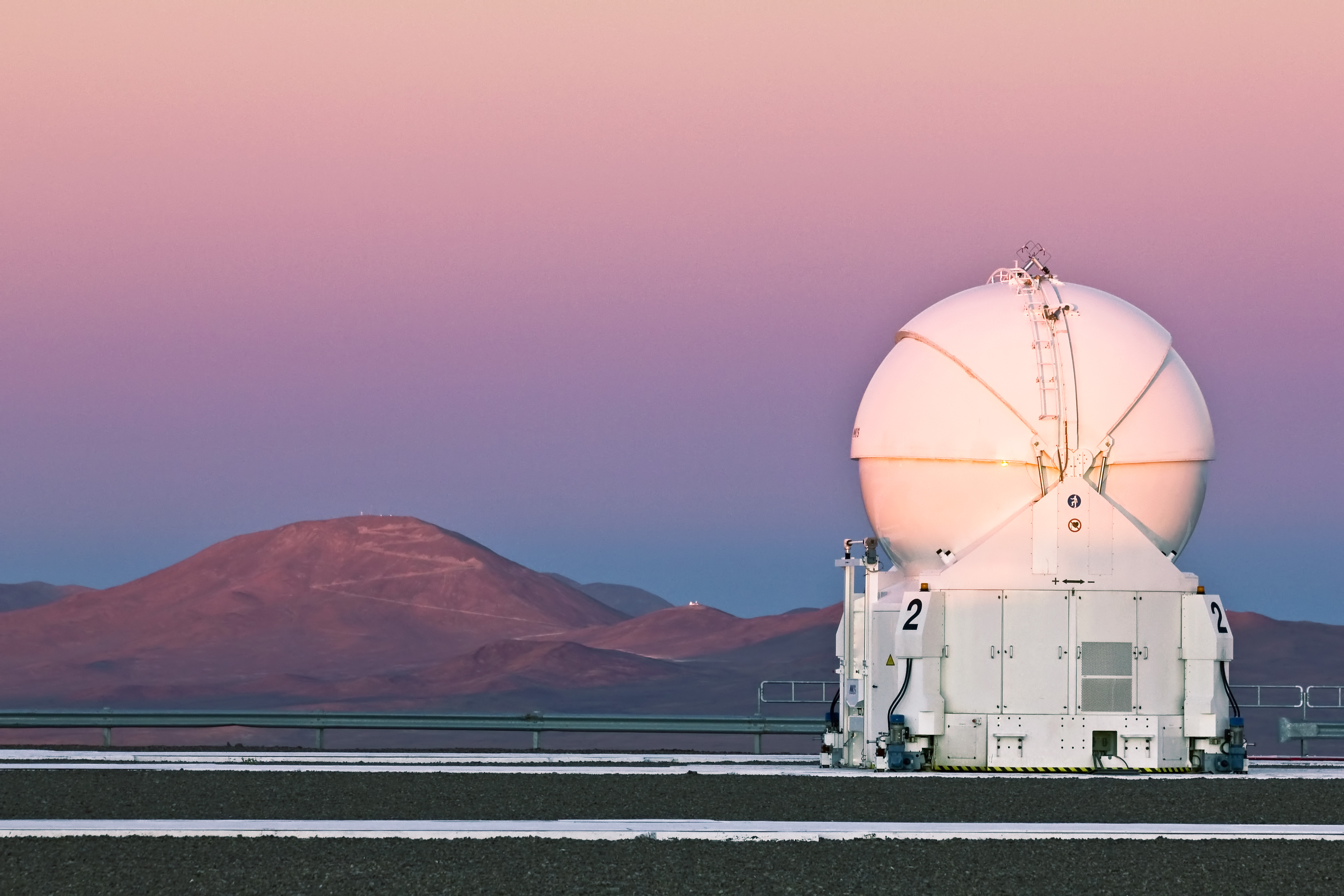
VLT's Auxiliary Telescope (AT) 2 with Cerro Armazones in the background. Credit: ESO/G. Lombardi

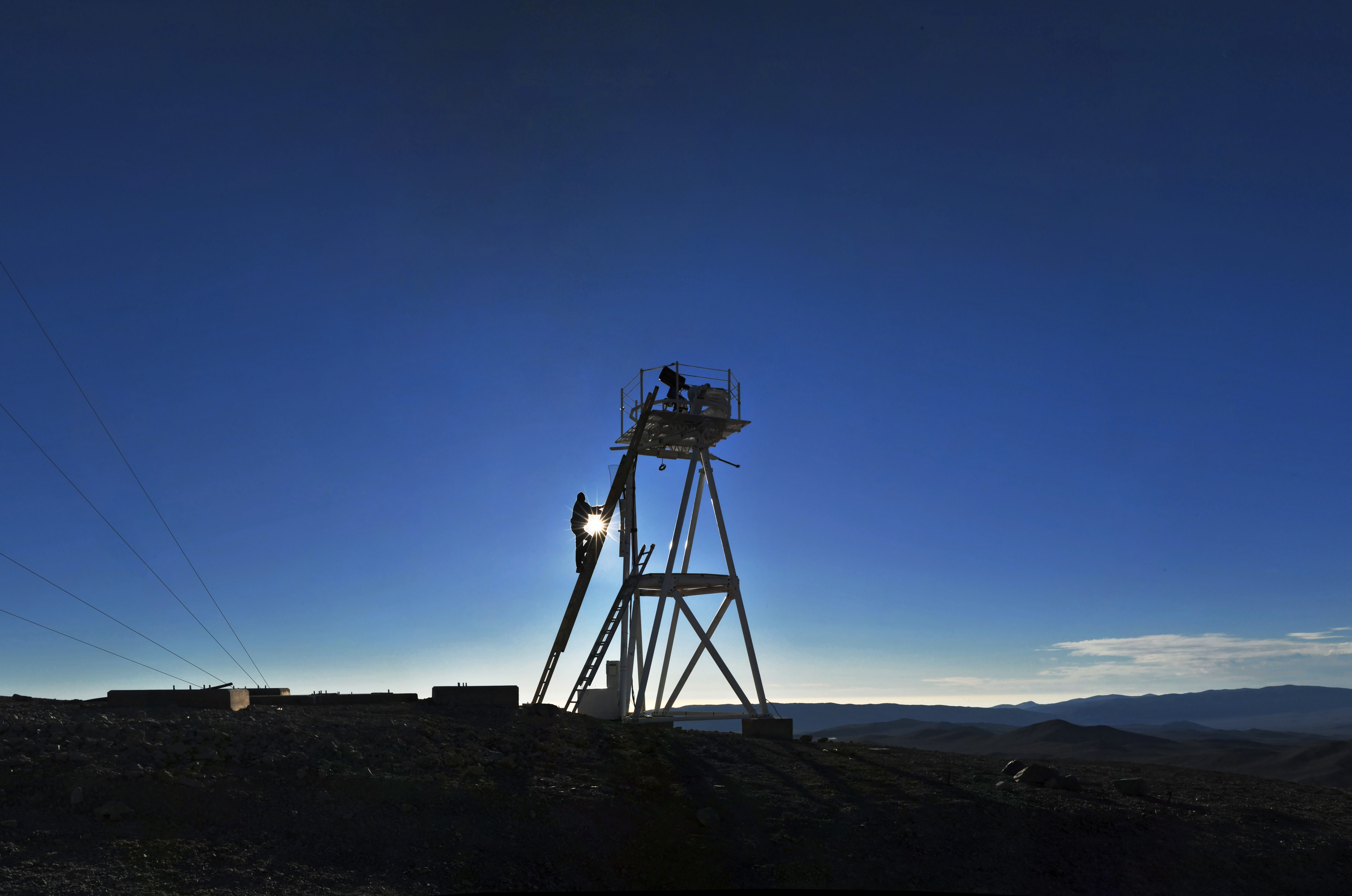
Sunset Cerro Armazones.

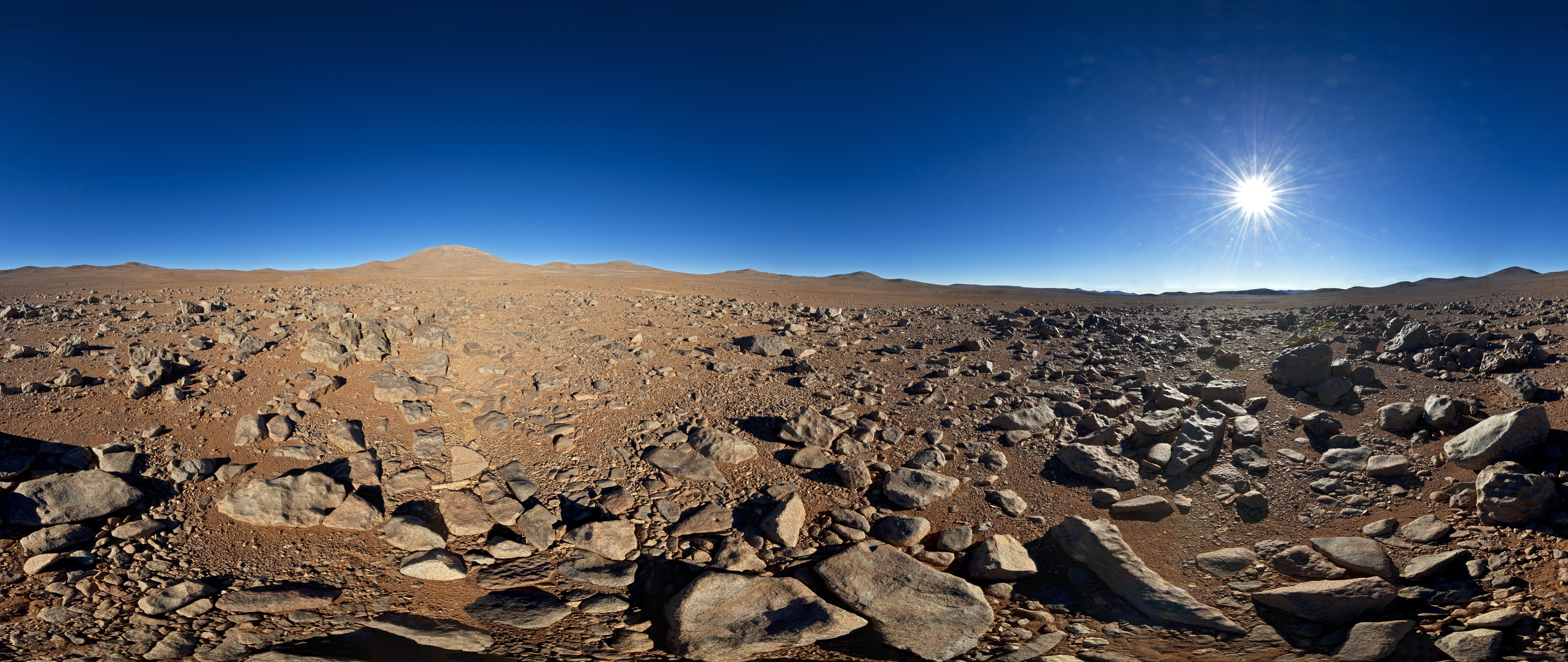
360 panorama.

After the groundbreaking back in June 2014, work continues on Cerro Armazones in preparation for construction work on the E-ELT.

The peak of Cerro Armazones appears flattened as efforts continue to craft a platform for the European Extremely Large Telescope.
