= Anna Barnacka =

Polish astrophysicist and entrepreneur

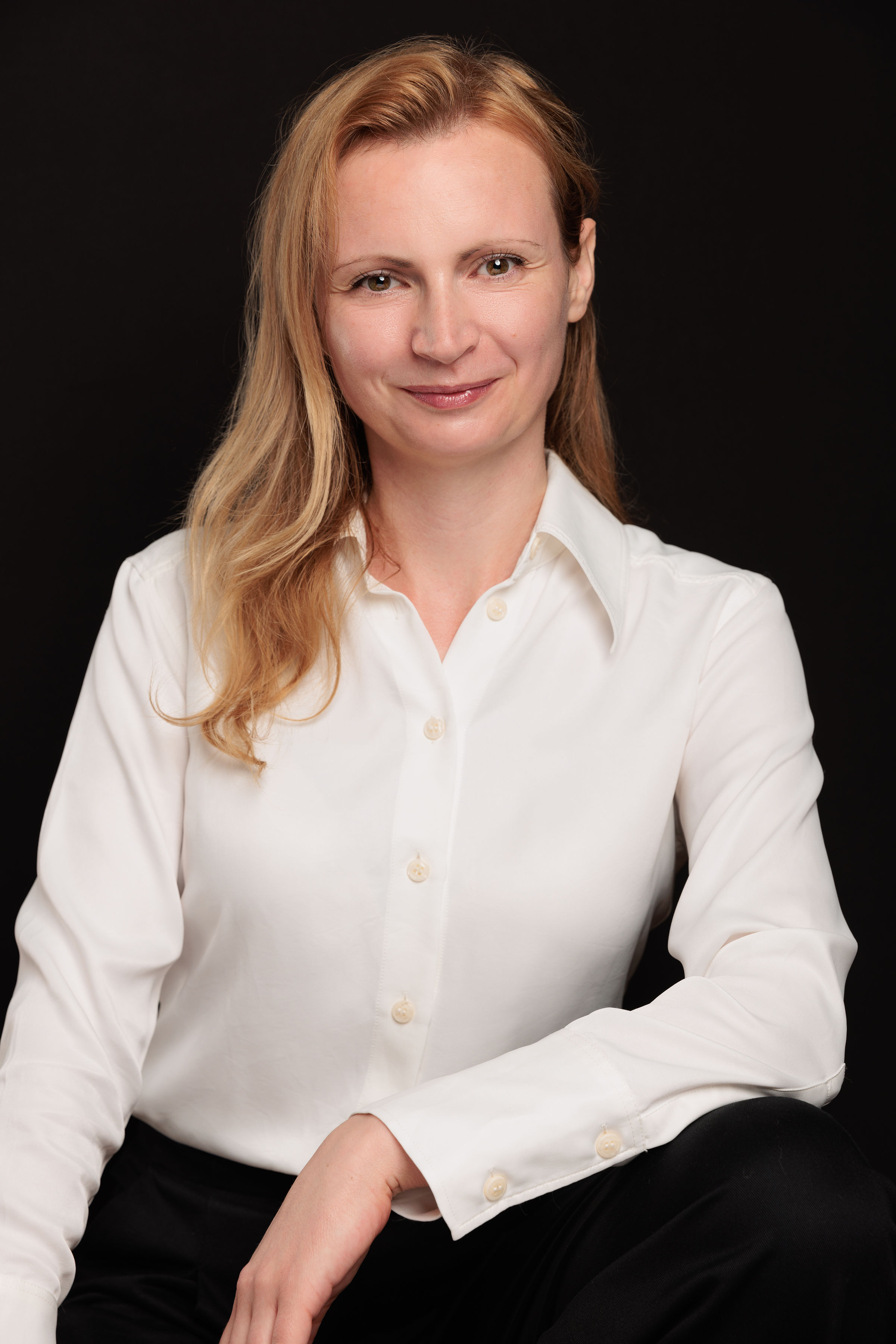
- Anna Barnacka
- Born: July 28, 1984 (age 42)
- Citizenship: Polish
- Education: Jagiellonian University Krakow, Poland (Habilitation). Nicolaus Copernicus Astronomical Center of the Polish Academy of Sciences Warsaw, Poland. (Ph.D.|astronomy); Paris-Sud University, France (Ph.D.|physics). Pedagogical University of Cracow, Poland (Master of Physics with Computer Science M.A.)
- Awards: NASA Einstein Fellowship; Nicolaus Copernicus Award
- Scientific career
- Fields: Astrophysics
- Workplaces: Jagiellonian University, Krakow; Center for Astrophysics | Harvard & Smithsonian, MindMics, Inc.

Anna Barnacka is a Polish astrophysicist and entrepreneur. She is known for her contributions to gravitational lensing and astroparticle physics, as well as for inventing in-ear infrasonic hymodynography.

== Education ==
Barnacka received her PhDs in astronomy from Nicolaus Copernicus Astronomical Center of the Polish Academy of Sciences in Warsaw, Poland, and physics from Paris-Sud University conducting her research at French Alternative Energies and Atomic Energy Commission in Paris, France. After earning her doctorates, she became a postdoctoral researcher at the Harvard-Smithsonian Center for Astrophysics. She received a NASA Einstein Fellowship in 2015, during which she researched the phenomena of gravitational lensing and pioneered techniques for turning gravitational lenses into high-resolution telescopes.

Barnacka's research has also focused on very high energy astroparticle physics, where she has been a member of international collaborations, including the Cherenkov Telescope Array, VERITAS, and H.E.S.S. As of 2022, she has an h-index of 43 with over 7100 citations to her work.

Barnacka is the founder and CEO of MindMics, a company presenting new tools to monitor vital signs related to cardiovascular health and wellness, and she has patent applications associated with this work. MindMics acts as a platform, that is composed of three parts: the hardware, the data systems and algorithms, and the interface. The company's earbud hardware measures and provides data on heart, brain, and other body function activity using infrasonic hemodynography technology. She has conducted studies on the technology's effectiveness, the results of which were published in professional publications such as the American Heart Association journal Circulation.

== Selected publications ==
- The CTA Consortium; Actis, M.; Agnetta, G.; Aharonian, F.; Akhperjanian, A.; Aleksić, J.; Aliu, E.; Allan, D.; Allekotte, I.; Antico, F.; Antonelli, L. A. (2011). "Design concepts for the Cherenkov Telescope Array CTA: an advanced facility for ground-based high-energy gamma-ray astronomy". Experimental Astronomy. 32 (3): 193–316. arXiv:1008.3703. Bibcode:2011ExA....32..193A. doi:10.1007/s10686-011-9247-0. ISSN 0922-6435. S2CID 122872675.
- Bernlöhr, K.; Barnacka, A.; Becherini, Y.; Blanch Bigas, O.; Carmona, E.; Colin, P.; Decerprit, G.; Di Pierro, F.; Dubois, F.; Farnier, C.; Funk, S. (2013-03-01). "Monte Carlo design studies for the Cherenkov Telescope Array". Astroparticle Physics. Seeing the High-Energy Universe with the Cherenkov Telescope Array - The Science Explored with the CTA. 43: 171–188. arXiv:1210.3503. Bibcode:2013APh....43..171B. doi:10.1016/j.astropartphys.2012.10.002. ISSN 0927-6505. S2CID 59057785.
- Barnacka, A.; Glicenstein, J.-F.; Moderski, R. (2012-08-02). "New constraints on primordial black holes abundance from femtolensing of gamma-ray bursts". Physical Review D. 86 (4) 043001. arXiv:1204.2056. Bibcode:2012PhRvD..86d3001B. doi:10.1103/PhysRevD.86.043001. ISSN 1550-7998. S2CID 119301812.
- Barnacka, Anna; Moderski, Rafal; Behera, Bagmeet; Brun, Pierre; Wagner, Stefan (2014-07-01). "PKS 1510-089: a rare example of a flat spectrum radio quasar with a very high-energy emission". Astronomy & Astrophysics. 567: A113. arXiv:1307.1779. Bibcode:2014A&A...567A.113B. doi:10.1051/0004-6361/201322205. ISSN 0004-6361. S2CID 55505285.
- Barnacka, Anna; Geller, Margaret J.; Dell'Antonio, Ian P.; Zitrin, Adi (2016-04-11). "The Structure of the Strongly Lensed Gamma-Ray Source B2 0218+35". The Astrophysical Journal. 821 (1): 58. arXiv:1511.02891. Bibcode:2016ApJ...821...58B. doi:10.3847/0004-637X/821/1/58. ISSN 1538-4357. S2CID 37897083.

== Awards and honors ==
In 2012, Barnacka received the Copernicus Astronomical Center Young Scientist Award primarily in recognition of her 2012 paper in Physical Review.

In 2020, Barnacka received Nicolaus Copernicus Prize in the category of Cosmology and Astrophysics (an honor given once every five years) by the Polish Academy of Arts and Sciences for the outstanding monothematic cycle of five manuscripts under the collective title: Development of a method of using gravitational lensing for astronomical measurements with high resolution. The work is summarized in the invited review manuscript in Physics Reports.
