= University of Tokyo Atacama Observatory =

Astronomical observatory in Chile

University of Tokyo Atacama Observatory (TAO)
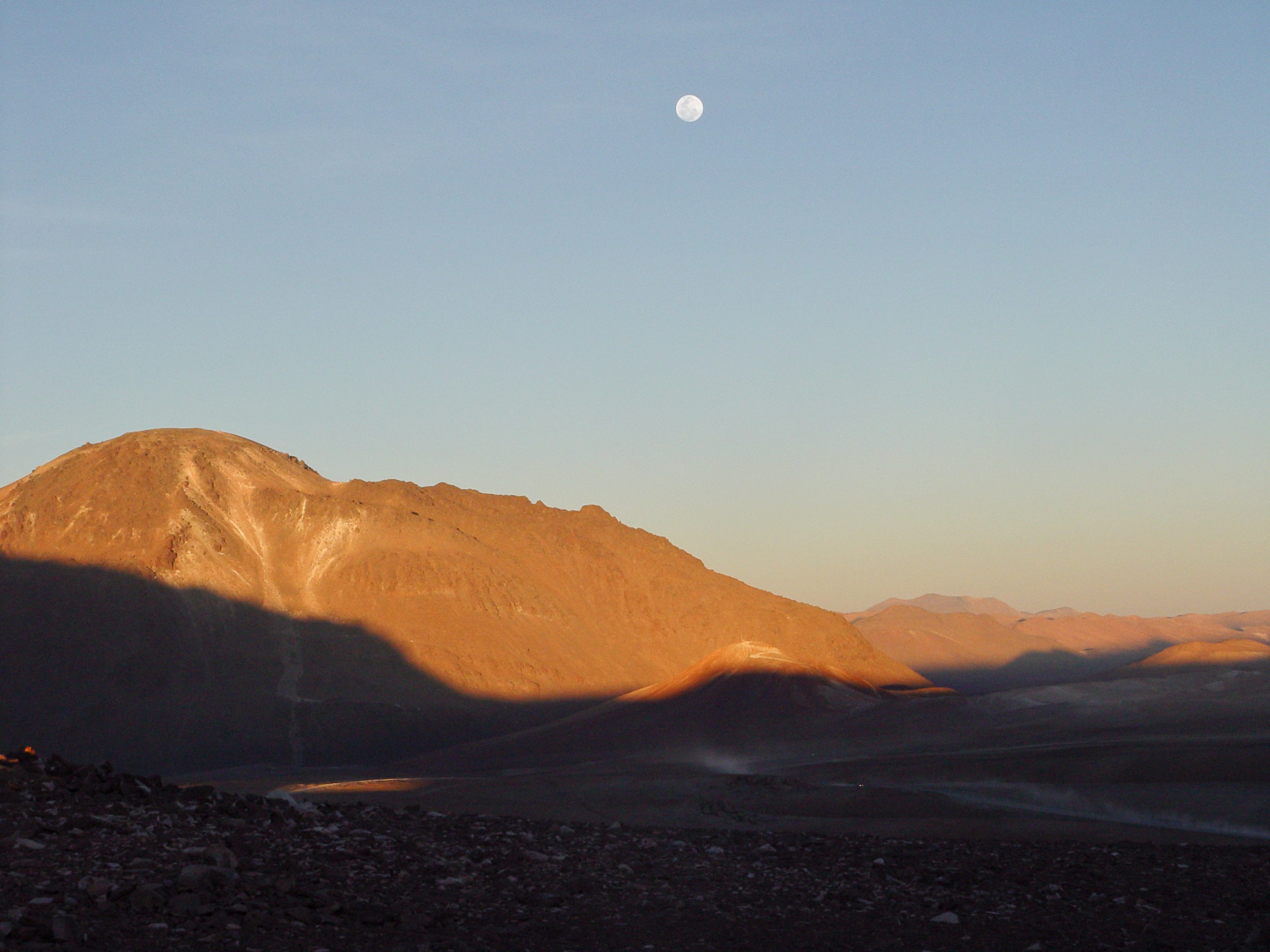
- Looking east towards Cerro Chajnantor, site of TAO
- Organization: University of Tokyo
- Location: Cerro Chajnantor, Atacama Desert, Chile
- Coordinates: 22°59′12″S 67°44′32″W
- Altitude: 5,640 m (18,500 ft)
- Established: 2009
- Website: http://www.ioa.s.u-tokyo.ac.jp/TAO/ (English translation)

Telescopes
- miniTAO: 1m optical-infrared
- (under construction): 6.5m optical-infrared

The University of Tokyo Atacama Observatory (TAO) is an astronomical observatory located on the summit of Cerro Chajnantor, at an altitude of 5,640 m (18,500 ft) within a lava dome in the Atacama Desert of northern Chile. The site is located less than 5 km (3.1 mi) north-northeast of the Llano de Chajnantor Observatory, where the Atacama Large Millimeter Array (ALMA) is located, but is over 580 m (1,900 ft) higher in elevation. It is also 28 m (92 ft) higher than the site proposed for the Fred Young Submillimeter Telescope on the same peak. The observatory is operated by the Graduate School of Science and Faculty of Science, University of Tokyo. Operation began in 2024.

The observatory operates the TAO 6.5m 6.5 m (260 in) optical-infrared telescope at the site. The high altitude of the observatory is essential for its mission, as infrared light is absorbed by water vapor in the atmosphere, so it must be located at high altitude where the atmosphere is thin. In 2023, TAO was noted as one of the few major telescopes in the world with light pollution below acceptable levels of interference.

== Description ==
The telescope's primary mirror has a diameter of 6.5 m (260 in) and is silver-coated. The secondary mirror is equipped with adaptive optics to compensate for atmospheric turbulence. A third mirror allows switching between several instruments. There is a Cassegrain focus for the mid-infrared range, a Nasmyth focus for the near-infrared range and another Nasmyth focus for far-infrared.

The telescope has two primary instruments, the MIMIZUKU mid-infrared imager and spectrograph, and the SWIMS near-infrared spectrograph. Both instruments were tested at the Subaru Telescope and achieved first light in the summer of 2018. After testing, the instruments were installed into the TAO telescope in 2023. MIMIZUKU has similar spatial resolution to the James Webb Space Telescope's Mid-Infrared Instrument (MIRI) and wider frequency range, although it is less sensitive.

== Construction ==
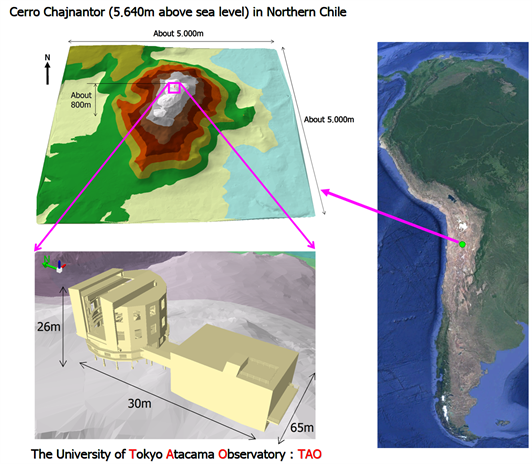
3D model of Tokyo Atacama Observatory and Cerro Chajnantor (5,640 m above sea level) in Northern Chile.

The project started with site studies in the late 1990s and early 2000s. Road construction to the summit of Cerro Chajnantor started in November 2005. The road was opened April 2006.

The next step was the construction and installation of the 1.0 m (39 in) miniTAO pilot telescope. miniTAO was completed in 2009 and achieved first light in March 2009 in the visible region, and in June 2009 for the infrared region. TAO then become the highest permanent astronomical observatory in the world.

MiniTAO allowed the project to determine the viewing radius of the full-size telescope. The construction of the TAO telescope started in 2013.

Ground-breaking ceremonies at the site for the main instrument building were held in late 2017. In January 2018, the TAO telescope mount was completed and assembled in Japan. This was done for testing purposes; the telescope mount was then disassembled and shipped to Chile on multiple vessels in 2020. The observation and operations building was similarly assembled in Kazo, Saitama in May 2020 for testing purposes, and then disassembled and shipped on eight separate vessels over the course of 2021.

TAO was opened on 30 April 2024. The telescope achieved first light at the beginning of May 2024.

Because of the high risk of altitude sickness for construction workers and astronomers, a base facility was also constructed in San Pedro de Atacama (about 50 km from the summit), for the telescope to be operated remotely.

== See also ==
- List of astronomical observatories
- List of highest astronomical observatories
- Llano de Chajnantor Observatory
