= Halfmann Teleskoptechnik =

Telescope Manufacturer

- Type: Private
- Industry: Manufacturing
- Founded: 1996
- Headquarters: Neusäß, Germany
- Key people: Oliver Halfmann, Managing Director
- Products: Professional telescopes and other astronomical devices, retractable enclosures
- Website: Halfmann Teleskoptechnik website

Halfmann Teleskoptechnik is a German-based manufacturer of professional robotic telescopes.

== Origins and history ==
The professional branch of the company started in 1996 with delivery of special devices (siderostats) for the European Southern Observatory (ESO).

== Projects ==
Recent telescope projects include the Hamburg Robotic Telescope HRT of the Hamburger Sternwarte (Hamburg Observatory), completed in 2005; the MONET telescopes installed at McDonald Observatory in Texas and the South African Astronomical Observatory in South Africa; the STELLA and RoboTel telescopes erected at Izana Observatory in Tenerife and at Potsdam, Germany; and the IRIS Infrared telescope to be installed at Cerro Armazones Observatory in Chile. All telescopes are designed for remote and robotic operation.
