= Hexapod-Telescope =

Astronomical telescope

The Hexapod-Telescope (HPT) was a 1.5-metre (59 in) Ritchey-Chrétien optical telescope that operated 2006–2017 in the Cerro Armazones Observatory (OCA) in northern Chile, currently decommissioned.

The notable feature of the HPT – and the reason for its name – was the design of its mount. Instead of the typical mounting where the telescope moves on two rotating axes, the mirror cell was supported by six extensible (variable-length) struts, an arrangement known as a Stewart platform. This configuration allowed the telescope to move in all six spatial degrees of freedom and provided strong structural integrity. Furthermore, the six-leg structure allowed for very precise positioning and repeatability. The HPT could have been rotated ±45° around the optical axis in any position. The mount allowed observations up to 30° elevation. Additionally, by using carbon fiber composites, the HPT was lighter by a factor of ten than classical telescopes of the same aperture. As a result, the ratio of bearing pressure and its own weight was very high. The active primary mirror had a diameter of 1.5 meters and – with a thickness of only 50 mm – was mounted on 36 piezo actuators. The secondary mirror was also supported by a motorised adjustable hexapod.

The disadvantage of the system was that controlling and aiming a hexapod-mounted telescope was much more complex than with conventional telescope mounts. The electromechanical design also allowed only relatively slow travel speeds. The leg structure left very little room for instruments at the Cassegrain focus; fiber optic coupling was required in most cases.

The Hexapod Telescope (HPT) was planned as a prototype for an innovative telescope concept in the 1980s and completed in the 1990s by Krupp Industrietechnik (later Vertex Antennentechnik) in collaboration with astronomers of the Astronomy Institute of the Ruhr University Bochum (AIRUB) in Germany, led by Prof. Rolf Chini. The Zerodur optics were from Carl Zeiss company at Jena, Germany. The HPT was thoroughly tested at AIRUB and, in 2006, it was moved to its new location in OCA. The HPT showed great potential for the construction of future very large telescopes, but as it had accumulated several technical problems, and could not be repaired due to a lack of replacement parts, it was decommissioned in 2017.

The HPT was equipped with the Bochum Echelle Spectrograph for the Optical (BESO), developed by joint effort of AIRUB and the Landessternwarte Heidelberg-Königstuhl. BESO is a copy of the Fiber-fed Extended Range Optical Spectrograph (FEROS) operated by the European Southern Observatory. Though the HPT has been decommissioned, BESO remains operational, currently mounted on the 1.5-m telescope in OCA.

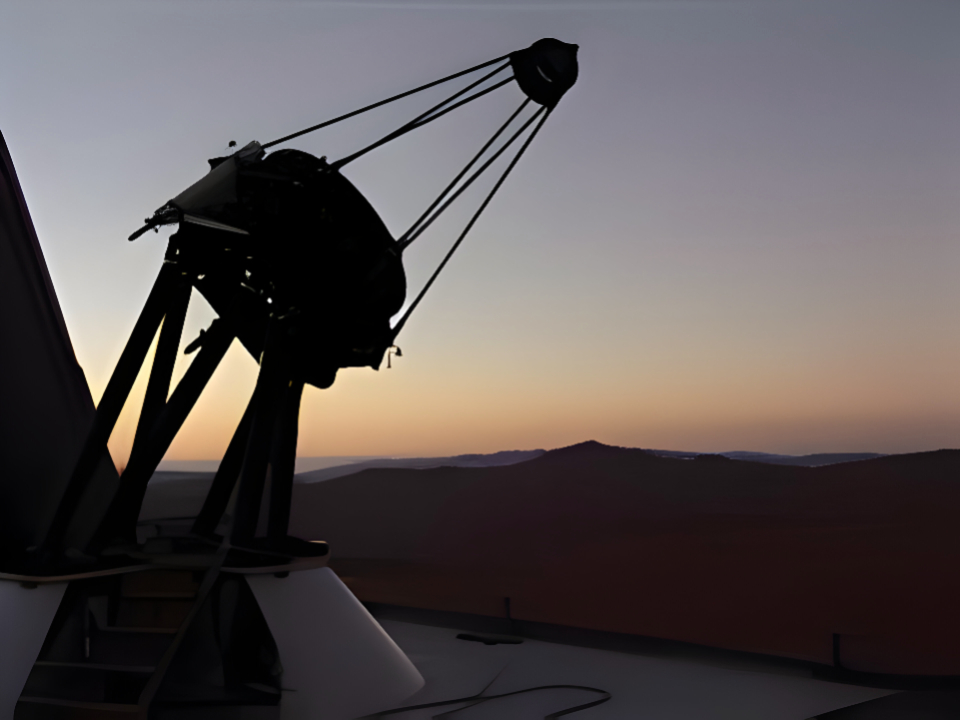

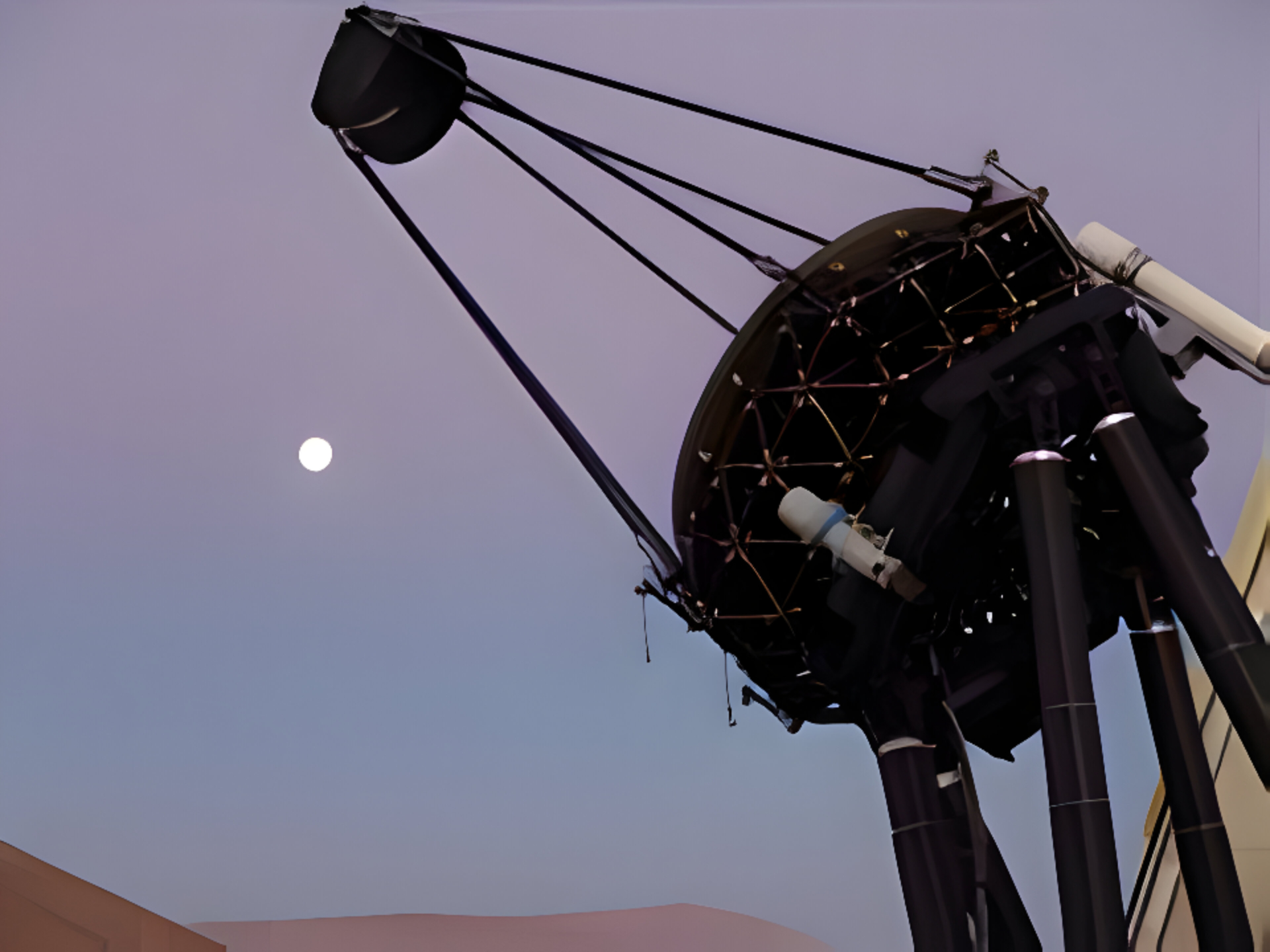

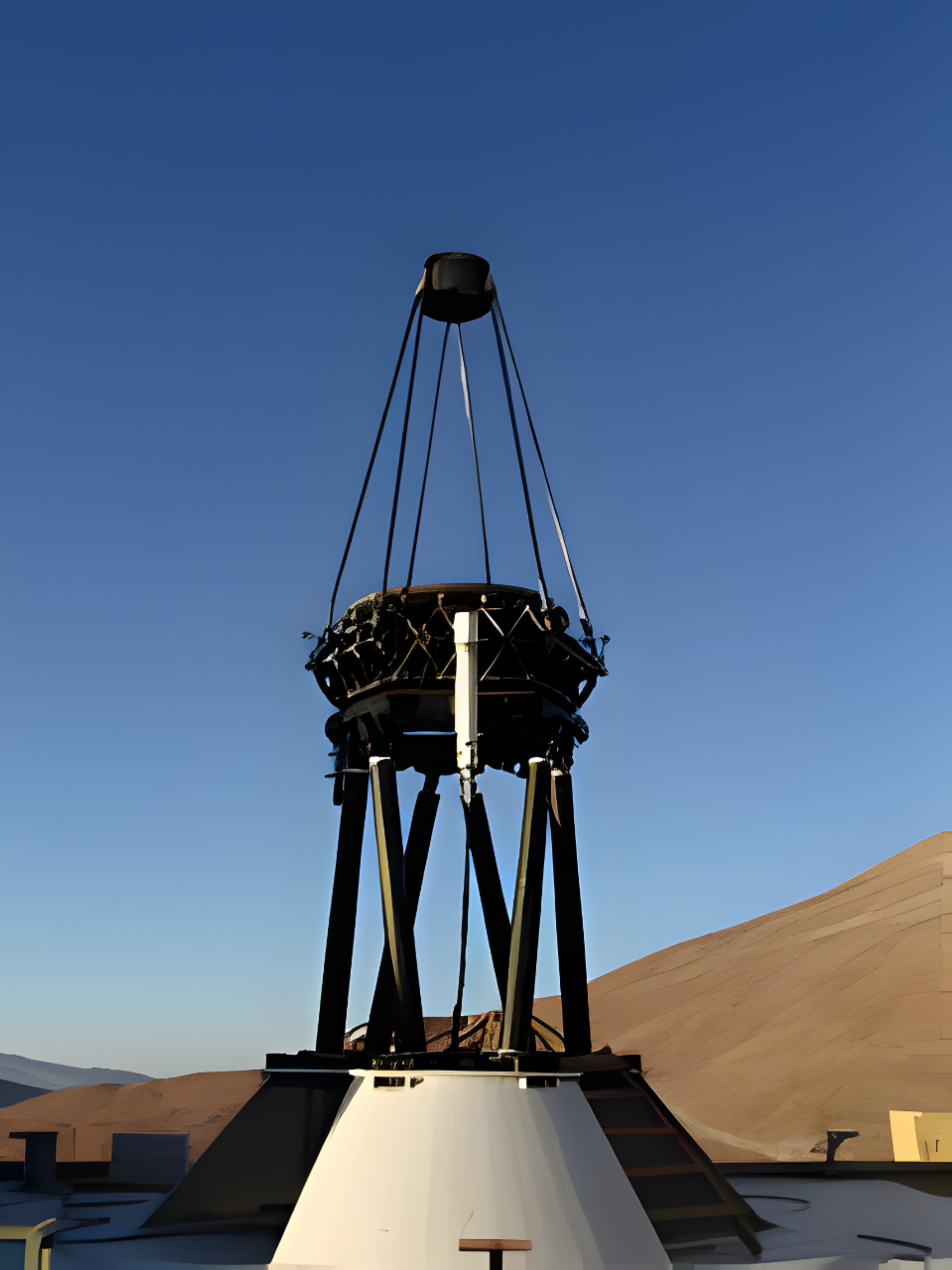
