= Araucaria Project =

International collaboration to improve calibration of the extragalactic distance scale

The Araucaria Project is an international science collaboration focused on improving the calibration of the extragalactic distance scale based on observations of major distance indicators in several nearby galaxies.

== Project ==
The Araucaria Project is a collaboration between astronomers from institutions in Europe, Chile and the US. Its principal aim is to provide an improved calibration of the local extragalactic distance scale. In the process of setting up the extragalactic distance scale, the greatest difficulty leading to the currently largest contribution on the systematic uncertainty of the Hubble constant lies in the determination of accurate absolute distances to nearby galaxies. The principal reason for this persisting difficulty is in the unknown dependencies of stellar standard candles, used to measure the distances of nearby galaxies, on the environmental properties of their host galaxies (metallicity, age of the stellar populations etc.). The Araucaria Project is an effort to remedy this situation for several of the most important stellar candles, including Cepheid variables, RR Lyrae stars, red clump giants, and blue supergiants which all have the potential to provide accurate distance determinations to nearby galaxies once their environmental dependencies are well calibrated.

The sample of galaxies include NGC 6822, IC 1613 and NGC 3109 in the Local Group, and NGC 55, NGC 247, NGC 300 and NGC 7793 in the Sculptor Group.

== Main discoveries ==
- The dynamical mass of a classical Cepheid variable star in an eclipsing binary system
- RR-Lyrae-type pulsations from a 0.26-solar-mass star in a binary system
- An eclipsing-binary distance to the Large Magellanic Cloud accurate to two per cent, to one per cent
