= Nicolaus Copernicus Astronomical Center of the Polish Academy of Sciences =

Polish astronomical institute

Nicolaus Copernicus Astronomical Center
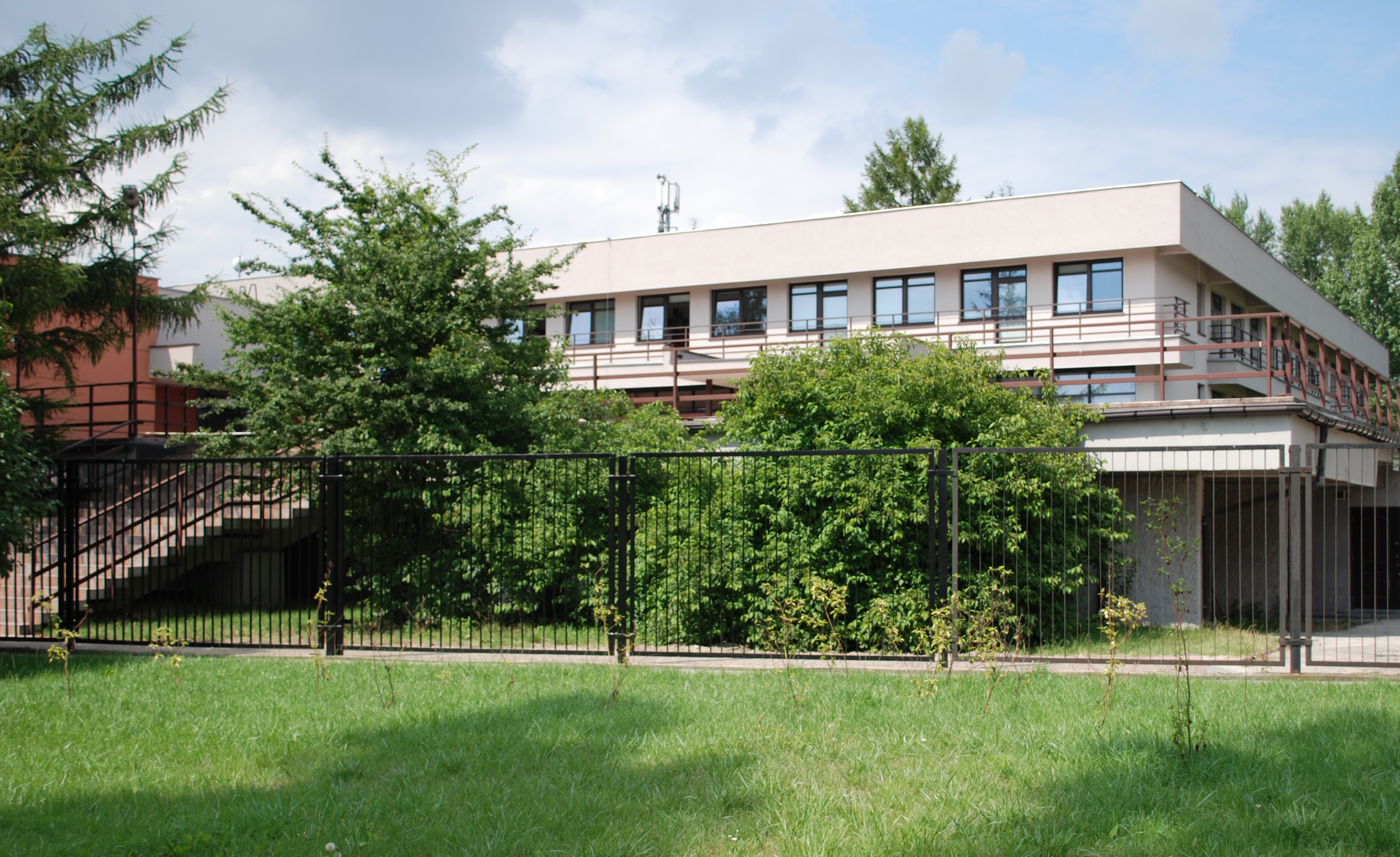
- Headquarters building in Warsaw
- Abbreviation: NCAC, CAMK
- Formation: 11 Feb 1976; 50 years ago
- Type: Research institute
- Headquarters: Warsaw, Bartycka 18
- Region served: Poland
- Director: Piotr Życki
- Website: www.camk.edu.pl/en

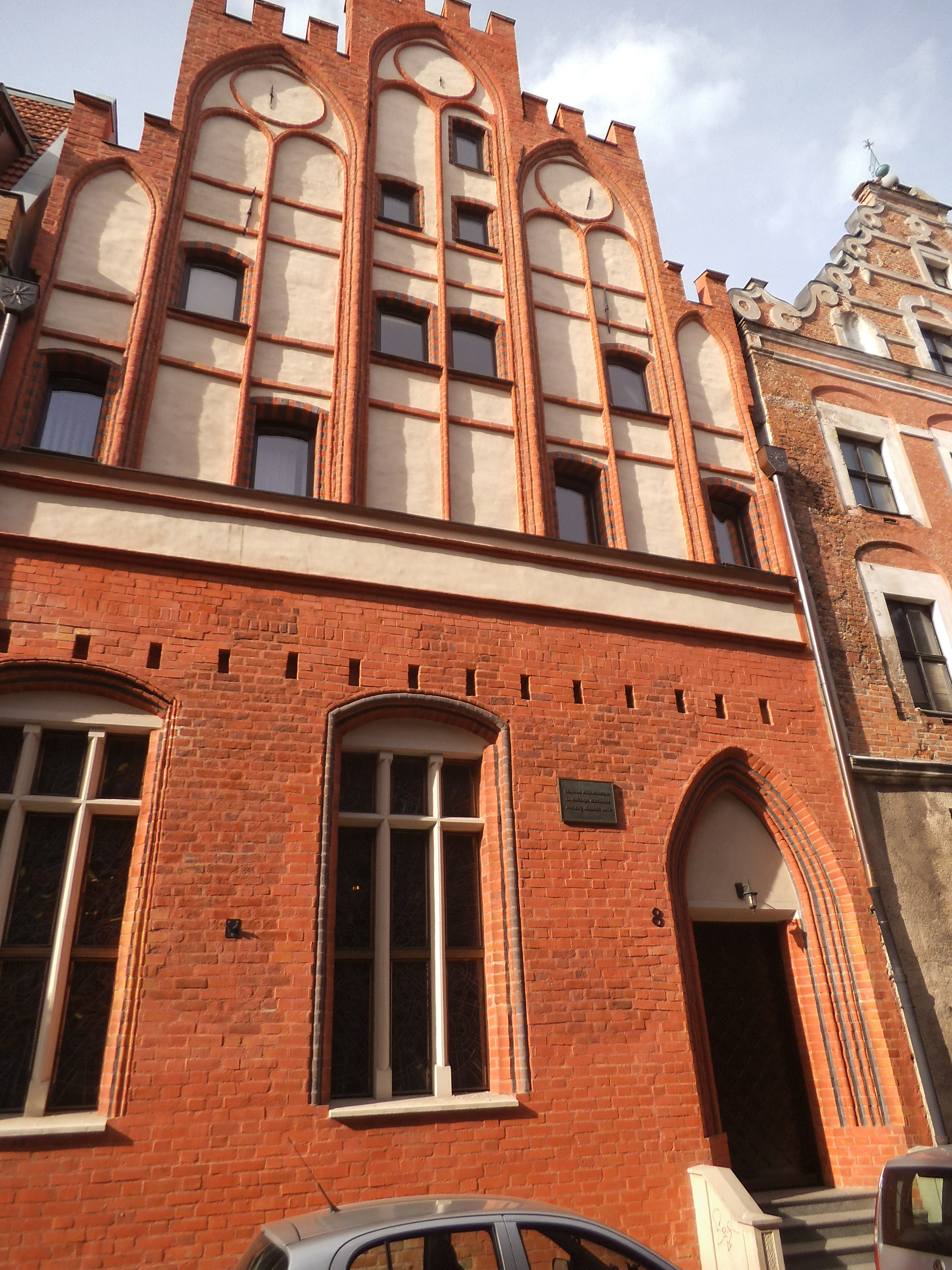
CAMK in Toruń

The Nicolaus Copernicus Astronomical Center (Polish: Centrum Astronomiczne im. Mikołaja Kopernika), also CAMK or NCAC, is a Polish scientific research institute of the Polish Academy of Sciences headquartered in Warsaw, Poland. It is a leading institution in the country in the field of astronomy.

== History ==
In the 1950s the Polish Academy of Sciences began planning for a new center for astronomers from all over Poland. However, a few years later the Academy's administration decided to withdraw from the project, and it was never funded. In the early 1970s a group of Polish astronomers proposed a new initiative. During an assembly of the Polish Academy of Sciences, professors Bohdan Paczyński and Józef Smak presented a project for a theoretical-astrophysics institute, in order to overcome problems related to the high cost of building a telescope.

In May 1971 the US National Academy of Sciences sent an envoy to Poland from Yerkes Observatory. The envoy spoke with many representatives of the Polish astronomical community, and a more precise concept of CAMK emerged. It was well received by the US National Academy of Sciences; and the US could provide substantial financial support for the CAMK's construction.

There were, in US-owned funds, nearly $351 million Polish zlotys of "wheat money". This amount of Polish zlotych had accumulated as a result of US agricultural sales to Poland following World War II. At that time the Polish currency could not be converted into other currencies, and so could not be counted in the US federal budget. It was therefore convenient for both the United States and for Poland to build CAMK with those funds. Part of the Polish "wheat debt" to the US could be cancelled, at no cost in dollars to the US government.

The CAMK center was built in Siekierki, then a rather poor district of Warsaw. The main road of Siekierki, ulica Bartycka, was also built at that time to connect the institute with the rest of the city. This new building was inaugurated on May 24, 1978. Next year, CAMK was licensed to award PhD degrees. Since then, CAMK maintains its own hotel for visitors and manages funds to support PhD students and provide research fellowships for more senior scientists.

In 1981, martial law was declared in Poland in order to suppress the Solidarity movement. In this period, many CAMK employees chose permanent emigration. With their presence abroad, they were providing journals for the library, spare parts for the ageing computer system, and money for postdocs and short-term visitors. In fact, during the martial law, the right to travel abroad was restricted, making research and collaborations difficult. Some CAMK scientists were even jailed for their pro-Solidarity activities.

Bans and restrictions were ultimately lifted in 1989, with the end of the so-called Polish People's Republic: Polish astronomy and CAMK started to grow and gain more international relevance. With the advent of internet in Poland, CAMK was one of the first places in Poland to connect to the world-wide-web: the early parabola used for the internet connection in the early '90s is still visible in the CAMK's front garden from ulica Bartycka.

== Description ==
The main subjects of research include: stellar evolution, binary stars, asteroseismology, circumstellar matter, compact objects (neutron stars, black holes), accretion processes, structure and evolution of active galaxies, cosmology and extrasolar planets. In 2020 CAMK employed 69 researchers.

The CAMK center has also a Department of Astrophysics in Toruń, a Polish city famous for being Nicolaus Copernicus's hometown and its medieval old town.
