= European Southern Observatory =

Intergovernmental observatory in Chile

Coordinates: 48°15′36″N 11°40′16″E

European Organisation for Astronomical Research in the Southern Hemisphere
- (L–R): ESO logo; Map of member states
- Abbreviation: ESO
- Formation: 28 May 1962; 64 years ago
- Type: Intergovernmental organisation
- Headquarters: Garching, Germany
- Members: 16
- Official language: English, French, German
- Director General: Andreas Kaufer
- Website: www.eso.org

Trailer of the European Southern Observatory

The European Organisation for Astronomical Research in the Southern Hemisphere, commonly referred to as the European Southern Observatory (ESO), is an intergovernmental research organisation made up of 16 member states for ground-based astronomy. Created in 1962, ESO has provided astronomers with state-of-the-art research facilities and access to the southern sky. The organisation employs over 750 staff members and receives annual member state contributions of approximately €162 million. Its observatories are located in northern Chile.

ESO has built and operated some of the largest and most technologically advanced telescopes. These include the 3.6 m New Technology Telescope, an early pioneer in the use of active optics, and the Very Large Telescope (VLT), which consists of four individual 8.2 m telescopes and four smaller auxiliary telescopes which can all work together or separately. The Atacama Large Millimeter Array observes the universe in the millimetre and submillimetre wavelength ranges, and is the world's largest ground-based astronomy project to date. It was completed in March 2013 in an international collaboration by Europe (represented by ESO), North America, East Asia and Chile.

Currently under construction is the Extremely Large Telescope. It will use a 39.3-metre-diameter segmented mirror, and become the world's largest optical reflecting telescope when operational towards the end of this decade. Its light-gathering power will allow detailed studies of planets around other stars, the first objects in the universe, supermassive black holes, and the nature and distribution of the dark matter and dark energy which dominate the universe.

ESO's observing facilities have made astronomical discoveries and produced several astronomical catalogues. Its findings include the discovery of the most distant gamma-ray burst and evidence for a black hole at the centre of the Milky Way. In 2004, the VLT allowed astronomers to obtain the first picture of an extrasolar planet (2M1207b) orbiting a brown dwarf 173 light-years away. The High Accuracy Radial Velocity Planet Searcher (HARPS) instrument installed on the older ESO 3.6 m telescope led to the discovery of extrasolar planets, including Gliese 581c—one of the smallest planets seen outside the Solar System.

== Past ==
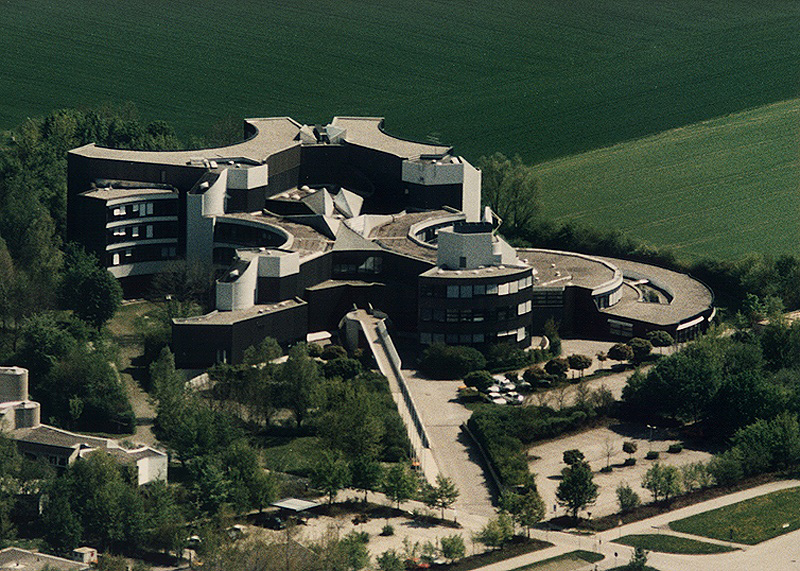
The ESO headquarters in Garching, Germany, in 1997

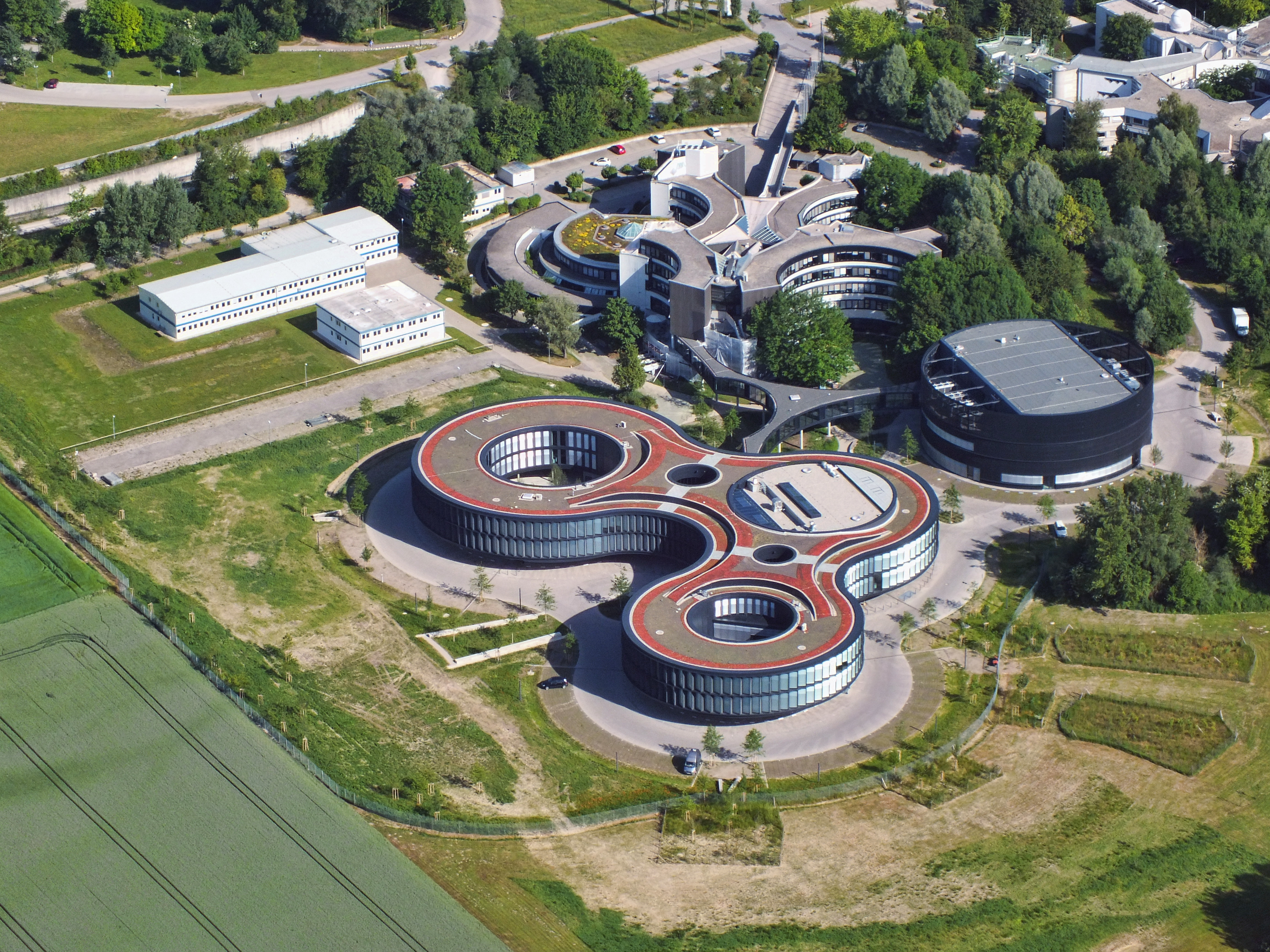
The same site in 2014, a year after a new extension was built (in the foreground)

The idea that European astronomers should establish a common large observatory was broached by Walter Baade and Jan Oort at the Leiden Observatory in the Netherlands in spring 1953. It was pursued by Oort, who gathered a group of astronomers in Leiden to consider it on 21 June that year. Immediately thereafter, the subject was further discussed at the Groningen conference in the Netherlands. On 26 January 1954, an ESO declaration was signed by astronomers from six European countries expressing the wish that a joint European observatory be established in the southern hemisphere.

At the time, all reflector telescopes with an aperture of 2 metres or more were located in the northern hemisphere. The decision to build the observatory in the southern hemisphere resulted from the necessity of observing the southern sky; some research subjects (such as the central parts of the Milky Way and the Magellanic Clouds) were accessible only from the southern hemisphere.

Director General	In office
Otto Heckmann	1962–1969
Adriaan Blaauw	1970–1974
Lodewijk Woltjer	1975–1987
Harry van der Laan	1988–1992
Riccardo Giacconi	1993–1999
Catherine Cesarsky	1999–2007
Tim de Zeeuw	2007–2017
Xavier Barcons	2017–2026
Andreas Kaufer	2026–present
Source: www.eso.org, about ESO

It was initially planned to set up telescopes in South Africa where several European observatories were located (Boyden Observatory), but tests from 1955 to 1962 demonstrated that a site in the Andes was preferable: When Jürgen Stock enthusiastically reported his observations from Chile, Otto Heckmann decided to leave the South African project on hold. ESO—at that time about to sign the contracts with South Africa—decided to establish their observatory in Chile. The ESO Convention was signed 5 October 1962 by Belgium, Germany, France, the Netherlands and Sweden. Otto Heckmann was nominated as the organisation's first director general on 1 November 1962. On 15 November 1963 Chile was chosen as the site for ESO's observatory.

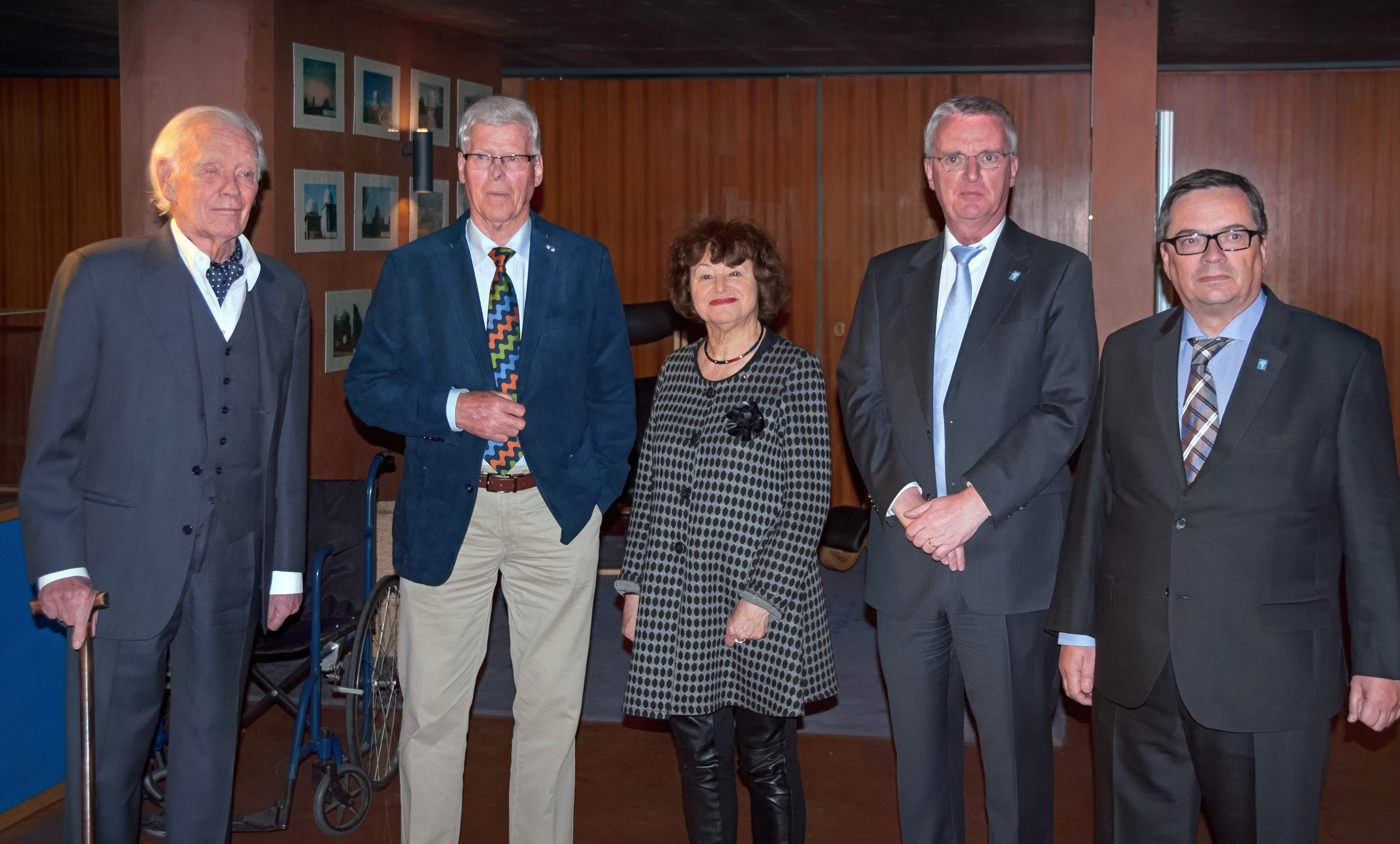
Directors general of ESO (from left to right): Lodewijk Woltjer, Harry van der Laan, Catherine Cesarsky, Tim de Zeeuw and Xavier Barcons

A preliminary proposal for a convention of astronomy organisations in these five countries was drafted in 1954. Although some amendments were made in the initial document, the convention proceeded slowly until 1960 when it was discussed during that year's committee meeting. The new draft was examined in detail, and a council member of CERN (the European Organization for Nuclear Research) highlighted the need for a convention between governments (in addition to organisations). The convention and government involvement became pressing due to rapidly rising costs of site-testing expeditions. The final 1962 version was largely adopted from the CERN convention, due to similarities between the organisations and the dual membership of some members.

In 1966, the first ESO telescope at the La Silla site in Chile began operating. Because CERN (like ESO) had sophisticated instrumentation, the astronomy organisation frequently turned to the nuclear-research body for advice and a collaborative agreement between ESO and CERN was signed in 1970. Several months later, ESO's telescope division moved into a CERN building in Geneva and ESO's Sky Atlas Laboratory was established on CERN property. ESO's European departments moved into the new ESO headquarters in Garching (near Munich), Germany, in 1980.

In 2015, Guillem Anglada-Escudé confirmed the existence of Proxima Centauri b at the Southern Observatory.

=== Member states ===
Country	Accession
Belgium	1962
Germany	1962
France	1962
Netherlands	1964
Sweden	1964
Denmark	1967
Switzerland	1982
Italy	1982
Portugal	1 January 2001
United Kingdom	8 July 2002
Finland	1 July 2004
Spain	1 July 2006
Czech Republic	1 January 2007
Austria	1 July 2008
Poland	28 October 2014
Ireland	28 September 2018

== Chilean observation sites ==
Map of Chile with ESO's four observatories

Although ESO is headquartered in Germany, its telescopes and observatories are in northern Chile, where the organisation operates advanced ground-based astronomical facilities:

- La Silla, which hosts the New Technology Telescope (NTT)
- Paranal, where the Very Large Telescope (VLT) is located
- Llano de Chajnantor, where ALMA, the Atacama Large Millimeter/submillimeter Array, is located

These are among the best locations for astronomical observations in the southern hemisphere. An ESO project is the Extremely Large Telescope (ELT), a 40-metre-class telescope based on a five-mirror design and the formerly planned Overwhelmingly Large Telescope. The ELT will be the largest visible and near-infrared telescope in the world. ESO began its design in early 2006, and aimed to begin construction in 2012. Construction work at the ELT site started in June 2014. As decided by the ESO council on 26 April 2010, a fourth site (Cerro Armazones) is to be home to ELT.

Each year about 2,000 requests are made for the use of ESO telescopes, for four to six times more nights than are available. Observations made with these instruments appear in a number of peer-reviewed publications annually; in 2017, more than 1,000 reviewed papers based on ESO data were published.

ESO telescopes generate large amounts of data at a high rate, which are stored in a permanent archive facility at ESO headquarters. The archive contains more than 1.5 million images (or spectra) with a total volume of about 65 terabytes (65,000,000,000,000 bytes) of data.

ESO telescopes
Name	Short	Size	Type	Location	Year
ESO 3.6 m telescope – hosting HARPS	ESO 3.6m	3.57 m	optical and infrared	La Silla	1977
MPG/ESO 2.2 m telescope	MPG	2.20 m	optical and infrared	La Silla	1984
New Technology Telescope	NTT	3.58 m	optical and infrared	La Silla	1989
Very Large Telescope	VLT	4 × 8.2 m 4 × 1.8 m	optical to mid-infrared, array	Paranal	1998
Visible and Infrared Survey Telescope for Astronomy	VISTA	4.1 m	near-infrared, survey	Paranal	2009
VLT Survey Telescope	VST	2.6 m	optical, survey	Paranal	2011
Atacama Large Millimeter/submillimeter Array^{[A]}	ALMA	50 × 12 m 12 × 7 m 4 × 12 m	millimetre-/submillimetre-wavelength interferometer array	Chajnantor	2011
Extremely Large Telescope	ELT	39.3 m	optical to mid-infrared	Cerro Armazones	End of this decade
^{A} ALMA is a partnership among Europe, the United States, Canada, East Asia and the Republic of Chile. · Additional ESO research facilities are located in Santiago, Chile and include a library, computing resources and programmes for visiting scientists. · ESO also maintains close ties with other observatories and universities throughout the country. · Source: ESO – Telescopes and Instrumentation

=== La Silla ===
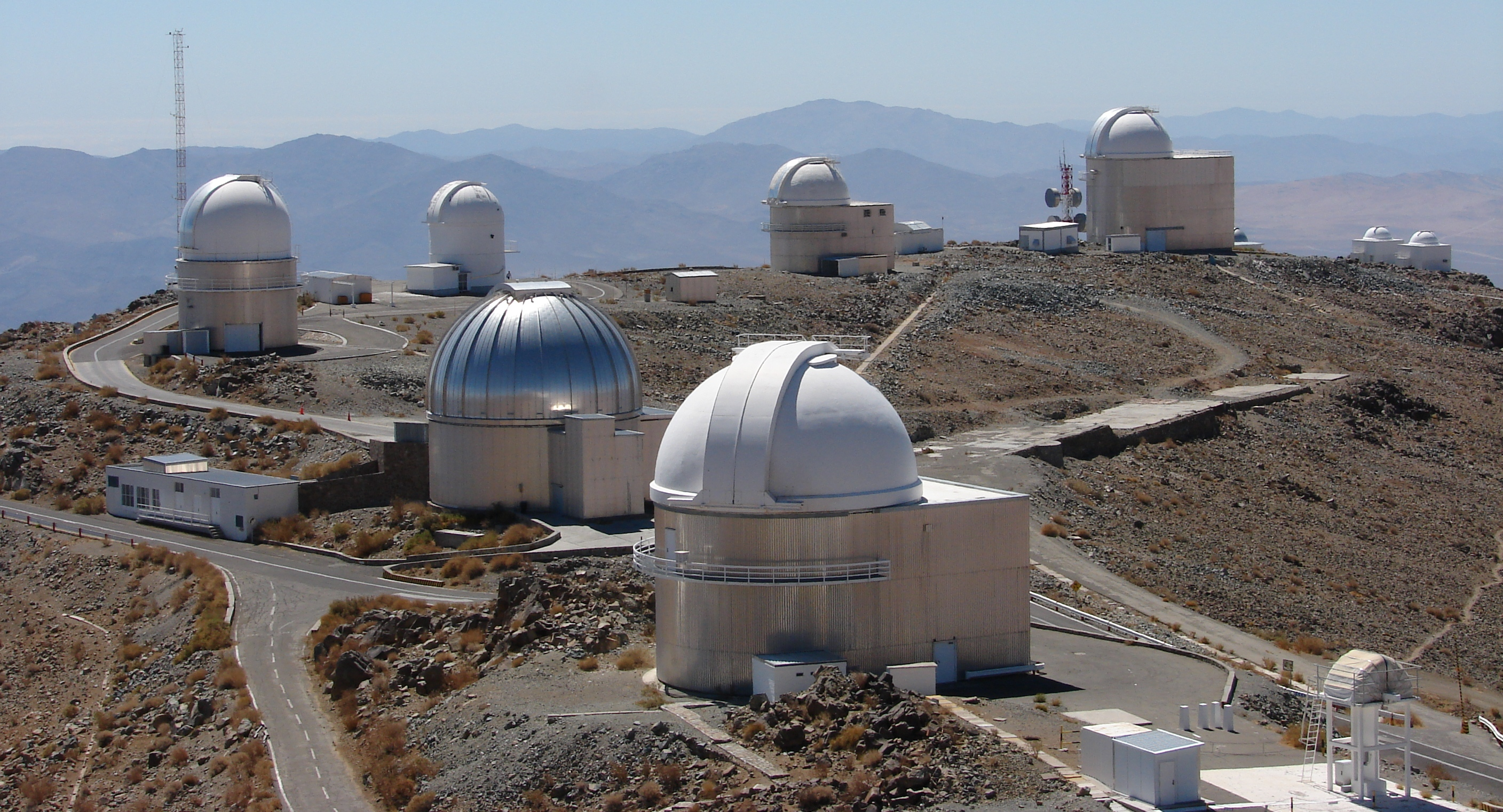
La Silla cluster of telescopes

La Silla, located in the southern Atacama Desert 600 kilometres (370 mi) north of Santiago de Chile at an altitude of 2,400 metres (7,900 ft), is the home of ESO's original observation site. Like other observatories in the area, La Silla is far from sources of light pollution and has one of the darkest night skies on Earth. In La Silla, ESO operates three telescopes: a 3.6-metre telescope, the New Technology Telescope (NTT) and the 2.2-metre Max-Planck-ESO Telescope.

The observatory hosts visitor instruments, attached to a telescope for the duration of an observational run and then removed. La Silla also hosts national telescopes, such as the 1.2-metre Swiss and the 1.5-metre Danish telescopes.

About 300 reviewed publications annually are attributable to the work of the observatory. Discoveries made with La Silla telescopes include the HARPS-spectrograph detection of the planets orbiting within the Gliese 581 planetary system, which contains the first known rocky planet in a habitable zone outside the solar system. Several telescopes at La Silla played a role in linking gamma-ray bursts, the most energetic explosions in the universe since the Big Bang, with the explosions of massive stars. The ESO La Silla Observatory also played a role in the study of supernova SN 1987A.

==== ESO 3.6-metre telescope ====
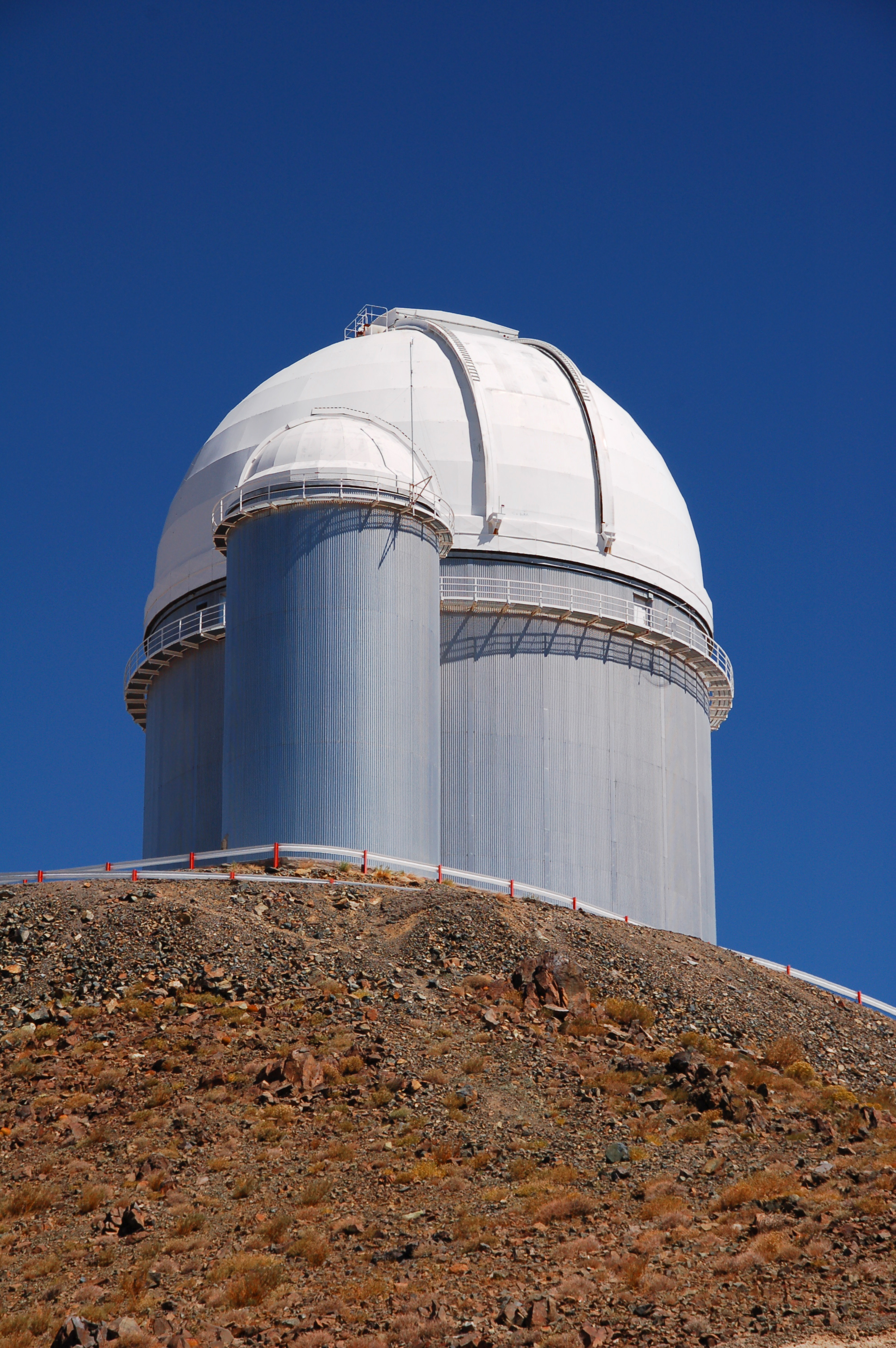
The ESO 3.6 m Telescope

The ESO 3.6-metre telescope began operations in 1977. It has been upgraded, including the installation of a new secondary mirror. The conventionally designed horseshoe-mount telescope was primarily used for infrared spectroscopy; it now hosts the HARPS spectrograph, used in search of extra-solar planets and for asteroseismology. The telescope was designed for very high long-term radial velocity accuracy (on the order of 1 m/s).

==== New Technology Telescope ====
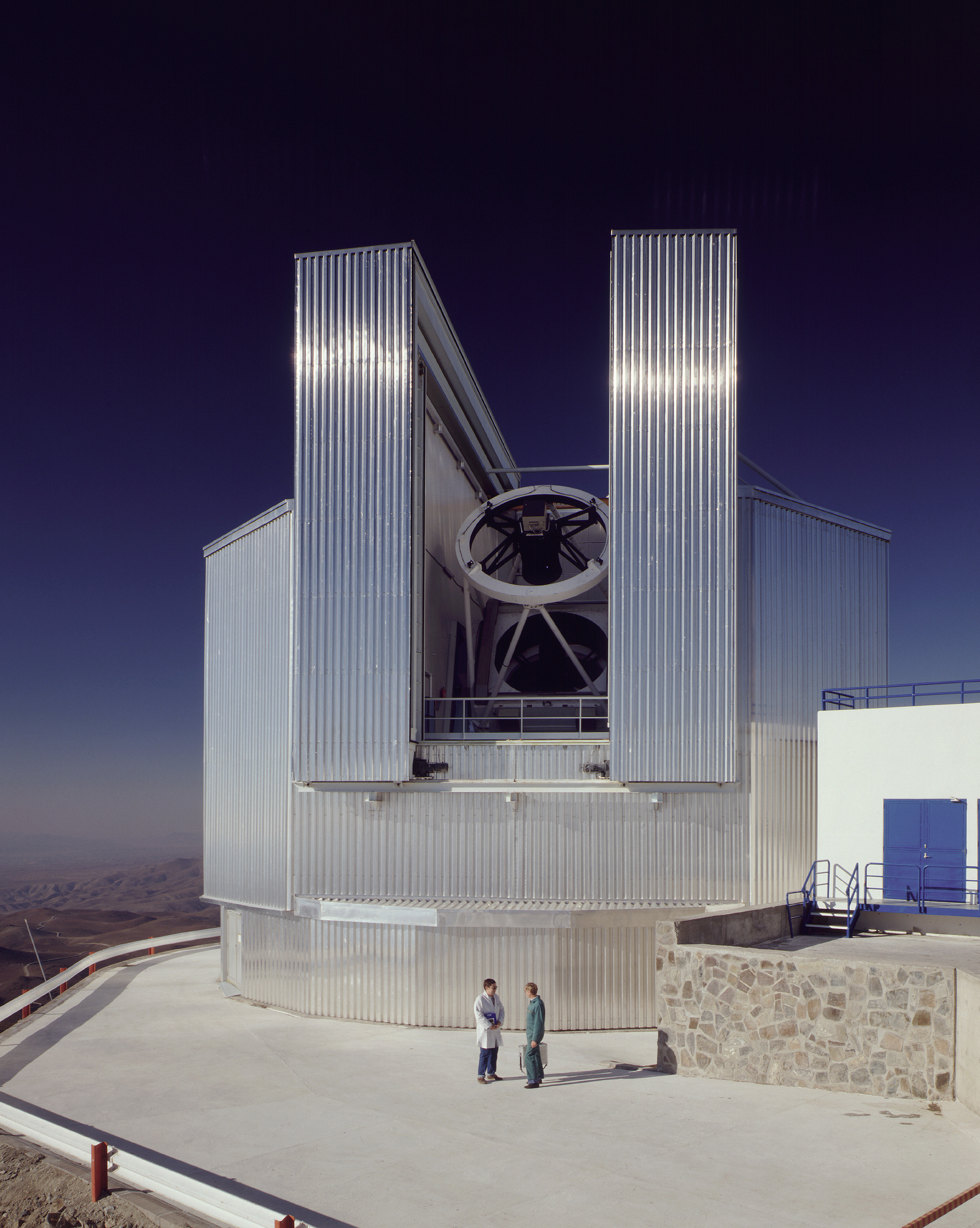
The New Technology Telescope

The New Technology Telescope (NTT) is an altazimuth, 3.58-metre Ritchey–Chrétien telescope, inaugurated in 1989 and the first in the world with a computer-controlled main mirror. The flexible mirror's shape is adjusted during observation to preserve optimal image quality. The secondary mirror position is also adjustable in three directions. This technology (developed by ESO and known as active optics) is now applied to all major telescopes, including the VLT and the future ELT.

The design of the octagonal enclosure housing the NTT is innovative. The telescope dome is relatively small and ventilated by a system of flaps directing airflow smoothly across the mirror, reducing turbulence and resulting in sharper images.

==== MPG/ESO 2.2-metre telescope ====
The 2.2-metre telescope has been in operation at La Silla since early 1984, and is on indefinite loan to ESO from the Max Planck Society (Max-Planck-Gesellschaft zur Förderung der Wissenschaften, or MPG, in German). Telescope time is shared between MPG and ESO observing programmes, while operation and maintenance of the telescope are ESO's responsibility.

Its instrumentation includes a 67-million-pixel wide-field imager (WFI) with a field of view as large as the full moon, which has taken many images of celestial objects. Other instruments used are GROND (Gamma-Ray Burst Optical Near-Infrared Detector), which seeks the afterglow of gamma-ray bursts—the most powerful explosions in the universe, and the high-resolution spectrograph FEROS (Fiber-fed Extended Range Optical Spectrograph), used to make detailed studies of stars.

==== Other telescopes ====
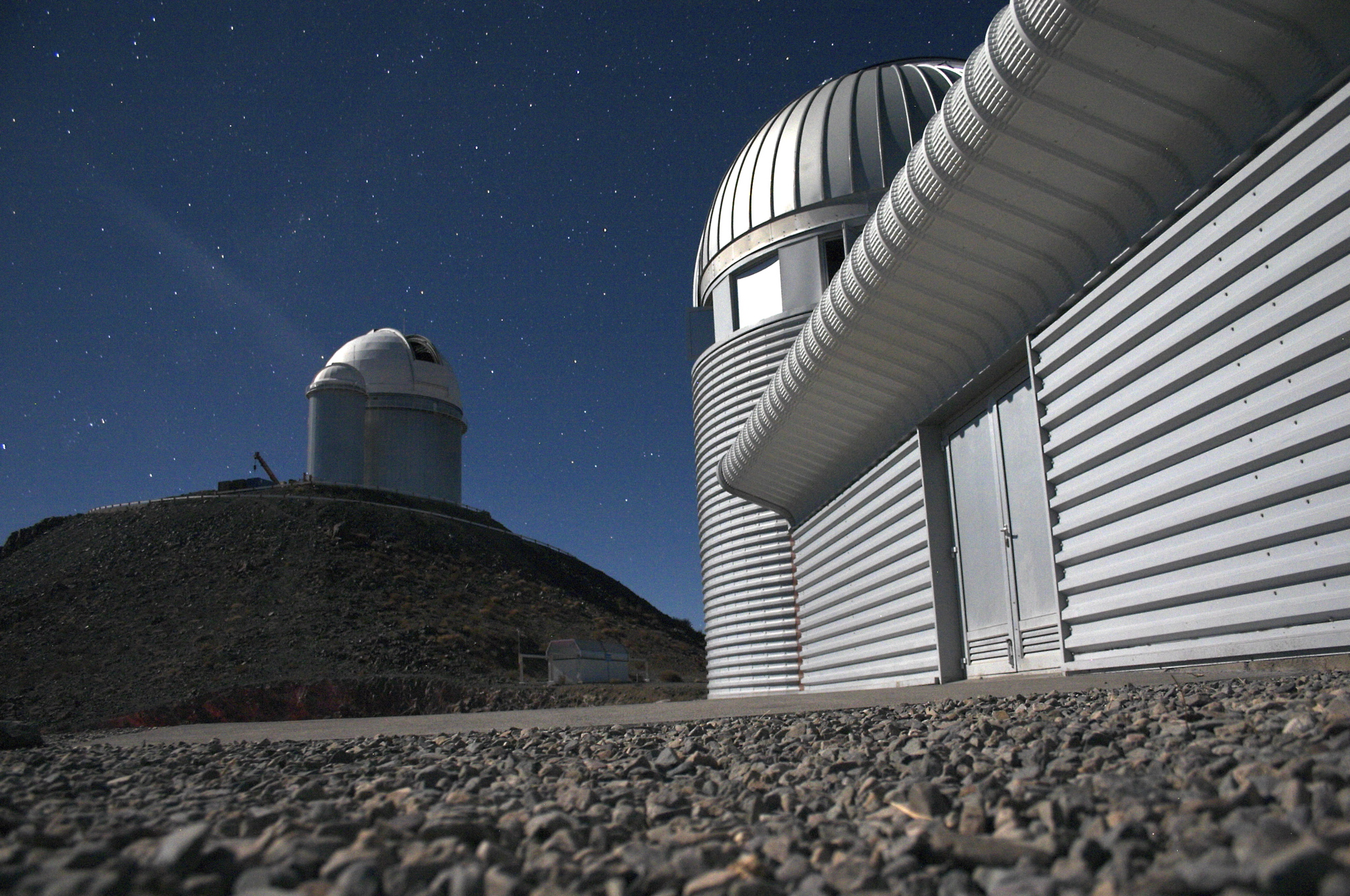
The Euler Telescope and the ESO 3.6-m Telescope (background) have discovered many exoplanets.

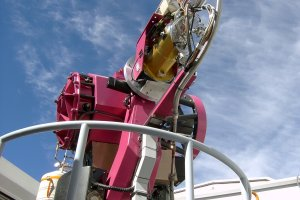
The Rapid Eye Mount telescope

La Silla also hosts several national and project telescopes not operated by ESO. Among them are the Swiss Euler Telescope, the Danish National Telescope and the REM, TRAPPIST and TAROT telescopes.

- The Euler Telescope is a 1.2-metre telescope built and operated by the Geneva Observatory in Switzerland. It is used to conduct high-precision radial velocity measurements primarily used in the search for large extrasolar planets in the southern celestial hemisphere. Its first discovery was a planet orbiting Gliese 86. Other observing programmes focus on variable stars, asteroseismology, gamma-ray bursts, monitoring active galactic nuclei (AGN) and gravitational lenses.
- The 1.54-metre Danish National Telescope was built by Grubb-Parsons and has been in use at La Silla since 1979. The telescope has an off-axis mount, and the optics are a Ritchey-Chrétien design. Because of the telescope's mount and limited space inside the dome, it has significant pointing restrictions.

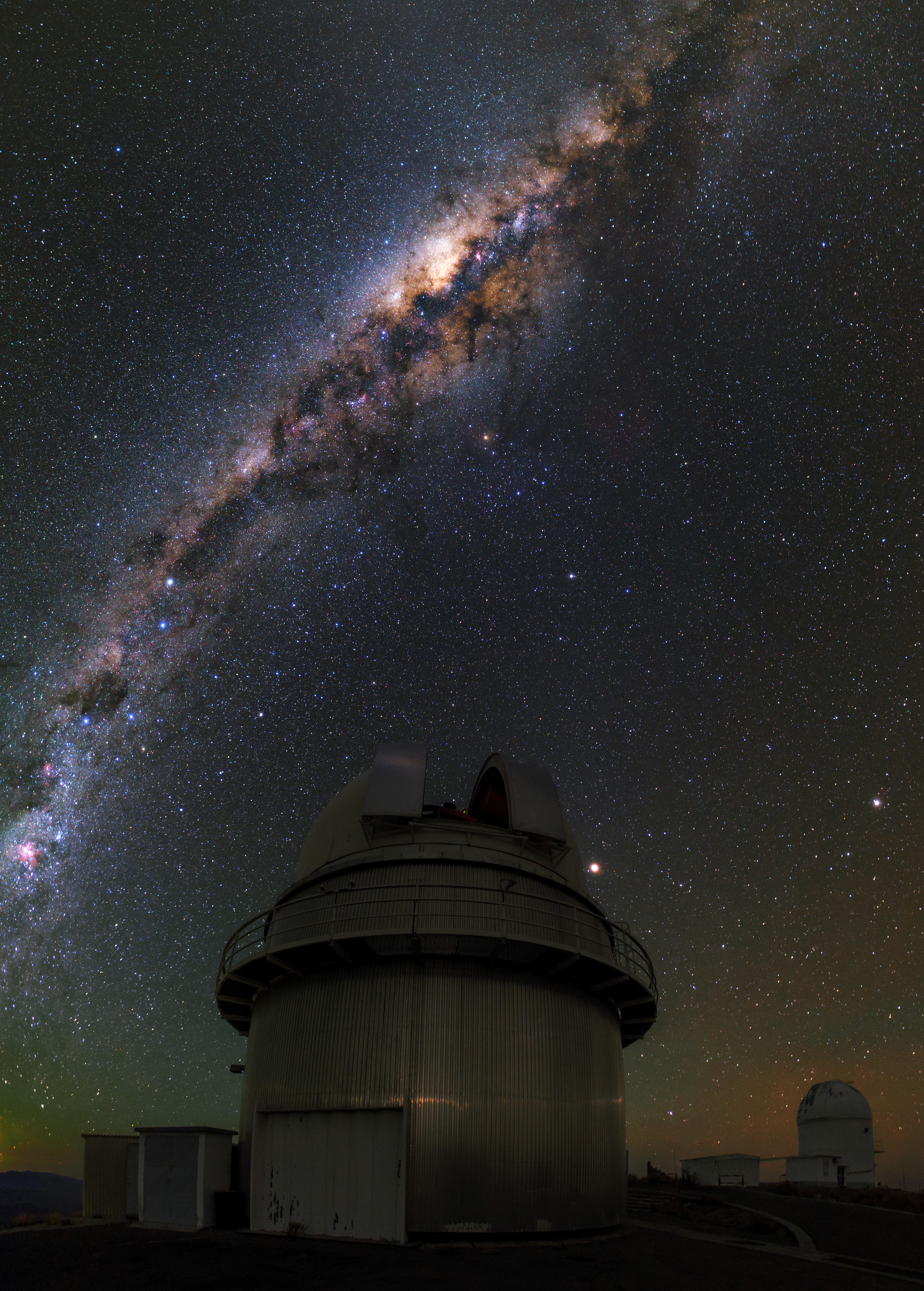
Dome of the Danish 1.54-metre telescope that has been in operation at La Silla Observatory since 1979

- The Rapid Eye Mount telescope is a small rapid-reaction automatic telescope with a primary 60-centimetre (24 in) mirror. The telescope, in an altazimuth mount, began operation in October 2002. The primary purpose of the telescope is to follow the afterglow of the GRBs detected by the Swift Gamma-Ray Burst Mission satellite.
- The Belgian TRAPPIST is a joint venture between the University of Liège and Geneva Observatory. The 0.60-metre telescope is specialised in comets, exoplanets, and was one of the few telescopes that observed a stellar occultation of the dwarf planet Eris, revealing that it may be smaller than Pluto.
- The Quick-action telescope for transient objects, TAROT, is a very fast-moving optical robotic telescope able to observe a gamma-ray burst from its beginning. Satellites detecting GRBs send signals to TAROT, which can provide a sub-arc second position to the astronomical community. Data from the TAROT telescope is also useful in studying the evolution of GRBs, the physics of a fireball and its surrounding material. It is operated from the Haute-Provence Observatory in France.

=== Paranal ===
The Paranal Observatory is located atop Cerro Paranal in the Atacama Desert in northern Chile. Cerro Paranal is a 2,635-metre-high (8,645 ft) mountain about 120 kilometres (75 mi) south of Antofagasta and 12 kilometres (7.5 mi) from the Pacific coast.

The observatory has seven major telescopes operating in visible and infrared light: the four 8.2-metre (27 ft) telescopes of the Very Large Telescope, the 2.6-metre (8 ft 6 in) VLT Survey Telescope (VST) and the 4.1-metre (13 ft) Visible and Infrared Survey Telescope for Astronomy. In addition, there are four 1.8-metre (5 ft 11 in) auxiliary telescopes forming an array used for interferometric observations. In March 2008, Paranal was the location for several scenes of the 22nd James Bond film, Quantum of Solace.

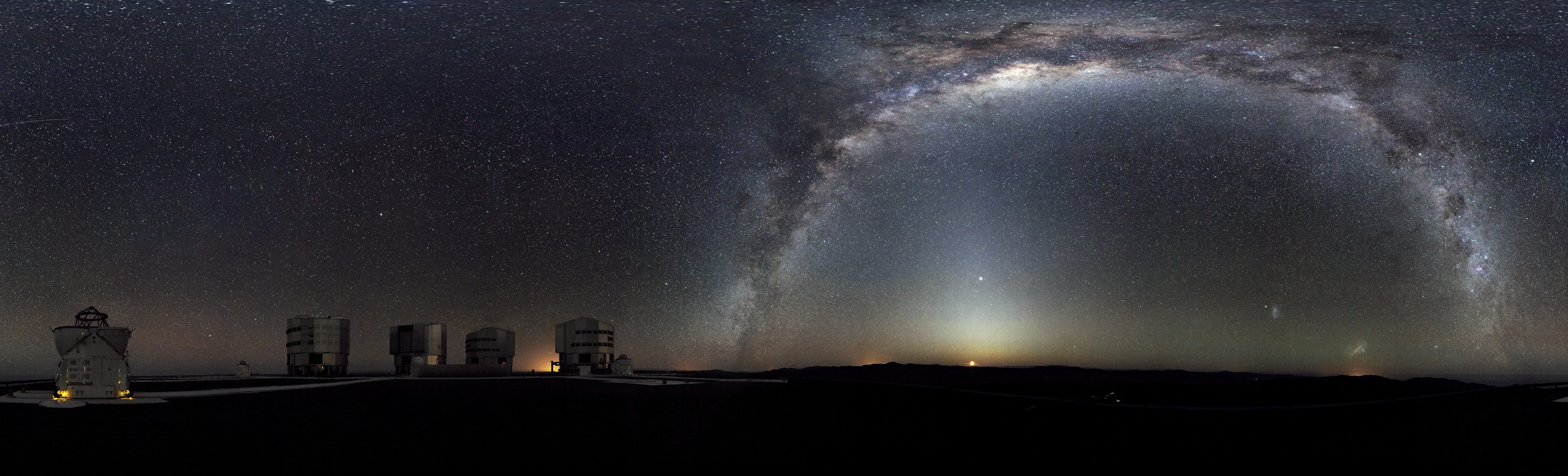
A 360-degree panoramic view of the southern night sky from Paranal, with telescopes in foreground

==== Very Large Telescope ====
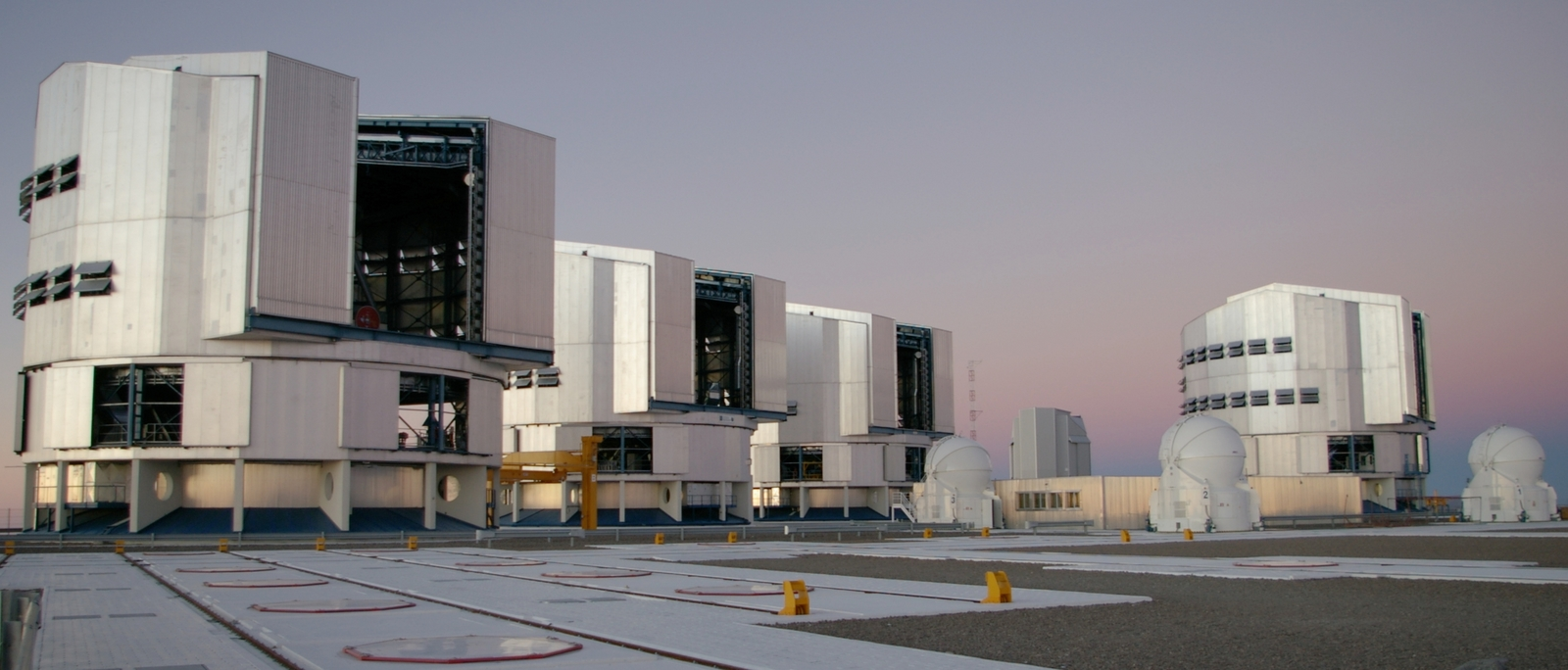
Very Large Telescope (VLT). Complex of four large telescopes and several smaller ones.

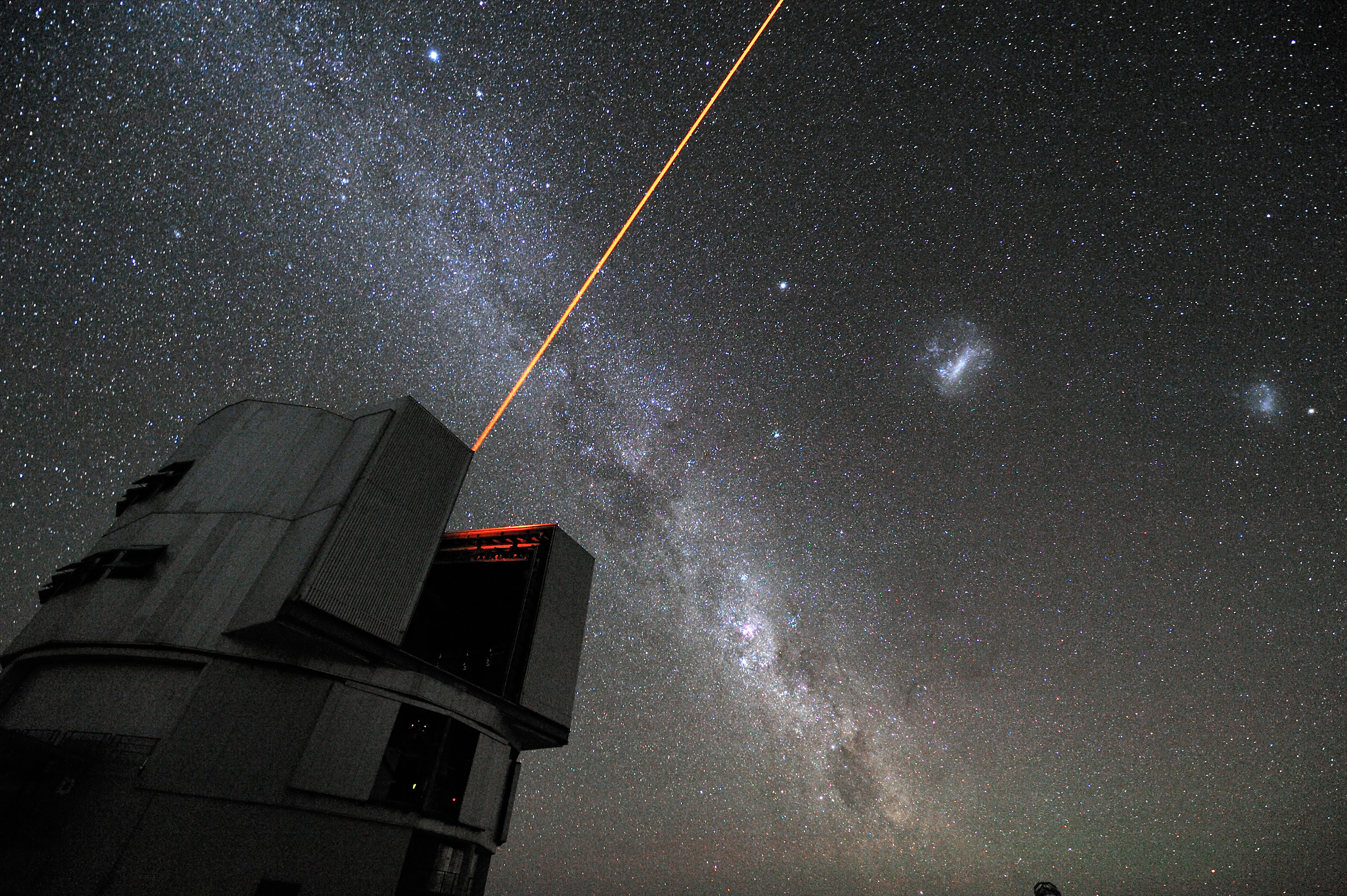
VLT Laser Guide Star. The orange laser beam from the telescope is used for adaptive optics.

The main facility at Paranal is the VLT, which consists of four nearly identical 8.2-metre (27 ft) unit telescopes (UTs), each hosting two or three instruments. These large telescopes can also work together in groups of two or three as a giant interferometer. The ESO Very Large Telescope Interferometer (VLTI) allows astronomers to see details up to 25 times finer than those seen with the individual telescopes. The light beams are combined in the VLTI with a complex system of mirrors in tunnels, where the light paths must diverge less than 1/1000 mm over 100 metres. The VLTI can achieve an angular resolution of milliarcseconds, equivalent to the ability to see the headlights of a car on the Moon.

The first of the UTs had its first light in May 1998, and was offered to the astronomical community on 1 April 1999. The other telescopes followed suit in 1999 and 2000, making the VLT fully operational. Four 1.8-metre auxiliary telescopes (ATs), installed between 2004 and 2007, have been added to the VLTI for accessibility when the UTs are used for other projects.

Data from the VLT have led to the publication of an average of more than one peer-reviewed scientific paper per day; in 2017, over 600 reviewed scientific papers were published based on VLT data. The VLT's scientific discoveries include imaging an extrasolar planet, tracking individual stars moving around the supermassive black hole at the centre of the Milky Way and observing the afterglow of the furthest known gamma-ray burst.

At the Paranal inauguration in March 1999, names of celestial objects in the Mapuche language were chosen to replace the technical designations of the four VLT Unit Telescopes (UT1–UT4). An essay contest was prior arranged for schoolchildren in the region concerning the meaning of these names which attracted many entries dealing with the cultural heritage of ESO's host country. A 17-year-old adolescent from Chuquicamata, near Calama, submitted the winning essay and was awarded an amateur telescope during the inauguration. The four unit telescopes, UT1, UT2, UT3 and UT4, are since known as Antu (sun), Kueyen (moon), Melipal (Southern Cross), and Yepun (Evening Star), with the latter having been originally mistranslated as "Sirius", instead of "Venus".

==== Survey telescopes ====
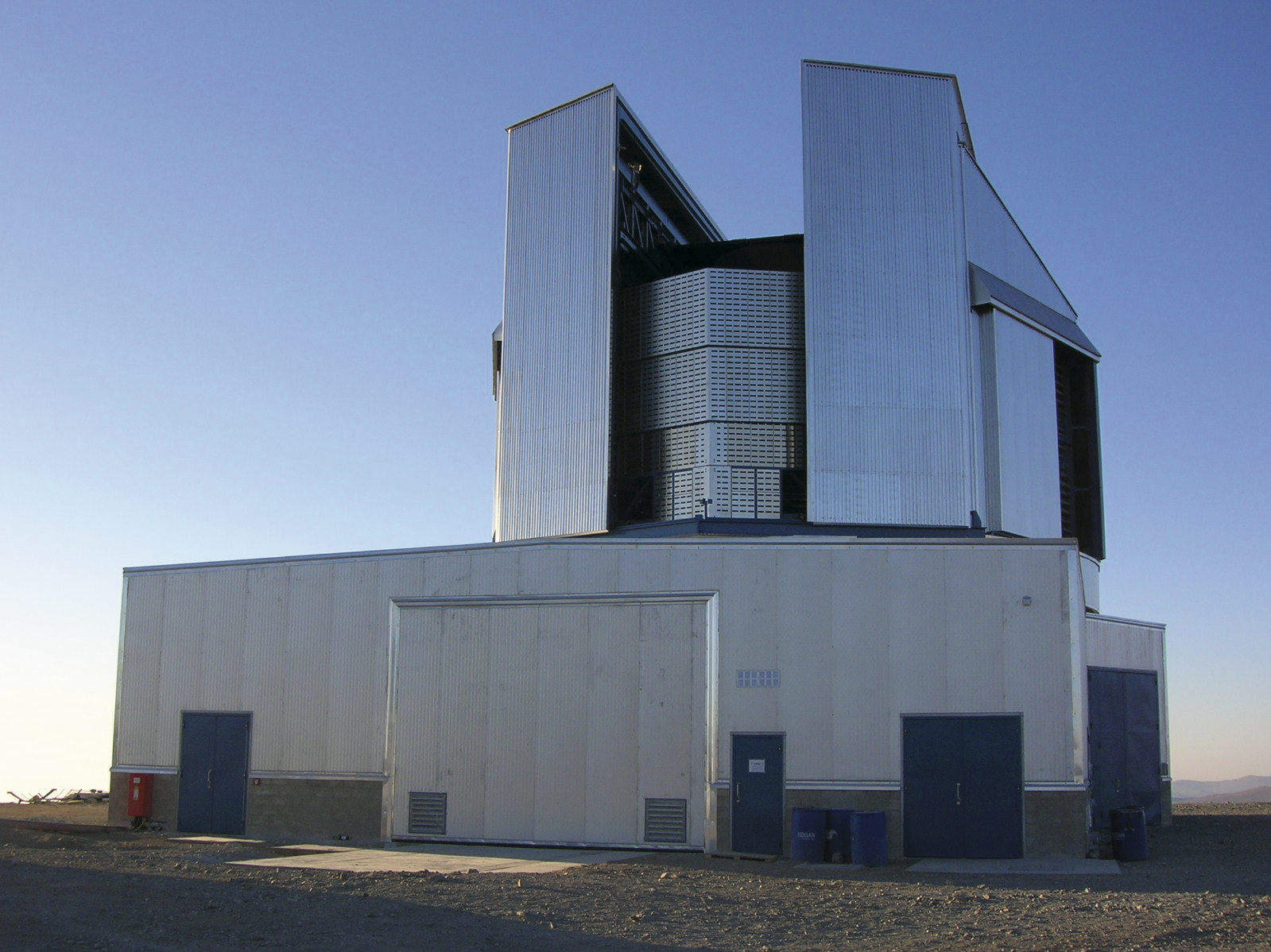
Enclosure of British developed VISTA

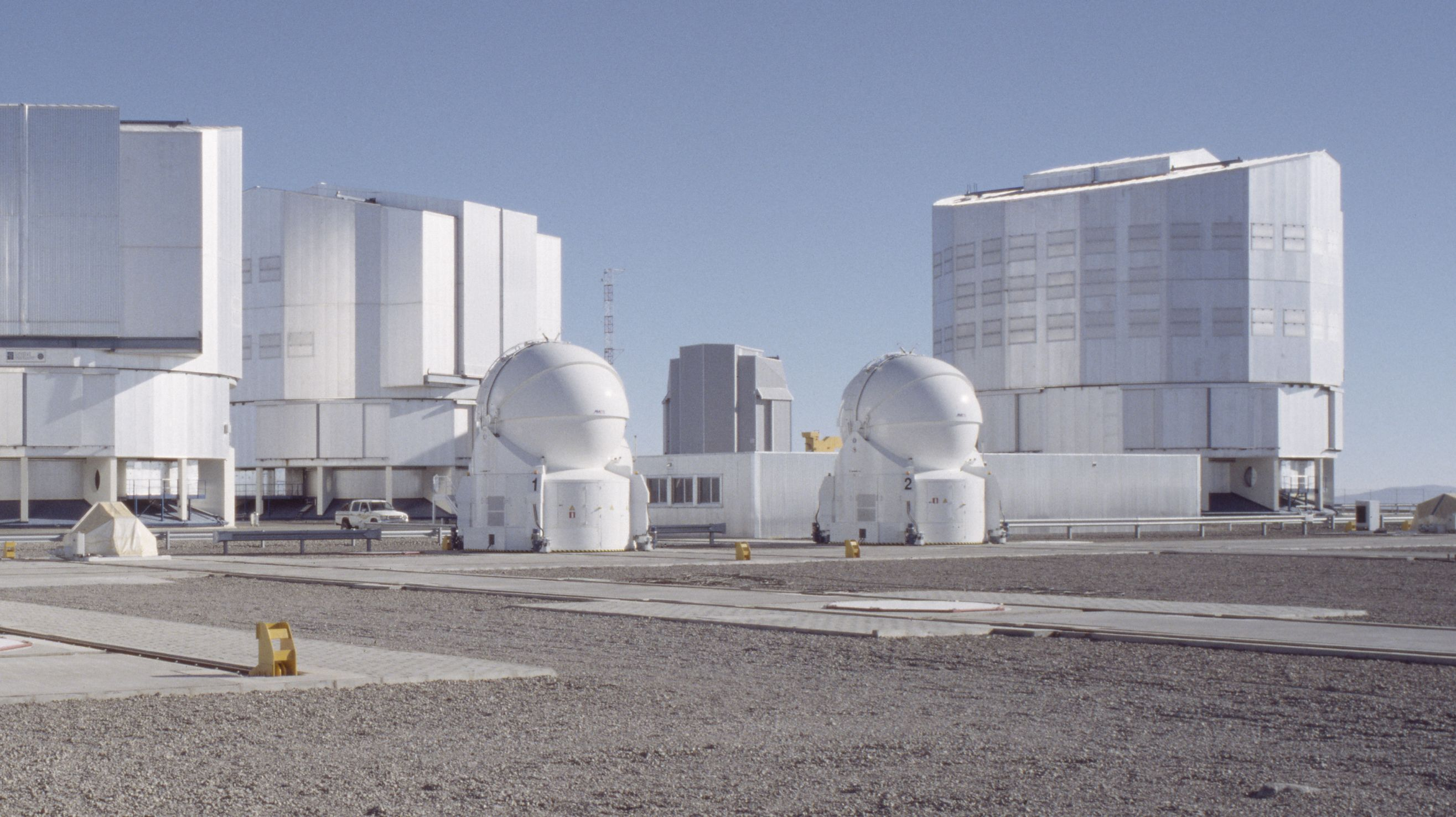
VST seen in the back between VLT's dome-shaped auxiliary telescopes

Visible and Infrared Survey Telescope for Astronomy (VISTA) is housed on the peak adjacent to the one hosting the VLT, sharing observational conditions. VISTA's main mirror is 4.1 metres (13 ft) across, a highly curved mirror for its size and quality. Its deviations from a perfect surface are less than a few thousandths the thickness of a human hair, and its construction and polishing presented a challenge.

VISTA was conceived and developed by a consortium of 18 universities in the United Kingdom led by Queen Mary, University of London, and it became an in-kind contribution to ESO as part of the UK's ratification agreement. The telescope's design and construction were managed by the Science and Technology Facilities Council's UK Astronomy Technology Centre (STFC, UK ATC). Provisional acceptance of VISTA was formally granted by ESO at the December 2009 ceremony at ESO headquarters in Garching, which was attended by representatives of Queen Mary, University of London and STFC. Since then the telescope has been operated by ESO, capturing quality images since it began operation.

The VLT Survey Telescope (VST) is a state-of-the-art, 2.6-metre (8 ft 6 in) telescope equipped with OmegaCAM, a 268-megapixel CCD camera with a field of view four times the area of the full moon. It complements VISTA by surveying the sky in visible light. The VST (which became operational in 2011) is the result of a joint venture between ESO and the Astronomical Observatory of Capodimonte (Naples), a research centre at the Italian National Institute for Astrophysics INAF.

The scientific goals of both surveys range from the nature of dark energy to assessing near-Earth objects. Teams of European astronomers will conduct the surveys; some will cover most of the southern sky, while others will focus on smaller areas. VISTA and the VST are expected to produce large amounts of data; a single picture taken by VISTA has 67 megapixels, and images from OmegaCam (on the VST) will have 268 megapixels. The two survey telescopes collect more data every night than all the other instruments on the VLT combined. The VST and VISTA produce more than 100 terabytes of data per year.

=== Llano de Chajnantor ===
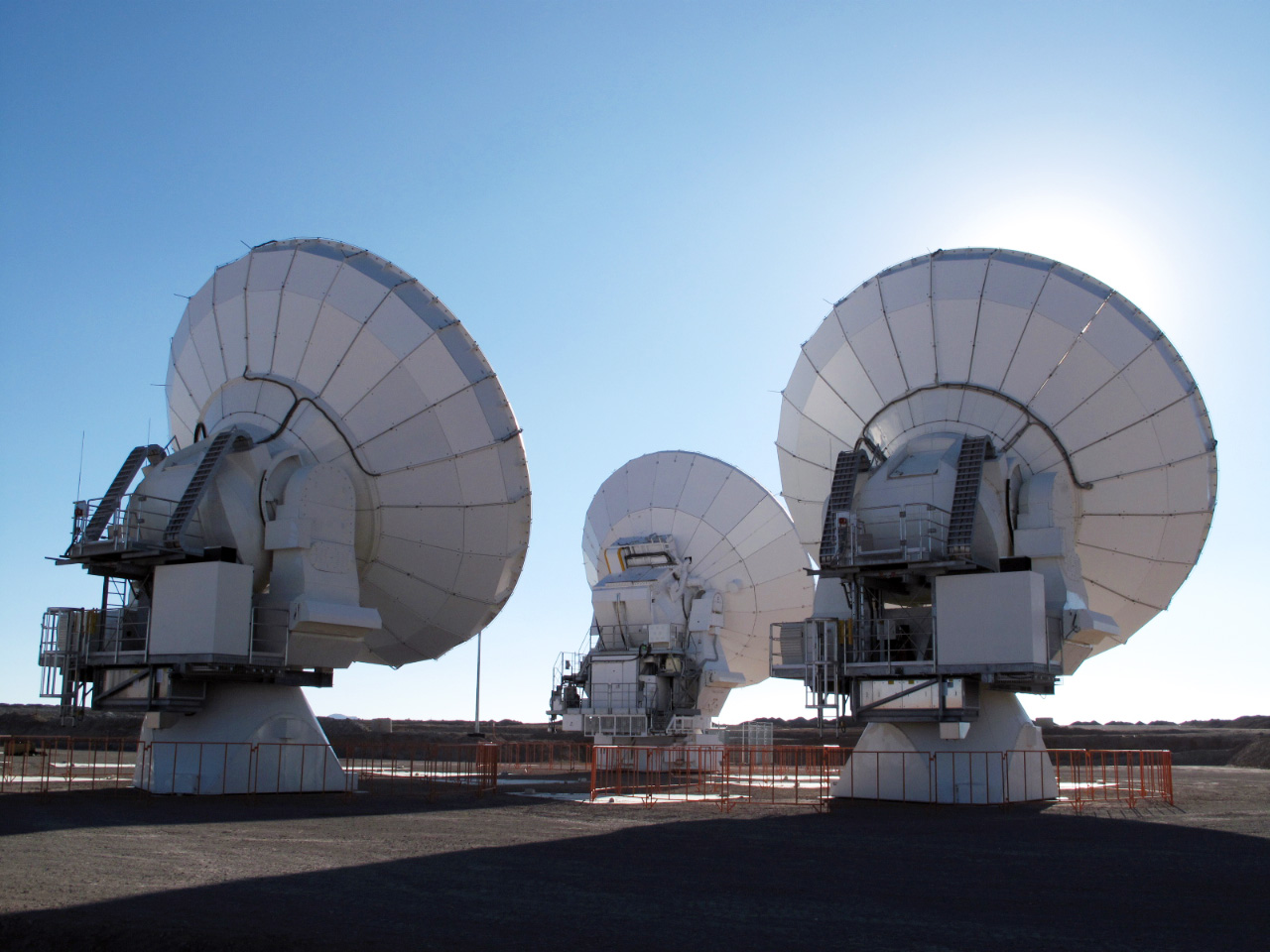
Three ALMA antennas on Chajnantor

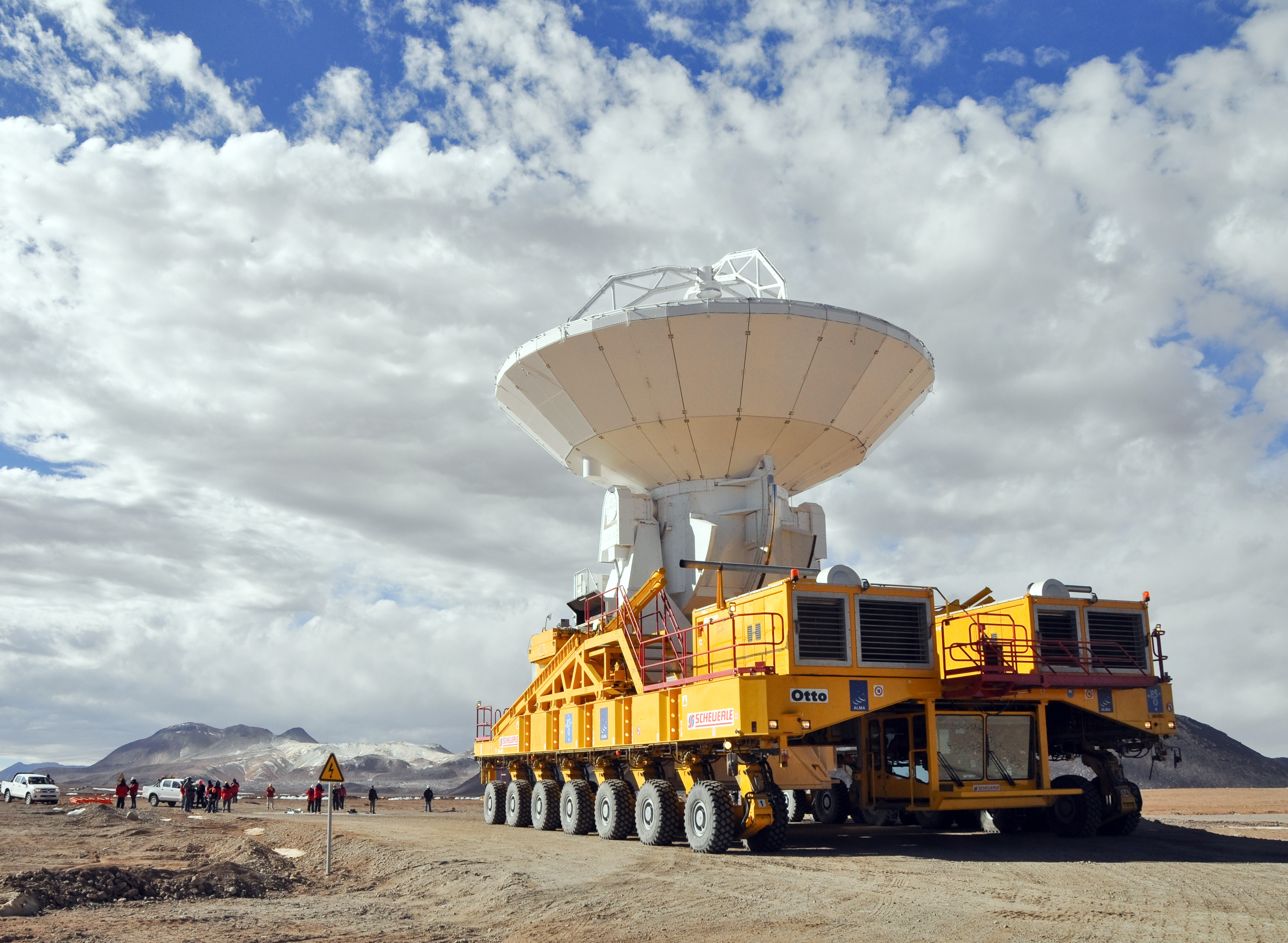
ALMA antenna on route to Chajnantor plateau

The Llano de Chajnantor is a 5,100-metre-high (16,700 ft) plateau in the Atacama Desert, about 50 kilometres (31 mi) east of San Pedro de Atacama. The site is 750 metres (2,460 ft) higher than the Mauna Kea Observatory and 2,400 metres (7,900 ft) higher than the Very Large Telescope on Cerro Paranal. It is dry and inhospitable to humans, but a good site for submillimetre astronomy; because water vapour molecules in Earth's atmosphere absorb and attenuate submillimetre radiation, a dry site is required for this type of radio astronomy. The telescopes are:

- Atacama Cosmology Telescope (ACT; not operated by ESO)
- Atacama Pathfinder Experiment (Operated on behalf of the Max Planck Institute for Radio Astronomy (MPIfR))
- Atacama Large Millimeter Array
- Q/U Imaging Experiment (QUIET; not operated by ESO)
- POLARBEAR (on the Huan Tran Telescope; not operated by ESO)

ALMA is a telescope designed for millimetre and submillimetre astronomy. This type of astronomy is a relatively unexplored frontier, revealing a universe which cannot be seen in more-familiar visible or infrared light and ideal for studying the "cold universe"; light at these wavelengths shines from vast cold clouds in interstellar space at temperatures only a few tens of degrees above absolute zero. Astronomers use this light to study the chemical and physical conditions in these molecular clouds, the dense regions of gas and cosmic dust where new stars are being born. Seen in visible light, these regions of the universe are often dark and obscure due to dust; however, they shine brightly in the millimetre and submillimetre portions of the electromagnetic spectrum. This wavelength range is also ideal for studying some of the earliest (and most distant) galaxies in the universe, whose light has been redshifted into longer wavelengths from the expansion of the universe.

==== Atacama Pathfinder Experiment ====
ESO hosts the Atacama Pathfinder Experiment, APEX, and operates it on behalf of the Max Planck Institute for Radio Astronomy (MPIfR). APEX is a 12-metre (39 ft) diameter telescope, operating at millimetre and submillimetre wavelengths—between infrared light and radio waves.

==== Atacama Large Millimeter/submillimeter Array ====
ALMA is an astronomical interferometer initially composed of 66 high-precision antennas and operating at wavelengths of 0.3 to 3.6 mm. Its main array will have 50 12-metre (39 ft) antennas acting as a single interferometer. An additional compact array of four 12-metre and twelve 7-metre (23 ft) antennas, known as the Morita array is also available. The antennas can be arranged across the desert plateau over distances from 150 metres to 16 kilometres (9.9 mi), which will give ALMA a variable "zoom". The array will be able to probe the universe at millimetre and submillimeter wavelengths with unprecedented sensitivity and resolution, with vision up to ten times sharper than the Hubble Space Telescope. These images will complement those made with the VLT Interferometer. ALMA is a collaboration between East Asia (Japan and Taiwan), Europe (ESO), North America (US and Canada) and Chile.

The scientific goals of ALMA include studying the origin and formation of stars, galaxies, and planets with observations of molecular gas and dust, studying distant galaxies towards the edge of the observable universe and studying relic radiation from the Big Bang. A call for ALMA science proposals was issued on 31 March 2011, and early observations began on 3 October.

== Outreach ==
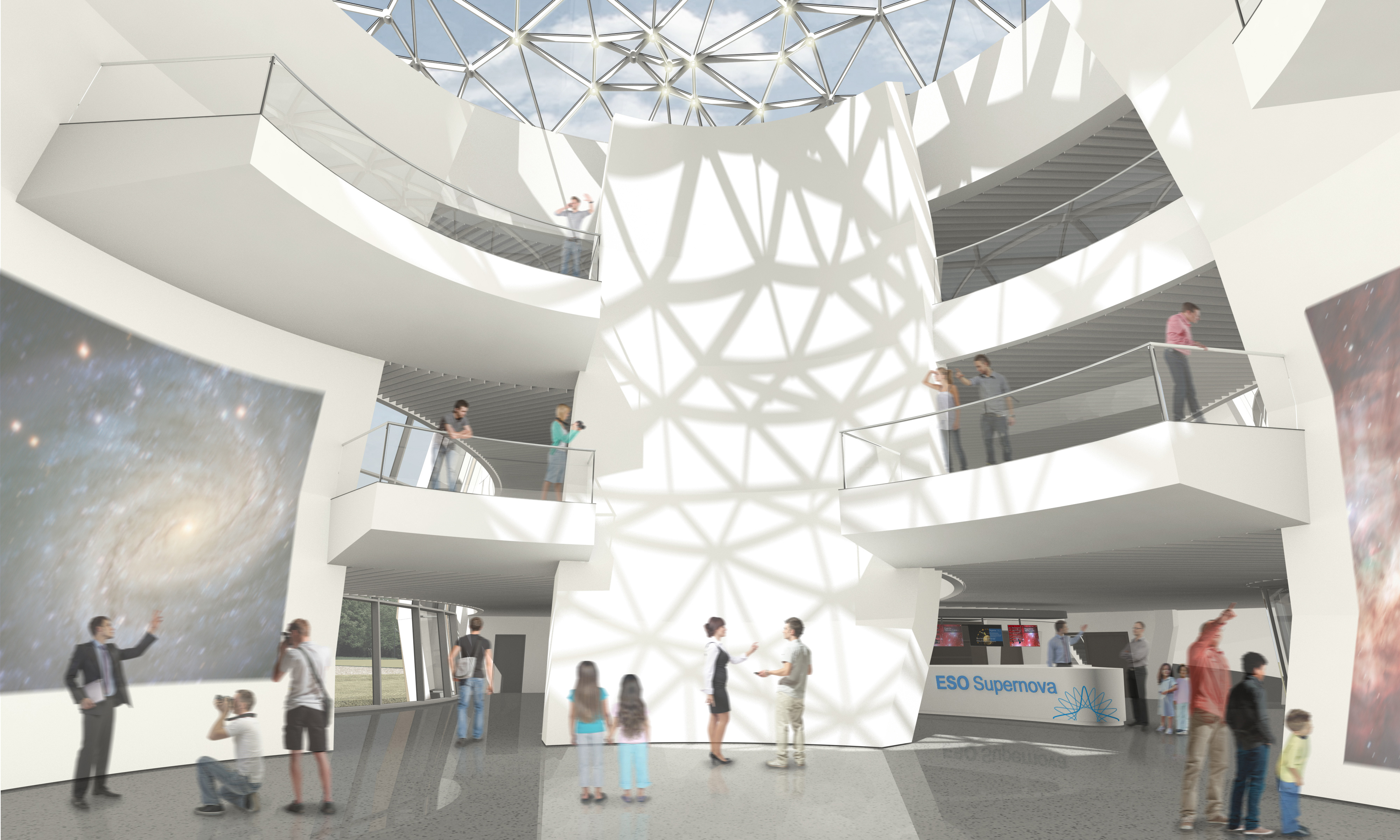
Artist's impression of ESO Supernova Planetarium & Visitor Centre

Outreach activities are carried out by the ESO education and Public Outreach Department (ePOD).

ePOD also manages the ESO Supernova Planetarium & Visitor Centre, an astronomy centre located at the site of the ESO Headquarters in Garching bei München, which was inaugurated 26 April 2018.

== Video gallery ==
ESO's 50th-anniversary event (Munich Residenz in Germany, 11 October 2012)

ESO's first 50 years of exploring the southern sky

José Manuel Barroso visits the ESO in January 2013.

Tim de Zeeuw talks on ESO and its 50th anniversary.

The temporary office buildings at the ESO headquarters in Garching being dismantled

Timelapses of ESO's VLT, ALMA and La Silla site

== See also ==
- Cerro Tololo Inter-American Observatory, U.S. main site in Chile
- Extremely Large Telescope, ESO's largest telescope under construction
- European Northern Observatory, name of a Spanish group of observatories which is a word play on ESO
- Roque de los Muchachos Observatory, telescopes on the Canary Islands, Spain
- Teide Observatory, telescopes on the Canary Islands, Spain
- CERN
- HD 155448
- Paolo Padovani
- Simone Zaggia
- VVV Survey

== Bibliography ==
- Shaw, E. N. (1976). "The European Southern Observatory". The Observatory. London: Royal Astronomical Society.
- Council of Europe (2010). European Yearbook / Annuaire Européen. Vol. 58. Martinus Nijhoff Publishers. p. cdxliii. ISBN 978-9004206793.
- Lodewijk, Woltjer (2012). Europe's Quest for The Universe. EDP Sciences. ISBN 9782759801671.
- Schilling, Govert; Christensen, Lars Lindberg (2013). Europe to the Stars: ESO's first 50 years of exploring the southern sky. John Wiley & Sons. ISBN 9783527671670.
