= Xavier Barcons =

Spanish physicist and astronomer

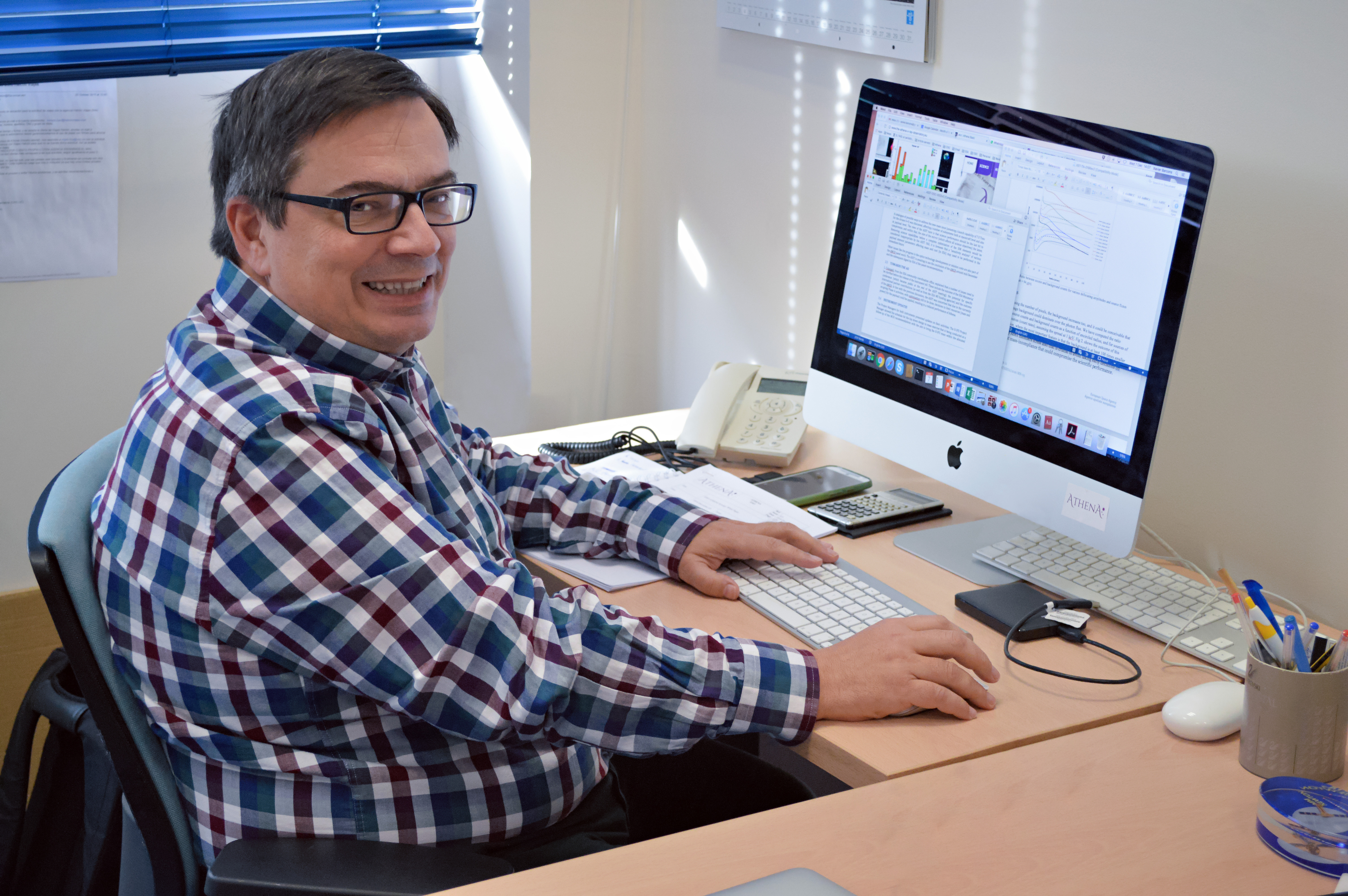
- Prof. Xavier Barcons at ESO Headquarters
- Born: Xavier Barcons Jáuregui; 1959 (age 66–67); Hospitalet de Llobregat, Spain
- Education: University of Cantabria
- Occupation: Astronomer
- Known for: ESO General Director
- Children: 2

Xavier Barcons Jáuregui is a Spanish physicist and astronomer appointed as ESO director general from 1 September 2017.

On 29 May 2018, the asteroid 327943 Xavierbarcons was named in his honor.

== See also ==
- European Southern Observatory
