= HD 155448 =

Quintuple star system in the constellation Scorpius

Observation data Epoch J2000.0 Equinox J2000.0 (ICRS)
- Constellation: Scorpius
- Right ascension: 17^{h} 12^{m} 58.7680^{s}
- Declination: −32° 14′ 33.5690″
- Apparent magnitude (V): 8.72

Characteristics

HD 155448 A
- Evolutionary stage: Main sequence
- Spectral type: B1 V
- B−V color index: −0.27±0.02

HD 155448Ba
- Evolutionary stage: main sequence star
- Spectral type: B6V
- B−V color index: −0.15±0.02

HD 155448 Bb
- Evolutionary stage: main sequence star
- Spectral type: B9V
- B−V color index: −0.08±0.02

HD 155448 C
- Evolutionary stage: Main sequence
- Spectral type: B4 Ve
- B−V color index: −0.19±0.02

HD 155448 D
- Evolutionary stage: Main sequence
- Spectral type: B8 V
- B−V color index: −0.11±0.02

Astrometry

A
Proper motion (μ)	RA: +2.551 mas/yr Dec.: –1.666 mas/yr
Parallax (π)	0.9566±0.0440 mas
Distance	3,400 ± 200 ly (1,050 ± 50 pc)

B
Proper motion (μ)	RA: +1.758 mas/yr Dec.: −1.520 mas/yr
Parallax (π)	0.8401±0.0384 mas
Distance	3,900 ± 200 ly (1,190 ± 50 pc)

D
Proper motion (μ)	RA: +2.491 mas/yr Dec.: −1.567 mas/yr
Parallax (π)	0.7837±0.0263 mas
Distance	4,200 ± 100 ly (1,280 ± 40 pc)

Details

A
Mass	>7 M_{☉}
Surface gravity (log g)	4 cgs
Temperature	25,000 K
Rotational velocity (v sin i)	90±5 km/s

Ba
Mass	5 M_{☉}
Surface gravity (log g)	4 cgs
Temperature	14,000 K
Rotational velocity (v sin i)	150±50 km/s

Bb
Mass	3 M_{☉}
Surface gravity (log g)	4 cgs
Temperature	10,000 K
Rotational velocity (v sin i)	150±50 km/s

C
Mass	6 M_{☉}
Surface gravity (log g)	4 cgs
Temperature	16,000 K
Rotational velocity (v sin i)	50±10 km/s

D
Mass	3.5 M_{☉}
Surface gravity (log g)	4 cgs
Temperature	12,000 K
Rotational velocity (v sin i)	300±15 km/s

Other designations
- CD−32°12461, HD 155448, HIP 84228, SAO 208540, WDS J17130-3215

Database references
SIMBAD	data
- B
- C
- D

HD 155448 is a quintuple star system consisting of 5 young B-type stars . With an apparent magnitude of 8.72, it is too dim to be visible with the naked eye.

Parallax measurements from the Hipparcos spacecraft in 1997 give the system a distance of 1,976 light years with a margin of error larger than the parallax itself. The New Hipparcos Reduction gives a distance of 6,272 light years, but still with a statistical margin of error larger than the parallax value. Gaia parallaxes are available for the visible components. For component C, the Gaia Data Release 2 and Gaia Early Data Release 3 (EDR3) parallaxes are both negative and somewhat meaningless. For components A, B, and D, the Gaia EDR3 parallaxes are 0.9566±0.0440 mas, 0.8401±0.0384 mas, and 0.7837±0.0263 mas respectively, implying a distance around 4,000 light years.

Before 2011, this star was mistaken as either a Herbig Ae/Be star or a post-AGB object. When the system was studied in 2011, it was originally believed to contain only 4 stars (or at least more than 2 stars). In 2011, a study conducted at the European Southern Observatory in Chile concluded that the "B" star is actually a binary star, thus reclassifying it as a quintuple star system. HD 155448 A, B, C, and D. Periods have been estimated at 27,000 years for Bab, 59,000 years for AB, 111,000 years for Ac, and 327,000 years for AD. However, analysis in 2011 states that the stars are not gravitationally bound to each other.

All of the stars are currently on the ZAMS. At present the primary star has a mass greater than 7 solar masses and an effective temperature of 25,000 K, while the companions have masses ranging from 3-6 times the mass of the Sun, and temperatures ranging from 10,000-16,000 K.
