= Paolo Padovani =

Italian astronomer

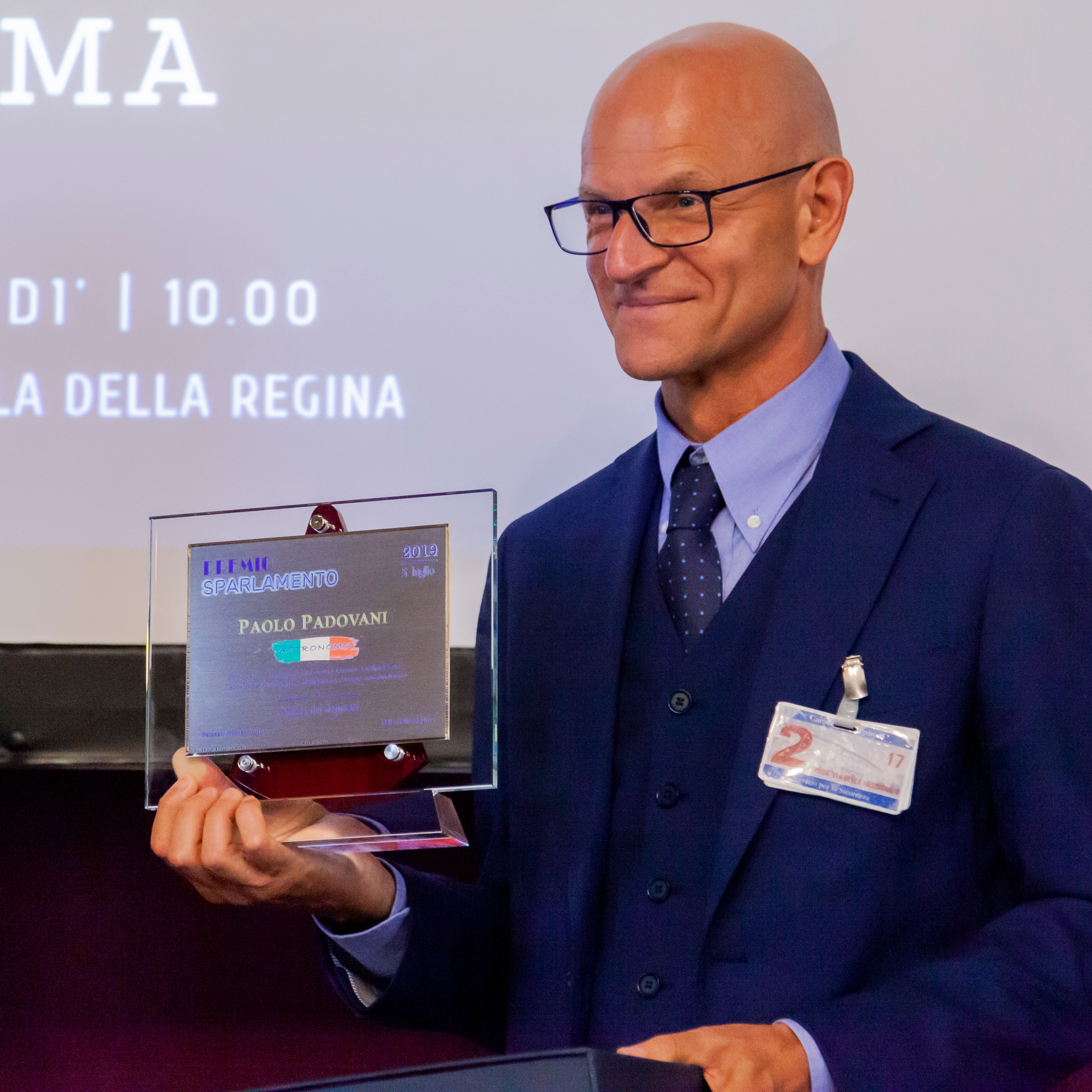
- Paolo Padovani at the Italian House of Parliament in Rome.
- Education: University of Padova, Ph.D. 1989
- Scientific career
- Fields: Astrophysics
- Workplaces: European Southern Observatory

Paolo Padovani is an Italian astronomer working at the European Southern Observatory (ESO), specializing in the study of active galactic nuclei, including the study of quasars and blazars, evolution and multifrequency studies, and extragalactic backgrounds. In 2004, he and several other astronomers discovered 30 supermassive black holes at the European Astrophysical Virtual Observatory using pioneering techniques.

== Biography ==
He received his Ph.D. in astronomy from the University of Padova in 1989. As head of the Virtual Observatory Project Office, he was part of the team that discovered 30 previously hidden supermassive black holes outside the Milky Way. He has published more than 100 peer-reviewed articles.

His research interests include active galactic nuclei radio sources, blazars, unified schemes and deep radio surveys. From 1997 to 2003, he worked as an archive scientist for the European Space Agency (ESA) at the Mikulski Archive for Space Telescopes (MAST) in Baltimore. In 2004, he became head of the VO systems department at ESO, and has headed the data management and operations division of the ESO since June 2008. He has been a member of the International Astronomical Union since 1994. Padovani worked with Meg Urry in the mid-1990s in the field of radio quasars and powerful radio galaxies.

In 2004, Padovani and several other astronomers at the Astrophysical Virtual Observatory (AVO), coordinated between the Space Telescope European Coordinating Facility and the European Southern Observatory in Munich, discovered 30 supermassive black holes that were previously obscured by dust clouds. It was the first scientific discovery to emerge from a Virtual Observatory. Padovani and the team used a pioneering technique in which they combined information from multiple wavelengths from the Hubble Space Telescope, ESO's telescope, and NASA's Chandra X-ray Observatory, and used virtual observatory tools. According to Paolo Padovani, "This discovery means that surveys of powerful supermassive black holes have so far underestimated their numbers by at least a factor of two, and possibly by up to a factor of five." According to Peter Quinn, director of the AVO, the virtual observatory observations are the future of astronomy and will facilitate more discoveries in the future."

In 2018, Padovani was involved in the association between IceCube neutrinos and the blazar TXS 0506+056 at redshift = 0.3365. This blazar is the first non-stellar neutrino source, as the only astronomical sources previously observed by neutrino detectors were the Sun and supernova 1987A, which were detected decades earlier at much lower neutrino energies.

In July 2019, Padovani was awarded the Sparlamento Prize in Research and Development 2019 for his contribution to enhancing Italian excellence in astronomy. The ceremony took place on 5 July 2019, at the Italian House of Parliament in Rome — the first time ever an astronomical ceremony was held in the building.
