= SEST =

SEST may refer to:

- Swedish-ESO Submillimetre Telescope, a radio telescope located in South America
- The ICAO airport code for San Cristóbal Airport on San Cristóbal Island in Ecuador
