= TOLIMAN =

Space telescope

- Mission type: Space telescope for narrow-angle astrometry
- Operator: (Australia) University of Sydney
- Website: toliman.space

Spacecraft properties
- Spacecraft type: 16U CubeSat
- Manufacturer: (Bulgaria) EnduroSat

Start of mission
- Launch date: 2027 (planned)

Orbital parameters
- Reference system: Geocentric

Main telescope
- Diameter: 12.5 cm

The TOLIMAN (Telescope for Orbit Locus Interferometric Monitoring of our Astronomical Neighbourhood) space telescope is a low-cost mission project aimed at detecting of exoplanets in the Alpha Centauri via the astrometry method. The mission involves scientists of the University of Sydney, Saber Astronautics in Australia, Breakthrough Initiatives, NASA's Jet Propulsion Laboratory, and the Astronomical Institute of the Czech Academy of Sciences. The mission's 16U CubeSat-type spacecraft is being manufactured by the Bulgarian company EnduroSat. TOLIMAN is expected to be launched in 2027.

== See also ==
- PLATOSpec – Astronomical instrument
