= Coudé Spectrograph =

Telescope instrument

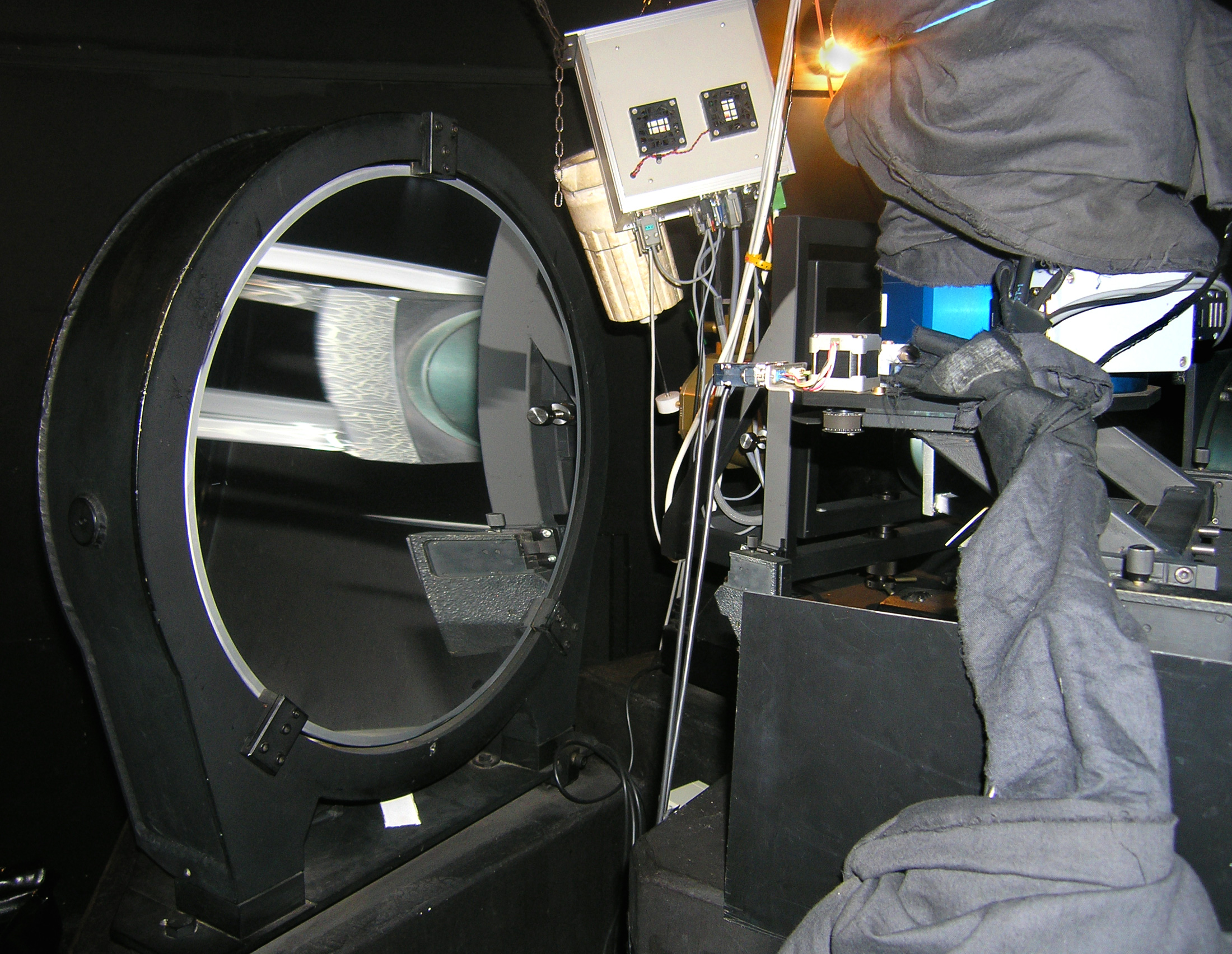
- Location: Decommissioned
- Organization: European Southern Observatory
- Wavelength: Total range 320 — 1010 nm on three cameras
- First light: May 1969
- Related media on Commons

The Coudé Spectrograph was an instrument attached to the coudé focus of the ESO 1.52-metre telescope (coudé is the French word for elbow). Three cameras equipped with photographic plates as detectors were available. It had two cameras working at f/6 and f/14. Dispersions from 1A/mm to 18a/mm are available with a selection of three gratings, each with ruled areas of 20 x 30 cm. The Coudé Spectrograph was installed at the coudé focus of the ESO 1.52-metre telescope at the La Silla Observatory in May 1969. It was decommissioned from the ESO 1.52-metre telescope in the mid 1980s.

== See also ==
- PLATOSpec
