= La Silla Observatory =

Astronomical observatory in Chile

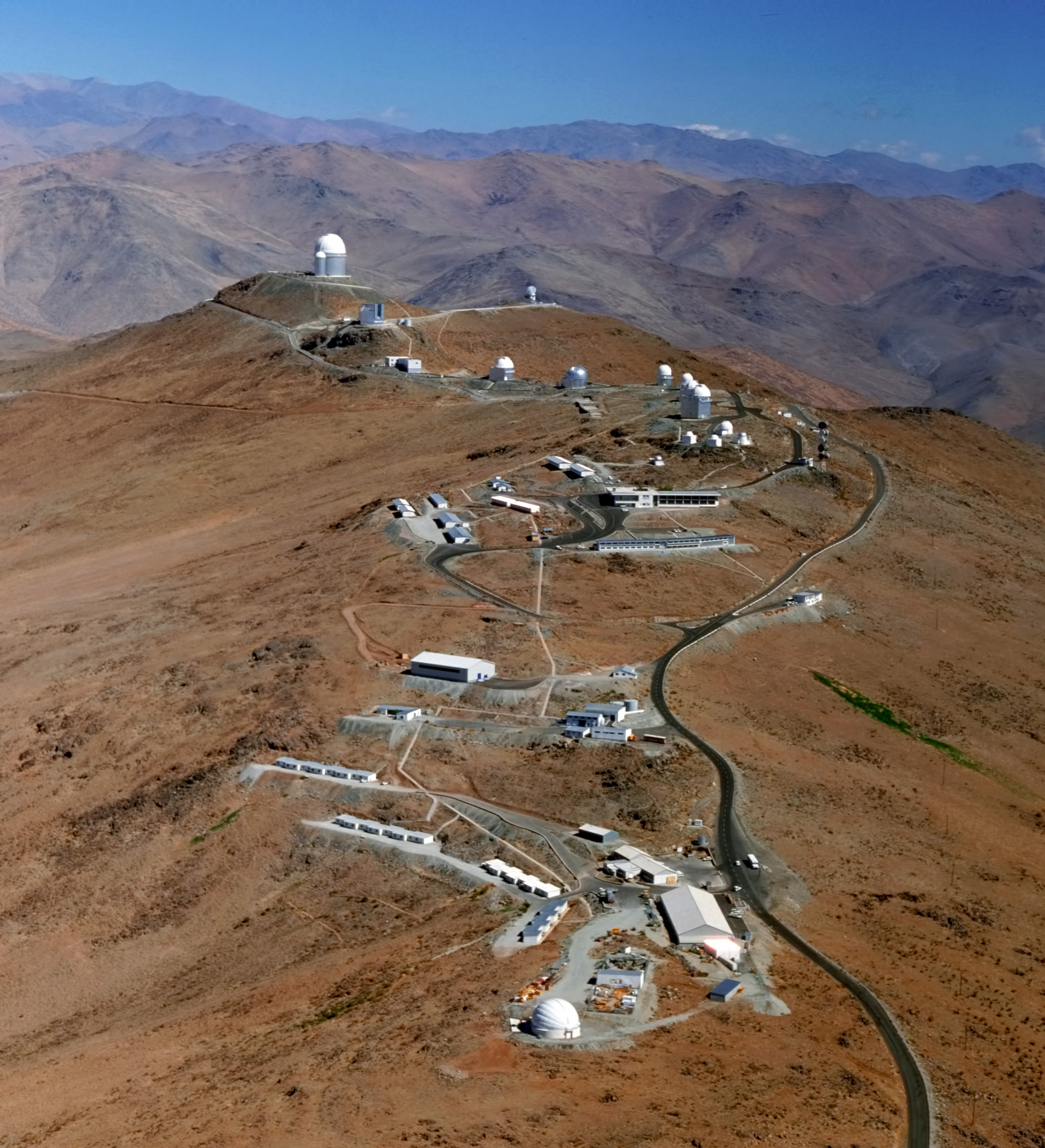
- Organization: European Southern Observatory
- Observatory code: 809
- Location: Coquimbo Region, Chile
- Coordinates: 29°15′27″S 70°44′15″W
- Altitude: 2,400 m (7,900 ft)
- Established: 1964
- Website: www.ls.eso.org/index.html
- Telescopes: ESO 1-m Schmidt telescope; BlackGEM; ESO 3.6 m Telescope; MASCARA; MPG/ESO telescope; New Technology Telescope; Rapid Eye Mount telescope; Swedish-ESO Submillimetre Telescope; Swiss 1.2-metre Leonhard Euler Telescope; TAROT-South robotic observatory; TRAPPIST
- Related media on Commons

La Silla Observatory is an astronomical observatory in Chile with three telescopes built and operated by the European Southern Observatory (ESO). Several other telescopes are also located at the site and are partly maintained by ESO. The observatory is one of the largest in the Southern Hemisphere and was the first in Chile to be used by ESO.

The La Silla telescopes and instruments are located in the North of the Coquimbo region, 150 km northeast of La Serena, on the outskirts of the Atacama Desert, one of the driest and most remote areas in the world. Like other observatories in this region, La Silla is far from sources of light pollution and, like the Paranal Observatory—home to the Very Large Telescope—it has some of the darkest night skies on Earth.

== History ==
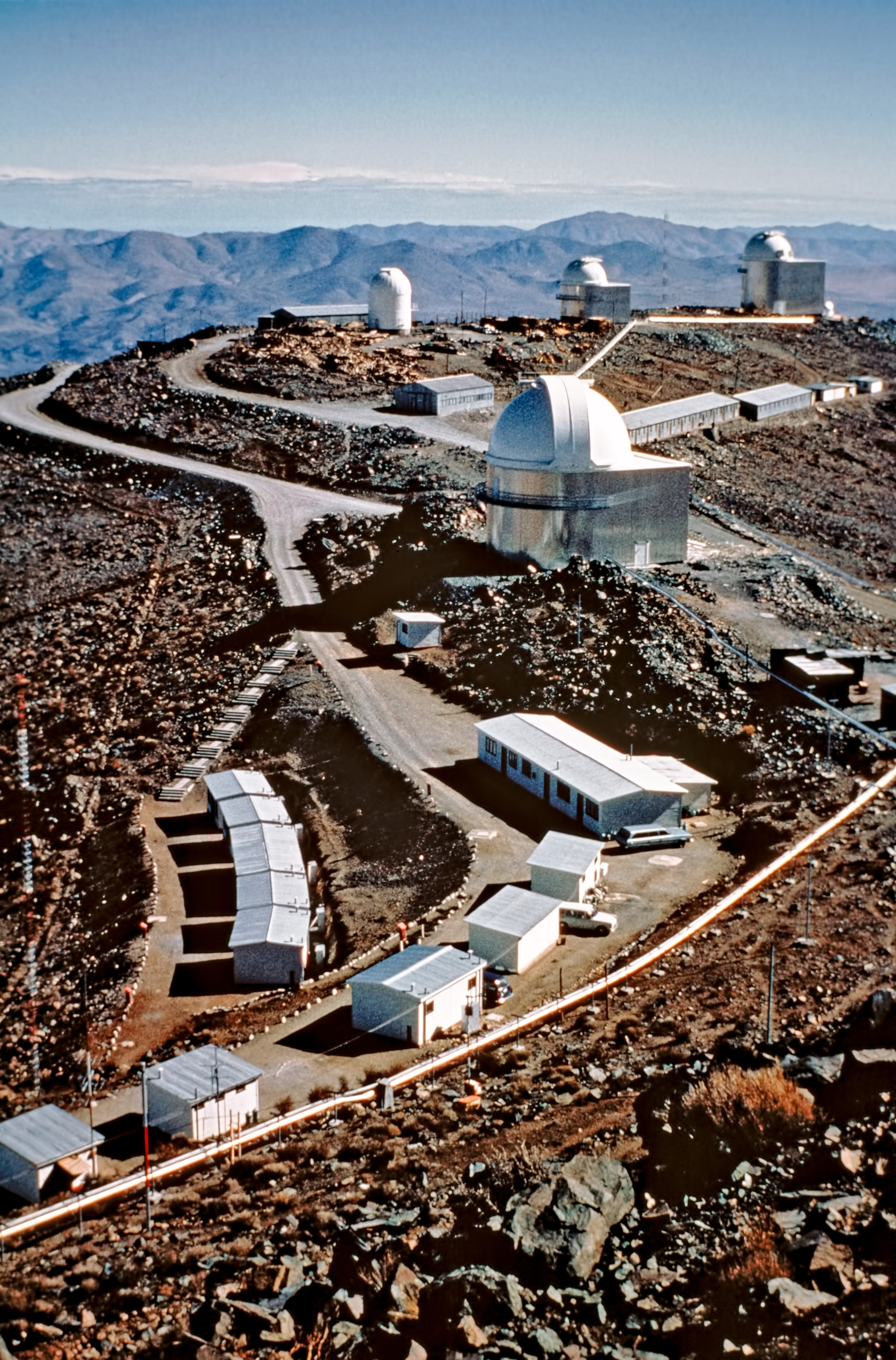
La Silla under construction in June 1968. In front is the ESO Schmidt telescope.

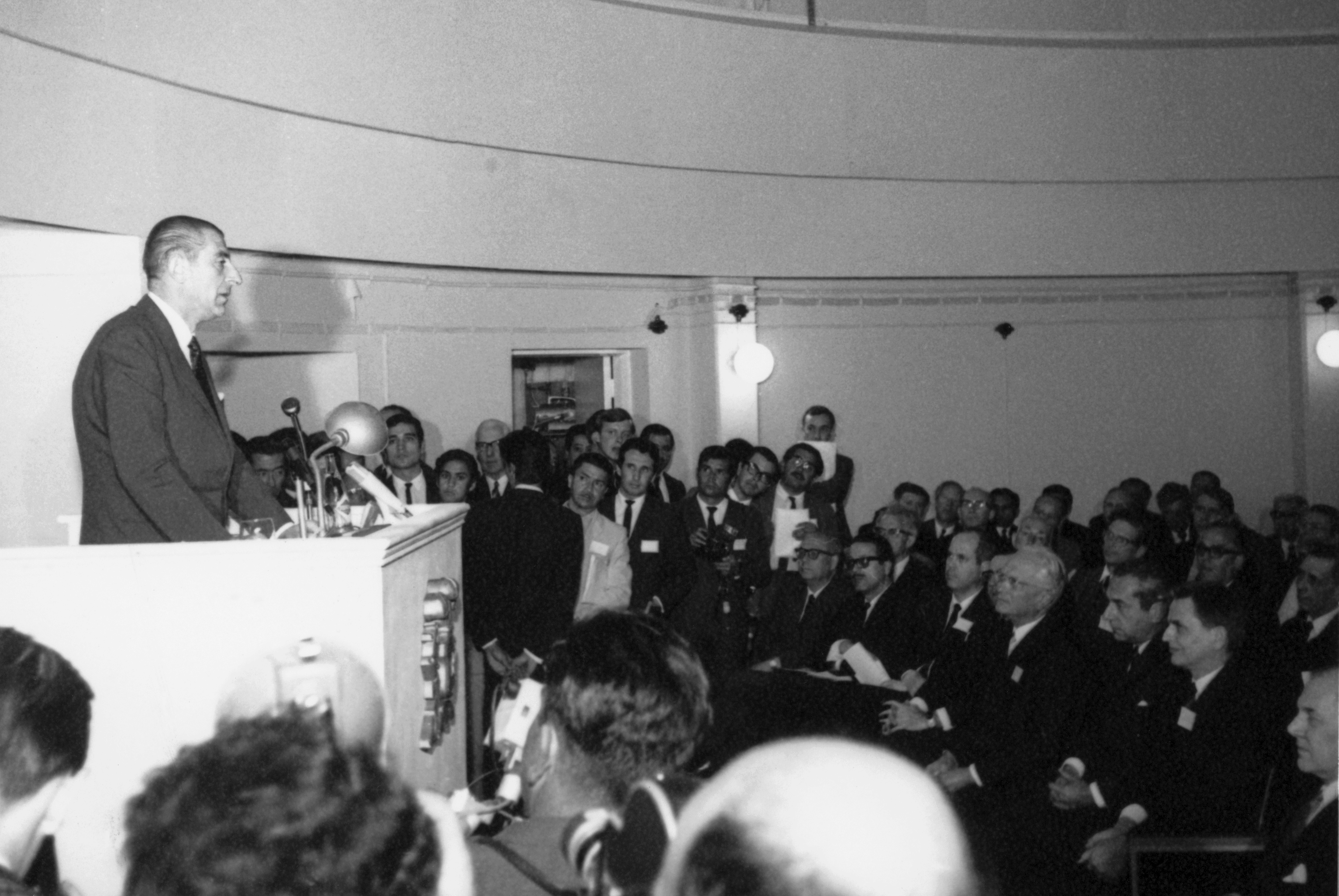
Eduardo Frei Montalva inaugurates La Silla in 1969

Following the decision in 1963 to approve Chile as the site for the ESO observatory, scouting parties were sent to various locations to assess their suitability. The site that was decided upon was La Silla in the southern part of the Atacama Desert, 600 km north of Santiago de Chile and at an altitude of 2400 metres. Besides being government property, it had the added benefits of being in a dry, flat and easily accessible area, yet isolated and remote from any artificial light and dust sources. Originally named the Cinchado, it was renamed La Silla ("the saddle" in Spanish) after its saddle-like shape. On October 30, 1964, the contracts were signed and an area of 627 square kilometres (242.1 sq mi) was purchased the following year. During 1965, temporary facilities were erected with living quarters, a workshop and storage area. The dedication ceremony of the road to the summit took place in March 1966, two months after completion of the road.

On 25 March 1969, the ESO site at La Silla was finally formally inaugurated by President Eduardo Frei Montalva. With a permanent base of dormitories, workshops, hotels and several functioning telescopes, the observatory was fully operational. The ESO 1.5-metre and ESO 1-metre telescopes had been erected in the late 1960s, and were joined in 1968 by the Gran Prismo Objectif telescope, which had previously been used in South Africa. These three telescopes can be seen in this order from right to left in the background of the image on the left from June 1968.

By 1976, the largest telescope planned, the § ESO 3.6 m Telescope, started operations. It was subsequently to have a 1.4m CAT (Coudé Auxiliary Telescope) attached. In 1984, the 2.2m telescope began operations, while in March 1989, the 3.5 m New Technology Telescope (NTT) saw first light. The program reached its apex with the installation of the SEST in 1987 (Swedish ESO Submillimetre Telescope), the only large submillimetre telescope in the southern hemisphere, which was a combined project between ESO and the Swedish Natural Science Research Council. Around the end of the century some of the original telescopes were closed: the 1m Schmidt closed in 1998 and the 1.5m in 2002, while new equipment owned by various foreign observatories was introduced. A 1-metre telescope owned by Marseille Observatory opened in 1998, followed by a 1.2-metre telescope from Geneva Observatory in 2000.

== Telescopes ==
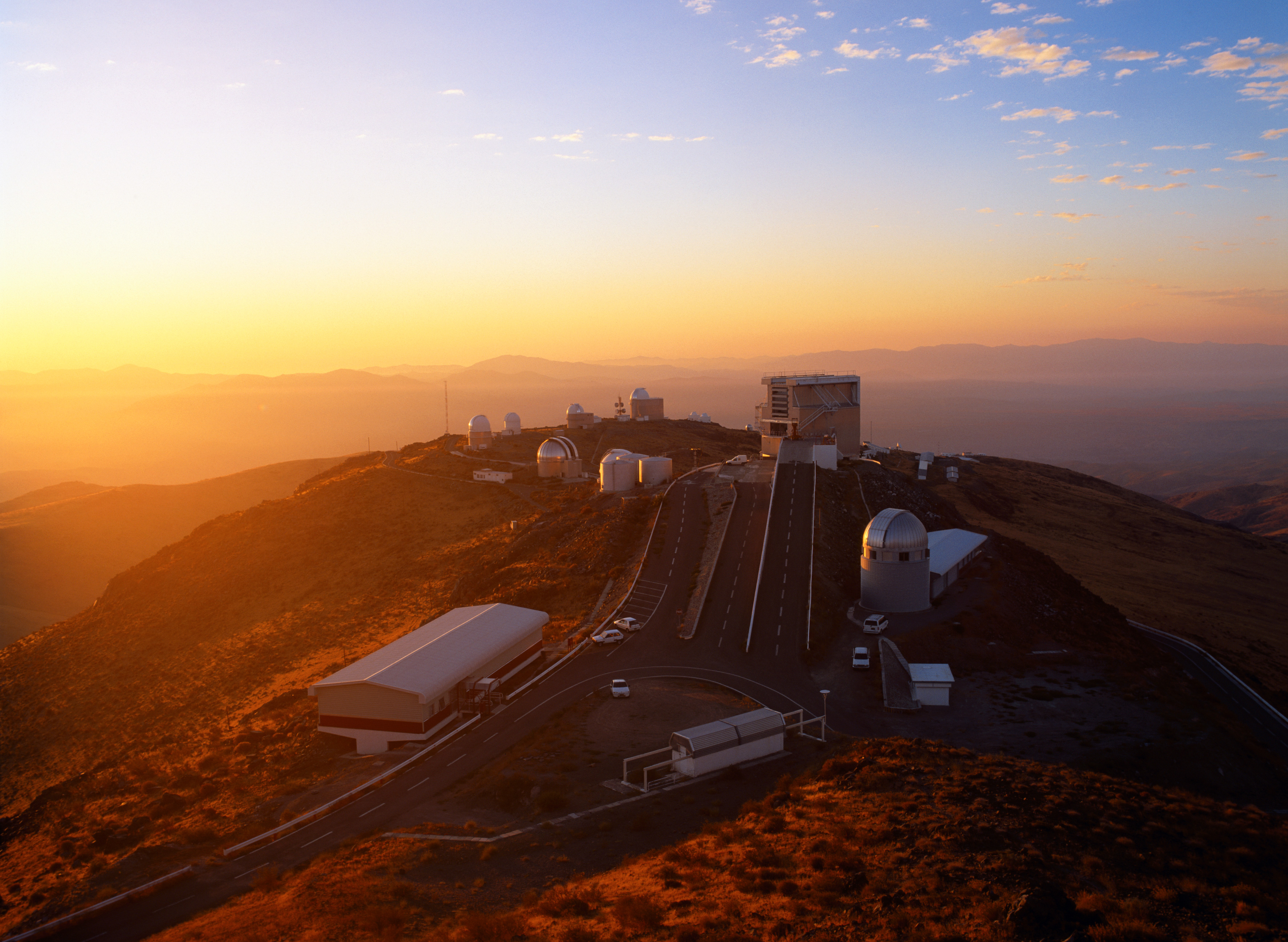
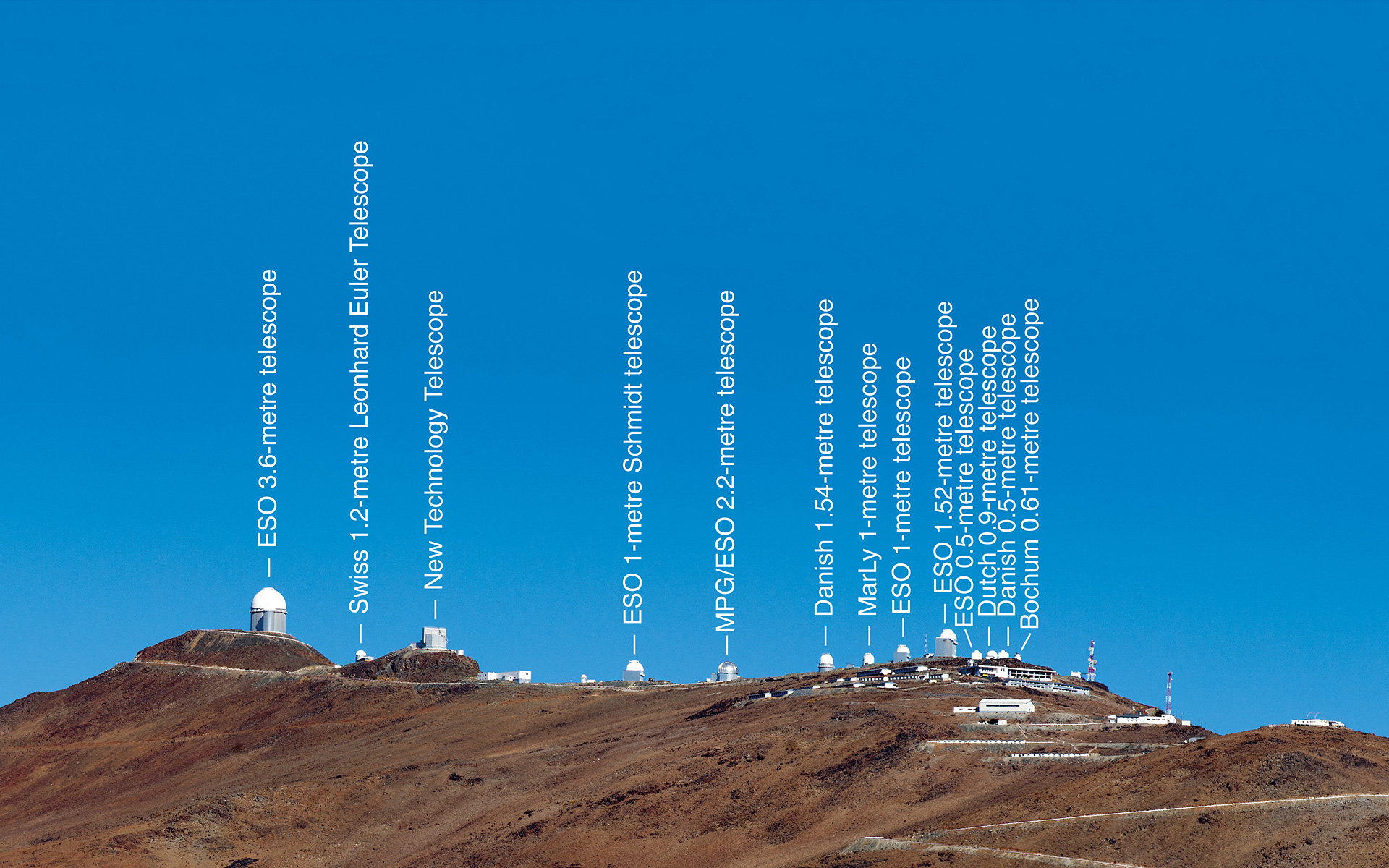
La Silla Observatory in 2003 (left) and with annotated telescope names

ESO operates three major optical and near infrared telescopes at the La Silla site: the New Technology Telescope (NTT), the 3.6-m ESO Telescope, and the 2.2-m Max-Planck-ESO Telescope (MPG/ESO Telescope). In addition La Silla hosts several other national and project telescopes such as the ESO 1-metre Schmidt Telescope, the 1.54-m Danish Telescope, the 1.2-m Leonhard Euler Telescope, the Rapid Eye Mount telescope, TRAPPIST and TAROT. These telescopes are not operated by ESO and hence do not fall under the responsibility of La Silla Science Operations.

=== ESO 3.6 m Telescope ===
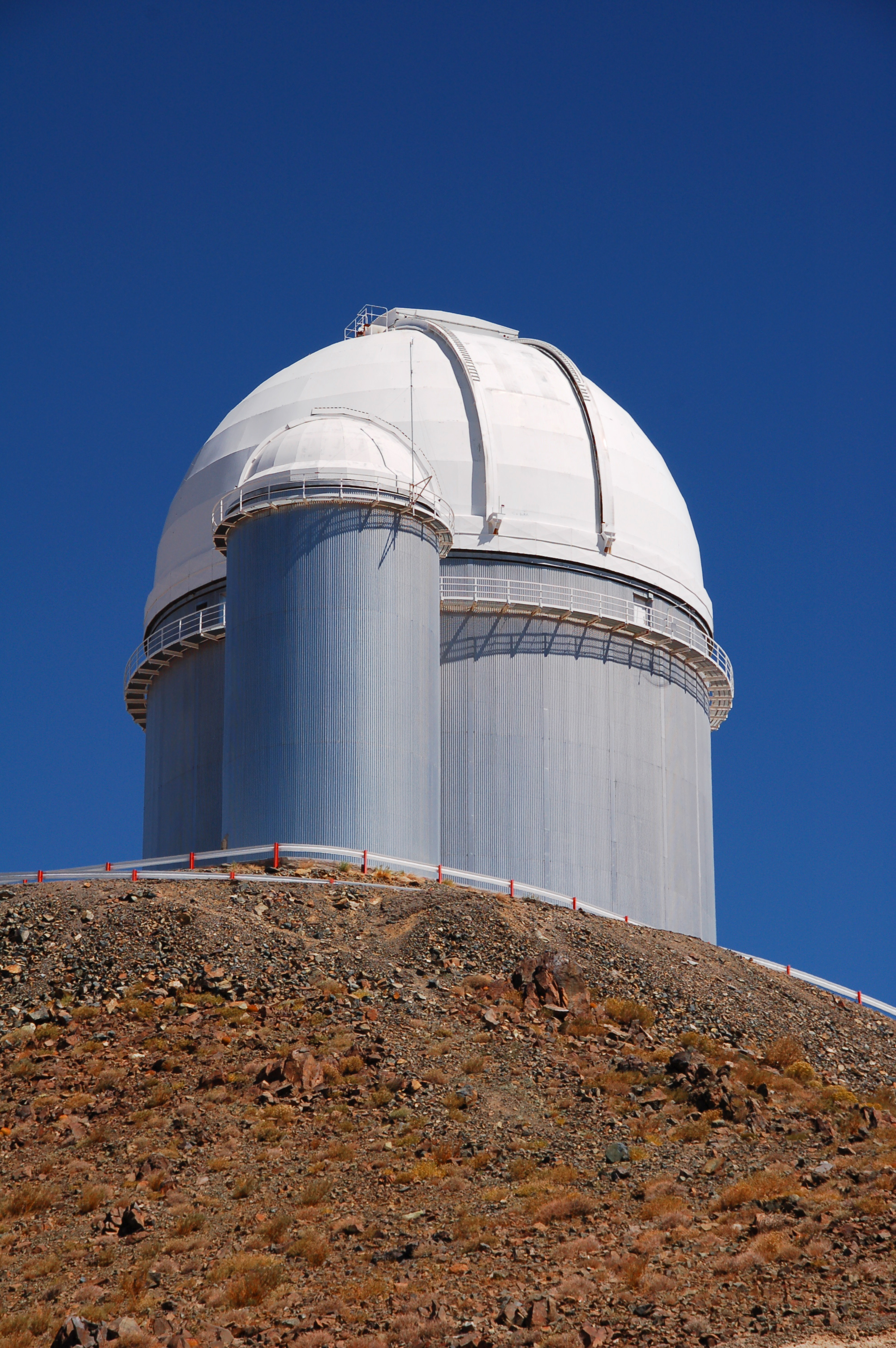
ESO 3.6 m Telescope

This 3.6 m Cassegrain telescope started operations in 1976 and has been frequently upgraded since, including the installation of a new secondary mirror that has kept the telescope efficient and productive for astronomical research. The telescope hosts HARPS, the High Accuracy Radial velocity Planet Searcher. HARPS is a spectrograph with high precision and is the most successful finder of low-mass exoplanets to date. Since 2022, the 3.6 m telescope has also hosted NIRPS, the Near Infra Red Planet Searcher.

=== New Technology Telescope ===
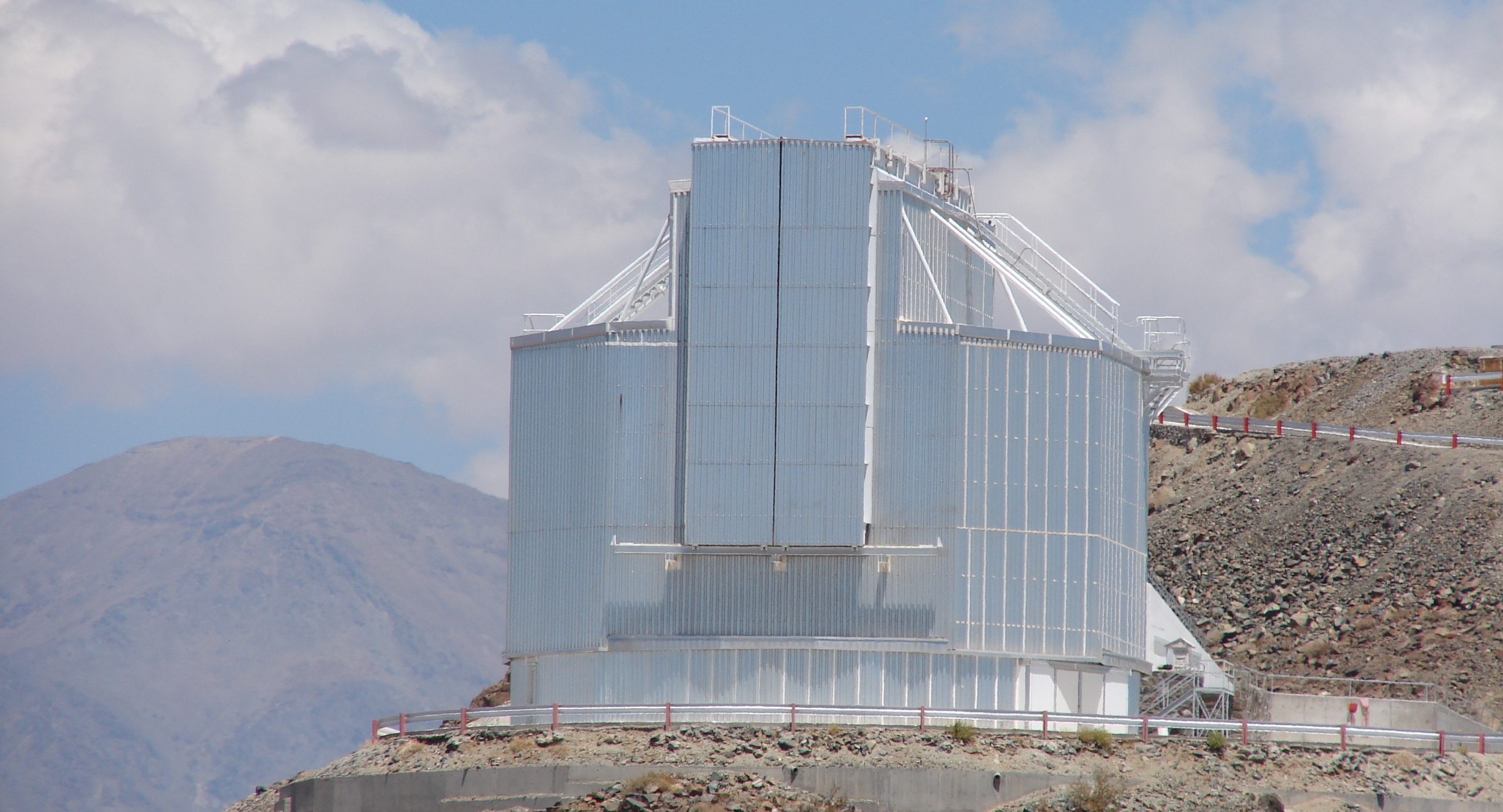
The NTT telescope

The ESO New Technology Telescope (NTT) is an Alt-Az, 3.58-metre Richey-Chretien telescope which pioneered the use of active optics. The telescope and its enclosure had a revolutionary design for optimal image quality. NTT saw first light in March 1989. The telescope chamber is ventilated by a system of flaps which optimize the air flow across the NTT optimizing the dome and mirror seeing. To prevent heat input to the building, all motors in the telescope are water cooled and all the electronics boxes are insulated and cooled. The primary mirror of the NTT is actively controlled to preserve its figure at all telescope positions. The secondary mirror position is also actively controlled in three directions. The optimized airflow, the thermal controls, and the active optics give the excellent image quality of the NTT. The NTT has active instead of adaptive optics: it corrects the defects and deformation of the telescope and mirror, but does not correct the turbulence; It ensures that the optics is always in perfect shape. Together with the thermal control, it allows the NTT to reach the ambient seeing, but it does not improve it.

=== MPG/ESO 2.2 m Telescope ===
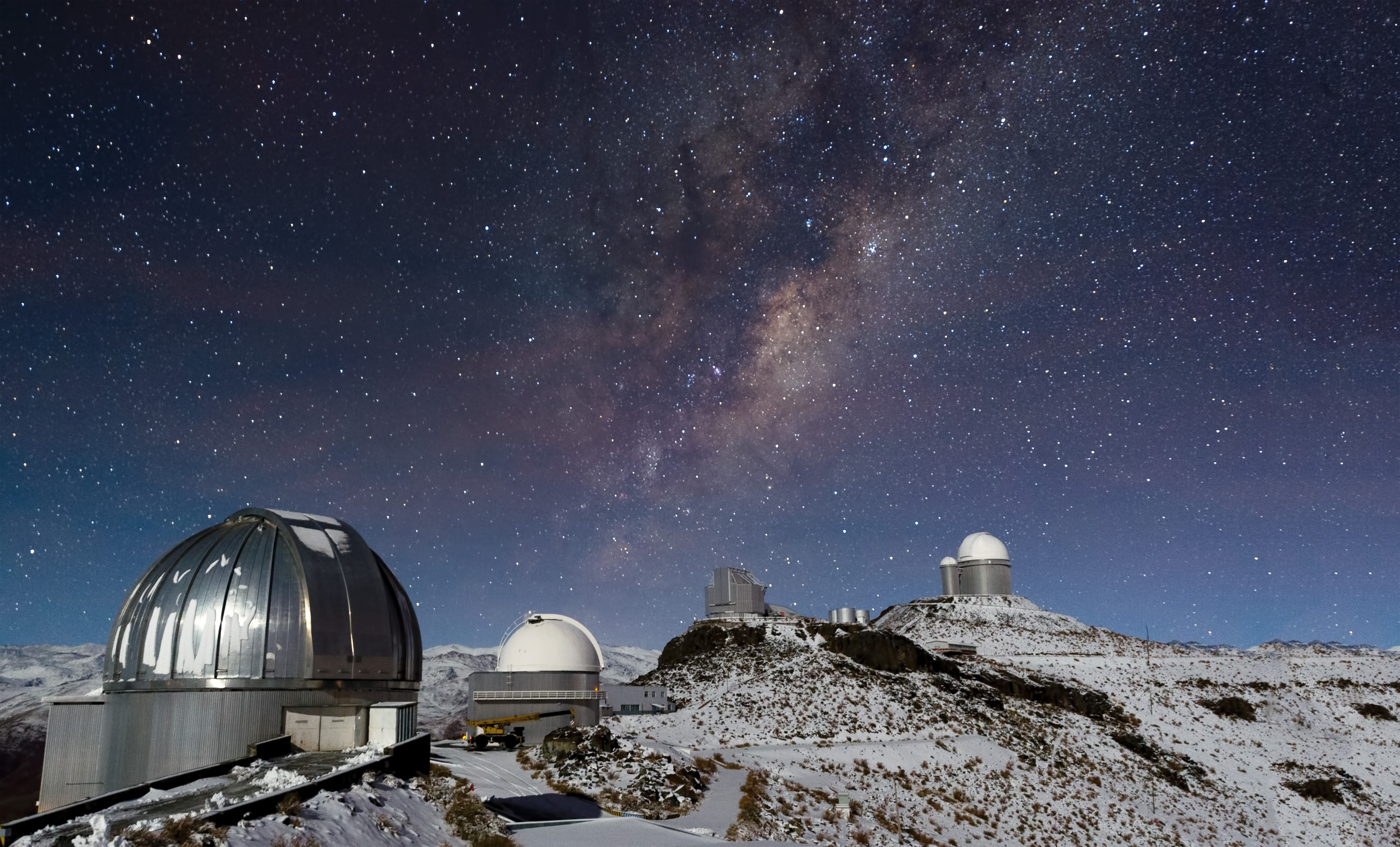
The MPG/ESO, ESO Schmidt, NTT, and ESO 3.6 telescopes (left to right)

The 2.2-metre telescope has been in operation at La Silla since early 1984, and is on indefinite loan to ESO from the Max Planck Society (German: Max Planck Gesellschaft or MPG). Telescope time is shared between MPG and ESO observing programmes, while the operation and maintenance of the telescope are ESO's responsibility. However, due to a new agreement between the Max Planck Institute for Astronomy (MPIA) and ESO, the instrument is operated by MPG until the end of September 2016. The telescope hosts three instruments: the 67-million pixel Wide Field Imager, which has a field of view as large as the full Moon; GROND, the Gamma-Ray Burst Optical/Near-Infrared Detector, which chases the afterglows of the most powerful explosions in the Universe, known as gamma-ray bursts; and the high-resolution spectrograph, FEROS, used to make detailed studies of stars. MPG's 2.2-metre telescope in La Silla also has a twin located at the Calar Alto Observatory in southern Spain.

=== Other telescopes ===
La Silla also hosts several national and project telescopes not operated by ESO. Among them are the Swiss Euler Telescope, the Danish National Telescope and the REM, TRAPPIST and TAROT telescopes.

==== ESO Schmidt telescope ====
The ESO 1-metre Schmidt telescope, is a Schmidt telescope designed to provide a wide field of view of the sky—equivalent to about the area of 64 full Moons. Commissioned in 1971, it was one of the first telescopes operational at La Silla and was still using photographic plates at the time. These plates later confirmed the rediscovery of long-lost asteroids such as 1179 Mally and 843 Nicolaia.

In 2009, the telescope was dedicated to the LaSilla–Quest Variability Survey, by Yale's Department of Astronomy, and has since been used for astronomical surveys focused on the discovery of new Kuiper Belt Objects (KBOs), periodic variable stars, and supernovas.

Yales's 160-megapixel QUEST camera consists of a mosaic of 112 CCDs and covers about sixteen square degrees. This enables the remotely controlled project telescope to observe about a third of the night sky every four days. The La Silla–QUEST survey with the Schmidt telescope corresponds to the Palomar Distant Solar System Survey that was carried out in the Northern Hemisphere and led to the discovery of several trans-Neptunian objects and centaurs. In 1996, the telescope imaged 7968 Elst–Pizarro with a previously unseen cometary tail, which spawned a new class of celestial bodies called main-belt comet.

==== Euler telescope ====
The Euler Telescope is a 1.2-metre telescope built and operated by the Geneva Observatory in Switzerland. It uses the CORALIE spectrograph to conduct high-precision radial velocity measurements, also known as the wobble method, primarily in the search for large extrasolar planets in the southern celestial hemisphere. Its first discovery was a planet orbiting Gliese 86. Other observing programmes focus on variable stars, asteroseismology, gamma-ray bursts, monitoring active galactic nuclei and gravitational lenses.

==== MASCARA ====
MASCARA, the Multi-site all-sky camera station saw first light in July 2017. Built and operated by the Dutch Leiden University, the instrument is dedicated to search for exoplanets. MASCARA has a sibling station for the Northern hemisphere at the Roque de los Muchachos Observatory in Spain.

==== REM telescope ====
The Rapid Eye Mount telescope (REM) is a small rapid-reaction automatic telescope with a primary 60-centimetre (24 in) mirror. The telescope, in an altazimuth mount, began operation in October 2002. The primary purpose of the telescope is to follow the afterglow of the GRBs detected by the Swift Gamma-Ray Burst Mission satellite.

==== TAROT ====
The Quick-action telescope for transient objects, TAROT (French: Télescope à Action Rapide pour les Objets Transitoires) is a very fast-moving optical robotic telescope able to observe a gamma-ray burst from its beginning. Satellites detecting GRBs send signals to TAROT, which can provide a sub-arc second position to the astronomical community. Data from the TAROT telescope is also useful in studying the evolution of GRBs, the physics of a fireball and its surrounding material. It is operated from the Haute-Provence Observatory in France.

==== Danish 1.54m Telescope ====
The 1.54-metre Danish National Telescope was built by Grubb Parsons and has been in use at La Silla since 1979. The telescope has an off-axis mount, and the optics are a Ritchey-Chrétien design. The telescope's mount and the limited space inside the dome induce significant pointing restrictions.

==== TRAPPIST ====
The Belgian robotic TRAPPIST, the TRAnsiting Planets and PlanetesImals Small Telescope–South, is a joint venture between the University of Liège and Geneva Observatory. The 0.60-metre telescope is specialized in comets and exoplanets, and was one of the few telescopes that observed a stellar occultation of the dwarf planet Eris, revealing that it may be smaller than Pluto. It has recently gained fame following the discovery and categorisation of TRAPPIST-1, a planetary system of seven near-earth like planets orbiting an ultra-cool dwarf star.

==== E152 telescope ====
Formerly "ESO 1.52-metre telescope" and used for Coudé Spectrograph. Renovated in 2020s to host the PLATOSpec spectrograph led by the Astronomical Institute of the Czech Academy of Sciences.

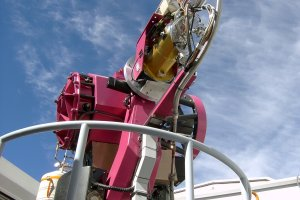
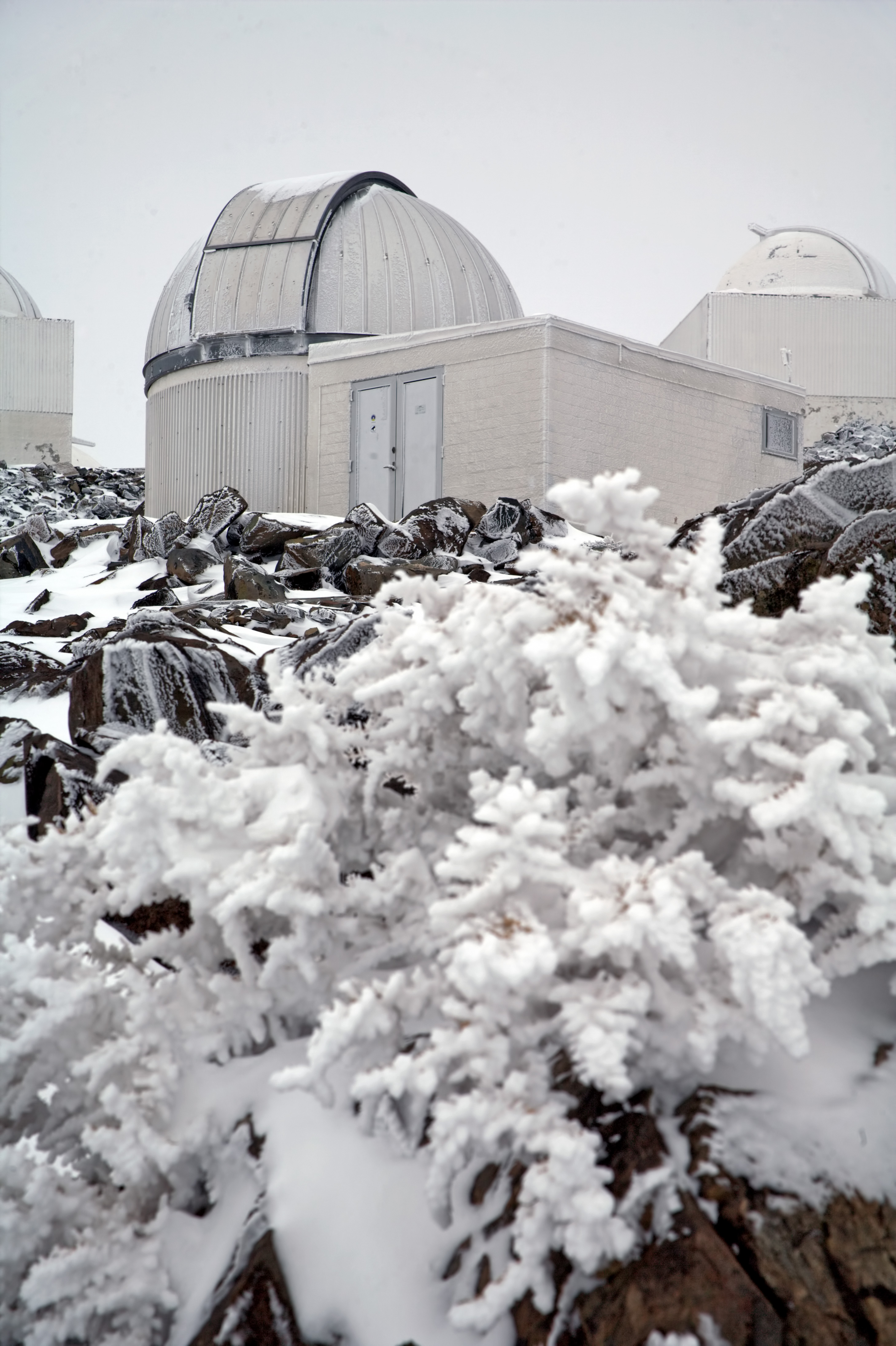
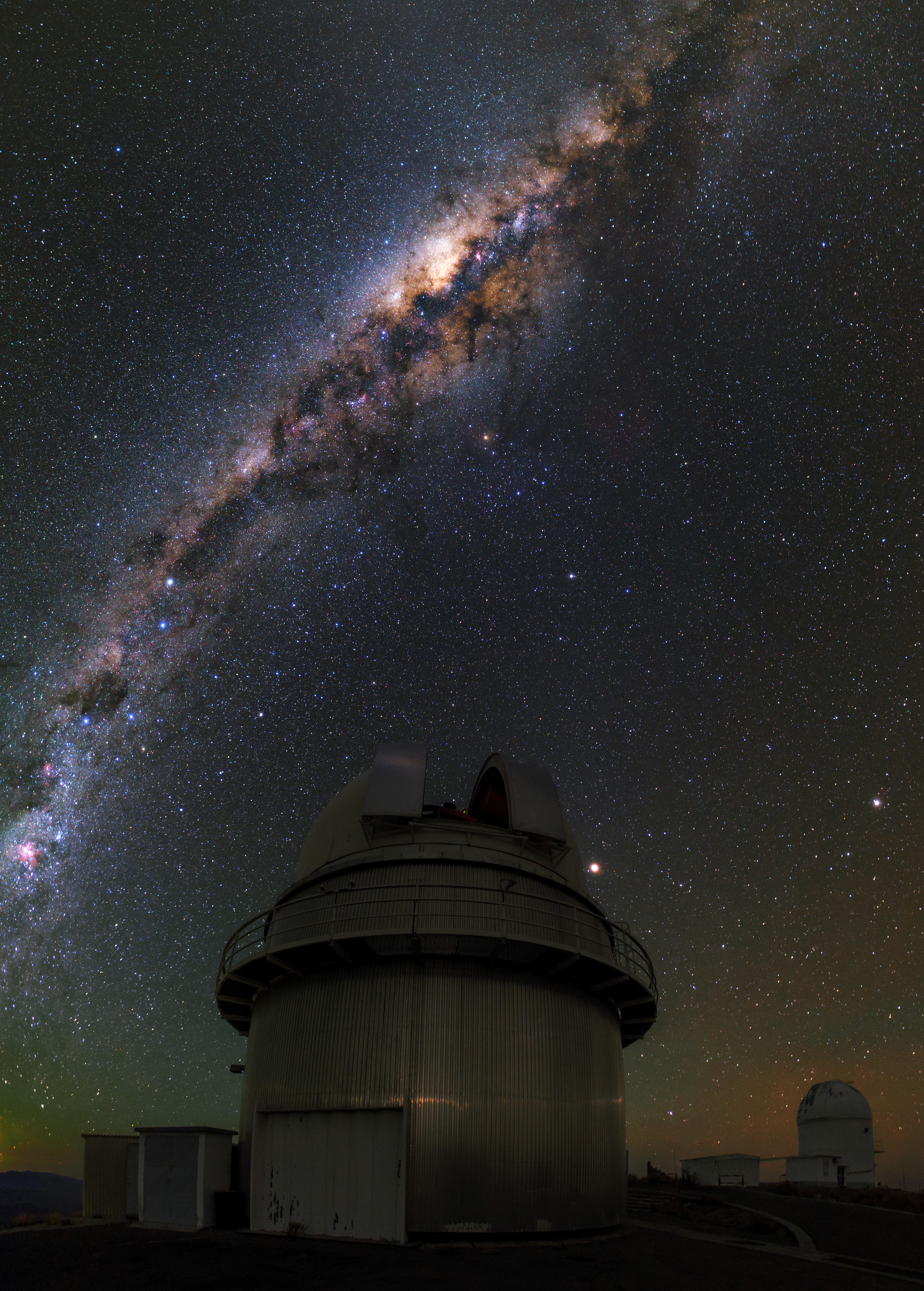
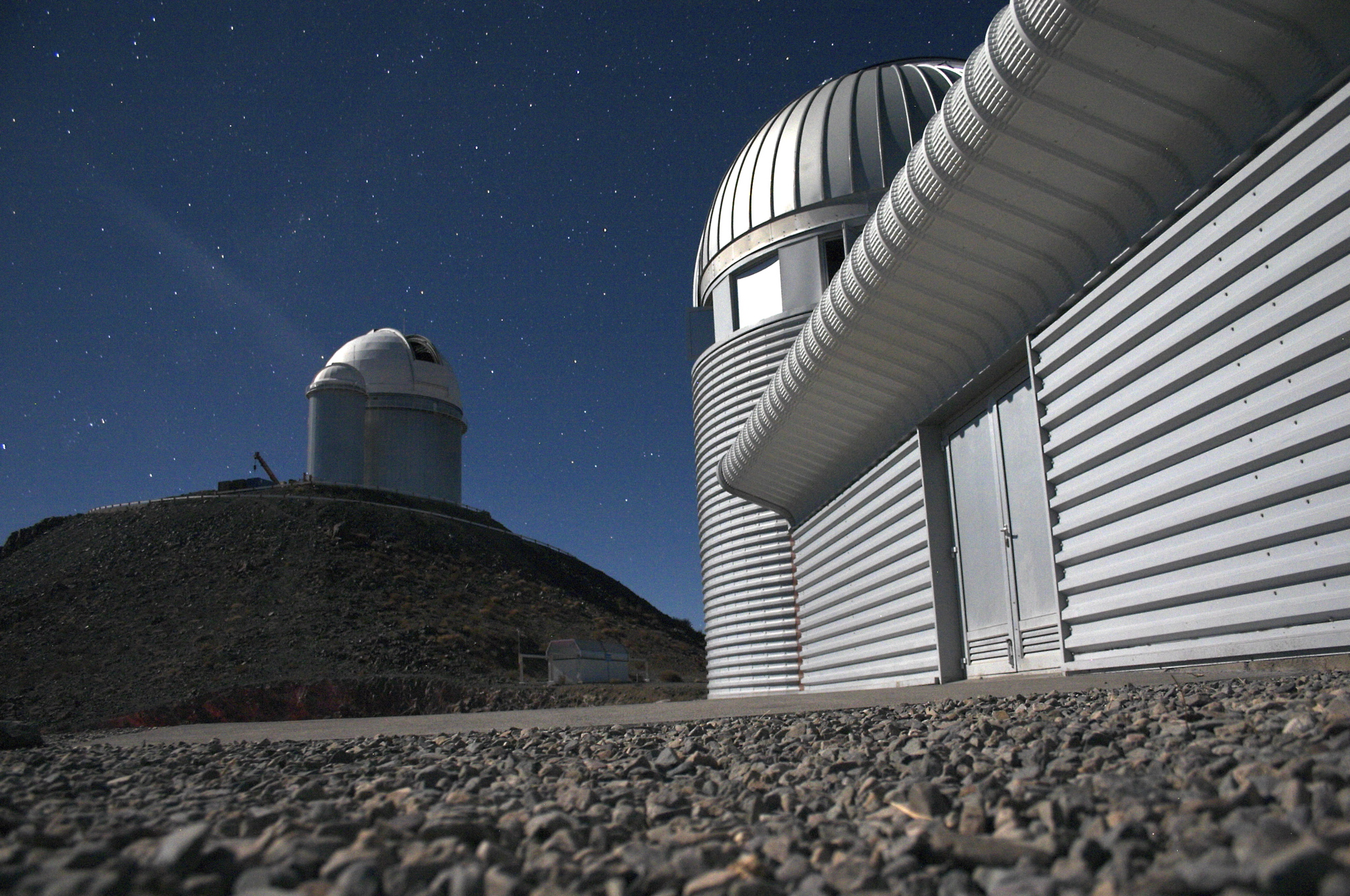
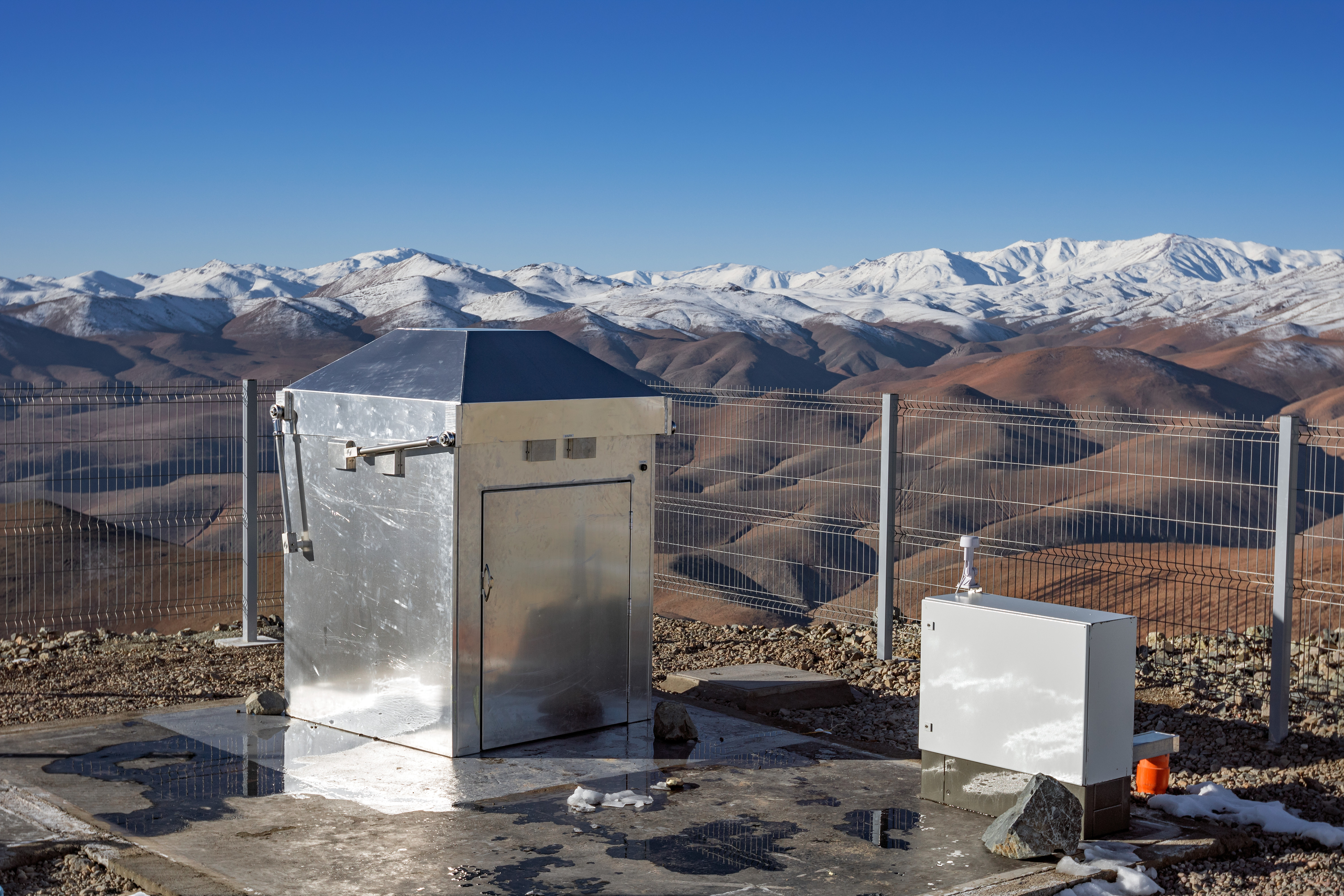
From left to right: (#1) The Rapid Eye Mount telescope and its instruments in daylight; (#2) TRAPPIST enclosure in winter time and (#3) the dome of the "Great Dane" at night; (#4) the Euler Telescope and ESO 3.6 Telescope (background); and (#5) the MASCARA station are exoplanet hunters.

=== Former telescopes ===
The following telescopes have now been decommissioned:

- Bochum 0.61-metre Telescope (National telescope)
- Coudé Auxiliary 1.47-m Telescope (CAT), adjacent to ESO 3.6 Telescope
- Danish 0.5-metre Telescope (National telescope)
- Dutch 0.9-metre Telescope (National telescope)
- Grand Prism Objectif (GPO) Telescope
- ESO 0.5-metre telescope (now at the Observatorio UC in Santiago, Chile)
- ESO 1-metre telescope (1966–1994), used for DENIS 1996–2001
- Marly 1-metre Telescope
- Marseille 0.4-metre Telescope (National telescope)
- Swedish-ESO Submillimetre Telescope (SEST), 15-metre
- Swiss T70 telescope (1980–1998, now home of TRAPPIST)
- Swiss 0.4-metre telescope (1975–1980, replaced by T70)

The Swiss T70 telescope was a 70 cm aperture telescope for photometry that had a first light in 1980. It was retired in 1998, when the Euler Telescope was commissioned. The Swiss T70 was a Cassegrain reflector design mounted on an Equatorial fork mount. It was equipped with a P7 Photometer, and replaced the Swiss 0.4-metre telescope, which was in use from November 1975 until March 1980. As with the Euler Telescope, the Swiss T70 and 0.4-metre telescopes were operated by the Geneva Observatory.

== Scientific discoveries ==
About 300 scientific papers based on observations taken at La Silla are published each year. The HARPS spectrograph has found a large number of low-mass extrasolar planets. It detected the planets within the Gliese 581 planetary system, which contains what may be the first known rocky planet in a habitable zone, outside the Solar System. Several telescopes at La Silla played a crucial role in linking gamma-ray bursts—the most energetic explosions in the Universe since the Big Bang—with the explosions of massive stars. Since 1987, the ESO La Silla Observatory has also played an important role in the study and follow-up of the nearest recent supernova, SN 1987A.

== Signs of a pre-Hispanic culture ==
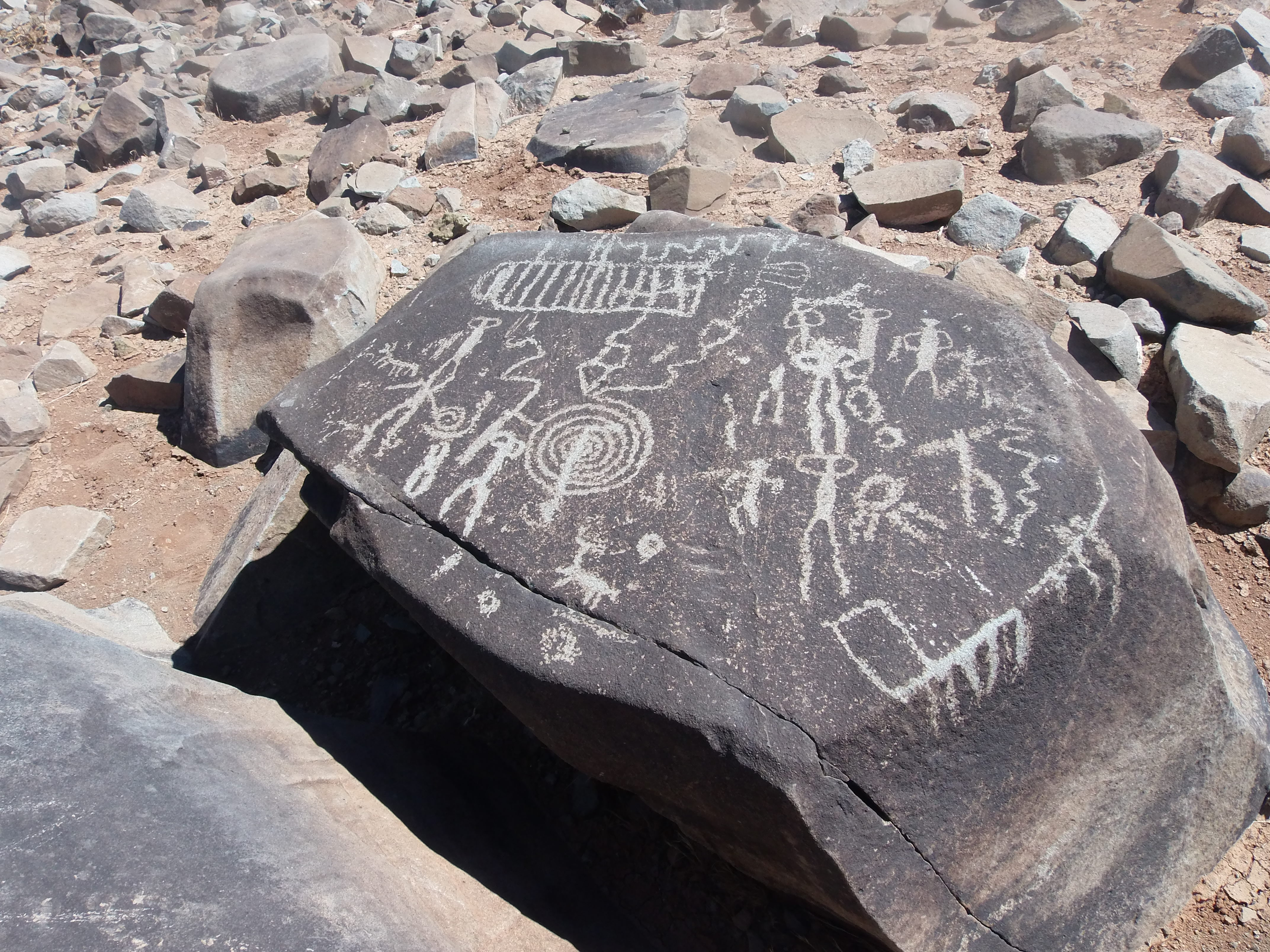
The delicate central spiral symbolizes a serpent while the rest of the space is taken up by strange little figures, together with some simple geometric motifs and quadrupeds.

Hundreds of rock engravings, also called petroglyphs, can be found all around La Silla. These are attributed to the 300 to 700 CE El Molle culture. The El Molle culture have their origin as hunter-gatherers that developed a new way of life based on horticulture and village life. They are known for their pottery and body ornaments, such as necklaces and the tembetás.

There are three types of petroglyph designs at La Silla: human and animal figures, abstract geometrical designs and purely ornamental ensembles. Beside the petroglyphs there exists also a stone circle near La Silla, which is suggested as an astronomical tool. Three rocks aligned during the El Molle culture with Alpha Carinae, Beta Carinae and Alpha Centauri or Beta Centauri. This alignment occurred during late April and during May and could signal the beginning of the cold season. Farmers could have used this tool to determine when to move their herds, mostly camelidae, into their villages. There are signs of illicit excavations at La Silla since the 1990s and in 2017 some vandalism was discovered.

Another ESO site with archaeological testimonies in its vicinity is the ALMA site.

== Timelapse videos ==
A timelapse of a unique cloudscape over La Silla at sunset

Timelapse: stars rise over La Silla and its vast number of telescopes spring into action (in ultra HD)

Timelapse at La Silla: star trails form and bend towards the horizon

This time-lapse sequence shows ESO's La Silla Observatory, looking towards the south.

This sequence shows the night sky at ESO's La Silla Observatory during a night of observing.

This time-lapse video taken at ESO's La Silla site shows the stars revolving around the south celestial pole.

Time-lapse sequence of the 2.2-metre MPG/ESO telescope at the La Silla during a night of observation

This sequence shows a night of observing at ESO's La Silla Observatory in Chile.

This sequence shows a night of observing at ESO's La Silla Observatory in Chile.

== Gallery ==
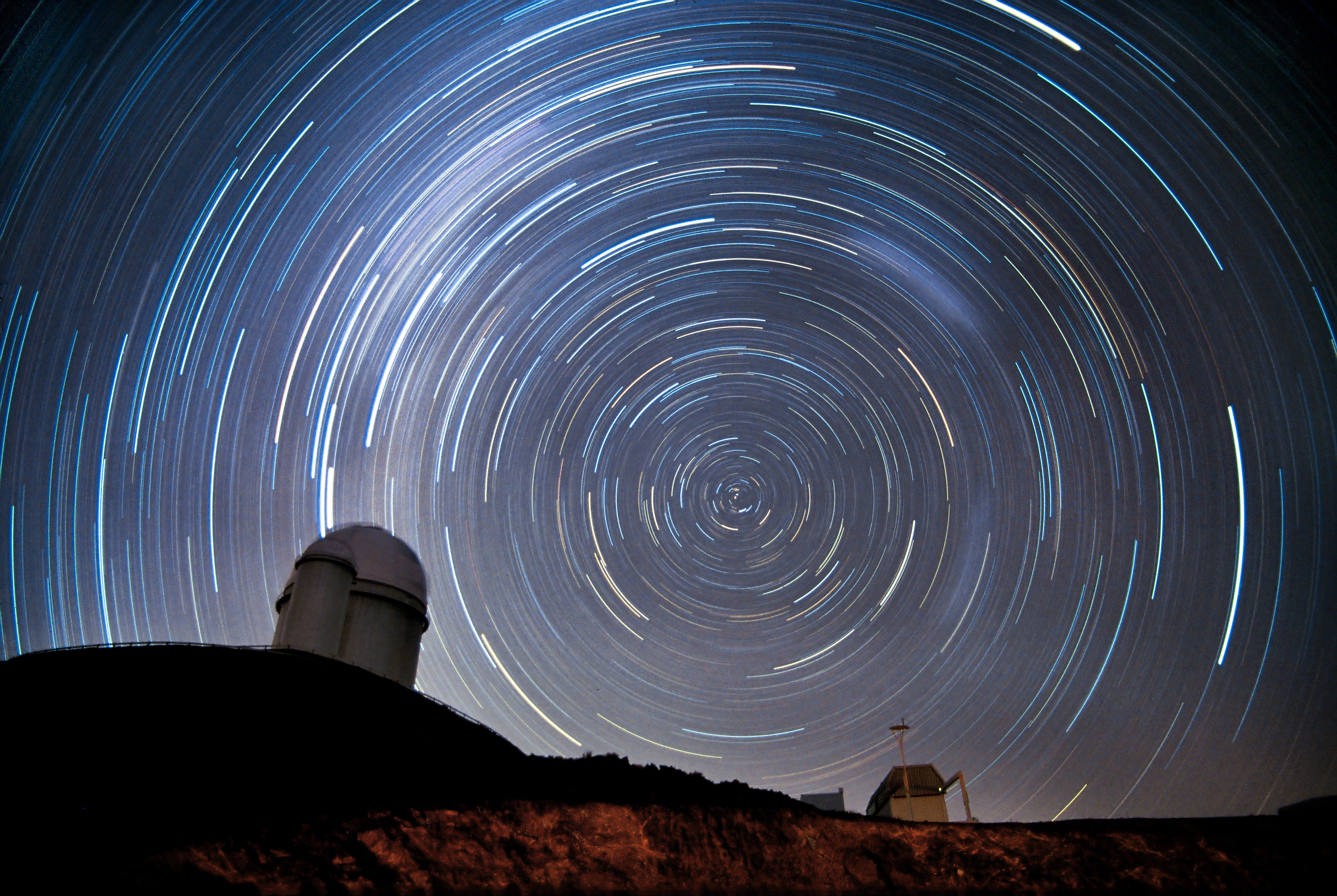
Stars rotate around the southern celestial pole during a night at La Silla

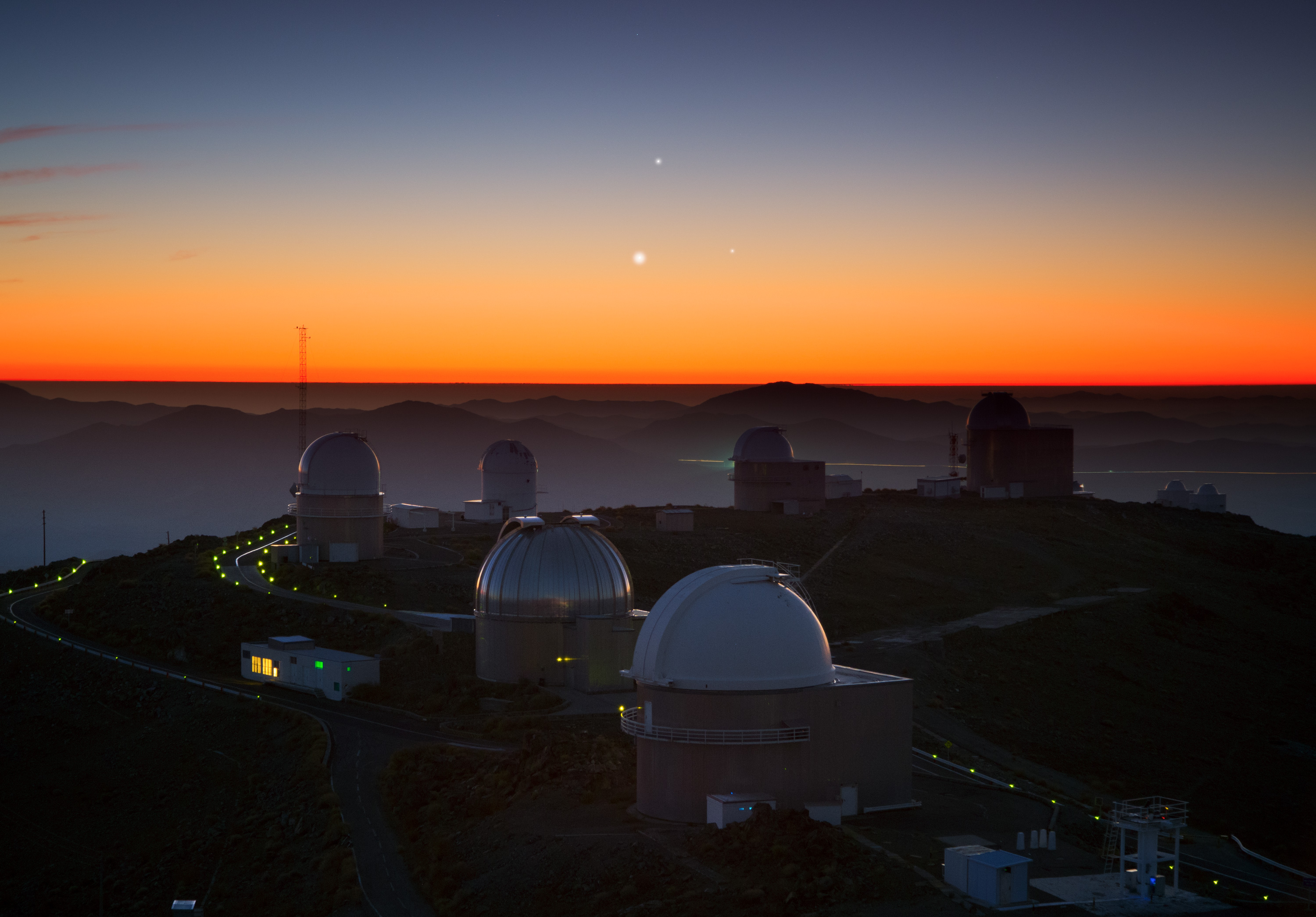
Jupiter (top), Venus (left), and Mercury (right) nearly align themselves in the sky.

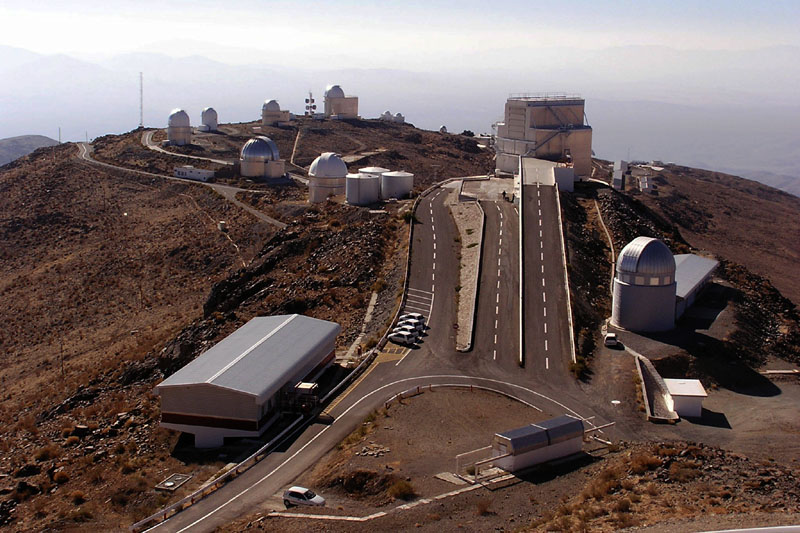
Ramps lead to the NTT. The Euler Telescope is to the right. (Seen from the ESO 3.6 Telescope.)

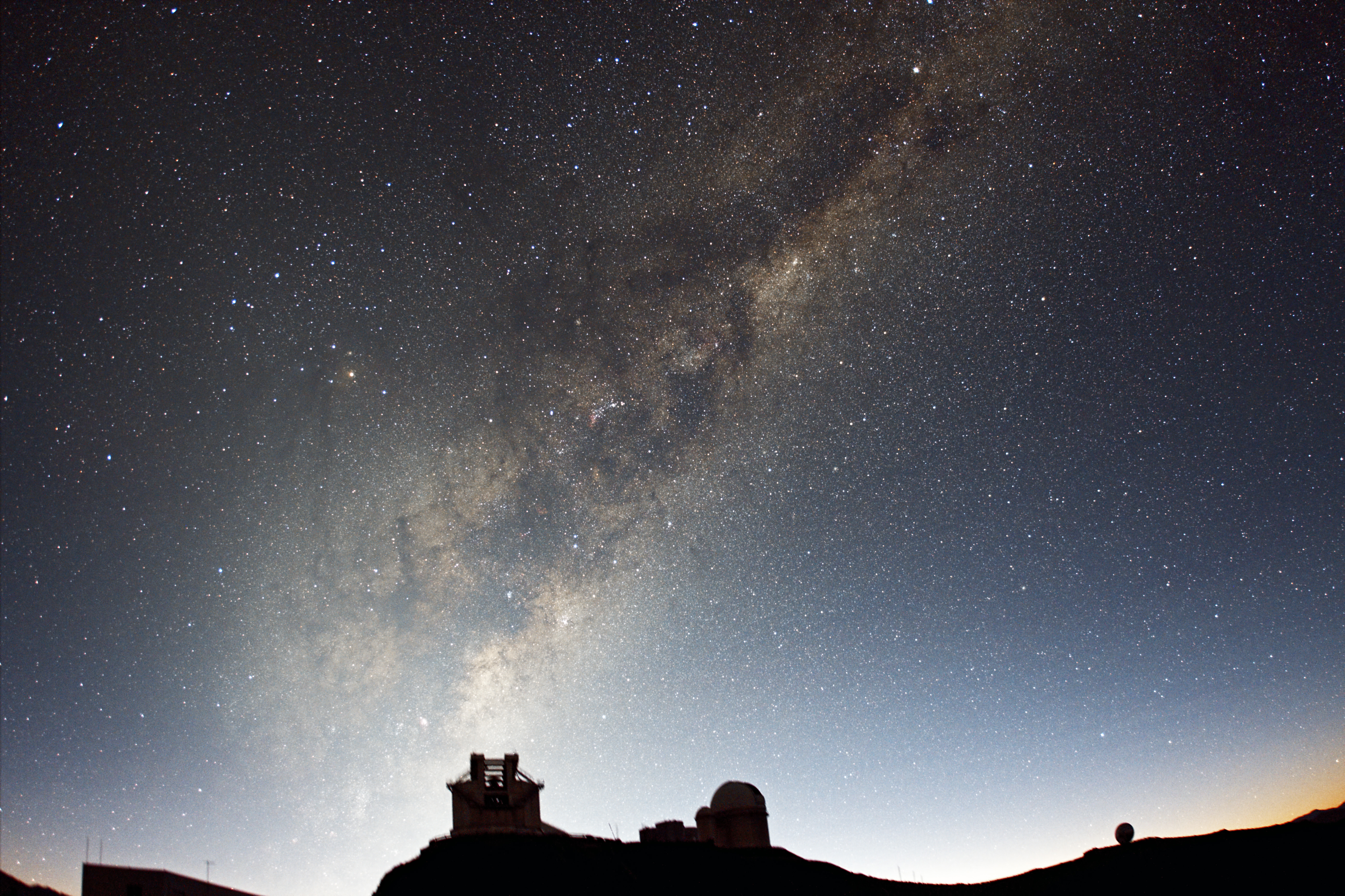
Morning Light Over La Silla.

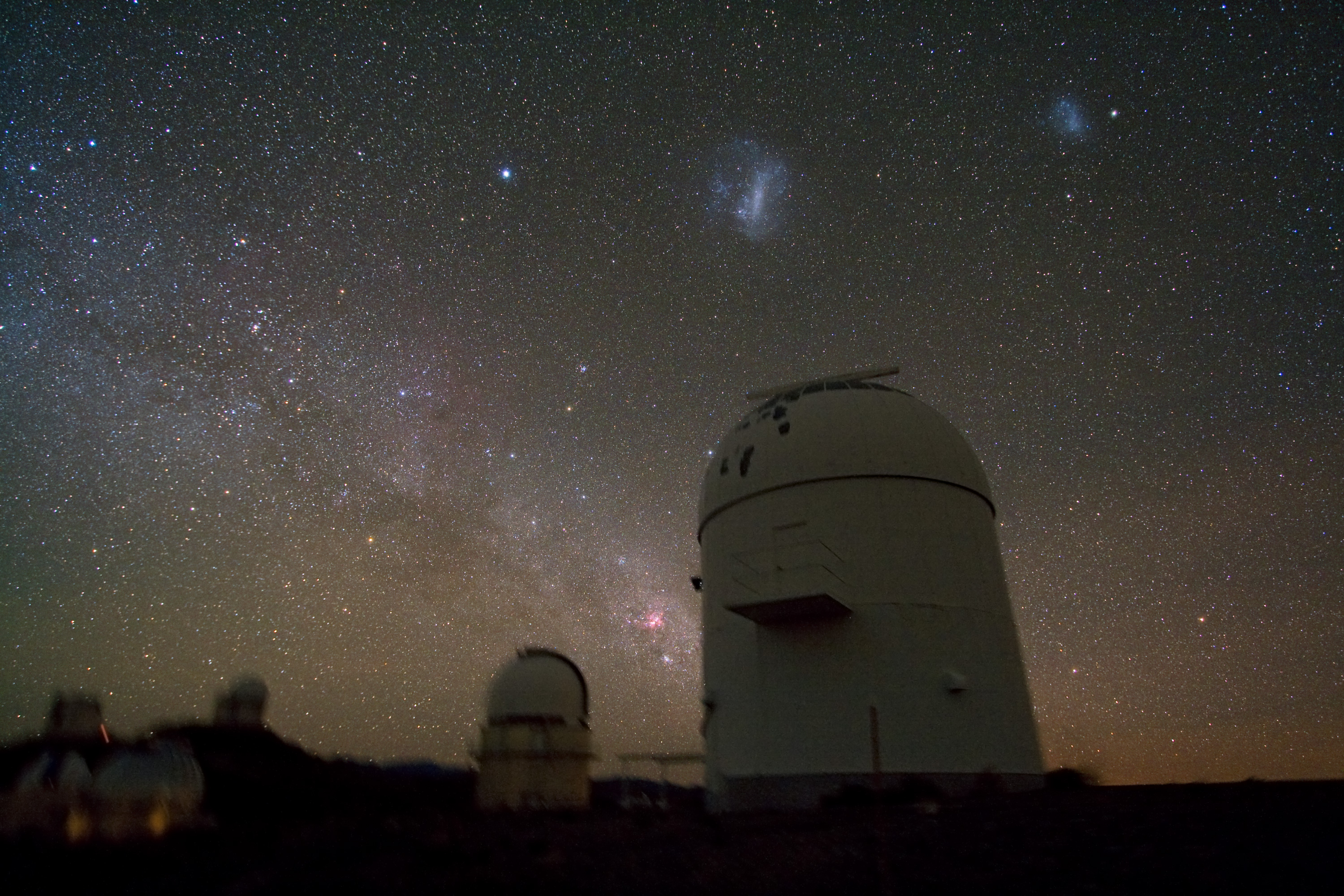
Telescope Domes clustered at La Silla

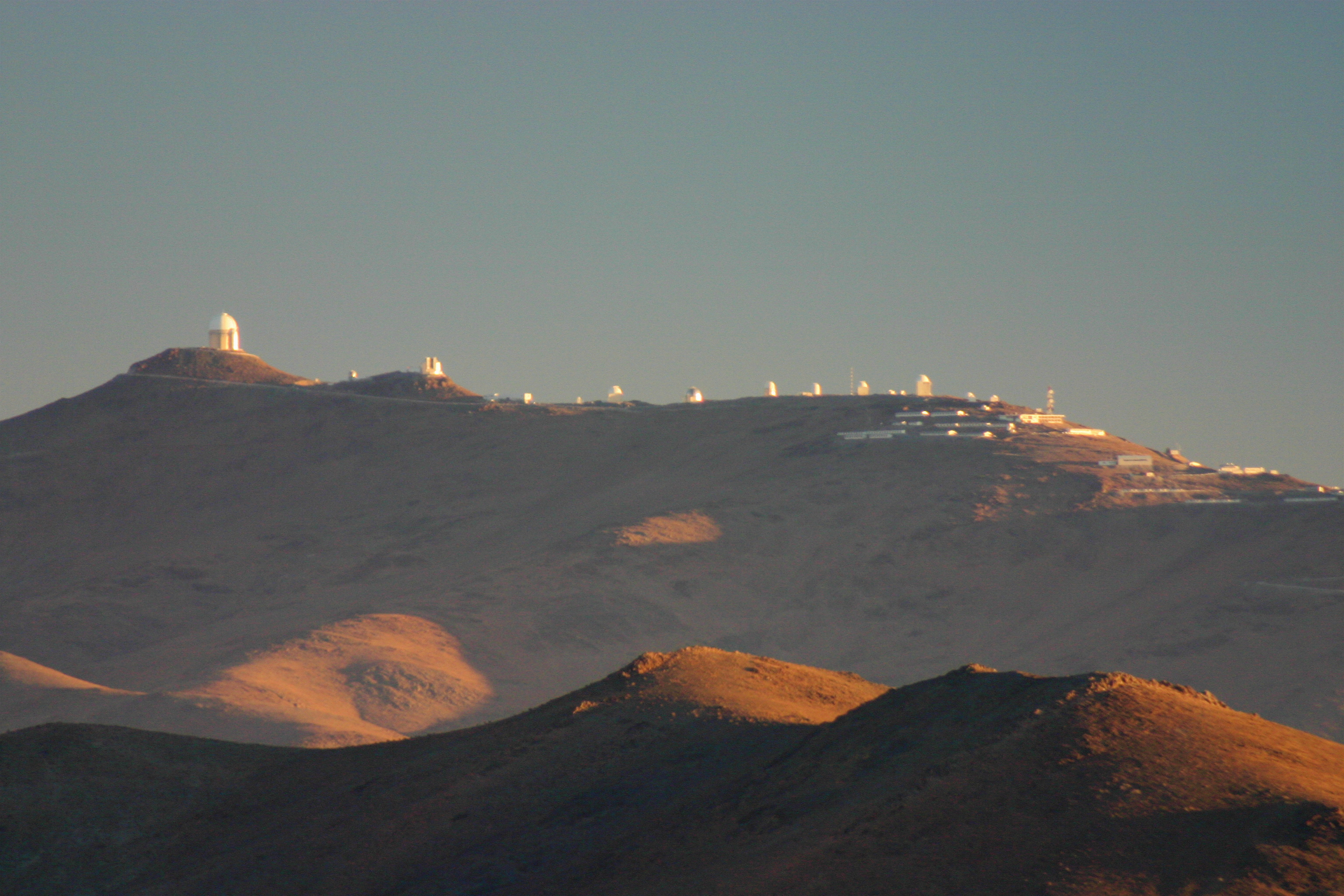
La Silla Observatory at sunset

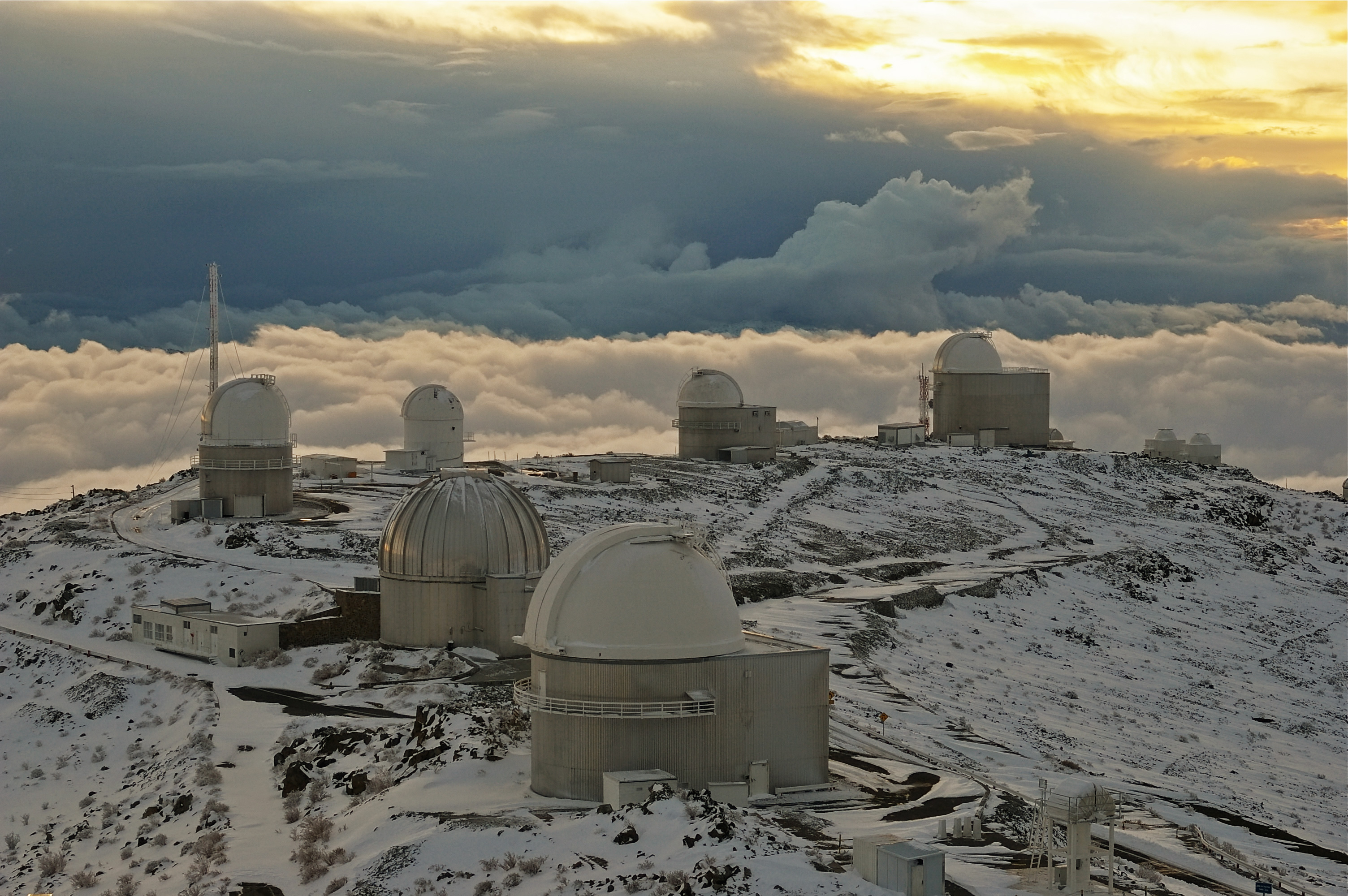
La Silla Observatory blanketed in snow as the Sun sets.

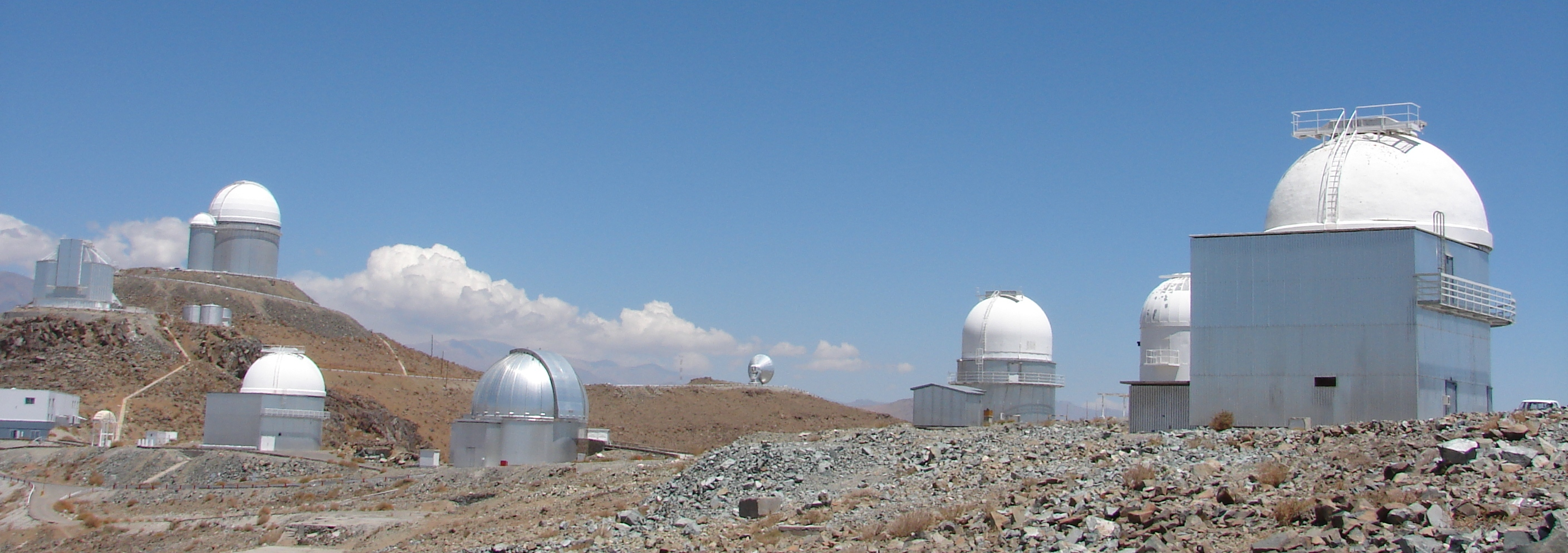
La Silla Observatory during daytime

Observatory trailer

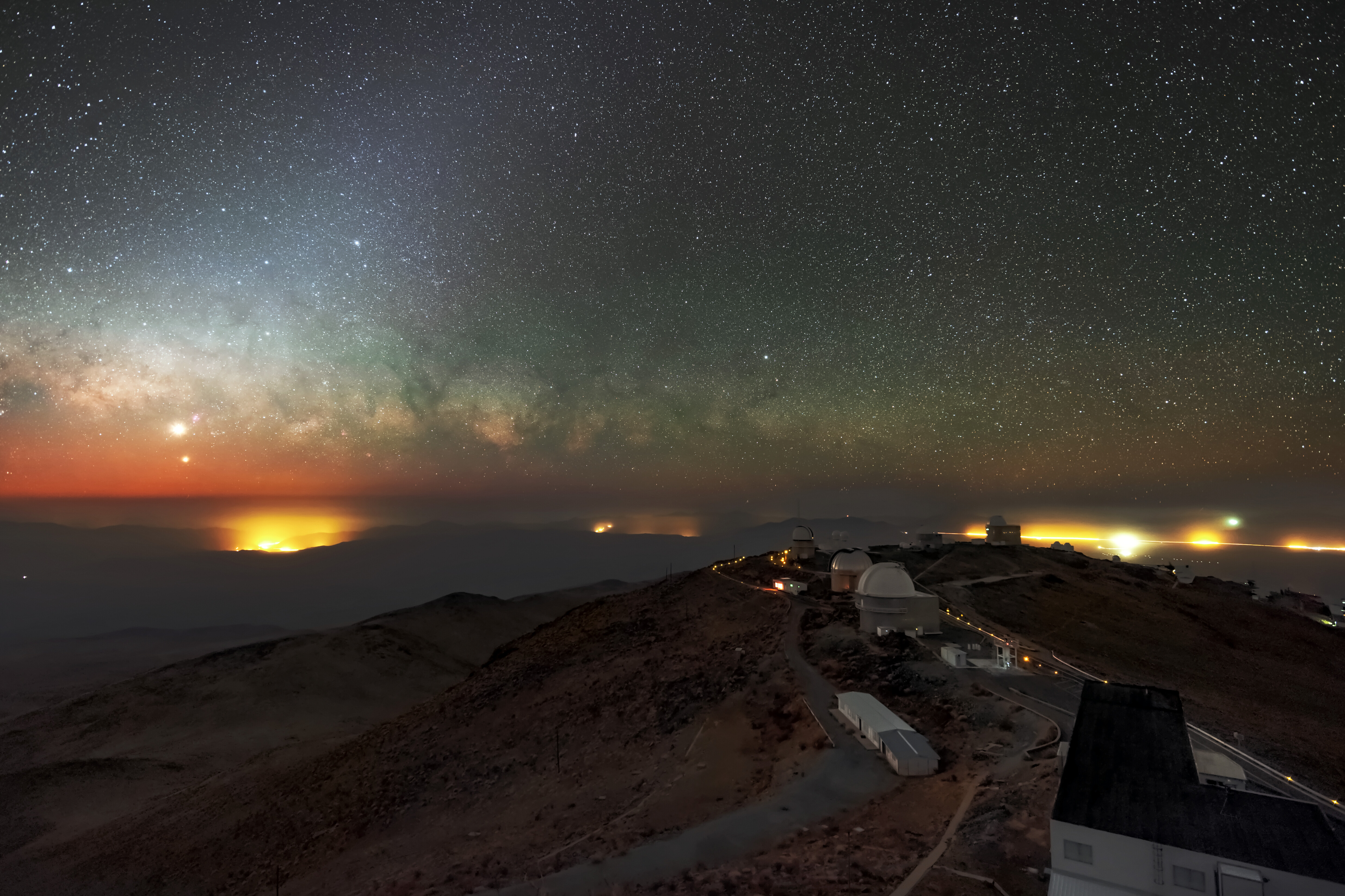
This remarkable photo shows the ESO La Silla observatory in the foreground with the planets Venus and Jupiter low in the sky and the Milky Way drifting behind them.

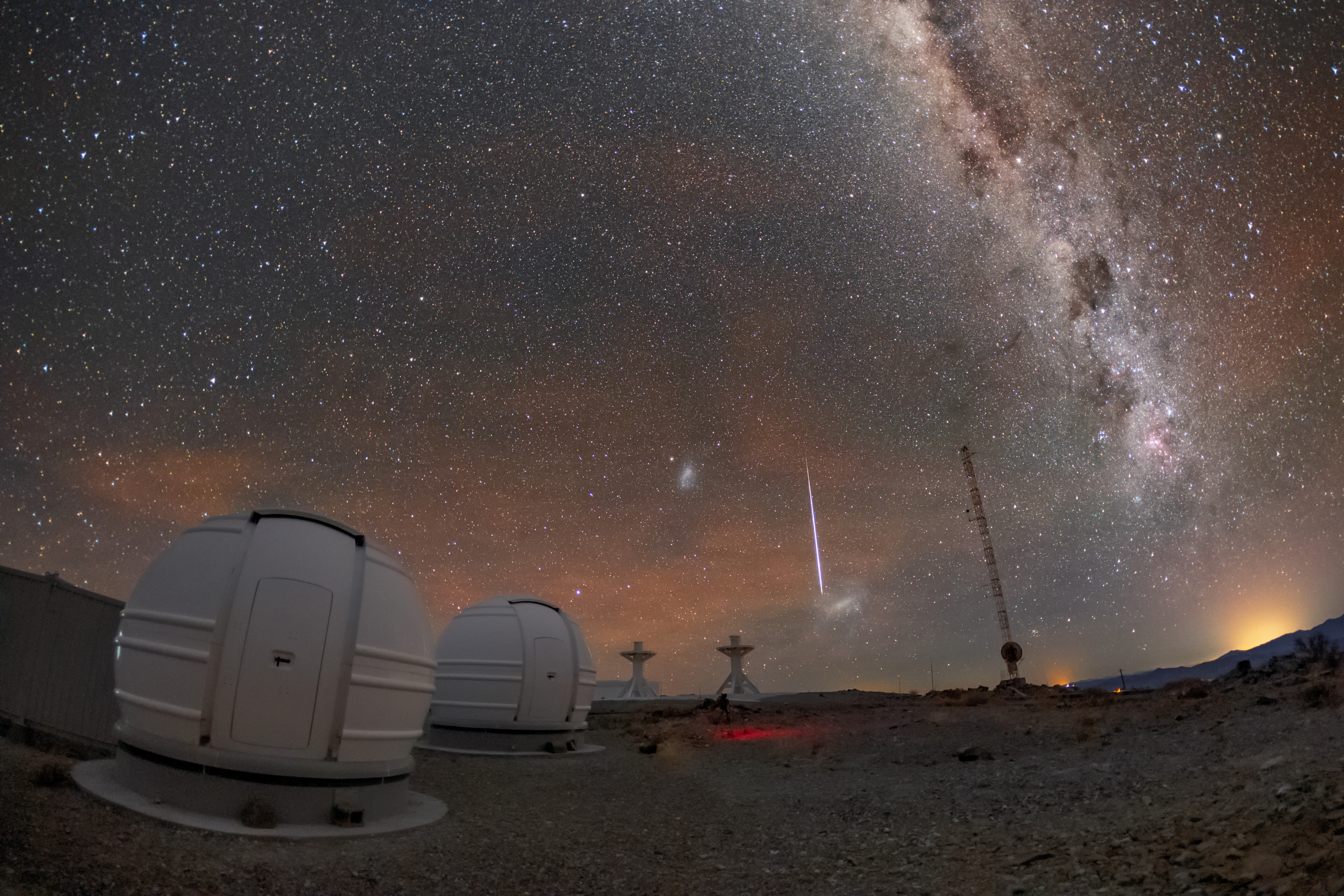
This picture shows two of the three new ExTrA telescopes hosted at ESO's La Silla Observatory in Chile. Situated over 2000 meters above sea level, these telescopes scour the skies for Earth-sized worlds around M class stars, which are stars smaller than the Sun.
Panorama of La Silla at sunset with the ESO 3.6 m Telescope in the center and the decommissioned Swedish radio telescope in the foreground

== See also ==
- List of astronomical observatories
- List of highest astronomical observatories
- Other observatories in Chile:
  - Llano de Chajnantor Observatory
    - Atacama Large Millimeter Array
  - Paranal Observatory
    - Very Large Telescope
  - Cerro Armazones Observatory
    - Extremely Large Telescope
  - Cerro Tololo Inter-American Observatory
- Cerro Tololo Inter-American Observatory
- Llano de Chajnantor Observatory
