= Remote Telescope Markup Language =

Markup language for telescopes

The Remote Telescope Markup Language (RTML) is an XML dialect for controlling remote and/or robotic telescopes. It is used to describe various telescope parameters (such as coordinates and exposure time) to facilitate observation of selected targets. RTML instructions were designed to be displayed in a more human-readable way; they are then processed and executed by telescopes through local parsers.

It was created by UC Berkeley's Hands-On Universe project in 1999. Because of its XML structure and consequent flexibility readability, it is now widely used, and has become an international standard for astronomical imaging.
