= PLATOSpec =

Astronomical instrument

PLATOspec
- E152 telescope
- Alternative names: ESO 1.52-metre telescope
- Location: La Silla Observatory
- Coordinates: 29°15′21″S 70°44′20″W
- Organization: (Czech Republic) Astronomical Institute of CAS (Germany) Karl Schwarzschild Observatory; Pontifical Catholic University of Chile
- Altitude: 2,330 m (7,640 ft)
- Wavelength: 380 to 700 nm
- First light: 2024
- Diameter: 152 cm
- Website: stel.asu.cas.cz/plato/
- Location within Chile
- Related media on Commons

PLATOSpec is an astronomical fiber fed echelle spectrograph designed to provide ground support for exoplanet-searching space telescopes, especially PLATO, but also TESS, ARIEL, and TOLIMAN. The instrument was developed by a consortium of Czech, German, and Chilean institutions and companies led by the Astronomical Institute of the Czech Academy of Sciences. It is installed at the E152 telescope at La Silla Observatory in Chile, formerly used for the Coudé Spectrograph. PLATOSpec saw its first light in 2024 and its first scientific results were published in 2025.
