= TAROT-South robotic observatory =

Robotic telescope

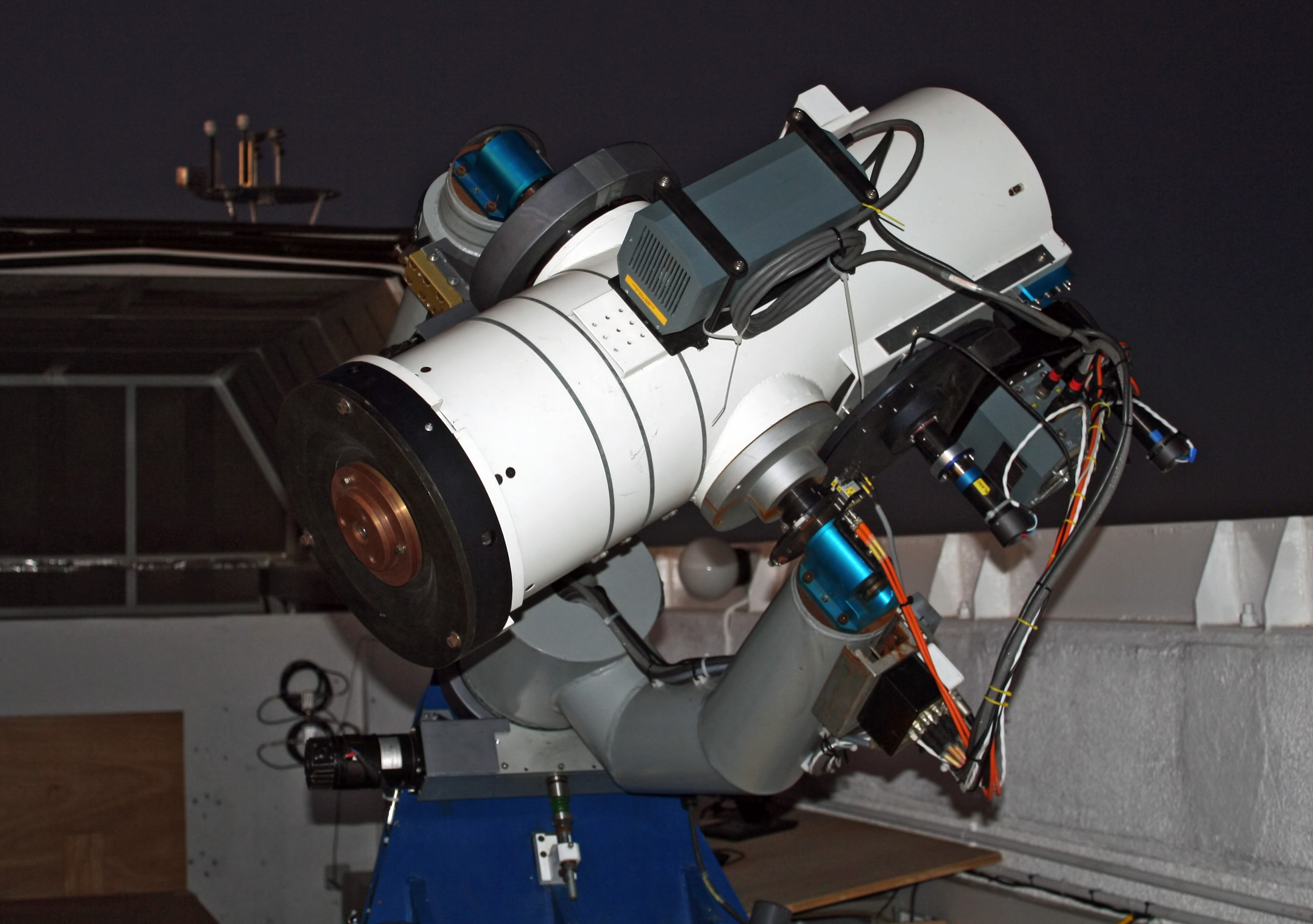
- The 25cm TAROT telescope on La Silla
- Alternative names: Télescope à Action Rapide pour les Objets Transitoires
- Part of: La Silla Observatory
- Location(s): Coquimbo Region, Chile
- Coordinates: 29°15′40″S 70°43′53″W
- Altitude: 2,375 m (7,792 ft)
- First light: 9 September 2006
- Telescope style: Newtonian telescope optical telescope robotic telescope
- Diameter: 25 cm (9.8 in)
- Secondary diameter: 14 cm (5.5 in)
- Website: www.eso.org/public/teles-instr/lasilla/tarot/
- Location of TAROT-South robotic observatory
- Related media on Commons

TAROT (French: Télescope à Action Rapide pour les Objets Transitoires, "Quick-action telescope for transient objects") is a project of the European Southern Observatory (ESO) aimed at rapidly reacting to particular data from other astronomical surveying facilities to monitor for and registering fast changing astronomical objects and phenomena. The target of the project is gamma-ray bursts (GRB).

The TAROT-South facility is a 25 cm very fast moving optical robotic telescope at the La Silla Observatory in Chile. Able to accelerate at 120°/s^{2} to a top speed of 80°/s, it can begin observing within 1–1.5 seconds of being notified by a gamma-ray telescope that a gamma-ray burst is in progress and can provide fast and accurate positions of transient events within seconds.

In addition to its own observations, an important purpose of the telescope is to find an accurate source location. With its wide field of view, it can take an approximate location (±1°) from a gamma-ray detector and produce a location accurate to 1″ within a minute, for the benefit of follow-on observations by larger telescopes with longer reaction times.

It is a duplicate of the original TAROT telescope located at the Calern observatory in France.

== See also ==
- Rapid Eye Mount telescope, a larger, somewhat slower companion telescope also located at La Silla.
