= Swedish-ESO Submillimetre Telescope =

Radio telescope located in South America

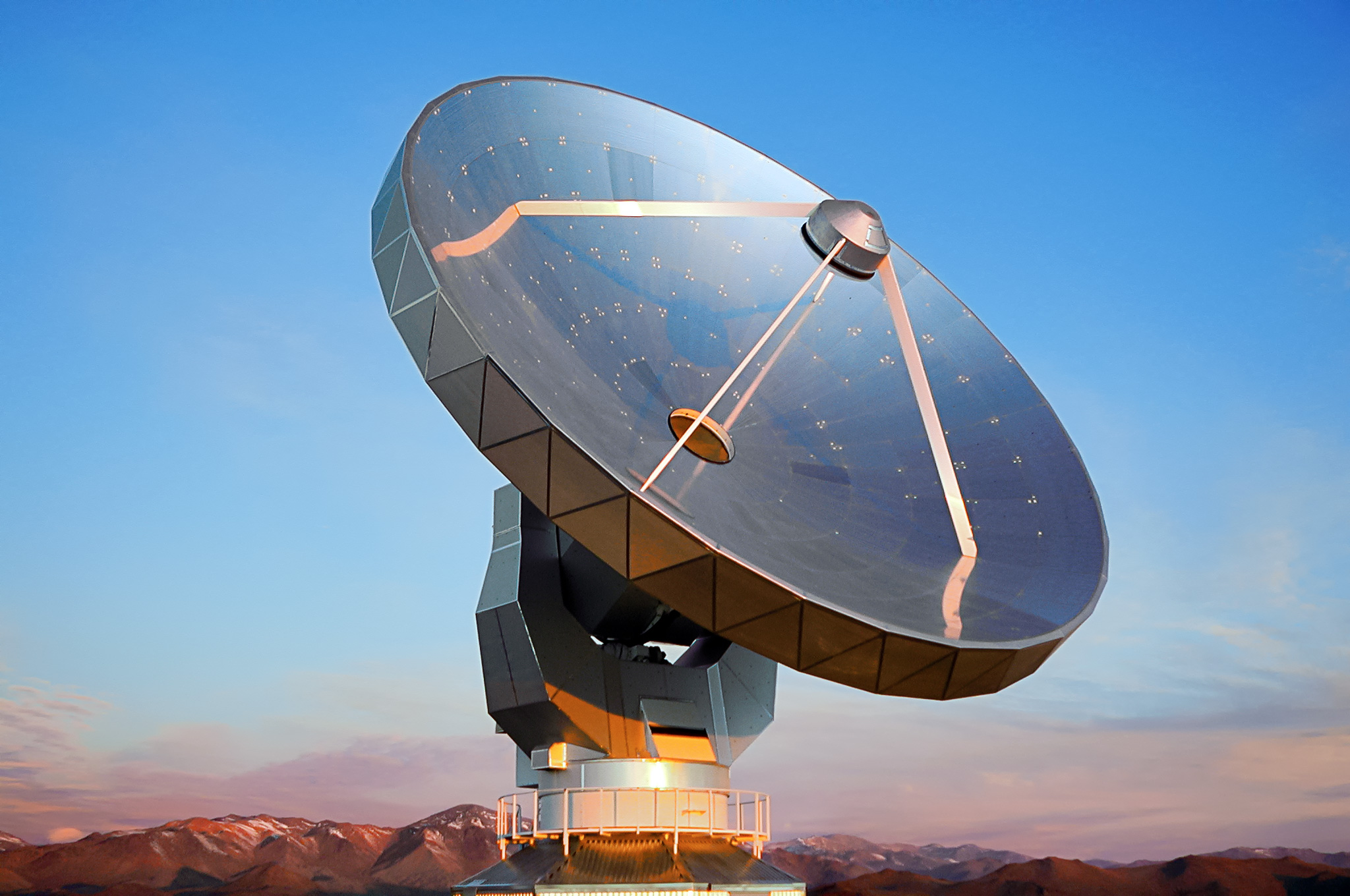
- Swedish-ESO Submillimetre Telescope
- Location: Gamsberg Nature Reserve
- Coordinates: 29°16′S 70°44′W
- Telescope style: radio telescope
- Diameter: 15 m (49 ft 3 in)
- Focal length: 4,875 mm (15 ft 11.9 in)
- Location within Chile
- Related media on Commons

The Swedish-ESO Submillimetre Telescope (SEST) is a 15-metre diameter radio telescope. It is located at the La Silla Observatory in Chile.

== La Silla Observatory, Chile ==
The telescope was built in 1987 as a combined project between ESO and Onsala Space Observatory, with contributions from Finland and Australia. It was then the only large telescope for submillimetre astronomy in the southern hemisphere. It was decommissioned in 2003.

The telescope was used for single-dish observations of a wide range of astronomical objects, especially the Galactic Center and the Magellanic Clouds and for interferometric observations at millimetre wavelengths.

In 1995 observations made with SEST showed that the Boomerang Nebula is the coldest known location in the universe, with a temperature lower than the background radiation.

== Gallery ==
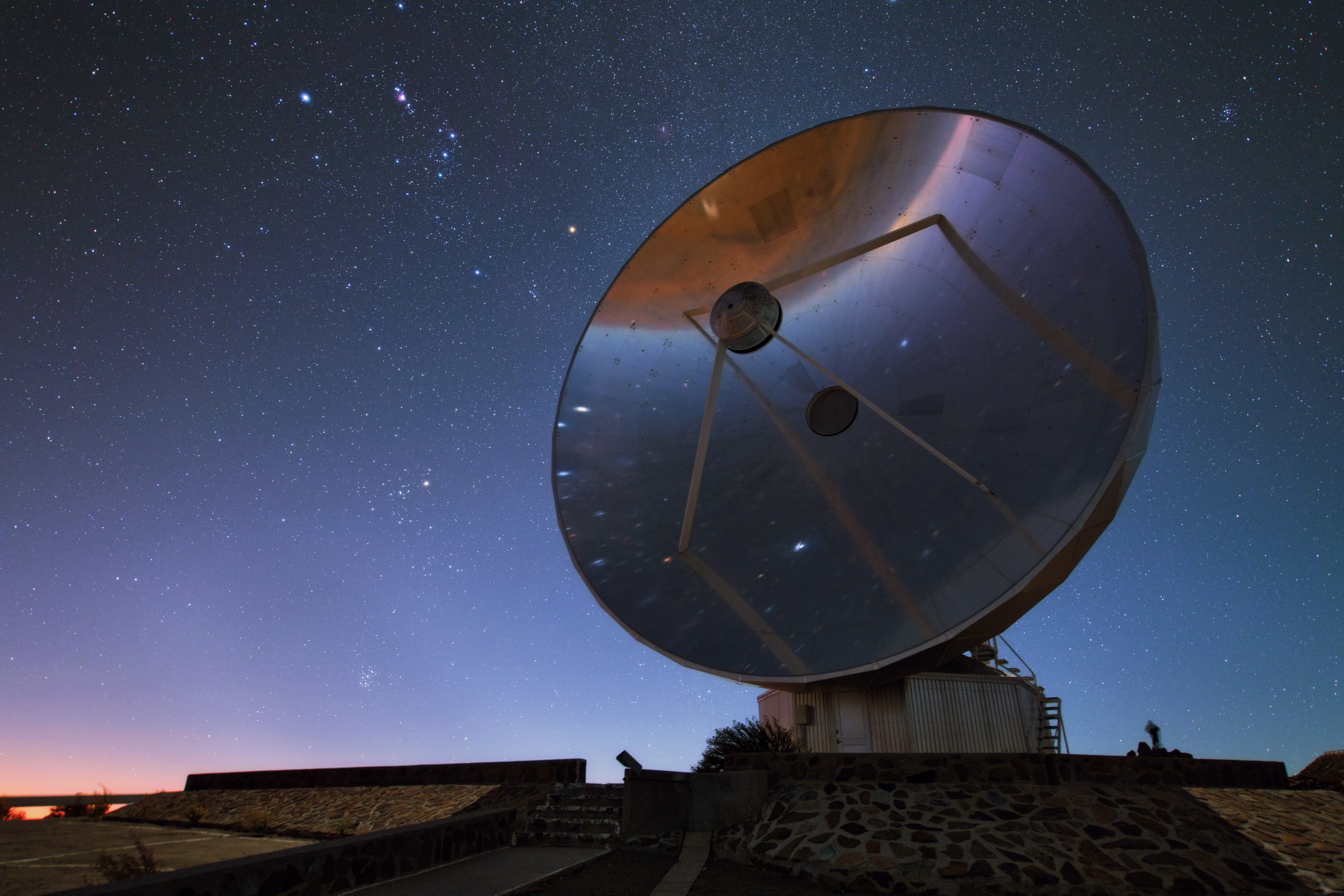
SEST and Orion with his famous belt and sword.

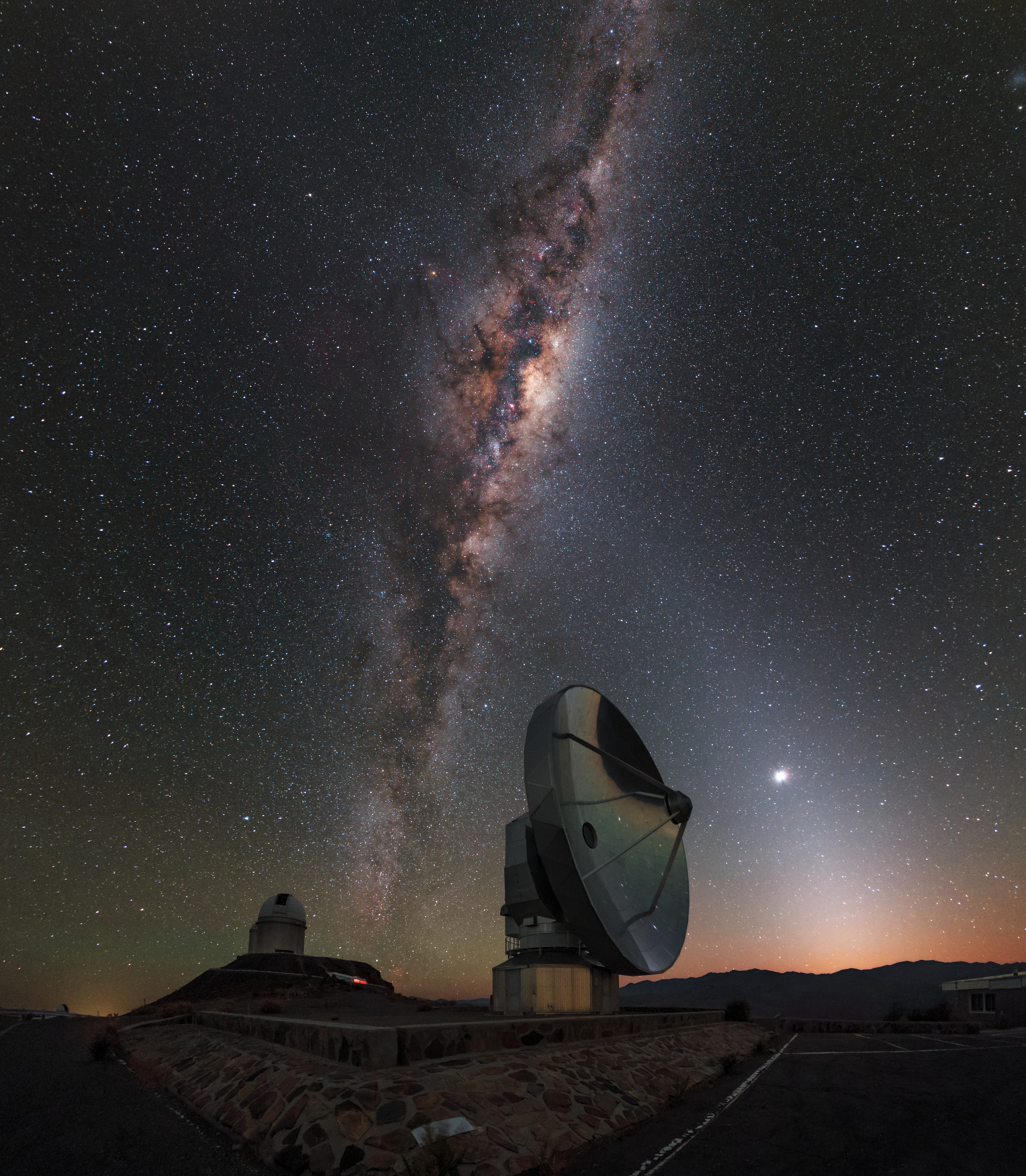
SEST dish measures 15 metres across. It was decommissioned in 2003.

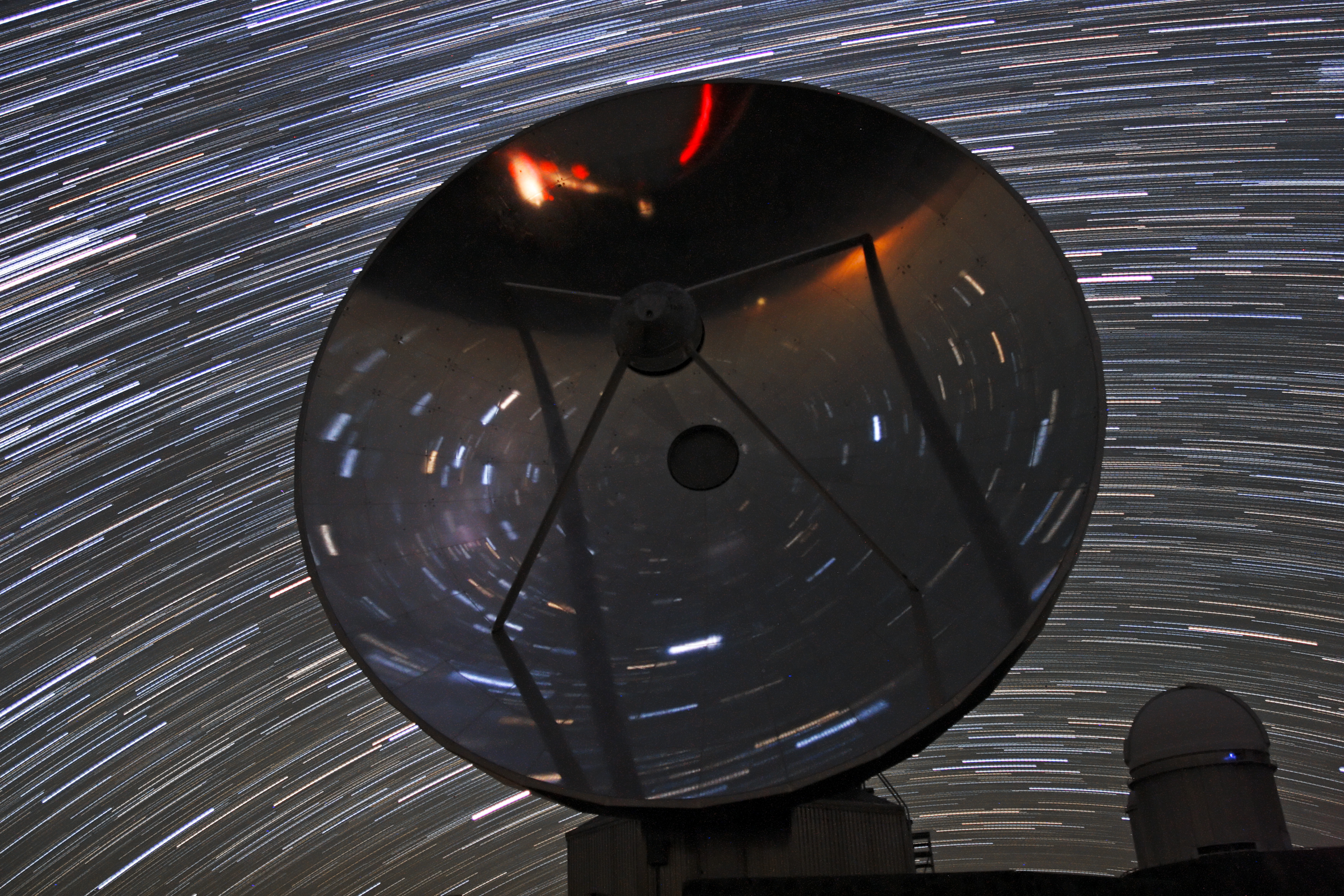
Sky filled with star trails, a result of the camera's long exposure time.

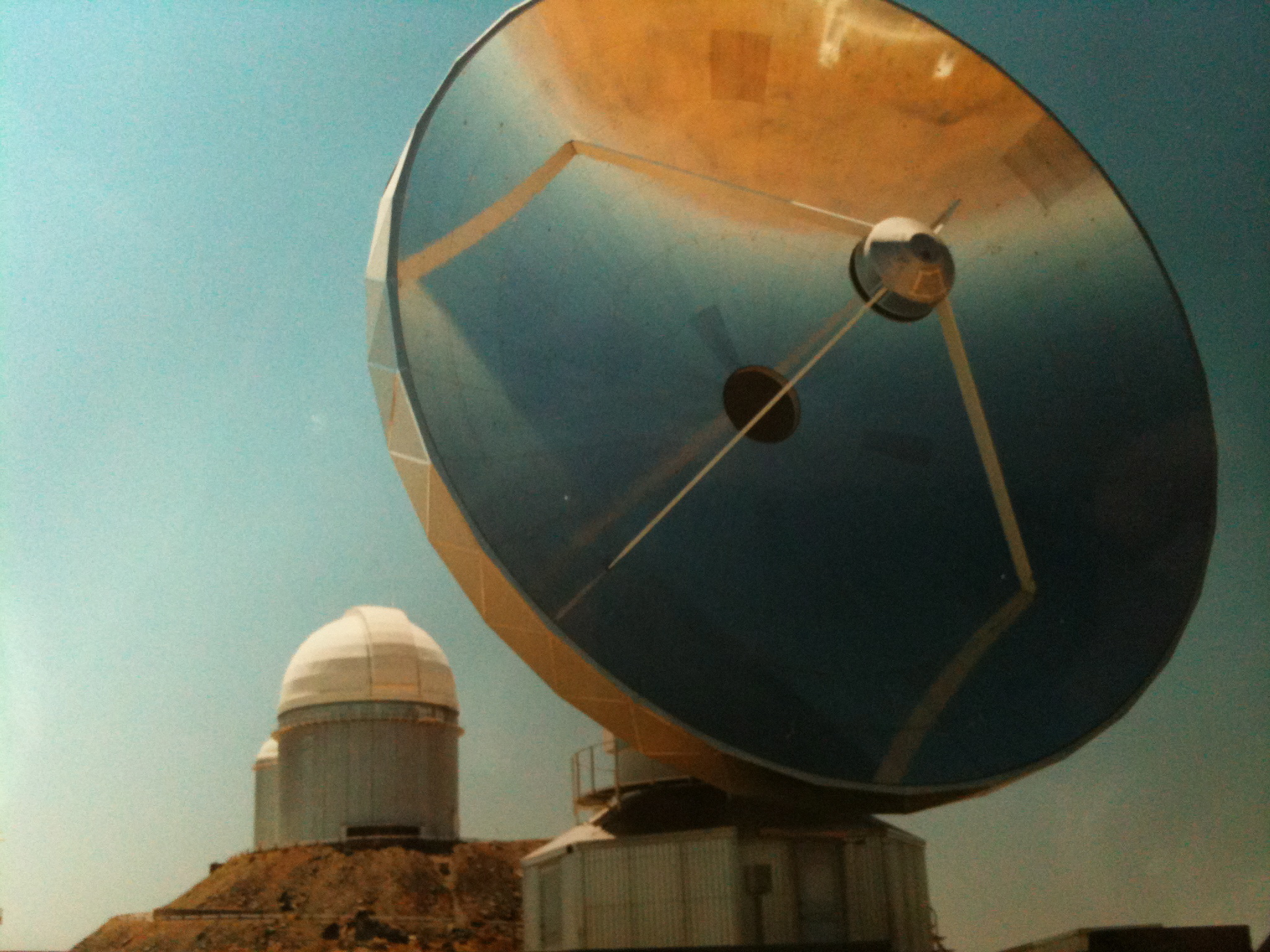
SEST with the ESO 3.6 m Telescope in the background

== See also ==
- Atacama Pathfinder Experiment
