= Rapid Eye Mount telescope =

Telescope in Chile

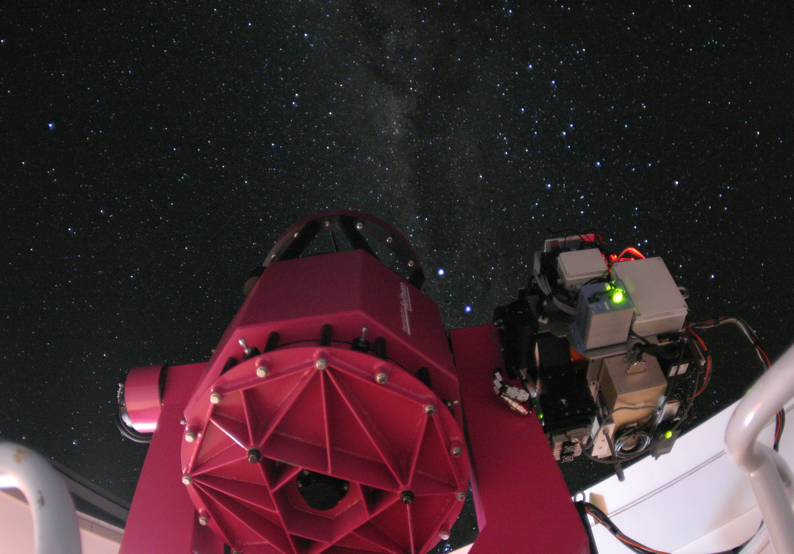
- The REM Telescope pointing at the Milky Way
- Alternative names: REM Telescope
- Location(s): Coquimbo Region, Chile
- Coordinates: 29°15′S 70°44′W
- Altitude: 2,375 m (7,792 ft)
- Wavelength: 450 nm (670 THz)–2,300 nm (130 THz)
- Diameter: 0.6 m (2 ft 0 in)
- Secondary diameter: 0.23 m (9.1 in)
- Focal length: 1.32 m (4 ft 4 in)
- Website: www.rem.inaf.it
- Location of Rapid Eye Mount telescope
- Related media on Commons

The Rapid Eye Mount telescope (REM) is a fully automatic, 60 cm aperture telescope located at ESO's La Silla Observatory at 2,400 metres altitude on the edge of the Atacama Desert in Chile. The telescope's aim is to catch the afterglows of gamma-ray bursts (GRBs). REM is triggered by a signal from a high-energy satellite such as Swift and rapidly points to the detected location in the sky. It is operated for the Italian National Institute for Astrophysics since 2002.

== Telescope ==
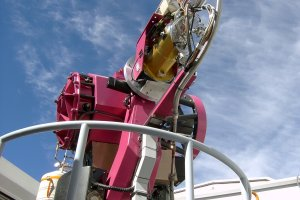
The REM telescope and its instruments in daylight

The telescope has been designed to be a fast pointing instrument, and its relatively small size is in fact balanced by a 10°/s accurate fast pointing. This velocity makes REM suitable for immediate response to random alerts.

The telescope hosts two instruments: REMIR, an infrared imaging camera, and ROS2, a visible imager. The two cameras can observe simultaneously thanks to a dichroic placed before telescope focus the same field of view of 10×10 arc minutes. In the infrared range from 1 to 2.3 μm REMIR can use a (z′, J, H, K′) filter set. ROS2 produces 4 images simultaneously, in the SLOAN-line passbands g, r, i, z'.

The observing procedure is completely robotic and the nightly schedule is optimized for the observation of scheduled targets but it is immediately overdriven by GRB (or other) alerts. Typically REM can observe the new target after 30 seconds from notification.

REM has been installed in its place during June 2003 and has been gathering data on GRB and other sources since then. Also it is a bench for experimental instrumentation and equipment.

In 2006 a wide-field camera parallel to the REM telescope, the TORTORA camera (Telescopio Ottimizzato per la Ricerca dei Transienti Ottici RApidi) was installed. TORTORA has a field of view of 24°x32° through an objective of 120 mm diameter. The instrument was optimized for photometry of fast transients with a best time resolution of about 0.1 s. In 2014 TORTORA was definitely decommissioned and removed from REM.

The observatory is operated for the Instituto Nazionale di Astrofisica by the REM Team. and observing time is offered to the world-wide community on an open sky policy.

== Main results ==
Since its installation and commissioning at ESO, REM rapid and multi-band observations allowed to contribute to several important discoveries in some cases widely reported by ESO press releases; for instance, the observations a few seconds after its discovery of GRB060418, GRB06067A and GRB080319B.

In addition, a larger set of observations of targets different from GRBs has been performed, securing long time series of data for variable stars, AGNs, etc.

== See also ==
- TAROT-South robotic observatory, an even smaller and faster-moving telescope also at La Silla
