= Space Telescope European Coordinating Facility =

European space institution

The Space Telescope – European Coordinating Facility (ST-ECF) was an institution which provided a number of support and service functions primarily for European observers of the NASA/ESA Hubble Space Telescope (HST). It was established in 1984 by the European Space Agency (ESA) and the European Southern Observatory (ESO), and was located at the ESO headquarters in Garching bei München, Germany. The ST-ECF ceased operations on 31 December 2010.

The ST-ECF provided detailed technical information about the HST and its science instruments, supported European astronomers who were preparing HST observing proposals and coordinated the development of computer software tuned to the specific data analysis needs of HST users. In all these duties the ST-ECF staff maintained close contacts with the Space Telescope Science Institute (STScI) in Baltimore, which is charged with the scientific operation of the HST observatory.

The ST-ECF was last headed by Robert (Bob) Fosbury. Deputy was Jeremy Walsh.

== User support ==
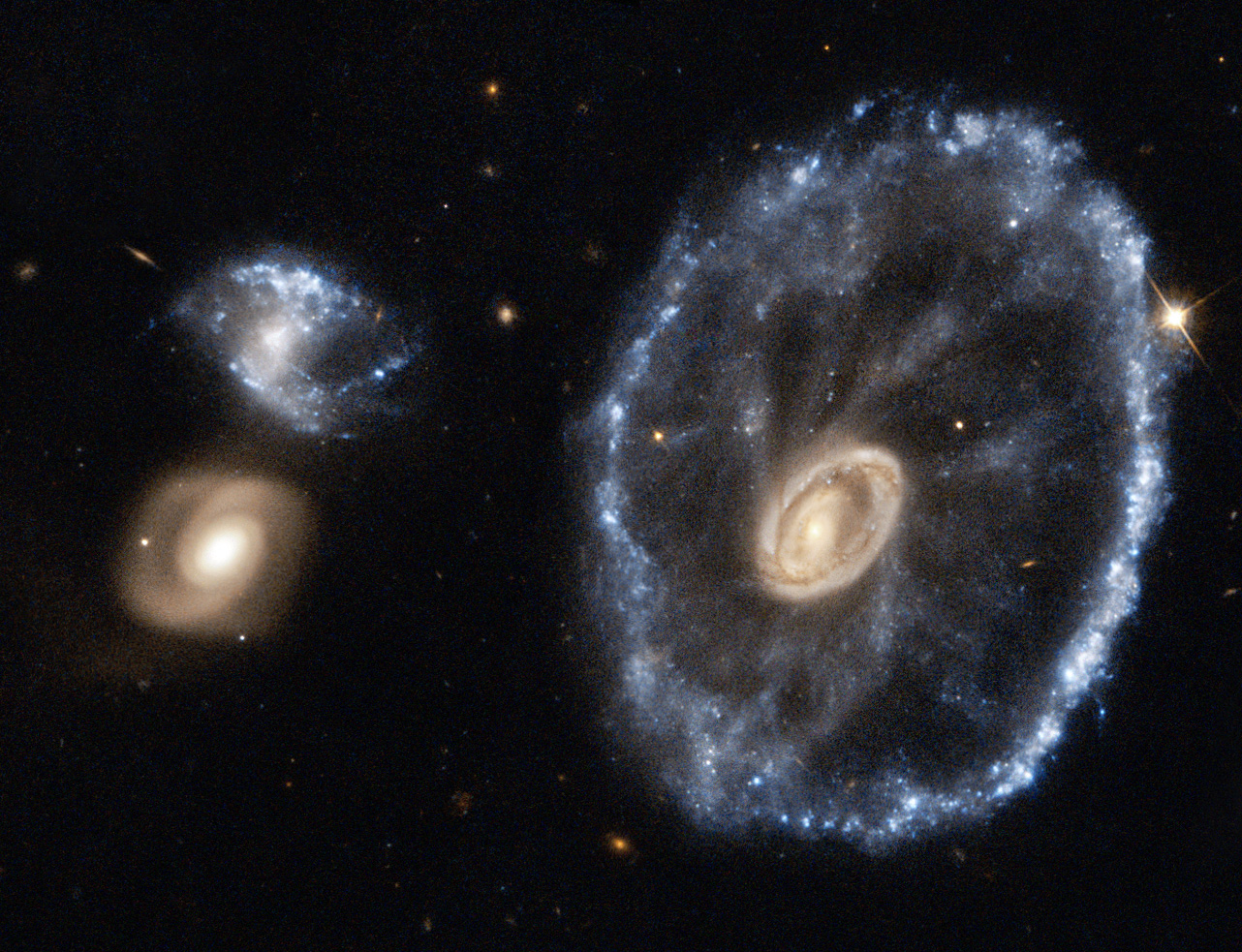
This view of the Cartwheel Galaxy was produced by ST-ECF from Hubble data, and released in December 2010.

Founded before the era of the internet and widely available computer resources the ST-ECF was founded with user support for European astronomers as the main goal. When internet connections across the Atlantic and powerful computers became the mainstay, the focus of the organization shifted towards data product and dedicated instrument science support.

== Instrument science ==
The ST-ECF was actively engaged in software development in many areas related to HST data calibration, analysis and visualisation for especially the Hubble instruments Faint Object Spectrograph, STIS, and Advanced Camera for Surveys. For example:

- aXe – Slitless Spectroscopy Extraction software
- SLIM: A Slitless Spectroscopy Simulator for ACS
- Faint Object Spectrograph Post Operational Archives calibration pipeline (included in STSDAS, done by the Instrument Physical Modeling Group)
- The STIS Spectrograph calibration enhancement project (done by the Instrument Physical Modeling Group)
- NICMOSlook and Calnic C
- Lucy-Hook coaddition method

== Science archive ==
Together with the European Southern Observatory (ESO) the ST-ECF operated and maintained the ESO/ST-ECF Science Archive Facility from where all the scientific data collected by the Hubble Space Telescope could be accessed by the public. In collaboration with the HST archives at the STScI and the Canadian Astronomy Data Centre (CADC) data products and access methods were continuously improved to assure the best possible science data for astronomers around the world. This includes work on the Virtual Observatory, On-The-Fly Calibration, and B Associations. Earlier work pioneered projects like Astrovirtel and Astrophysical Virtual Observatory.

After the closure of ST-ECF the European HST Archive were moved to ESA's European Space Astronomy Centre in Spain, where most of ESA's Space Science Archives are located and operated from.

== Public outreach and education ==
One of the groups at the ST-ECF was the Hubble European Space Agency Information Centre (HEIC), which, since 1999, has been the leading Hubble outreach activities group in Europe (headed by the science communication specialist Lars Lindberg Christensen and graphic designer Martin Kornmesser). HEIC's mission statement is to fulfill the Hubble Space Telescope outreach and education tasks for the European Space Agency.

HEIC became a very distinguished communication office of experts using the newest software and techniques. After the closure of ST-ECF the Outreach component continued on an ESO contract for ESA, as part of ESO's Education and Public Outreach department.

The ESA/Hubble office has produced large amounts of astronomical material – press releases, images, brochures, web pages, books etc. – suitable both for educational purposes and wider public consumption. HEIC provided a well-assorted archive that is publicly available on its web page.

The work is centred on the production of news and photo releases that highlight interesting Hubble science results and images. These are often European in origin, and so not only increase the awareness of European Space Agency’s Hubble share (15%), but the contribution of European scientists to the observatory. Furthermore the group produces video releases, innovative educational material, CD-ROMs, brochures, posters, as well as DVDs and museum information kiosks, and much more.

All publicised material can be found on spacetelescope.org. The group is home to the FITS Liberator project and the "Hubble – 15 Years of Discovery" project that also led to the book Hubble - 15 Years of Discovery.
