= Drizzle (image processing) =

Astrophotography image processing method

Drizzle (or DRIZZLE) is a digital image processing method for the linear reconstruction of undersampled images. The method is normally used for the combination of astronomical images and was originally developed by the Hubble Deep Field observations made for the Hubble Space Telescope. The algorithm, known as variable-pixel linear reconstruction, or informally as "Drizzle", preserves photometry and resolution, can weight input images according to the statistical significance of each pixel, and removes the effects of geometric distortion on both image shape and photometry. In addition, it is possible to use drizzling to combine dithered images in the presence of cosmic rays.

Drizzling is commonly used by amateur astrophotographers, particularly for processing large amounts of planetary image data (typically several thousand frames), drizzling in astrophotography applications can also be used to recover higher resolution stills from terrestrial video recordings. According to astrophotographer David Ratledge, "Results using the DRIZZLE command can be spectacular with amateur instruments."

== Overview ==
Camera optics generally introduce geometric distortion of images. Undersampled images are, for example, common in astronomy because instrument designers are frequently forced to choose between properly sampling a small field of view and undersampling a larger field. This is a particular problem for the Hubble Space Telescope (HST), where the corrected optics may provide superb resolution, but the detectors are only able to take full advantage of the full resolving power of the telescope over a limited field of view. Fortunately, much of the information lost to undersampling can be restored. The most commonly used of these techniques are shift-and-add and interlacing.

Drizzle was originally developed to combine the dithered images of the Hubble Deep Field North and has since been widely used for the combination of dithered images from both HST's cameras and those on other telescopes. Drizzle has the versatility of shift-and-add, yet largely maintains the resolution and independent noise statistics of interlacing. Drizzle has the advantage of being able to handle images with essentially arbitrary shifts, rotations, and geometric distortion and, when given input images with proper associated weight maps, creates an optimal statistically summed image. Drizzle also naturally handles images with "missing" data, due, for instance, to corruption by cosmic rays or detector defects.

Originally packaged with the Space Telescope Science Data Analysis System (STSDAS) package in the now deprecated IRAF, Drizzle (now called MultiDrizzle) is freely available in the Drizzlepac Python package. In addition to Drizzle, a number of ancillary tasks that assist in the combination of Hubble Space Telescope imaging data are available as part of the Drizzlepac package. Detailed descriptions of the process and tutorials are provided in the Drizzlepac Handbook.

Drizzle was developed as a collaboration between the Space Telescope Science Institute and the Space Telescope European Coordinating Facility.
