= POA CALFOS =

POA CALFOS is the improved Post Operational Archive version of the Faint Object Spectrograph (FOS) calibration pipeline, an earlier instrument aboard the Hubble Space Telescope (HST). STScI made an improved version of the FOS calibration pipeline called POA_CALFOS. POA CALFOS replaces CALFOS, which performed the routine calibration of FOS data in the standard IRAF/STSDAS FOS calibration pipeline. The current version corrects for image motion problems that have led to significant wavelength scale uncertainties in the FOS data archive. The improvements in the calibration enhance the scientific value of the data in the FOS archive, making it a more homogeneous and reliable resource.

The Faint Object Spectrograph was one of the 4 original axial instruments aboard the HST. FOS was designed to make spectroscopic observations of astrophysical sources from the near ultraviolet to the near infrared. The instrument was removed from HST during the Second Servicing Mission in February 1997 and replaced by the Space Telescope Imaging Spectrograph (STIS). Consequently, no more new FOS observations can be made, and only Archival Research programs may be submitted to make use of FOS data. The Instrument Physical Modeling Group (IPMG) of the Space Telescope European Coordinating Facility (ST-ECF) currently has the main responsibility for FOS.
