= Hubble: 15 Years of Discovery =

- Author: Lars Lindberg Christensen; Bob Fosbury
- Illustrator: Martin Kornmesser
- Language: English
- Genre: Non-fiction
- Publisher: Springer
- Publication date: 1990
- ISBN: 0-387-28599-7

Hubble – 15 Years of Discovery (ISBN 0-387-28599-7) is a book that formed part of the European Space Agency's 15th anniversary celebration activities for the 1990 launch of the NASA/ESA Hubble Space Telescope. Its main emphasis is on the exquisite Hubble images that have enabled astronomers to gain entirely new insights into the workings of a huge range of different astronomical objects. Hubble has provided the visual overview of the underlying astrophysical processes taking place in these objects, ranging from planets in the Solar System to galaxies in the young Universe. This book shows the close relationship between the results of great scientific value and of eye-catching beauty and artistic potential.

The book published by Springer has 120 pages, measures 30 x 25 cm and is in full-colour. It has been translated into Finnish, Portuguese and German. Some versions include a copy of the Hubble – 15 Years of Discovery documentary (distributed in 860,000 copies).

The book is authored by Lars Lindberg Christensen and Bob Fosbury. It is illustrated by Martin Kornmesser.
