= OTFC =

OTFC may refer to:

- Omagh Town F.C.
- On-The-Fly Calibration
- Ossett Town F.C.
