= Bandpass (disambiguation) =

Bandpass or band-pass may refer to:

- Band-pass filter
- Bandpass signal
- Bandpass sampling

== See also ==
- Passband
