= Hubble European Space Agency Information Centre =

The Hubble European Space Agency Information Centre (HEIC) is a science communication office, established at the Space Telescope - European Coordinating Facility (ST-ECF) in Munich, Germany late in 1999. This initiative was taken so as to fulfil the NASA/ESA Hubble Space Telescope (HST) outreach and education tasks for the European Space Agency (ESA), as outlined in an agreement between NASA and ESA.

Over the past few years HEIC has become a very distinguished communication office of experts using the newest software and techniques. The European Hubble office has produced large amounts of astronomical material suitable both for educational purposes and wider public consumption. HEIC provides a well-assorted archive that is publicly available on its web page.

The work is centred on the production of news and photo releases that highlight interesting Hubble science results and images. These are often European in origin, and so not only increase the awareness of ESA's Hubble share (15%), but the contribution of European scientists to the observatory. Furthermore, the group produces video releases, innovative educational material, CD-ROMs, brochures, posters, as well as DVDs and museum information kiosks, and much more.

The Hubble Information Centre is headed by the science communication specialist Lars Lindberg Christensen and the lead graphic designer is Martin Kornmesser.
