= Chi2 Orionis =

Star in the constellation Orion

χ^{2} Orionis
- Location of χ^{2} Orionis (circled)

Observation data Epoch J2000.0 Equinox J2000.0 (ICRS)
- Constellation: Orion
- Right ascension: 06^{h} 03^{m} 55.18437^{s}
- Declination: +20° 08′ 18.4281″
- Apparent magnitude (V): 4.63

Characteristics
- Evolutionary stage: Blue supergiant
- Spectral type: B2Ia
- U−B color index: −0.68
- B−V color index: +0.28
- R−I color index: +0.22
- Variable type: α Cyg

Astrometry
Radial velocity (R_{v})	16.8±0.9 km/s
Proper motion (μ)	RA: 2.679 mas/yr Dec.: −2.500 mas/yr
Parallax (π)	0.7636±0.1219 mas
Distance	approx. 4,300 ly (approx. 1,300 pc)
Absolute magnitude (M_{V})	−7.6

Details
Mass	42.3±1.0 M_{☉}
Radius	61.9 R_{☉}
Luminosity	446,000 L_{☉}
Surface gravity (log g)	2.35 cgs
Temperature	19,000 K
Rotational velocity (v sin i)	72 km/s
Age	5±0.6 Myr

Other designations
- χ^{2} Ori, Chi^{2} Orionis, Chi^{2} Ori, 62 Orionis, 62 Ori, BD+20 1233, GC 7675, HD 41117, HIP 28716, HR 2135, PPM 95316, SAO 77911

Database references
SIMBAD	data

Chi^{2} Orionis (Chi^{2} Ori / χ^{2} Orionis / χ^{2} Ori) /kaɪ.tuːˈɒraɪ/ is a B-type blue supergiant star in the constellation of Orion. It has an apparent visual magnitude of 4.63 but being quite distant, and heavily extinguished it burns with the greatest absolute visual light magnitude among stars in Orion within the near reaches of the galaxy, 0.9 of a magnitude brighter than Rigel. Since 1943, the spectrum of this star has served as one of the stable anchor points by which other stars are classified. It is considered to be a member of the Gemini OB1 association.

In apparent brightness it ranks, within Orion, admitting the higher published mean brightness of much more variable stars ranked above it, 35th.

Chi^{1} Orionis is an unrelated, yellow, main sequence star over two degrees away and far closer to the Sun.

== Spectrum ==
χ^{2} Orionis has a B2 bright supergiant spectrum and is one of the standard B2 Ia stars. It has been reported as having unusually narrow absorption lines and some weak emission lines and was included as one of the original Be stars. It is no longer treated as a Be star since many supergiants show some emission features at high resolution and Be stars is usually defined to exclude supergiants.

== Variability ==
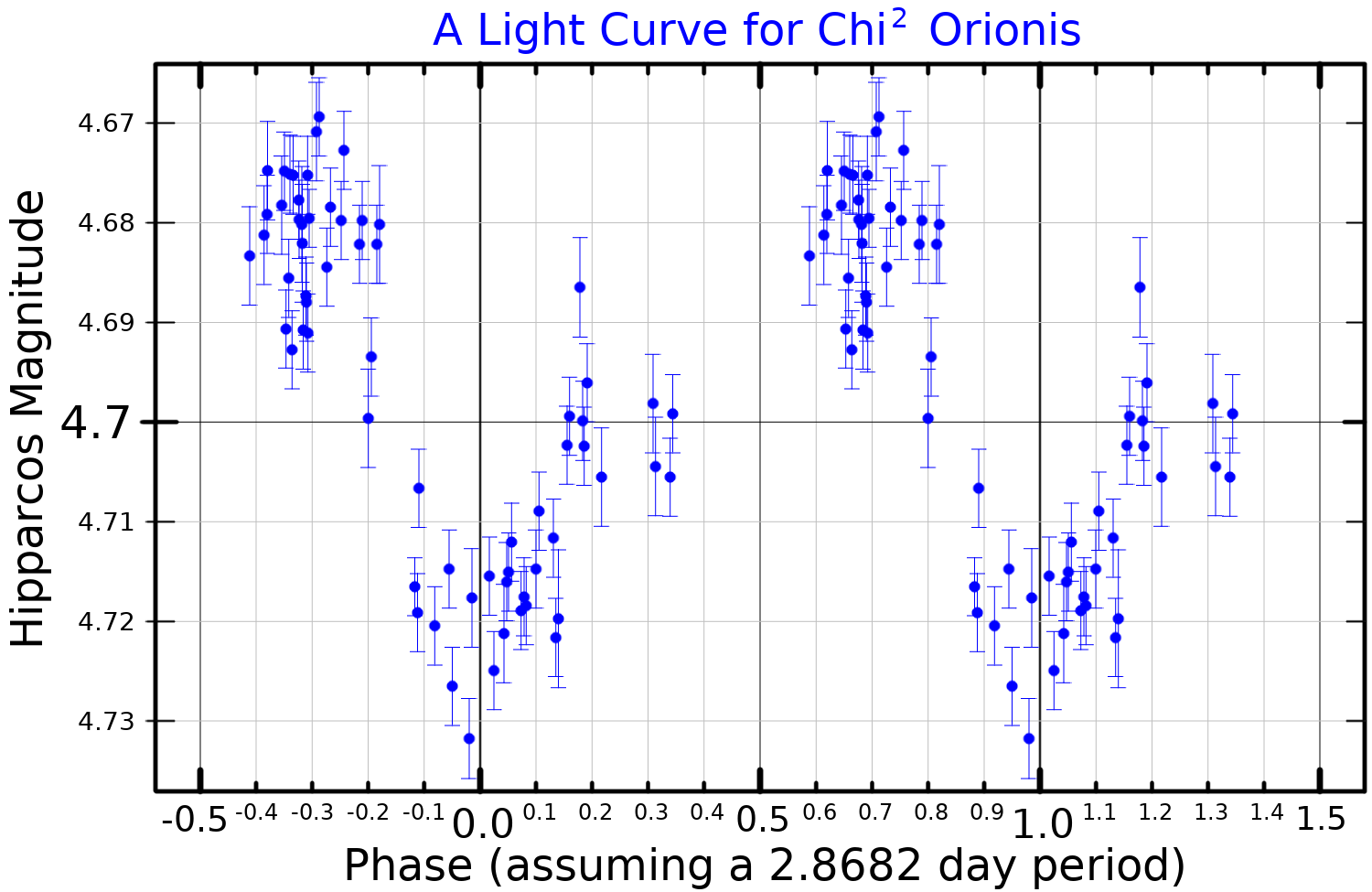
A light curve for Chi^{2} Orionis, plotted from Hipparcos data

χ^{2} Orionis was listed as having likely small amplitude variability in photometry for the Third Catalogue of Stars measured in the Geneva Observatory Photometric System, specifically varying by 22 thousandths of a magnitude. It was included in the General Catalogue of Variable Stars based on Hipparcos satellite photometry with a magnitude range (in the Hipparchos photometric system) of 4.68 - 4.72 and a period of 2.8 days. A detailed study of the Hipparcos photometry confirmed the star as an α Cyg variable and gave the amplitude of variation as 0.057 magnitudes.
