= ID2299 =

Elliptical galaxy located in the Sextans constellation

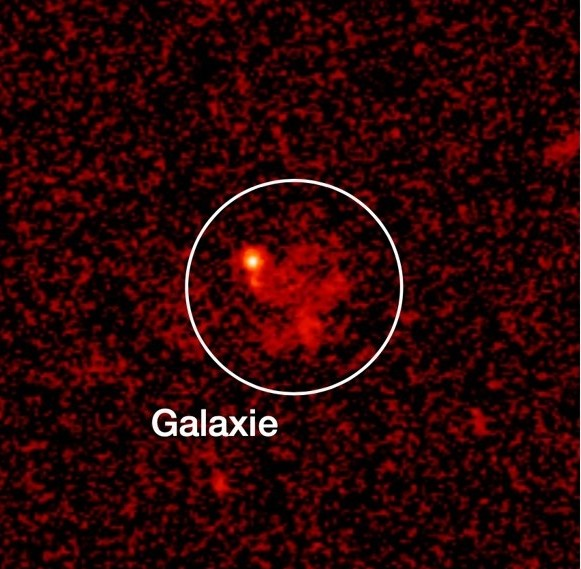
- Image of ID2299 taken with Hubble Space Telescope.
- Event type: Observation
- Date: 11 January 2021
- Duration: few minutes
- Instrument: ALMA
- Constellation: Sextans
- Right ascension: 10^{h} 02^{m} 15.4^{s}
- Declination: +01° 54′ 5.3″
- Distance: 9 billion light years
- Related media on Commons

ID2299 is an elliptical galaxy 9 billion light-years away. It was found and detailed in January 2021, due to its phenomenon of catastrophic gas loss. This is due, unless the prolonged observations are inexplicably misleading or a poorly understood mechanism is at hand, to a catastrophic merger – prompting a secondary part of the galaxy that hosts rapid star formation. ID2299's high star formation rate is far outweighed by its ejection of gas. Its trailing tail has grown to approximately half of its size. ID2299 is extrapolated to lose so much more gas that it will only remain active – capable of new star formation – for a few more tens of millions of years.

== Observation ==
This galaxy has been observed for the first time thanks to the Atacama Large Millimeter Array (ALMA) telescope, which is the biggest radio telescope worldwide, in Chile, which scans the sky looking for distant variations in radiation. Astronomers observed an extreme instance of the "death" of a galaxy, by losing its gas. An impression has been made by Martin Kornmesser, a graphist at ESA (the European Space Agency). This represents, in intensified form, the visible and near-visible wavelength corrollaries to the seen radiation, which cannot be picked up with present equipment due to great lengthening of wavelength (redshift). On 11 January 2021 the study was published in the journal Nature Astronomy.

== Characteristics ==
=== Distance ===
The light from this galaxy is deemed to be 9 billion light-years from the Earth, having taken that time to reach the Earth. When astronomers observe ID2299, it is as it was 4.5 billion years ago, while it is extrapolated that it is now about 13 billion light years away.

=== Context ===
Deep space astronomic observations strongly imply around 2,000 billion galaxies exist or have existed, each on average composed of billions to hundreds of billions of stars. Every galaxy has a key component of gas, which allows them to produce stars, and when all these die, and no more are creating, the galaxy will cease to exist. This can happens well before tens of billions of years if a galaxy becomes inactive such as by losing virtually all the interstellar gas. Such a loss makes it impossible to create new stars.

=== Composition ===
ID2299 is observed with extreme – and very likely total – gas loss underway, which it ejects as a tidal tail. The 46% which forms the tail is being augmented at a rate of around 10000 M_{☉} per year. Within the other 54%, are intense zones of star production totalling about 550 M_{☉} per year. To compare, the Milky Way now births about 3 M_{☉} per year. If it continues at this rhythm, or similar, the galaxy has only a few tens of millions of years left for star production, a very minute fraction of cosmic history.

=== Explanation ===
Major gas loss had been modelled as likely either from stellar winds, from star formation or from relativistic jets and other ejections from the supermassive black hole and its sphere of influence, in the galactic nucleus. The accretion of matter there is accompanied by the emission of large amounts of energy and the appearance of powerful winds, capable of sweeping away the galaxy's gas. ID2299's data to a high probability presents to ESA scientists another mechanism: the collision of galaxies. Even if astronomers only observed the galaxy for few minutes, they concluded that this tidal tail, which will lead to the death of ID2299 is the result of a catastrophic collision between two galaxies, integral to the form and fate of ID2299. In this earlier stage of the universe galaxies were closer together so more mergers took place, many dislodging high quantities of their respective interstellar matter.

This catastrophic merger mechanism, if matched by very similar observations as the working group hypothesises it will be, has contributed to shape the make-up and distribution of the later surviving galaxies – including their host galaxy clusters and superclusters as we see in the more local universe.
