= On the Fly =

On the Fly may refer to:

- On the fly, a phrase used to describe something that is being changed while the process that the change affects is ongoing
- On the Fly (album), a 2007 album by Irish folk group Patrick Street
- On the Fly (TV series), a 2012 American reality documentary television series on TLC
- On-The-Fly Calibration in observational astronomy
- On-the-fly encryption, a method used by some disk encryption software
- On-the-fly programming or live coding, improvised and interactive
