= NICMOSlook =

Software to analyze spectral data obtained with the NICMOS spectrometer

Screenshot of NICMOSlook

NICMOSlook is a computer program to analyze spectral data obtained with the Near Infrared Camera and Multi-Object Spectrometer (NICMOS) on board the Hubble Space Telescope (HST). The program originated as Calnic C, which was designed at the Space Telescope European Coordinating Facility (ST-ECF) and programmed in IDL. NICMOSlook is available from their website.

One of the capabilities of NICMOS is its grism mode for slitless spectrometry at low resolution. Typically, a direct image is taken in conjunction with grism images for wavelength calibration. NICMOSlook is a highly specialized interactive tool to extract one-dimensional spectra (flux versus wavelength) from such data.

NICMOSlook is most commonly used for small amounts of data when users prefer to have full control of all the parameters for individual spectrum extraction, or for cases where Calnic C did not extract the spectra satisfactorily. Unlike Calnic C, NICMOSlook requires the user to determine the best way to find an object and provides a number of different ways to accomplish this. Similarly, the user decides whether to use a weighting appropriate for point sources or weighting by the size of the object for the extraction of the spectra.

== Calnic C ==
Calnic C is a non-interactive counterpart, a program that performs a subset of NICMOSlook's functions with a "pipelined" approach. Maintenance of Calnic C stopped in 2000 and the program is now considered to be obsolete.
