= Astronomy Visualization Metadata =

Digital astronomical image tagging format

Astronomy Visualization Metadata (AVM) is a standard for tagging digital astronomical images stored in formats such as JPEG, GIF, PNG and TIFF. The AVM standard extends the concept of Extensible Metadata Platform (XMP) headers to include useful astronomical information about the subject of the image as well as the telescope used to take the image. This ensures that relevant information is transferred with the image when it is shared with others. AVM could be considered analogous to the FITS headers associated with raw astronomical data files.

The standard was proposed by the Virtual Astronomy Multimedia Project, part of the IAU Commission 55 and the International Virtual Observatory Alliance. It reached version 1.1 on May 14, 2008. The standard is currently used to tag images from the Chandra X-ray Observatory, Herschel Space Observatory, Spitzer Space Telescope, ESA/Hubble and the European Southern Observatory. Software packages such as PinpointWCS, FITS Liberator and Microsoft WorldWide Telescope have implemented the standard. Additionally, the Custom Metadata Panel for Adobe Bridge, Illustrator, Photoshop and Premiere Pro includes a pre-configured panel for AVM metadata.

The metadata include information about the creator of the image, the content (including description and subject category), the method of observation (including facility, instrument and spectral information), the World Coordinate System (WCS) position in the sky, and the publisher of the image.

AVM was conceived by Robert Hurt, Lars Lindberg Christensen, and Adrienne Gauthier.

== Metadata Categories ==
The Astronomy Visualization Metadata standard defines a taxonomy for astronomical objects. The main categories are:

1. Planet
2. Interplanetary Body
3. Star
4. Nebula
5. Galaxy
6. Cosmology
7. Sky Phenomenon
8. Technology
9. People
