= Lucy–Hook coaddition method =

Image processing technique

The Lucy–Hook coaddition method is an image processing technique for combining sub-stepped astronomical image data onto a finer grid. The method allows the option of resolution and contrast enhancement or the choice of a conservative, re-convolved, output.

Tests with very deep Hubble Space Telescope Wide Field and Planetary Camera 2 (WFPC2) imaging data of excellent quality show that these methods can be very effective and allow fine-scale features to be studied better than on the unprocessed images. The Lucy–Hook coaddition method is an extension of the standard Richardson–Lucy deconvolution iterative restoration method.

For many purposes it may be more convenient to combine dithered datasets using the Drizzle method.
