= FITS Liberator =

Software program

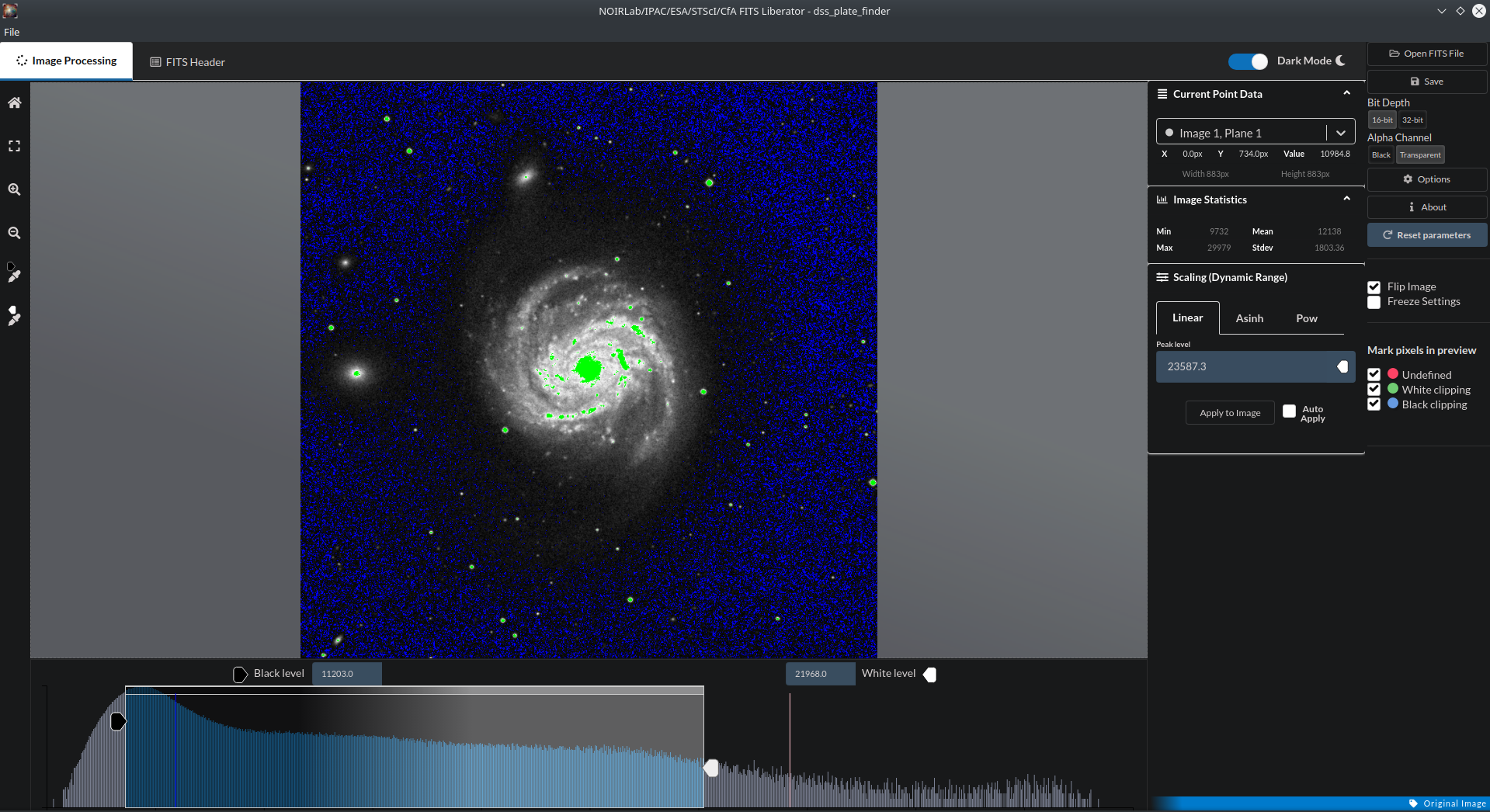
- Original author: ESA/ESO/NASA/NSF/NOIRLab/Caltech IPAC/STScI/CFA.
- Developers: Lars Lindberg Christensen, Davide De Martin, David Zambrano Lizarazo, Juan Fajardo Barrero, Robert Hurt, Javier Enciso, Kaspar K. Nielsen, Teis Johansen, & Lars Holm Nielsen
- Stable release: 5.0 / 26 November 2025
- Written in: C++ / JavaScript
- Operating system: Linux, Windows, macOS
- License: BSD-3 license
- Website: noirlab.edu/public/products/fitsliberator/
- Repository: https://gitlab.com/noirlab/fits-liberator-gui

The ESA/ESO/NASA FITS (Flexible Image Transport System) Liberator is a free software program for processing and editing astronomical data in the FITS format to reproduce images of the universe. Version 3 and later are standalone programs; earlier versions were plugins for Adobe Photoshop. FITS Liberator is free software released under the BSD-3 license. The engine behind the FITS Liberator is NASA's CFITSIO library.

Although the first version of the software was a tool used mainly by professional astronomers, efforts have been made to bring the tool to the homes of educators and students. The FITS Liberator has become the industry standard for professional imaging scientists at the European Space Agency (ESA), the European Southern Observatory (ESO), and the U.S. National Aeronautics and Space Administration (NASA). It uses images from the Hubble Space Telescope (HST) and the Very Large Telescope (VLT), among others, to craft astronomical images.

The first and second versions of the FITS Liberator were released in July 2004 and August 2005 respectively, the version, v3.0.1, was released in February 2012.

== Versions ==
=== Version 1 ===
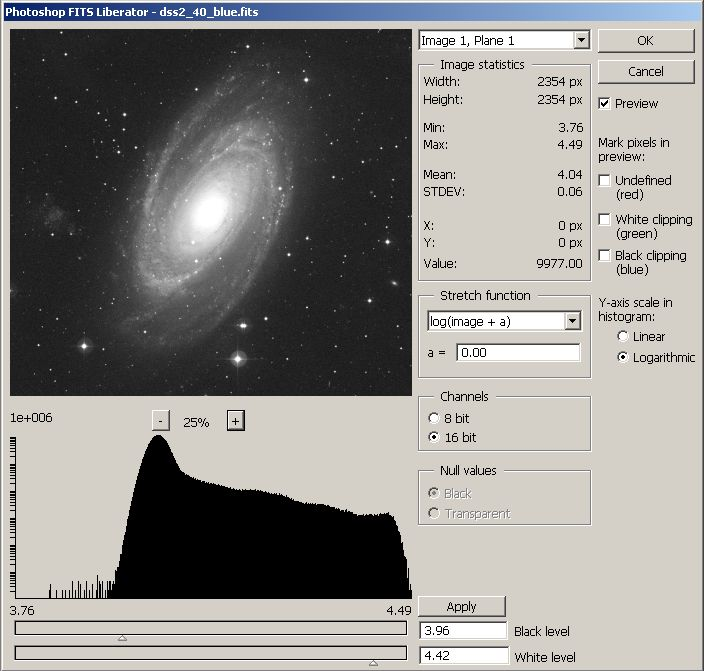
Screenshot FITS Liberator Version 1

Version 1 of the ESA/ESO/NASA Photoshop FITS Liberator was completed in July 2004 by imaging scientists at the European Space Agency (ESA), the European Southern Observatory (ESO), and the National Aeronautics and Space Administration (NASA). Version 1 allowed all types of FITS images to be opened and also some limited interaction with the images.

=== Version 2 ===
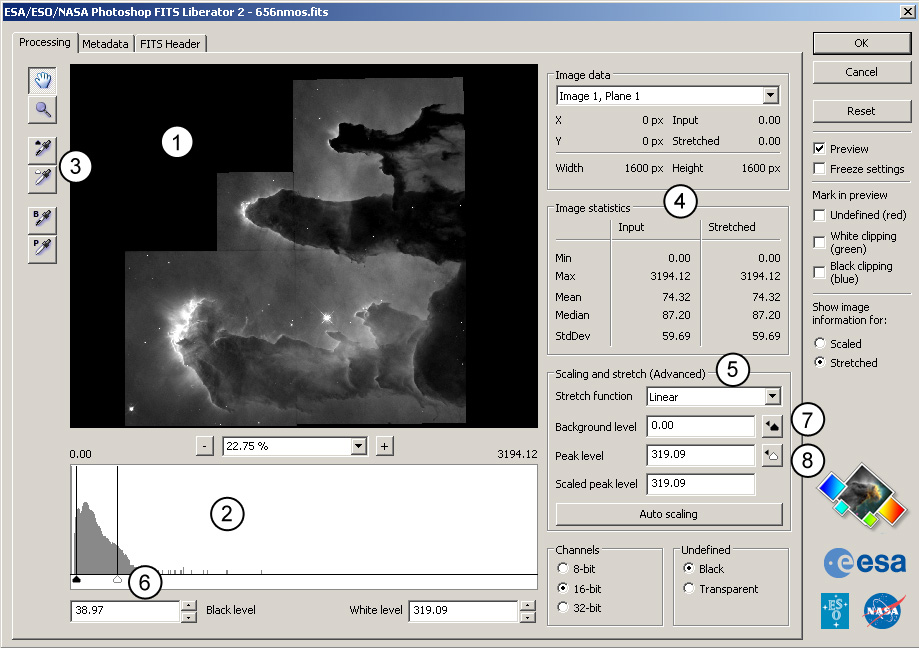
Screenshot FITS Liberator Version two. The image is labeled: 1. The preview window 2. Histogram window 3. Tools 4. Statistics 5. Advanced tools for scaling and stretching 6. Histogram editor 7. Background brightness slider 8. Peak brightness slider

The basic workflow is to open a FITS image, study it in the Preview window, adjust the black-and-white levels (6) to give a reasonable contrast and then set the input range for the scaling of the image by clicking the Auto Scaling Button (7). Test different values of the Scaled Peak level to scale the image to better fit with one of the possible Stretch functions (8).

Version 2 of the ESA/ESO/NASA Photoshop FITS Liberator image processing software made it easier and faster to create colour images from raw observations. Updates included:

- FITS images with up to 4 billion grey scales can be processed (32 bit support).
- FITS images with up to 500 million pixels or more can be processed (100 times larger than standard images from a digital camera).
- Re-designed workflow and user interface. The plug-in remembers previous settings.
- New options for advanced scaling and stretching.

A section of v2.0 was dedicated to metadata input and the user also was given access to a text version of the original FITS header.

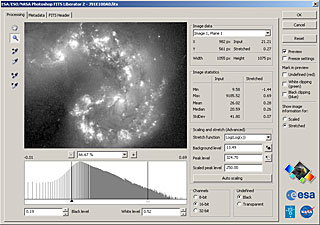
Screenshot FITS Liberator Version 2.1

An updated version of the software containing new scaling and stretching tools allows more manipulation of astronomical images. An update in v2.1 allows users to embed descriptive information about the image and what it shows within the final image. Based on a new standard for Astronomy Visualization Metadata (AVM), this information is stored in the standard manner comparable to that used by digital cameras to record exposure information.

The ESA/ESO/NASA WFPC2 Mosaicator: This add-on tool works on Hubble WFPC2 images. It generates a WFPC2 mosaic file from one WFPC2 file containing four CCD images in individual planes.

The ESA/ESO/NASA FITS Concatenator: This Adobe Photoshop script combines the metadata from two or more individual exposures after the FITS Liberation process.

=== Version 3 ===
Version 3.0 of the FITS Liberator included the following new features:

- FITS Liberator became a stand-alone application, no longer requiring Adobe Photoshop.
- Processing medium-sized images became up to 35% faster due to improved memory management.
- Processing large images became faster, due to delayed application of stretch functions.
- FITS Liberator now saves TIFF files that opened in most image processing software.

=== Version 4 ===
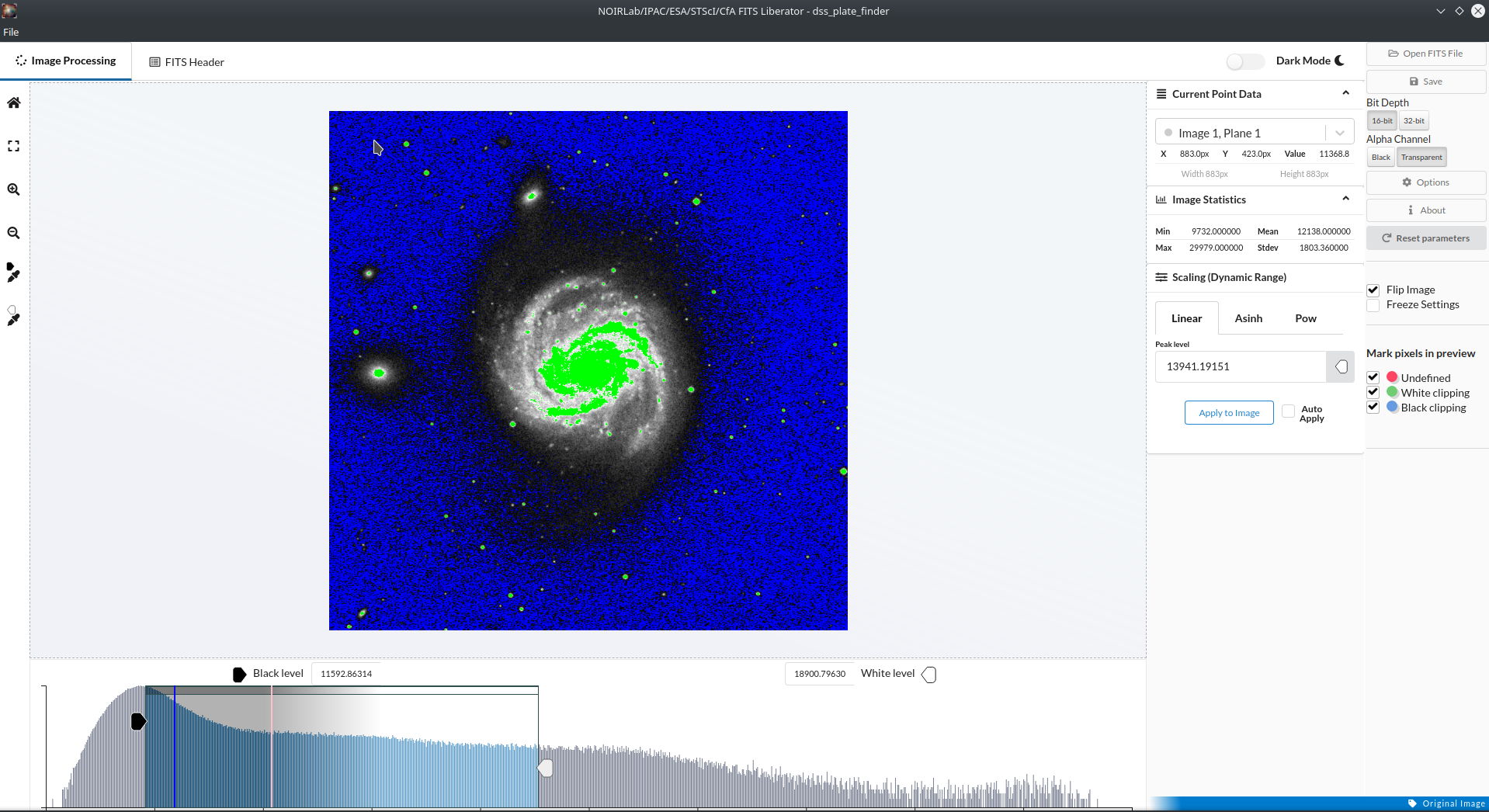
Screenshot FITS Liberator Version 4.0

Version 4.0 of the FITS Liberator was released on 4 March 2021, and includes new features:

- 64 bit operating systems are supported.
- Mac OS X, Windows, and Linux support.
- Command Line Interface for batch processing of FITS files.
- Full support for big images (even greater than available memory).
- Dark mode.
- Full screen mode.

=== Version 5 ===
Version 5.0 of FITS Liberator was released on 26 November 2025.

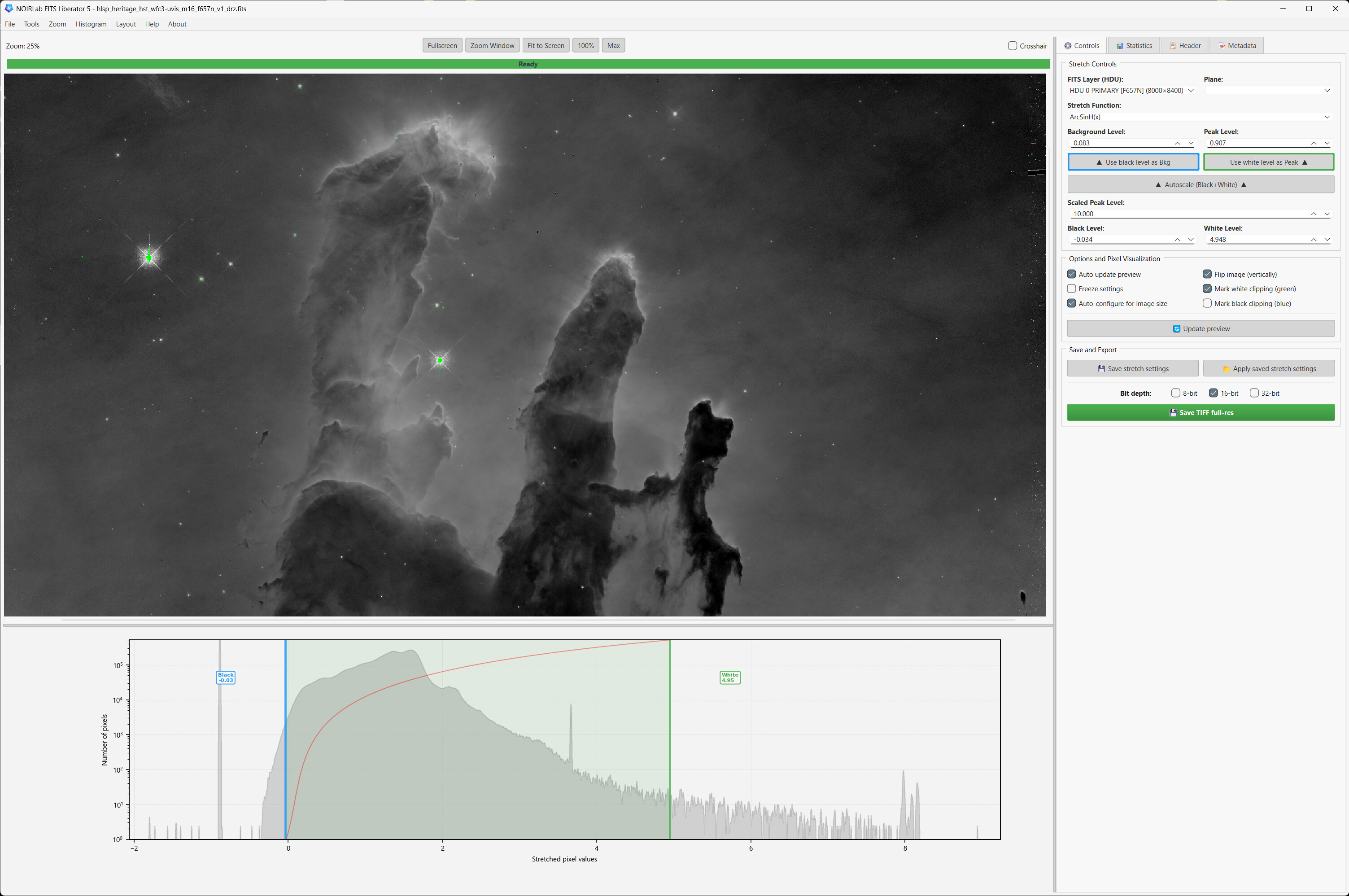
Screenshot FITS Liberator Version 5.0

Developed under the patronage of NSF NOIRLab and authored by Davide De Martin, this version represents a major modernization of the application, featuring a revised architecture, improved performance, and support for contemporary operating systems.

FITS Liberator 5 is optimized to handle very large datasets, including FITS files on the order of 100 GB. It shows new features as a batch processing mode, which allows users to process large collections of FITS files in sequence using consistent processing parameters. FITS Liberator 5 also includes an image editing tool that provides a set of utilities specifically designed for inspecting and manipulating FITS data prior to export.

The software introduces the use of a sidecar file, a lightweight companion file in which the parameters used during image processing are stored. This approach allows processing settings to be preserved, reused, and reapplied to the same or different datasets, improving reproducibility and workflow efficiency.

FITS Liberator 5 is written entirely in Python and is designed with scalability and extensibility in mind. Its modular architecture allows for efficient handling of very large datasets.

== Usage ==
For experienced users, there is a Quick Start Guide available at the FITS Liberator website.

For new users, a Full User Guide for the FITS Liberator 3, can be obtained from the European homepage of the NASA/ESA Hubble Space Telescope.
