= Robert Fosbury =

British astronomer

- Born: 2 April 1948 (age 78); UK
- Scientific career
- Fields: Astronomer
- Workplaces: European Southern Observatory, Germany; UCL, Inst. Ophthalmology

Robert (Bob) Fosbury (born 2 April 1948) is currently an emeritus astronomer at the European Southern Observatory and an honorary professor at the Institute of Ophthalmology at UCL. He is an astronomer who worked for 26 years at the European Space Agency (ESA) as part of ESA's collaboration with NASA on the Hubble Space Telescope (HST) project at ST-ECF. Based at the European Southern Observatory (ESO) near Munich in Germany, Fosbury joined this initiative in 1985, more than 5 years before launch. During the latter part of this period, Bob served on NASA's Ad Hoc Science Working Group and ESA's Study Science Team as they developed the instrument concepts for the James Webb Space Telescope, the next-generation space observatory.

== Early life ==
He started his career at the Royal Greenwich Observatory (RGO) in Herstmonceux, England, in 1969 and was awarded his D.Phil. by the nearby University of Sussex in 1973. He then became one of the first research fellows at the newly constructed Anglo Australian Observatory 4-metre telescope in New South Wales, Australia, before going to ESO while it was based at CERN in Geneva, Switzerland. He then had a spell of 7 years as a staff member at the RGO, working on instruments for the new observatory on La Palma in the Canary Islands and on the pioneering Starlink astronomical computer network.

Fosbury was (2004–2007) chairman of the ESO Astronomy Faculty, the largest group of professional astronomers in Europe (and Chile), and was active in the close liaison between the ESO and ESA science programmes. He has sustained a lifelong interest in the study of natural phenomena of all kinds and is particularly interested in atmospheric optics and the origin of natural colour. Since his retirement and return to England in 2015, he has been awarded an honorary professorship at the UCL Institute of Ophthalmology in London where he works with visual neuroscientists on human and animal vision. His interdisciplinary interests let to the award of a Fellowship at the Institute of Advanced Study at the University of Durham in 2013.

== Contributions ==
Fosbury has published over three hundred scientific papers on topics ranging from exoplanets, the outer atmospheres of stars, the nature of quasars and active galaxies to the physics of forming galaxies in the most distant reaches of the Universe.
