= Association (astronomy) =

Concept of Astronomy

An association (astronomy) is a combined or co-added group of astronomical exposures from which cosmic rays have been removed. WFPC2 associations constitute one type of association and are tools in the Hubble Space Telescope (HST) archive for using data from the Wide Field and Planetary Camera 2 (WFPC2). Associations were introduced in the HST archive at the beginning of 1998. Since then, astronomers have been able to retrieve on-the-fly re-calibrated co-added WFPC2 images that have already been cleaned of cosmic rays from the Space Telescope European Coordinating Facility (ST-ECF), the Canadian Astronomy Data Centre (CADC) and Space Telescope Science Institute (STScI) archives.

== History ==
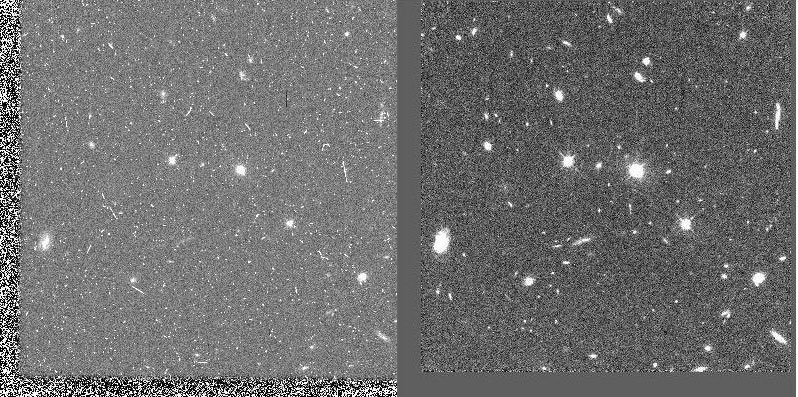
Association example from The Chandra Deep Field South. Left: single exposure; right: Association

The development of a new association pipeline was started in early 1999. Standard cross-correlation techniques were used to measure the offsets among WFPC2 observations belonging to the same proposal and using the same filter. CADC and ST-ECF released the second generation of WFPC2 Associations, known as type B associations in November 2001.

Type B associations contain all the exposures that follow the same criterion of association as type A, but do not depend on the availability or the accuracy of the jitter information.

== See also ==
- Stellar kinematics
