= Lars Lindberg Christensen =

Danish astronomer

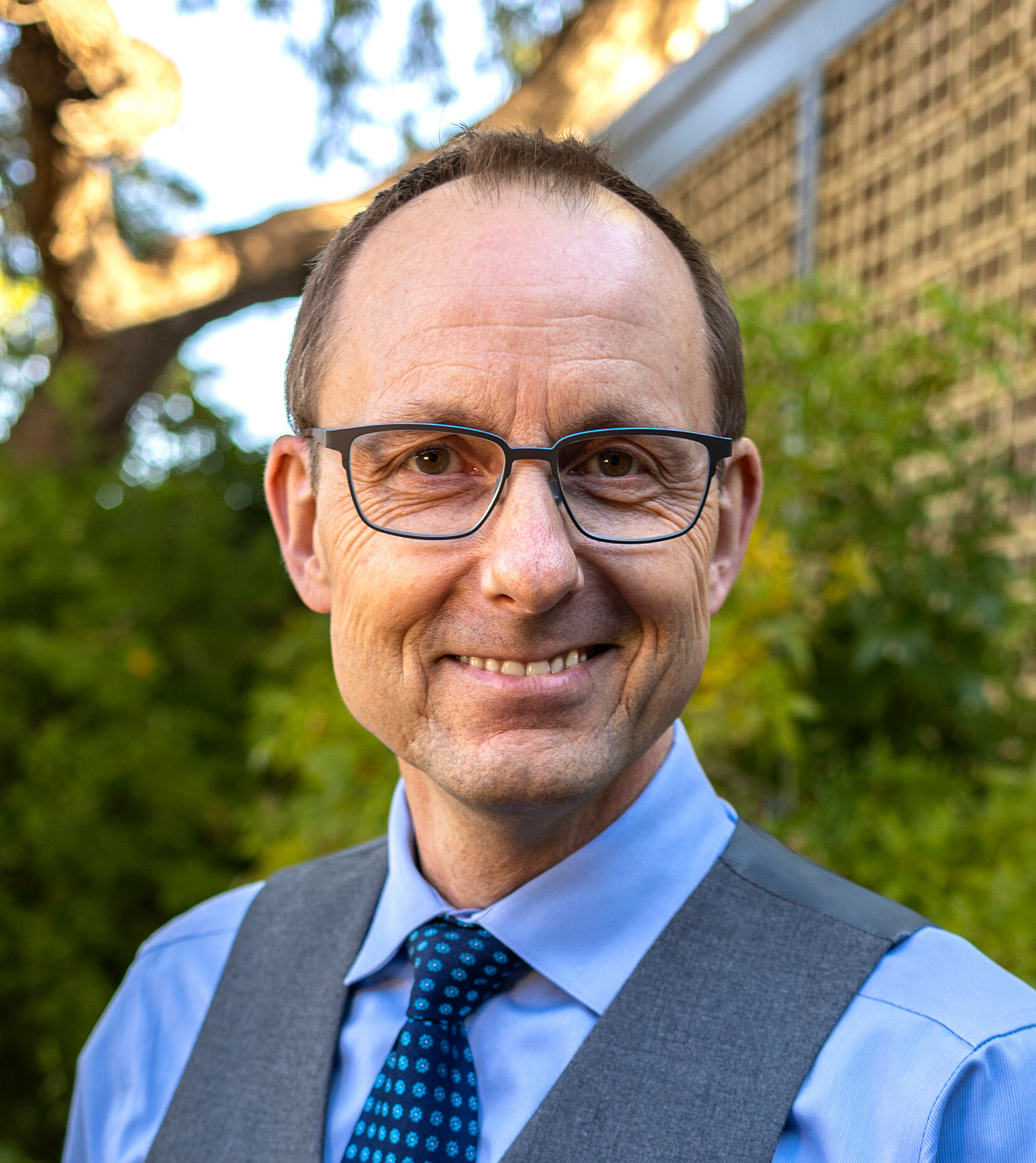
- Lars Lindberg Christensen in 2021
- Born: 18 October 1970 (age 55); Copenhagen, Denmark
- Education: University of Copenhagen
- Occupations: Astronomer; Science communicator; Author
- Employers: European Southern Observatory; NOIRLab; International Astronomical Union
- Awards: Klumpke-Roberts Award (2021)

Lars Lindberg Christensen (born 18 October 1970) is a science communicator and author of a dozen books on astronomy and science communication translated to ten languages.

He had a long career with the European Southern Observatory (ESO) and is employed by the U.S. National Science Foundation NOIRLab and the International Astronomical Union (IAU). As press officer for the latter he was leading the media communication of the 2006 IAU reclassification of Pluto as a dwarf planet.

He leads the Portal to the Universe project, and was the initiator of the ESA/ESO/NASA FITS Liberator project. He leads the Hubblecast and ESOcast video podcasts and initiated the Astronomy Visualization Metadata project, that later became the Virtual Astronomy Multimedia Project. He has received various awards including the Danish Tycho Brahe Medal, the 2022 International Planetarium Society Technology & Innovation Award, and the Klumpke-Roberts Award of the Astronomical Society of the Pacific.

== Bibliography ==
- The Hands-On Guide for Science Communicators (2007)
