= Space Telescope Science Data Analysis System =

Astronomical software

The Space Telescope Science Data Analysis System (STSDAS) is an IRAF-based suite of astronomical software for reducing and analyzing astronomical data. It contains general purpose tools and packages for processing data from the Hubble Space Telescope. STSDAS is produced by Space Telescope Science Institute (STScI). The STSDAS software is generally in the public domain, however some routines were taken from the Numerical Recipes and other books and cannot freely distributed.

In 2018, STScI stopped support of IRAF and STSDAS and suggested migrating to Astropy. For the support of the Gemini IRAF legacy pipeline, selected tasks of STSDAS are still maintained by NOIRLab in the st4gem package.

== See also ==
- Space flight simulation game
  - List of space flight simulation games
- Planetarium software
- List of observatory software
