= On-The-Fly Calibration =

In observational astronomy an On-The-Fly Calibration (OTFC) system calibrates data when a user's request for the data is processed so that users can obtain data that are calibrated with up-to-date calibration files, parameters, and software.

== History of OTFC ==
The OTFC processing system was developed at the Canadian Astronomy Data Centre (CADC) and the Space Telescope European Coordinating Facility (ST-ECF) and is implemented at both sites and at Space Telescope Science Institute (STScI). The OTFC system currently provides data calibration for the Wide Field and Planetary Camera 2 (WFPC2) and Space Telescope Imaging Spectrograph (STIS). In the future, the Advanced Camera for Surveys (ACS) and possibly the Near Infrared Camera and Multi-Object Spectrometer (NICMOS) will be supported.

== Goals of the system ==
The main goals behind the implementation of the OTFC system are to take advantage of better calibration files and the much smaller storage area required if only raw files are kept in the archives.

Currently, for example, HST data are calibrated as they are received at the STScI. Raw and calibrated data are stored in the HST archive (DADS). Frequently, users must recalibrate the data at their home sites to take advantage of better calibration files or software. A large fraction (over 90%) of the calibrated data in the HST archive could be improved by recalibration, although the improvements are not always significant. In the past, instruments that undergo evolution of calibration files or calibration software often required users to carry out their own recalibrations at their home sites. With OTFC, the HST data archives carry out the recalibration.
