= Martin Kornmesser =

German graphic designer

Martin Kornmesser is a graphic designer working at the ESA/NASA Hubble European Space Agency Information Centre (HEIC) in Munich/Garching. He obtained his degree in graphics design in Munich in 1989. Kornmesser has actively pioneered the exploration of the world of computer graphics. In 1990 he was the co-founder of the company ART-M, where he created illustrations, wall-paintings and all kinds of graphics design before joining ESA's Hubble outreach group in 1999.

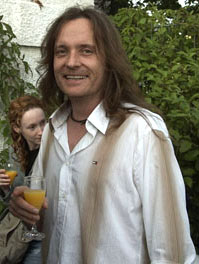
Kornmesser
