= NOIRLab =

American astronomical institution

National Optical-Infrared Astronomy Research Laboratory (NOIRLab)
- NOIRLab logo
- Motto: Discovering Our Universe Together
- Established: 2019
- Field of research: Astronomy
- Director: Beth Willman
- Deputy Director: Stuartt Corder
- Location: Tucson, Arizona, United States
- Sponsoring agency: National Science Foundation
- Operating agency: Association of Universities for Research in Astronomy
- Website: noirlab.edu

The National Optical-Infrared Astronomy Research Laboratory (NOIRLab) is the United States' national facility for ground-based, night-time optical and infrared astronomy. It is funded by the National Science Foundation (NSF) and operated by the Association of Universities for Research in Astronomy (AURA), as a federally funded research and development center.

NOIRLab runs four observatories and a center for scientific software and research data archiving. It provides access to observing time for astronomers affiliated with any US institution.

== History ==
NOIRLab was formed on October 1st, 2019 by the merger of three predecessor organizations, which were all managed by AURA and funded by NSF. They were:

- The National Optical Astronomy Observatory (NOAO), which managed Kitt Peak Observatory in Arizona, Cerro Tololo Observatory in Chile, and the Community Science and Data Center
- The Gemini Observatory, which operated Gemini North in Hawaii and Gemini South in Chile
- The Vera C. Rubin Observatory, which was constructing the Large Synoptic Survey Telescope in Chile

From its beginning to October 2026, Dr. Patrick McCarthy was the director of NOIRLab. Dr. Beth Willman took over as interim director on October 5th, 2026.

In 2026, NOIRLab received $109 million from the NSF.

== Organization ==
AURA operates the NOIRLab and its facilities under a cooperative agreement with the National Science Foundation (NSF).

== Facilities ==
NOIRLab operates the following facilities:

NOIRLab's current and future telescopes.

- Cerro Tololo Inter-American Observatory
- International Gemini Observatory
- NSF Kitt Peak National Observatory
- NSF–DOE Vera C. Rubin Observatory

NOIRLab additionally provides software and user services for these facilities through the Community Science & Data Center.

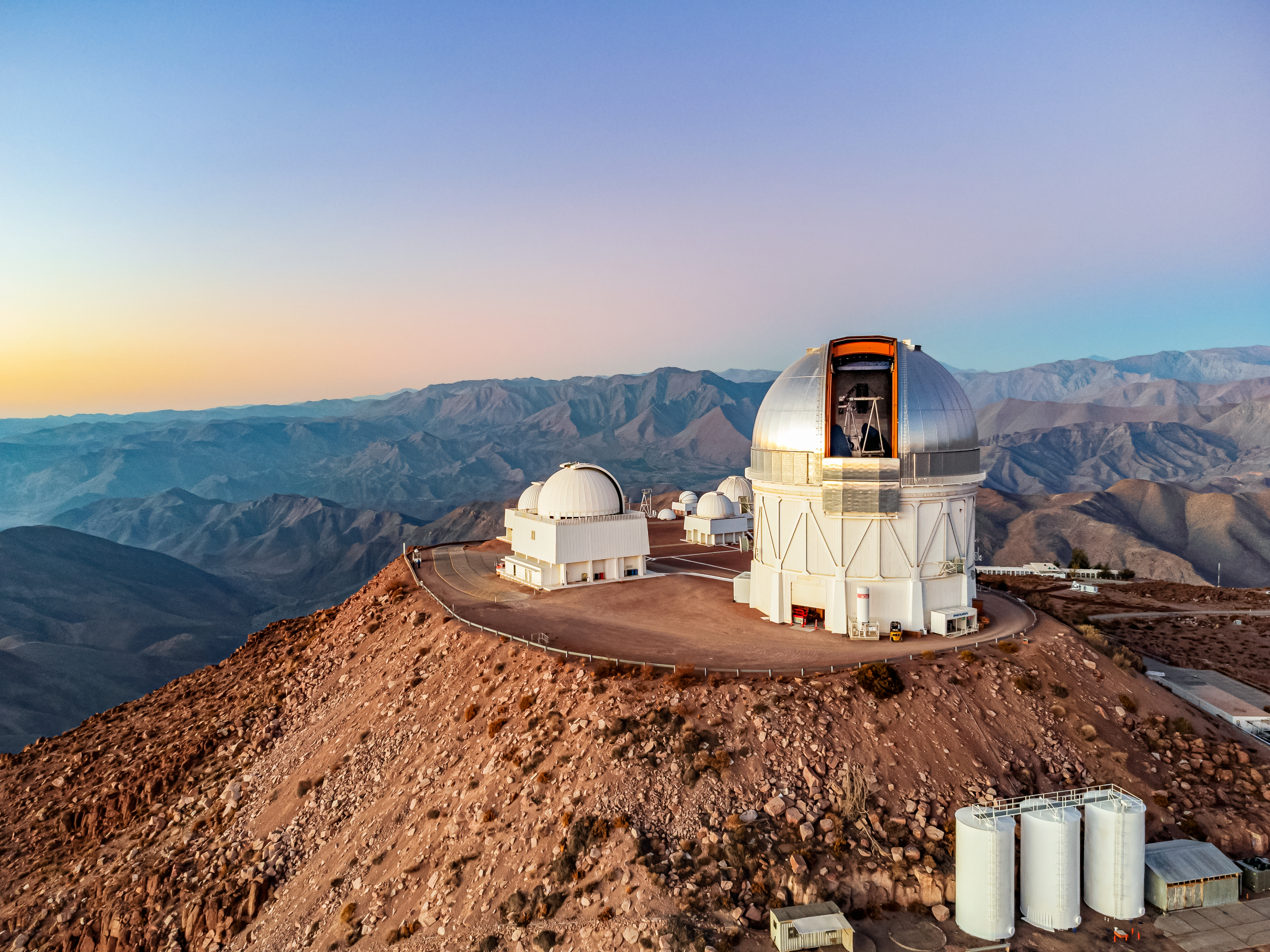
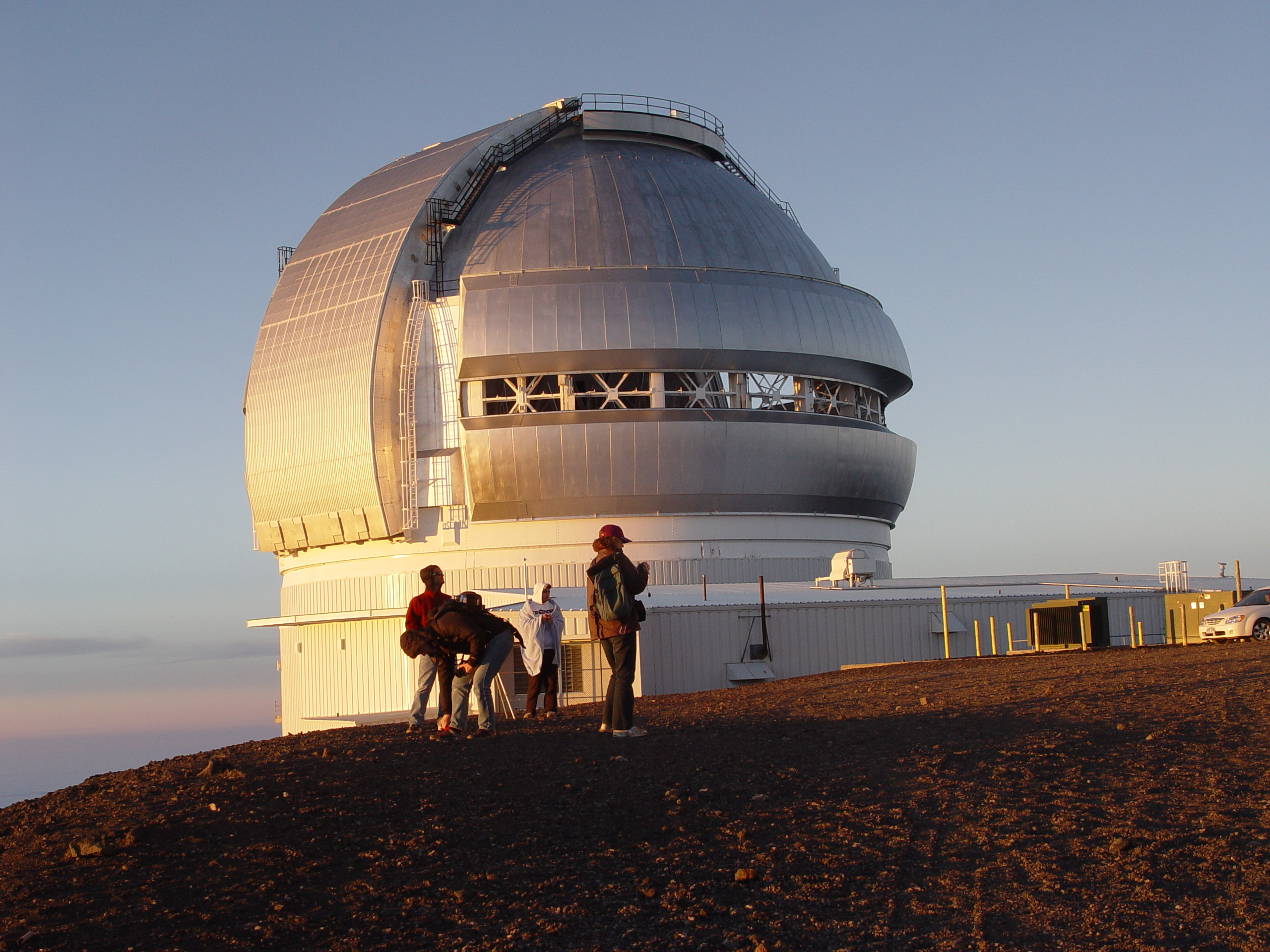
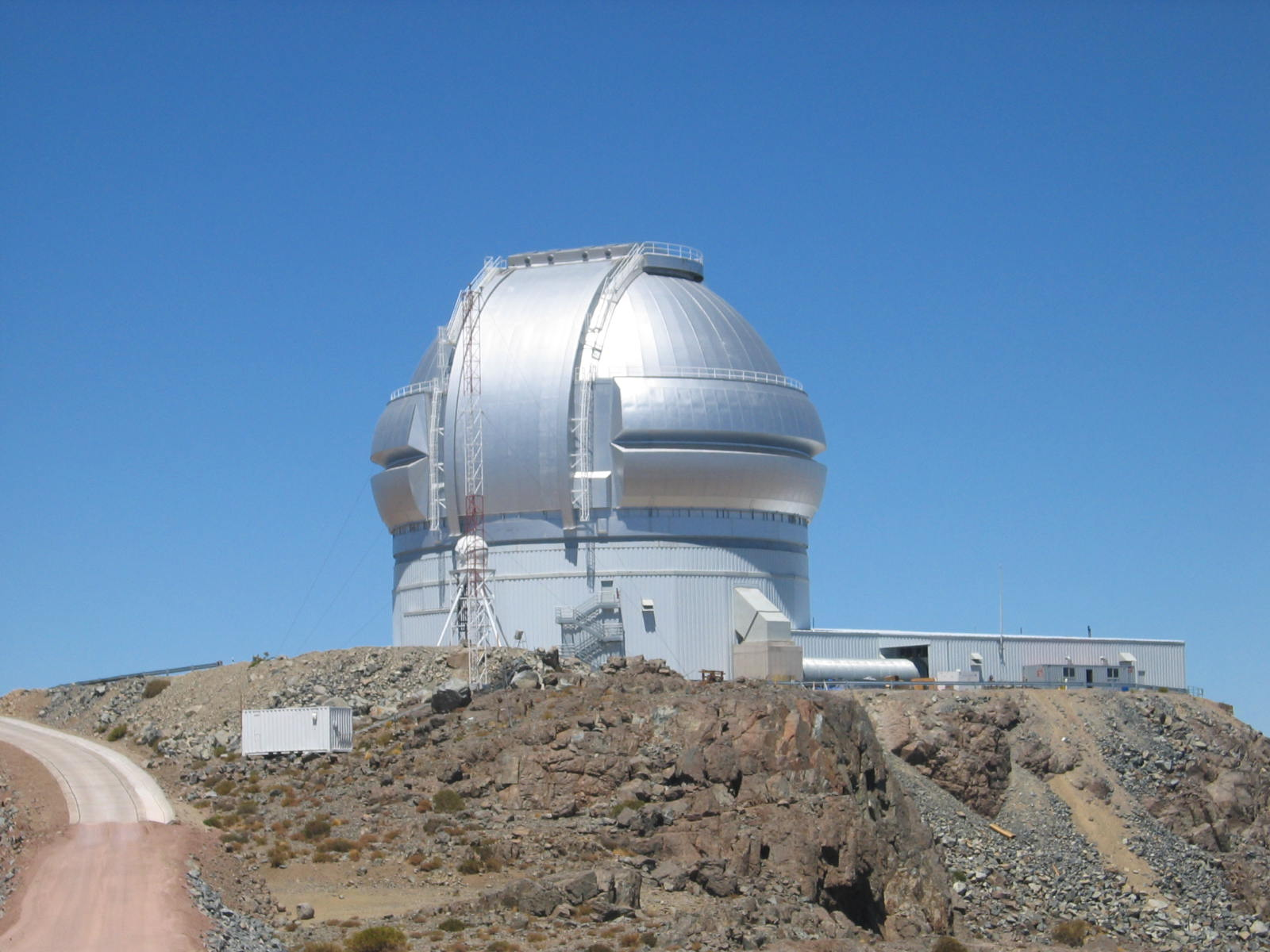
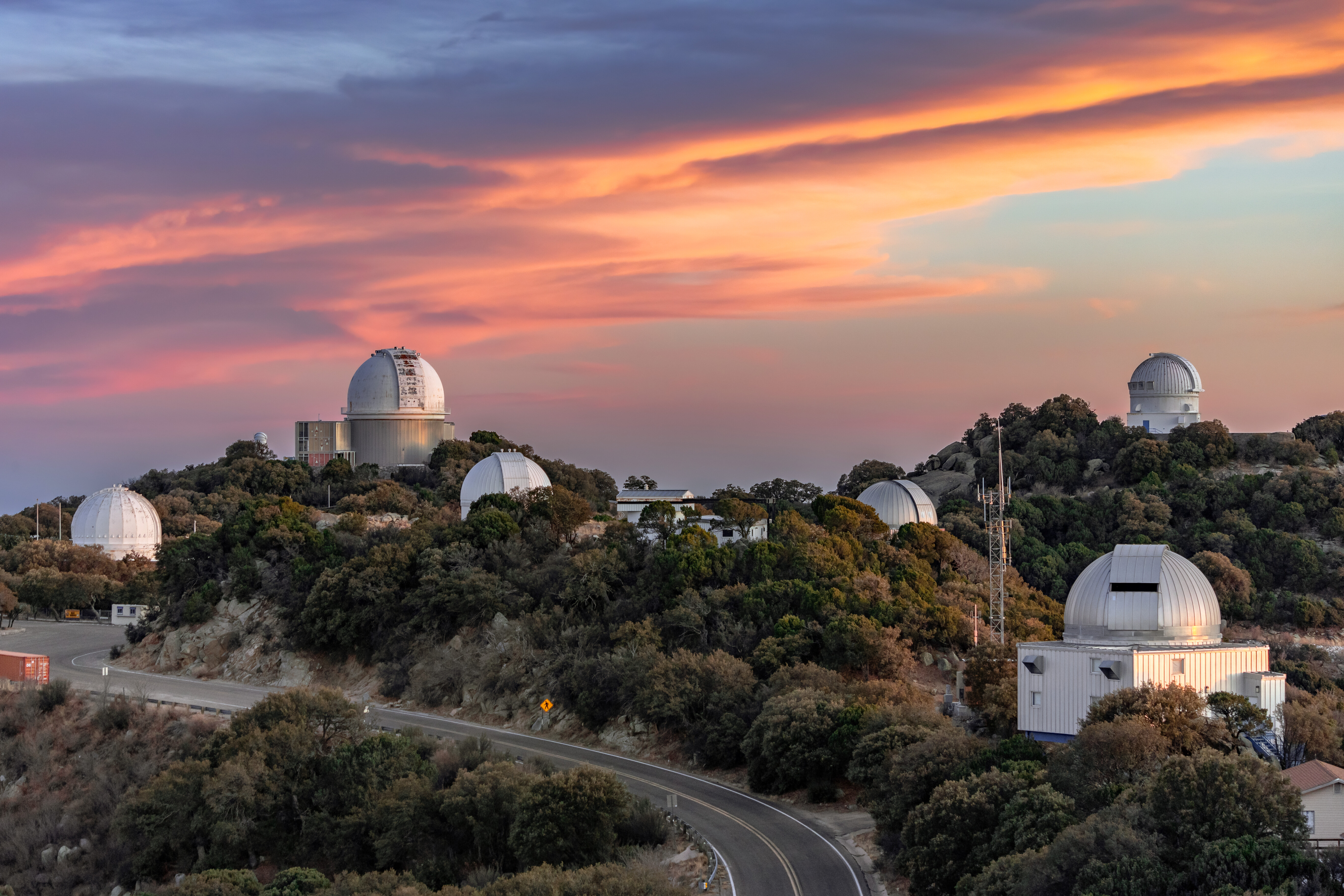
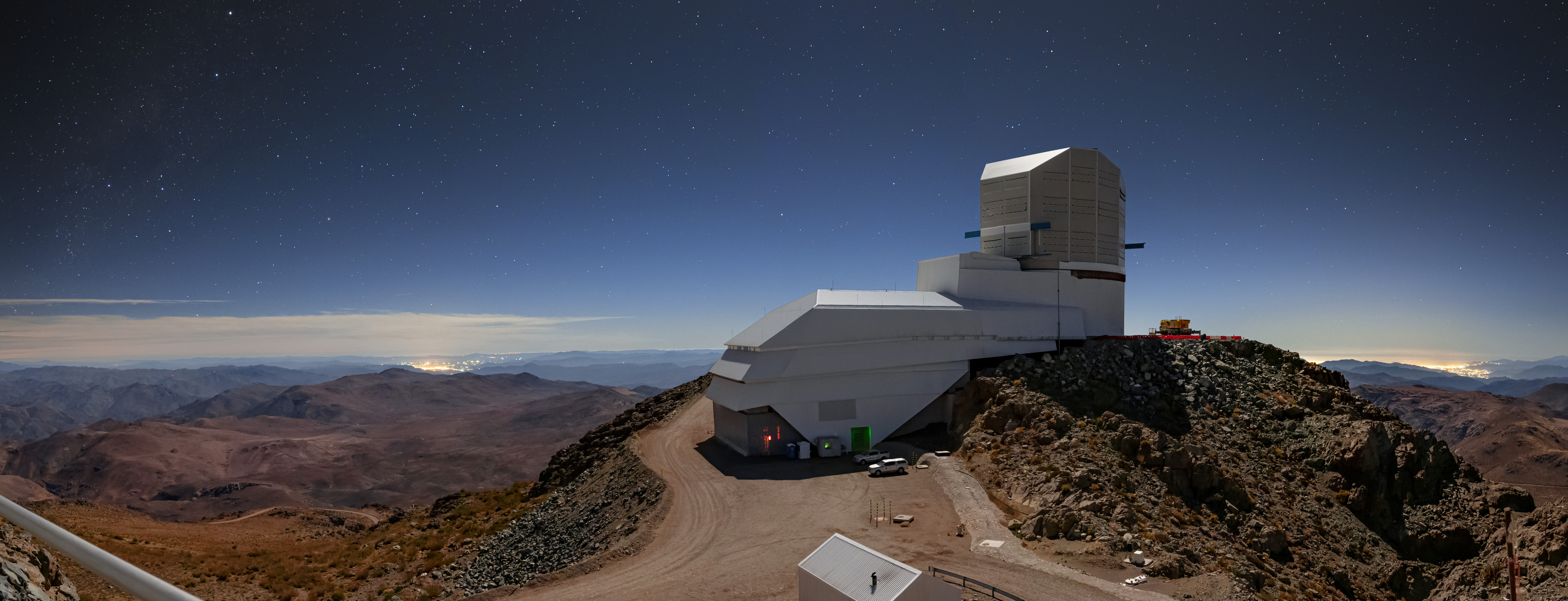
Image of the NOIRLab Facilities

== Gallery ==
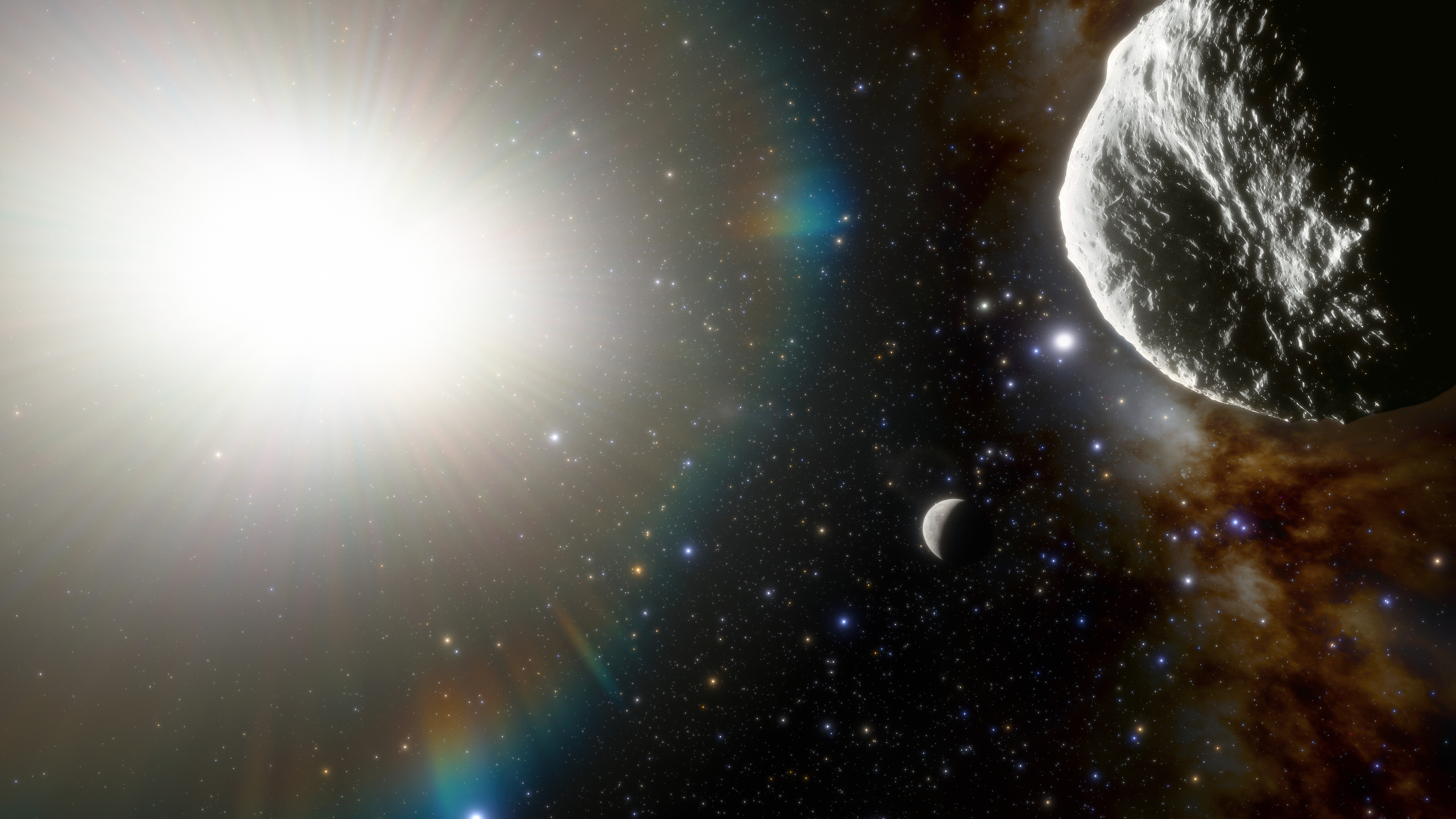
2021 PH_{27}

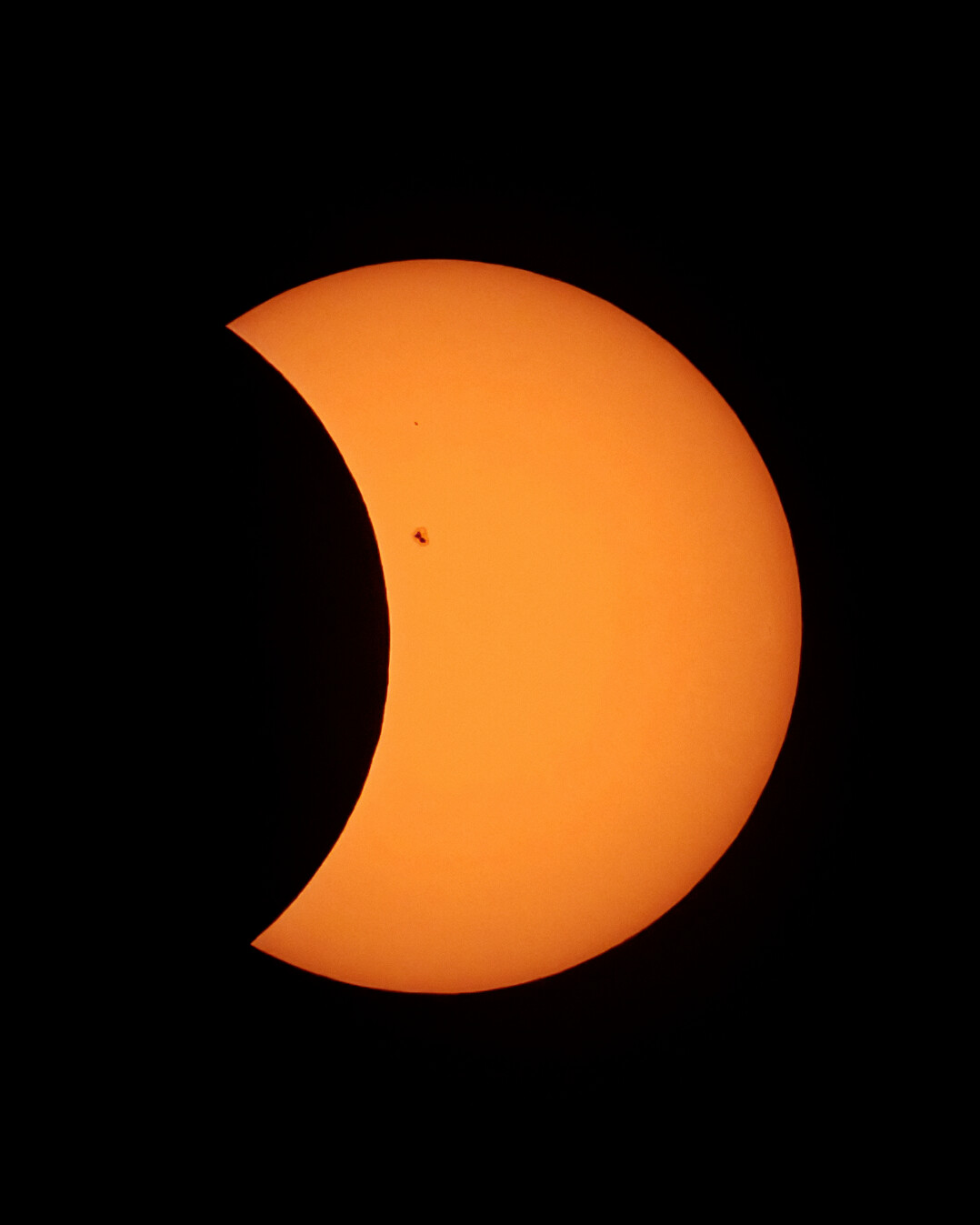
2024 Solar Eclipse

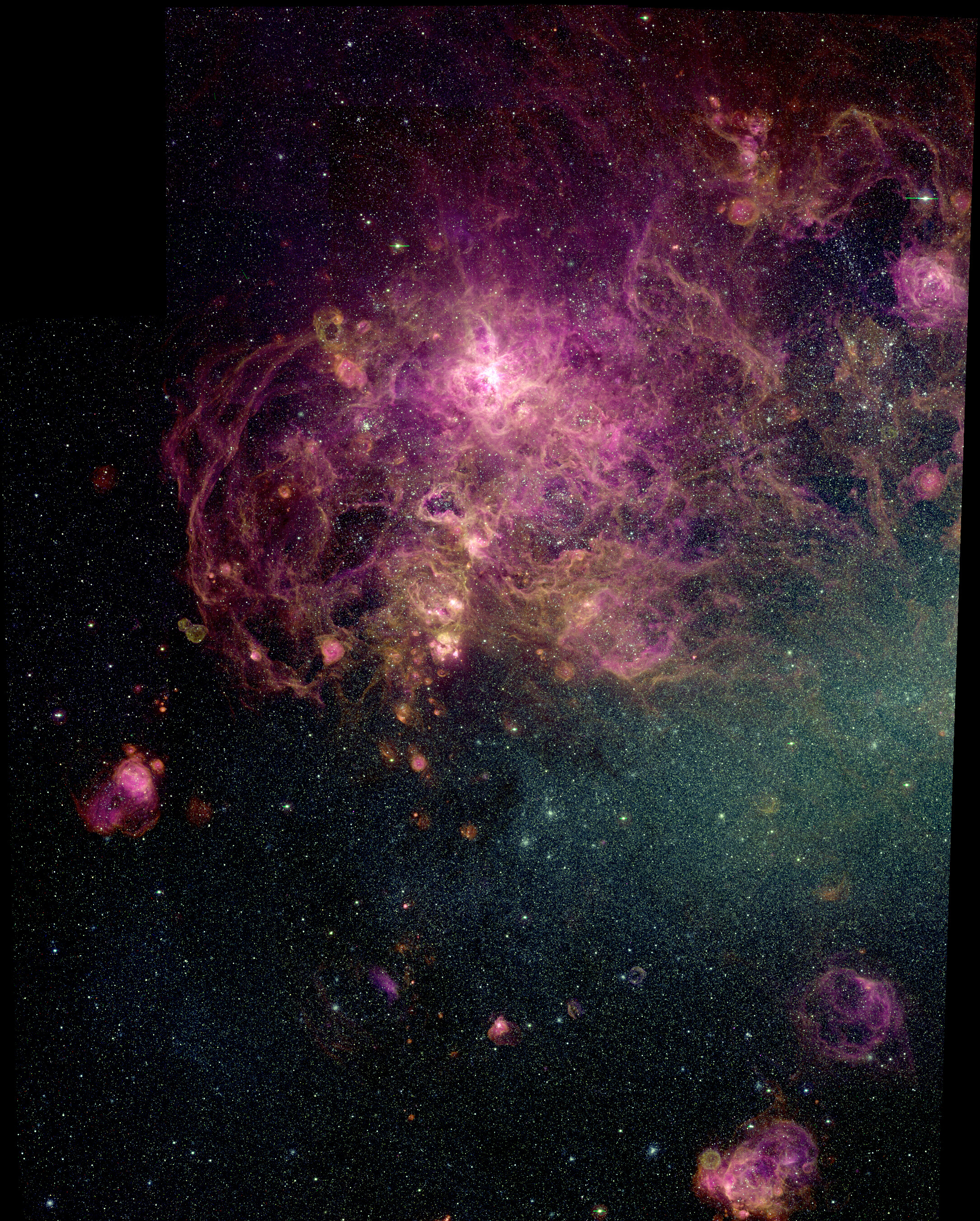
Tarantula Nebula

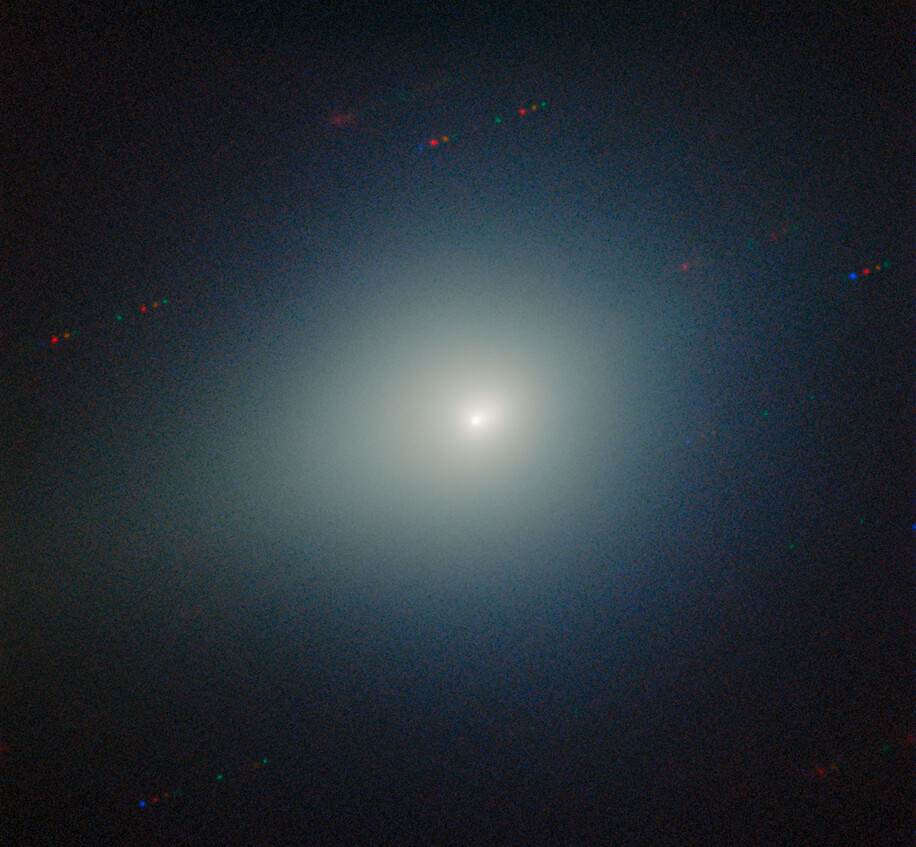
3I ATLAS

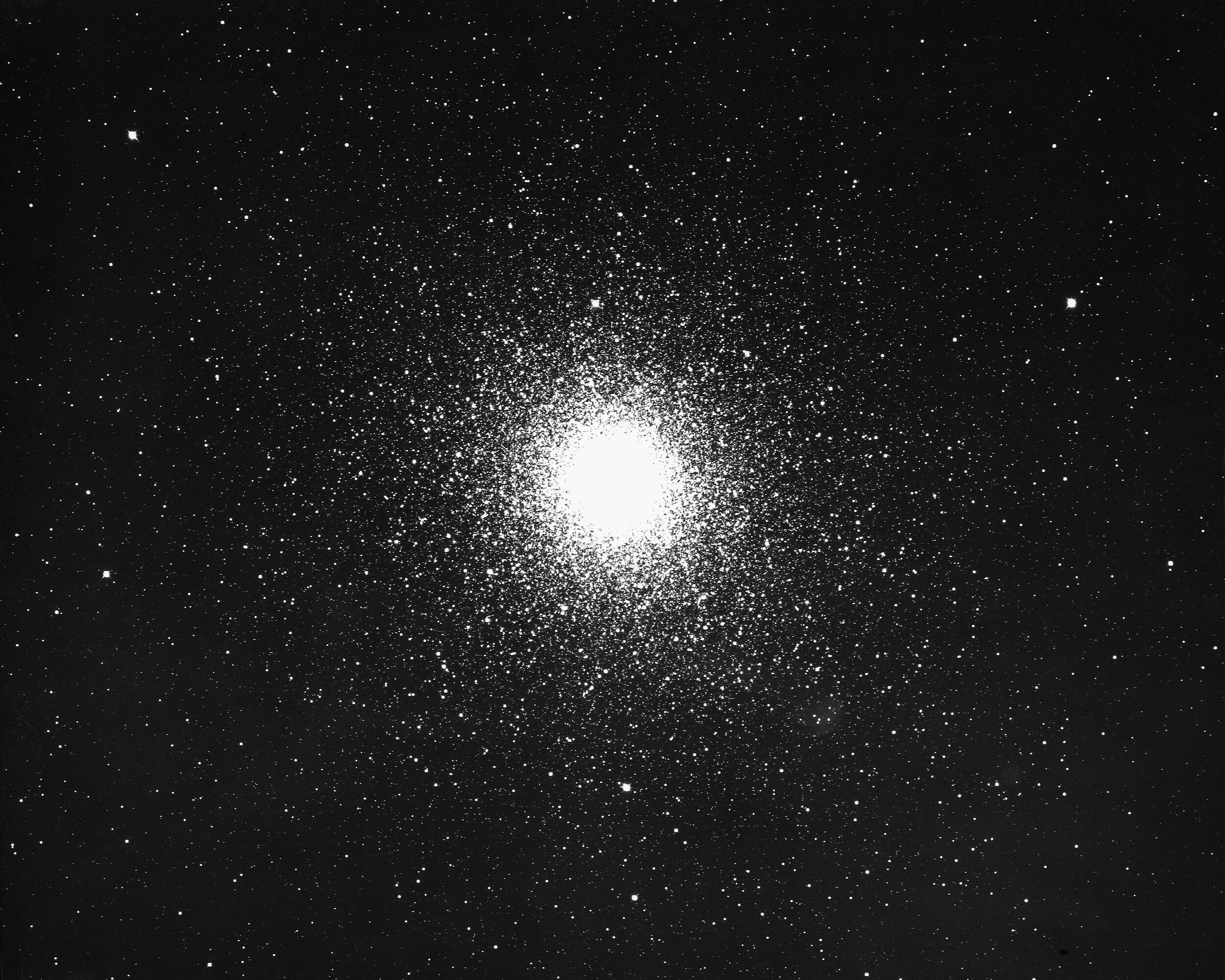
47 Tucanae

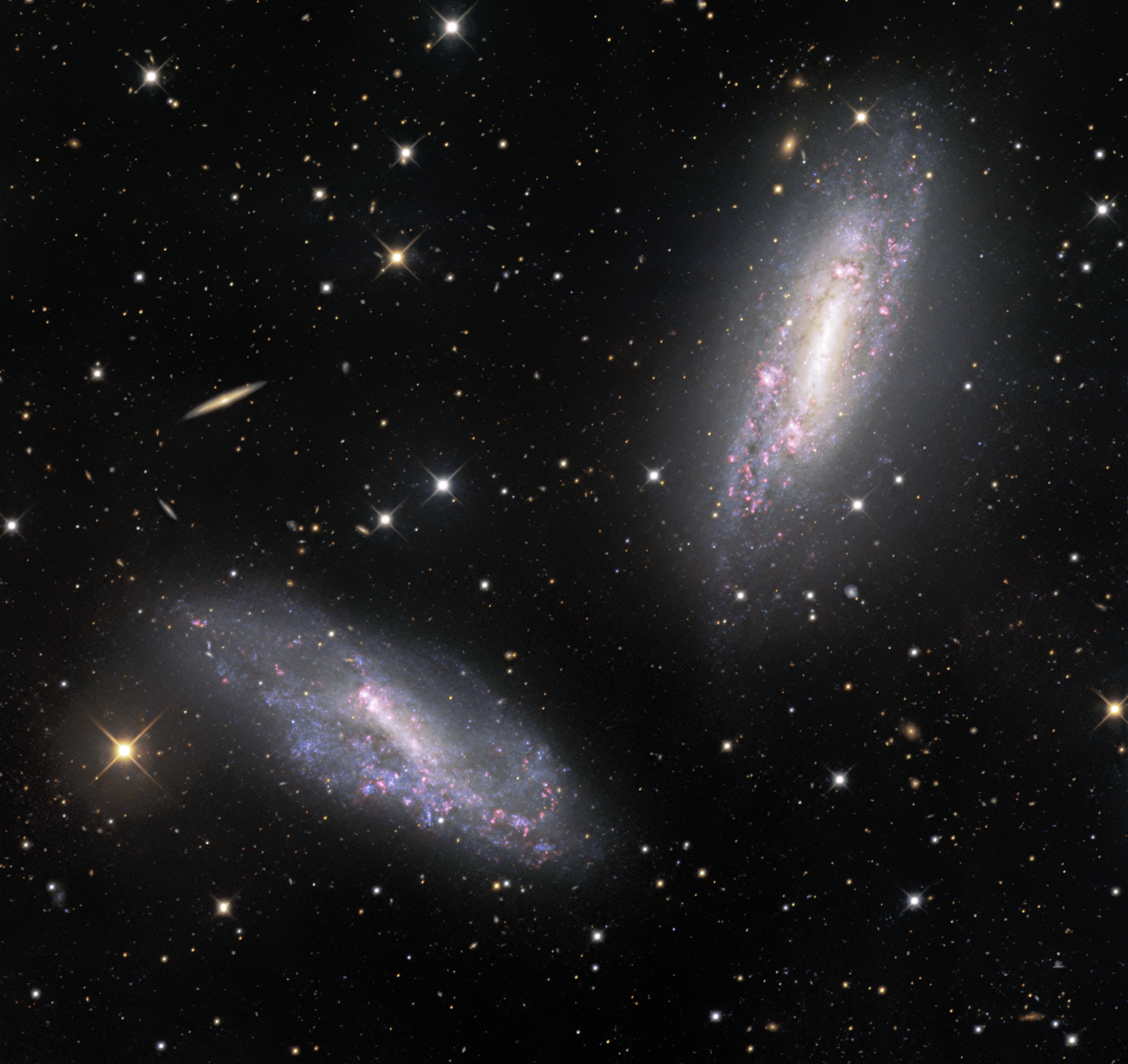
NGC 672 & IC 1727

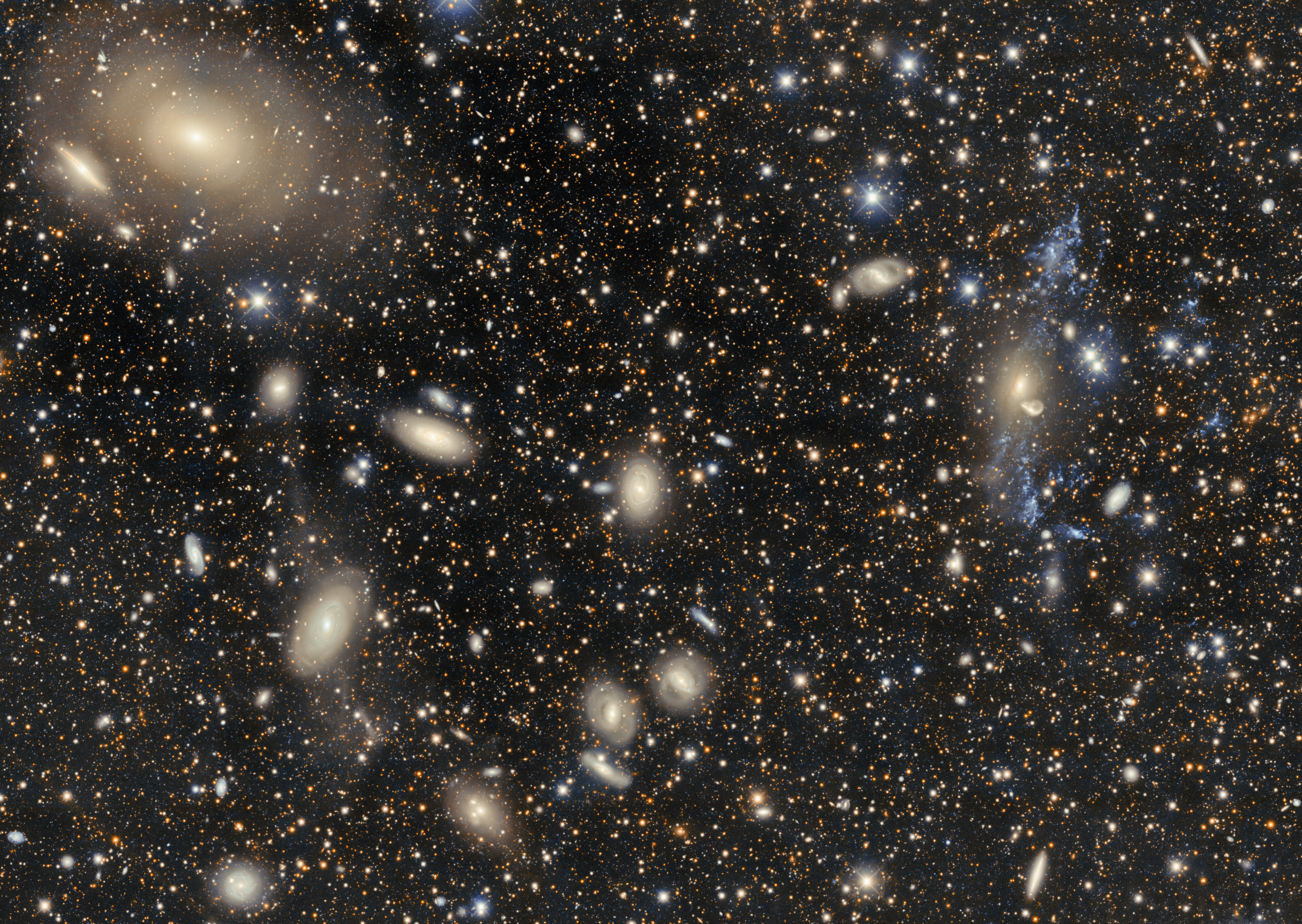
Abell 3574

NGC 1515

Sh 2-3

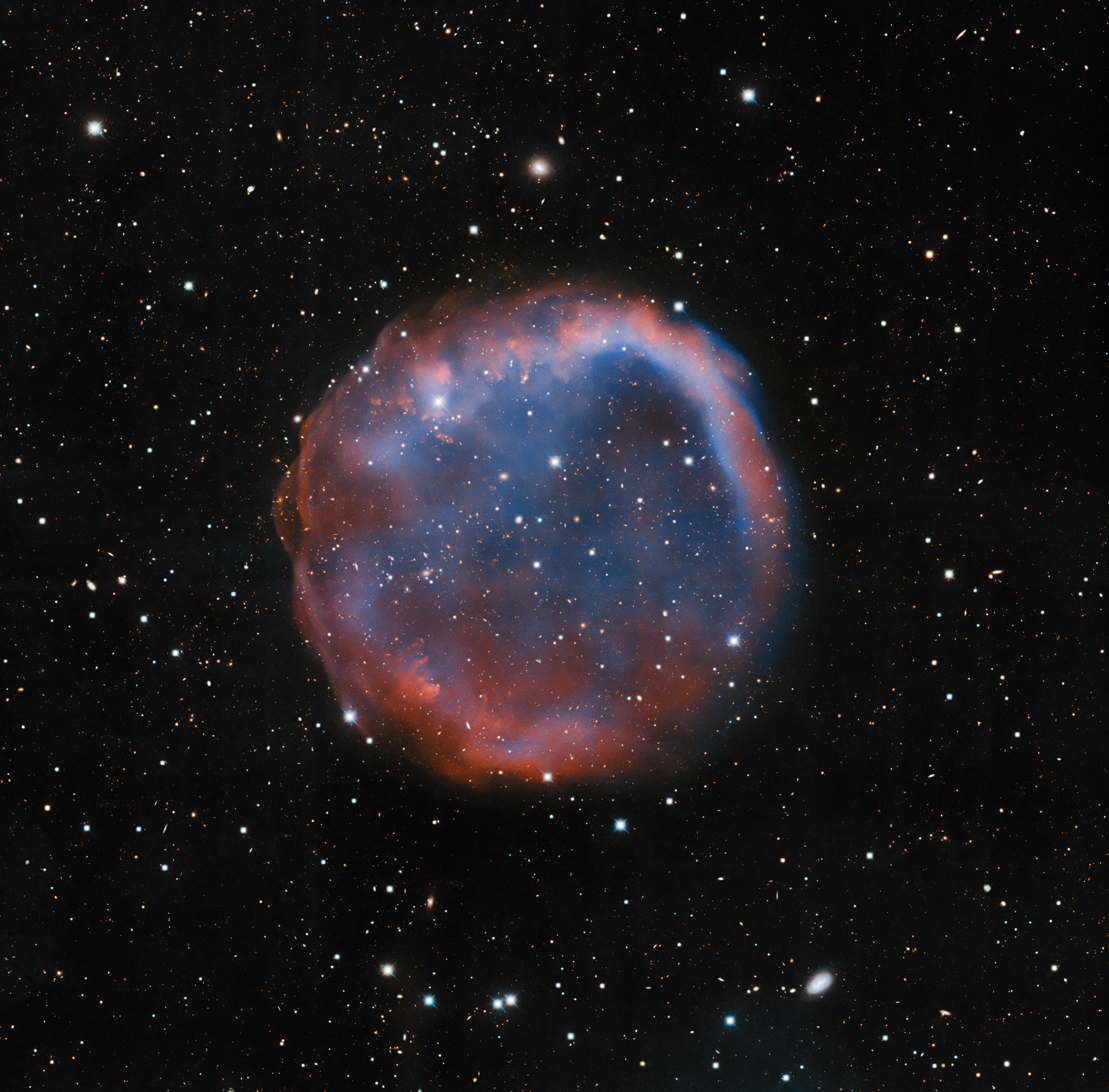
EGB 6

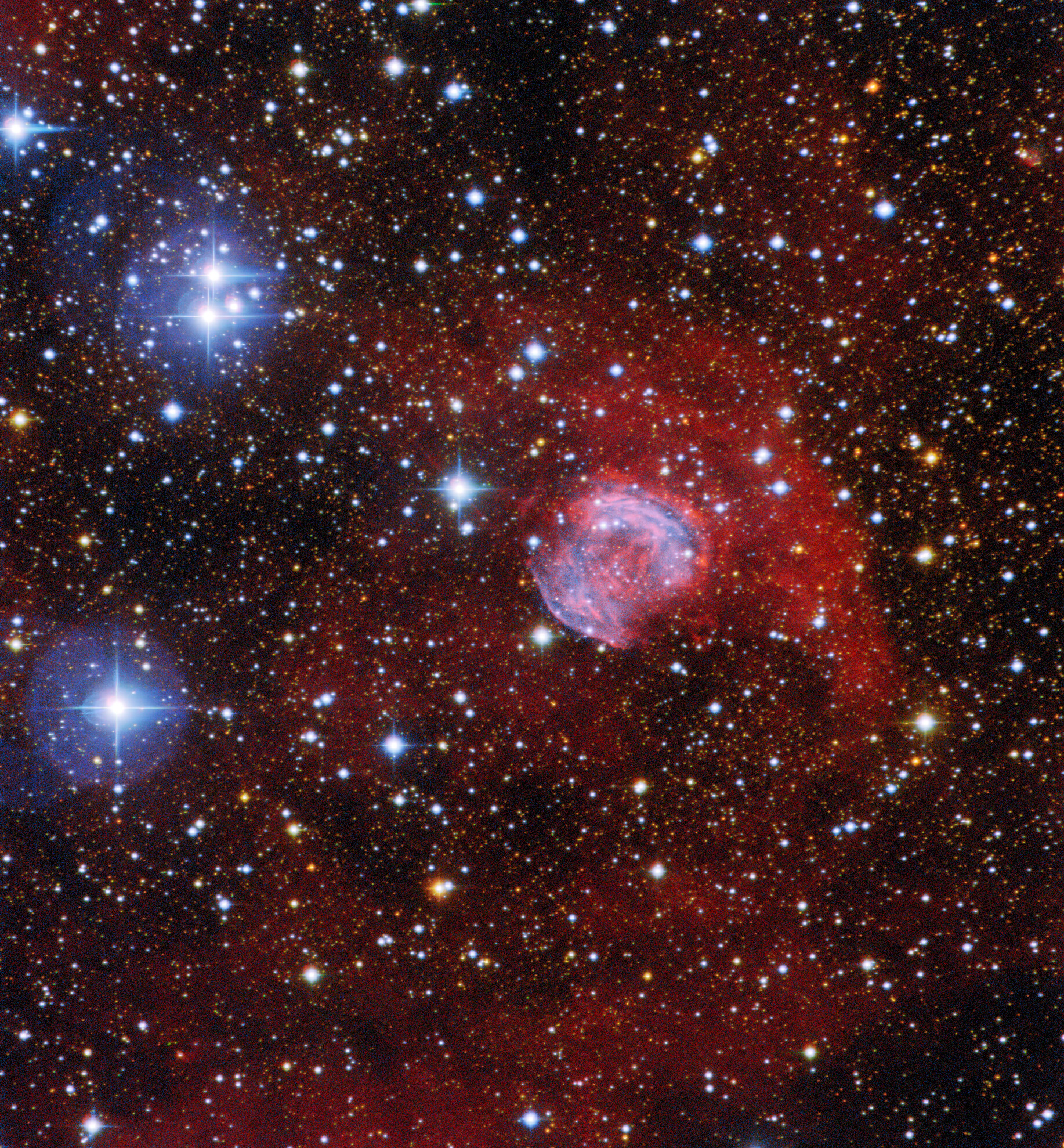
Sh 2-42

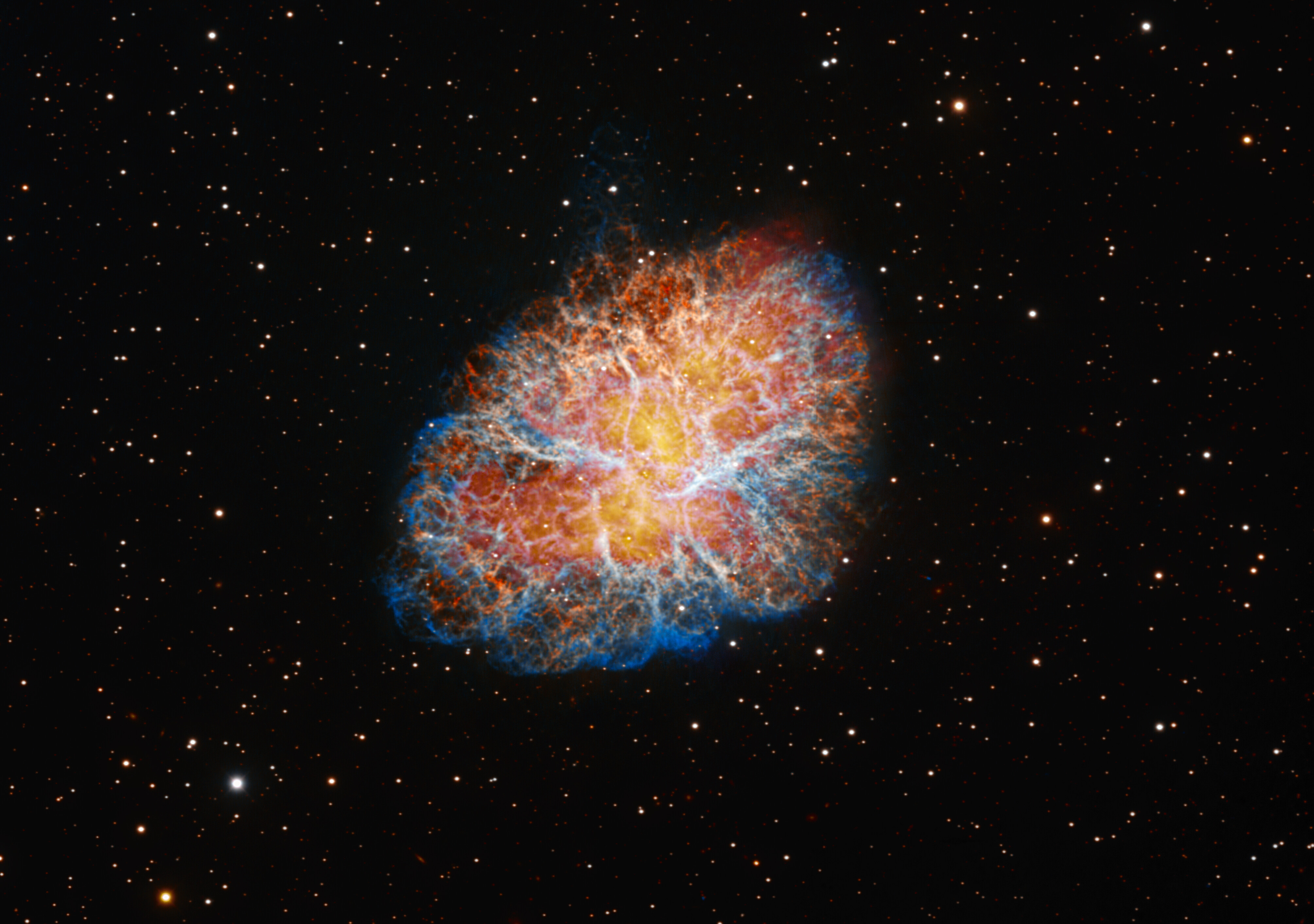
Crab Nebula
