= XEphem =

- Screenshot of the XEphem 3.7.2 with the Earth and sky views
- Developer: Elwood C. Downey
- Release: 1990; 36 years ago
- Stable release: 4.3.0 / March 6, 2026; 6 months ago
- Written in: C and Motif
- Operating system: Unix-like
- Type: Planetarium software
- License: MIT License
- Website: github.com/XEphem/XEphem
- Repository: github.com/XEphem/XEphem

XEphem is a Motif based ephemeris and planetarium program for Unix-like operating systems developed by Elwood C. Downey.

== History ==
XEphem started as a Unix and Motif conversion of the IBM PC-based ephem. It was initially released in December 1993 with version 2.5. Its commercial edition was discontinued in 2016; the free version continued to be offered as proprietary software. In 2021, however, Downey relicensed XEphem's source code under the MIT License, raising the release version from 3.7.7 to 4.0.0 to highlight the change.

== Algorithms and models ==
XEphem uses

- The VSOP87D planetary theory (full and reduced precision) for Solar System ephemeris,
- Approximation to DE200 for the outer planets and Pluto, and
- Formulae from J. Meeus (1982) for Jovian and Saturnian natural satellites
- Model by the Bureau des Longitudes for Martian and Uranian natural satellites

and includes

- About 452 million stars from both the Tycho-2 Catalogue and a magnitude limited subset of the Guide Star Catalog II,
- About 1 million deep sky objects mainly from a subset of HYPERLEDA,
- About 288,000 minor planets and comets orbital elements from the IAU Minor Planet Center and Lowell Observatory (that can be updated),

and other specialized catalogs. It also include the Digital Lunar Orbiter Photographic Atlas of the Moon. XEphem is a client for Internet data sources such as the Digitized Sky Survey, Solar and Heliospheric Observatory, AAVSO light curves, and global temperature and cloud coverage. Through the Instrument Neutral Distributed Interface, XEphem can control some models of amateur telescopes, such as by Meade, Celestron, and Vixen, and auxiliary telescope components.

== Catalogs ==
While the free version of XEphem only includes a subset of the SKYMAP Master Catalog and the Messier Catalog, the internal format of the remaining catalogs can be inferred from the source code, and e.g. the internal binary Tycho-2 catalog can be generated from the original data. This is also possible for the non-stellar catalogs in the ASCII .edb format, such as for HYPERLEDA.

XEphem can also read several astrometric catalogs in their original formats:

- GSC 1.2 and GSC-ACT
- USNO A/SA 1.0/2.0
- UCAC2

Numerical routines are used in PyEphem with permission of Elwood Downey.

== See also ==
- Cartes du Ciel – Free desktop planetarium
- Celestia – Astronomy computer program
- Digital Universe Atlas – Planetarium application
- Google Earth – 3D Internet global map program
- HNSKY – Night sky simulator software
- KStars – Graphical desktop planetarium
- NASA WorldWind – Open-source virtual globe
- Stellarium – Open-source planetarium
- Universe Sandbox – Video game series
- WorldWide Telescope – Set of open-source services
