= Distro Astro =

Astronomy themed Linux distribution

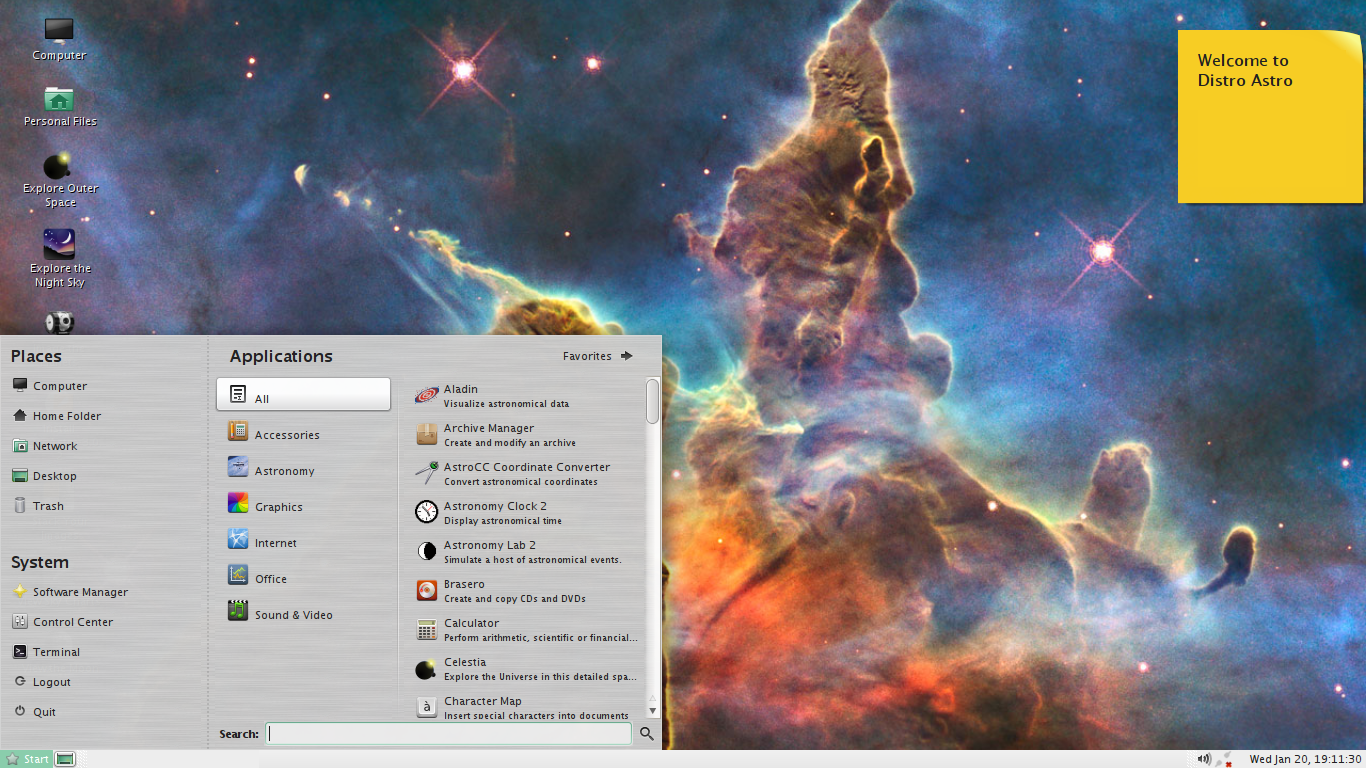
- Distro Astro 3.0.2
- OS family: Linux
- Working state: Discontinued
- Source model: Open Source
- Initial release: January 1, 2013; 12 years ago
- Kernel type: Linux kernel
- Default user interface: MATE
- Official website: distroastro.org

Distro Astro is a discontinued Linux based operating system targeted towards astronomers and astronomy enthusiasts. The project was started by Bamm Gabriana with contributions from other astronomy enthusiasts.

== Features ==
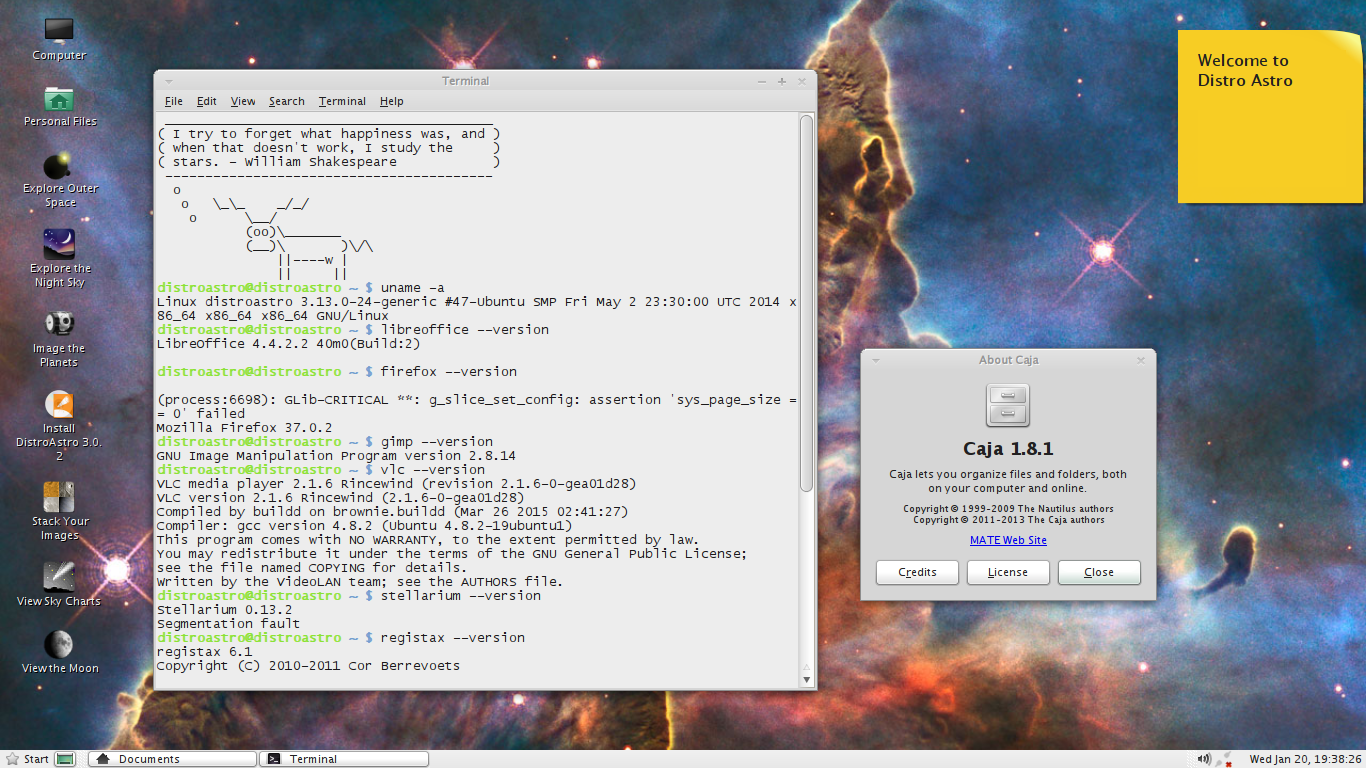
Software

Distro Astro is based upon the MATE desktop, bearing resemblance to the user interface of Windows based operating systems. It is bundled with some mainstream desktop such as Mozilla Firefox and LibreOffice, as well as astronomy related software including Cartes du Ciel and KStars.

== History ==
Installing Distro Astro

The first version of Distro Astro was released on 1 January 2013. The OS had two minor updates in April and August, primarily addressing software upgrades and tweaks.

In November 2013, the OS had its first major upgrade as Distro Astro 2.0, nicknamed Pallas. It included new features such as dual-boot support and touch screen capability, as well as new software bundled.

Distro Astro 3.0 was released a year later in November 2014.

Release history
Version	Codename	Kernel	Release date
3.0.2		3.13.0-24	2015
3.0	Juno		November 9, 2014
2.0	Pallas	3.8.0-33	November 20, 2013
1.0.2	Ceres	3.2.0-49	August 9, 2013
1.0.1		3.2.0-40	April 25, 2013
1.0		3.2.0-35	January 1, 2013

== See also ==
- Fedora Astronomy KDE
