= Skyglobe =

Skyglobe 3.6 (DOS)
- Skyglobe 3.6 (DOS) screenshot.
- Developer(s): Mark A. Haney
- Operating system: MS-DOS
- Type: Planetarium
- License: Shareware

Skyglobe is an astronomy program for MS-DOS and Microsoft Windows first developed in the late 1980s and early 1990s and sold as Shareware. It plots the positions of stars, Messier objects, planets, Sun and Moon.

Skyglobe was designed by Mark A. Haney and his company KlassM Software Inc. in Ann Arbor, Michigan, and first released in 1989, after Mark graduated in computer science from Michigan State University. Use of Skyglobe is still suggested to students at Villanova University.

Skyglobe for Windows
- Skyglobe for Windows screenshot.
- Developer(s): Mark A. Haney
- Operating system: Microsoft Windows
- Type: Planetarium
- License: Freeware

Registered users of the MS-DOS version received additional software, such as a Skyglobe screensaver, and Crystal Sphere, an application simulating the 3,800 stars nearest the Solar System. Crystal Sphere may have been the progenitor of CircumSpace, KlassM Software's subsequent stellar neighborhood simulator, displaying the nearest 7,780 stars.

At least two versions of Skyglobe were later released for Microsoft Windows, being variously listed as versions 1.0, 2.0, 2.02 and 4.0, as well as other possible iterations between. Skyglobe for Windows (also known as SG4WIN) is freely available online.

== Accuracy ==
Skyglobe accounts for the Earth's precession in its calculations and should therefore be accurate to tens of thousands of years in the past and the future, but its manual does warn that the positions of planets might not be accurate throughout this range (it says "their coordinates are approximately correct for as far back and forward as we have data").

Skyglobe's dates use the Julian calendar until October 4, 1582, and the Gregorian calendar thereafter. It does not have a zero year.

== User interface ==
Commands in the DOS version of Skyglobe are mostly keystroke-based, and by default the available keys are listed on the screen for reference. Keys exist to adjust the viewer's location, viewing direction, and time (all of which are shown on the display by default), and to control how many objects are rendered. There is also a zoom control, and a function to search for particular objects. If the object being searched for is not currently above the horizon but will be in the next 24 hours, Skyglobe will adjust the time appropriately.

A mouse can be used to change the viewing direction or to point at objects; the object under the mouse will be named in the lower-left corner of the screen, along with its horizontal and equatorial coordinates. Clicking with the mouse will re-center the display at that point, and right-clicking will "lock" that position or object to the display's center so you can more easily follow it over time changes. (It is also possible to lock objects using keyboard commands.)

Skyglobe can be made to animate the changes of any of its parameters with its "turbo" function, most commonly used to speed up time. The turbo function can animate the changes of centuries or millennia to demonstrate precession.

== See also ==
- Space flight simulation game
  - List of space flight simulation games
- Planetarium software
- List of observatory software
