= Digital Universe Atlas =

Planetarium application

- Original authors: Brian Abbott, Carter Emmart, Steven Marx, Ryan Wyatt
- Developers: American Museum of Natural History's Hayden Planetarium, National Aeronautics and Space Administration
- Release: 2002
- Operating system: Windows, macOS, Linux, AmigaOS 4, IRIX
- Platform: PC
- Type: Educational software
- License: Illinois Open Source License
- Website: www.haydenplanetarium.org/universe

Digital Universe Atlas is a free open source software planetarium application, available under the terms of the Illinois Open Source License, and running on Linux, Windows, macOS (10.5 and above), AmigaOS 4, and IRIX.

It is a standalone 4-dimensional space visualization application built on the programmable Partiview data visualization engine designed by Stuart Levy of the National Center for Supercomputing Applications (NCSA) as an adjunct of the NCSA's Virtual Director virtual choreography project. The Virtual Universe Atlas project was launched by the American Museum of Natural History's Hayden Planetarium with significant programming support from the National Aeronautics and Space Administration as well as Stuart Levy. The database draws on the National Virtual Observatory.

Along with Celestia and Orbiter, and unlike most other planetarium applications, Digital Universe shares the capacity to visualize space from points outside Earth. Building on work by Japan's RIKEN, its planet renderings and zoom visualizations can match or exceed Celestia and Orbiter. Unlike Celestia and Orbiter, highly accurate visualization from distances beyond the Milky Way galaxy is integral to the software and the datasets. This allows for unrivaled flexibility in plotting itineraries that reveal true distances and configurations of objects in the observable sky. It therefore improves understanding of the surroundings of the Solar System in terms of observer-neutral celestial coordinate systems—systems that are neither geocentric nor heliocentric—such as the galactic coordinate system and supergalactic coordinate system.

The Digital Universe Atlas has spun off a commercial-grade planetarium platform from SCISS called Uniview that was featured in the White House star party on October 7, 2009. The Atlas database and Partiview interface is compatible with professional planetarium software such as Evans & Sutherland's Digistar and Sky-Skan's DigitalSky 2.

The Digital Universe is now a critical component of the OpenSpace open source interactive data visualization software suite. In 2014, a NASA grant (supported by the NASA Science Mission Directorate in response to NASA Cooperative Agreement Number (CAN) NNH15ZDA004C, Amendment 1) was awarded to the American Museum of Natural History for the development of the OpenSpace project, to utilize the latest data visualization techniques and graphics card technologies for rapid data throughput. OpenSpace and its Digital Universe datasets work on all operating systems and is available for free download.

== See also ==
- Space flight simulation game
  - List of space flight simulation games
- Planetarium software
- List of observatory software
