= GoTo (telescopes) =

Type of telescope mount and related software

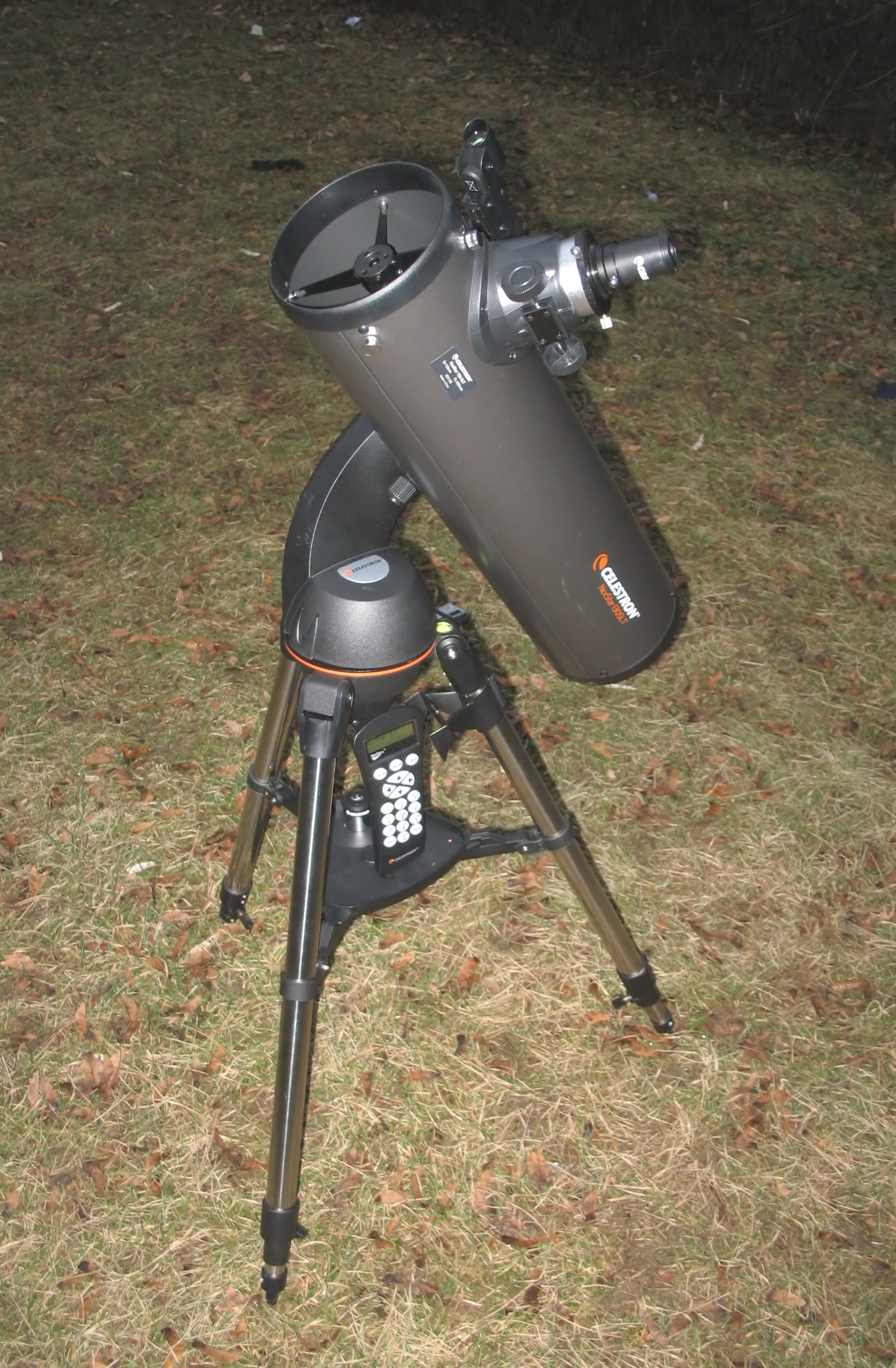
A telescope on an alt-azimuth GoTo mount. Note the keypad, resting on the platform between the tripod's legs, that is the telescope's hand control. Batteries are stored in the circular compartment just above the tripod. In this picture, the compartment is just above the hand control.

In amateur astronomy, "GoTo" refers to a type of telescope mount and related software that can automatically point a telescope at astronomical objects that the user selects. Both axes of a GoTo mount are driven by a motor and controlled by a computer. It may be either a microprocessor-based integrated controller or an external personal computer. This differs from the single-axis semi-automated tracking of a traditional clock-drive equatorial mount.

The user can command the mount to point the telescope to the celestial coordinates that the user inputs, or to objects in a pre-programmed database including ones from the Messier catalogue, the New General Catalogue, and even major Solar System bodies (the Sun, Moon, and planets).

Like a standard equatorial mount, equatorial GoTo mounts can track the night sky by driving the right ascension axis. Since both axes are computer controlled, GoTo technology also allows telescope manufacturers to add equatorial tracking to mechanically simpler altazimuth mounts.

== How a GoTo mount works ==
GoTo mounts are pre-aligned before use. When it is powered on, it may ask for the user's latitude, longitude, time, and date. It can also get this data from a GPS receiver connected to the telescope or built into the telescope mount itself, and the mount controller can have its own real time clock.

=== Alt-azimuth mounts ===
Alt-azimuth GoTo mounts need to be aligned on a known "alignment star", which the user will centre in the eyepiece. From the inputted time and location and the star's altitude and azimuth the telescope mount will know its orientation to the entire sky and can then find any object.

For accuracy purposes, a second alignment star, as far away as possible from the first and if possible close to the object to be observed, may be used. This is because the mount might not be level with the ground; this will cause the telescope to accurately point to objects close to the initial alignment star, but less accurately for an object on the other side of the sky.

An additional reason for using two alignment stars is that the time and location information entered by the user may not be accurate. For example, a one-degree inaccuracy in the latitude or a 4-minute inaccuracy in the time may result in the telescope pointing a degree away from the user's target.

When the user selects an object from the mount's database, the object's altitude and azimuth will be computed from its right ascension and declination. Then, the mount will move the telescope to that altitude and azimuth and track the object so it remains in the field of view despite Earth's rotation. Moving to the location is called slewing.

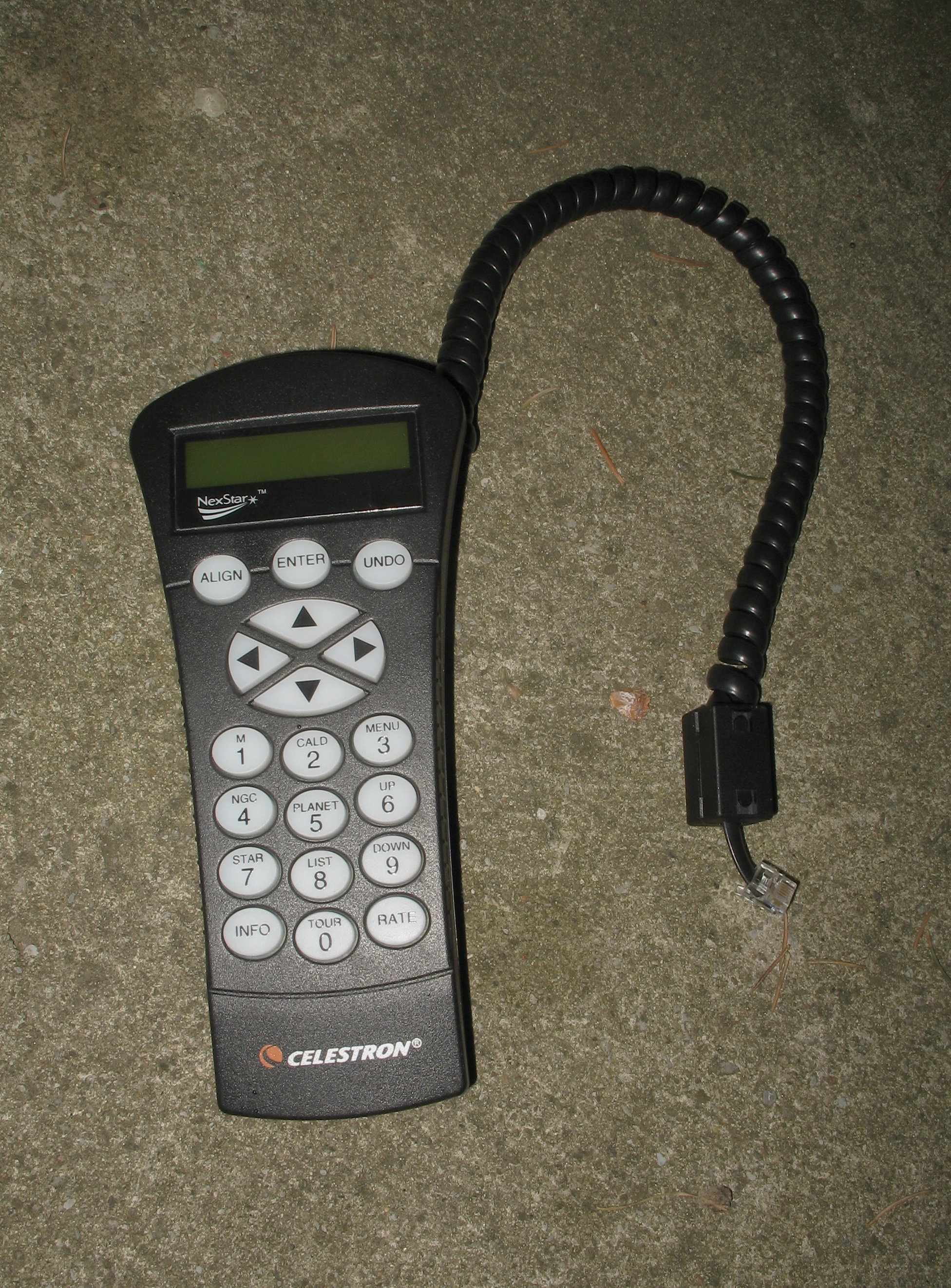
The disconnected hand control of a GoTo telescope mount. The large arrow buttons are used for slewing the telescope. Below these, the number buttons are used for both inputting information and selecting which catalogue to choose objects from.

When astrophotography is involved, a further motor has to be used to rotate the camera to match the field of view for long exposure photographs.

=== Equatorial mounts ===
For an equatorial GoTo telescope mount, the user must align the mount by hand with either the north celestial pole or the south celestial pole. Assuming the user is accurate in the alignment, the mount points the telescope to a bright star, asking the user to center it in the eyepiece. Since the star's correct right ascension and declination is already known, the distance from what the user considered to be the celestial pole and the actual pole can be roughly deduced. Using another alignment star can further improve the accuracy of the alignment.

After alignment the telescope mount will then know its orientation with respect to the night sky, and can point to any right-ascension and declination coordinates.

When the user selects an object to view, the mount's software looks up the object's right ascension and declination and slews (moves) to those coordinates. To track the object so that it stays in the eyepiece despite Earth's rotation, only the right-ascension axis is moved.

== Smart telescopes ==
Smart telescopes were introduced to the consumer market in the 2010s. They are self contained astronomical imaging devices that combine a small (50mm to 114mm objective) telescope and GoTo technology with pre-packaged software designed for astrophotography of deep-sky objects. They have no optical eyepiece or provision for use by eye but instead send an image gathered over time via image stacking to the user's smartphone or tablet, which also controls the device through an app.

== See also ==
- List of telescope parts and construction
- List of telescope types

=== Software ===
- Cartes du Ciel
- Hallo Northern Sky (HN Sky)
- KStars
- Stellarium
- XEphem
