= Guinness Book of Astronomy =

Book by Patrick Moore

First edition

The Guinness Book of Astronomy is a book (ISBN 0-85112-375-9) by the British astronomer Patrick Moore, first published in 1979, and running to seven editions.

The first part of the book is written like a Guinness Book of Records, with paragraphs like "the most luminous star", "the farthest star", and so on. Solar System objects are explained in detail.

The second part is a detailed sky atlas for amateur astronomy observations: for each constellation, a list of bright and dim stars, deep sky, and other notable objects is given to the reader. The object tables are so complete that this book alone is enough for months of observations with small telescopes.
