= Universe Sandbox =

Video game series

- Developer: Giant Army
- Publisher: Giant Army
- Programmers: Giant Army: Dan Dixon; Christian Herold; Georg Steinröhder; Thomas Grønneløv; Jenn Seiler; Jonathan Hoy; Dave Nelson; David Rappo; Mat Solomon; Jacob Williams; Erika Nesvold; Jared Meier; Eric Hilton; Naomi Goldenson; Chad Jenkins
- Composer: Ryan Macoubrie
- Series: Universe Sandbox
- Engine: Unity
- Platforms: Windows; MacOS; Linux
- Release: First game: May 2008; Second game: August 26, 2014 (public alpha)
- Genre: Simulation
- Mode: Single-player

Universe Sandbox is a series of simulation video games; users can see the effects of gravity on objects in the universe and run scale simulations of the Solar System, galaxies or other simulations with celestial bodies, interacting and controlling gravity, time and parameters like mass, density or radius of objects like moons, planets, asteroids, comets or black holes. The original Universe Sandbox was only released for Windows, but an updated version was released for Windows, macOS, and Linux in 2015 titled Universe Sandbox 2. It is often used for near-scientific simulations of space for illustrational purposes.

Universe Sandbox was designed by Dan Dixon, who released the first version in May 2008. Dixon worked full-time on the project since 2010, founding the Seattle-based company Giant Army the following year. Since then, he has hired eight additional designers for the company. Work on a new version of the game, originally titled Universe Sandbox^{2}, began in 2011. In November 2018, the original Universe Sandbox was renamed to Universe Sandbox Legacy, and the new version was then renamed to Universe Sandbox in December.

== Gameplay ==
During gameplay, the player can place and change the objects from the game's library, which includes all even slightly major celestial bodies of Solar System, tens of different stars like Proxima Centauri, Betelgeuse or Arcturus, known discovered exoplanets, black holes, several galactic formations which game handles as a separate type of object, not consisting of smaller elements, and also procedurally generated non-existent planets and moons. The player can change different characteristics of the planet like rotation period, mass, object speed, density, composition (for example change the components of the planetary core like silicates, helium or iron), influence life likelihood, as well as see maps of surface temperature or height and also control them and customise the outer look of the planet.

== Simulations ==
Player examining Earth using in-game interface; maps of liquid depth and surface temperature are shown on the left side of the screen.

Both realistic and fictional simulations appear in Universe Sandbox, with each area of outer space being placed by default or according to the player's preference. Real simulations include the Solar System, which includes all planets, 160+ moons, and hundreds of asteroids; or predictions of future events such as the Andromeda and Milky Way galaxy collision which will occur in 3.8 to 4.5 billion years. For example, a visual size comparison of the largest known stars and planets can be explored, real time animations of events like the Apophis asteroid passing near Earth in the year 2029 can be made, as well as comets can be observed colliding into planets, such as the Shoemaker Levy 9's collision with Jupiter. Visual Lagrange points of the Earth and Moon can be simulated, along with the galaxy and star system. The gamma-ray burst locations, found in distant galaxies, can be found, as well as supernovas can be shown in real time.

== Reception ==
Reception

Aggregate score
Aggregator	Score
Metacritic	83/100

Review score
Publication	Score
PC Gamer (UK)	84/100

Both games have received near-universal acclaim. Duncan Geere of PC Gamer gave it an 84/100 and spoke positively of the game, "Universe Sandbox is not going to change your life. It is not going to make you cry, and it won't sit in the top of your most-played list in Steam for weeks. But if you like the idea of an interactive orrery that you can rip apart and put back together in whatever way you like, and you're happy to feed it with a bit of imagination, it's hard to find a better way to spend £6." Jules of Wired said in their review, "I've seen some pretty wonderful interactive programs that allow you and your family to explore the vast regions of the universe, but nothing nearly as enthralling as Universe Sandbox. Unlike most astronomy software that just shows you what the sky looks like or where the planets are, Universe Sandbox is a powerful gravity simulator."

== Remake ==
The first game of the series was released in 2008; in 2011, the team began working on a complete remake of Universe Sandbox featuring an entirely different game engine, originally titled Universe Sandbox^{2}. Some of the new features include atmospheres being shown on planets, simulation of planet compositions and surfaces, dynamic and procedurally generated textures on stars and gas giants, a more realistic and graphic collision system, control over planetary life ecosystem, 3D charts in chart mode, simulation of stellar evolution, procedural detail in rings/particles, visualisation of black holes, simulation of fluid-like objects (such as gas clouds, surface water, nebulae and protoplanetary disks, and planetary collisions) and other. The team demonstrated many of these features at the Unite 2012 conference. On November 15, 2018, the feature to share player-made simulations through Steam Workshop was added. Examples of simulations include situations like Planet X crashing into Earth, Solar System in real time and position, collision of two black holes or terraformed versions of real planets like Venus. In December 2018, the game was renamed from Universe Sandbox^{2} to Universe Sandbox, citing disputes over the game's pronunciation.

== See also ==
- Space flight simulation game – Genre of flight simulator video games
  - List of space flight simulation games – List of spaceflight games
- Planetarium software – Software to simulate day and nighttime sky
- List of video games considered the best
- List of observatory software
- Gravity (software)
