= HNSKY =

Night sky simulator software

- HNSKY screenshot centered on the South Celestial Pole (SCP)
- Developer: Han Kleijn
- Stable release: 4.3.2d (Microsoft Windows); 4.3.2d (Linux 64); 4.3.2b (Linux 32); 4.3.2 (macOS); 4.3.2d (arm64); 4.3.2d (armhf) / March 24, 2025
- Preview release: 4.3.2d / March 24, 2025
- Written in: Pascal
- Operating system: Linux, macOS, Windows
- Platform: AMD64; i386; armhf (Raspberry PI)
- Size: 80.3 MB
- Type: Planetarium
- License: GNU General Public License v3
- Website: www.hnsky.org
- Repository: sourceforge.net/p/hnsky/code/ci/default/tree/

HNSKY or Hallo Northern Sky is a free and open-source planetarium program for Linux, macOS, Microsoft Windows, and Raspberry Pi to simulate the night sky. It is provided with several non-English language modules, numerous astronomical catalogues, conversion utilities and tools, as well as several stellar databases.

HNSKY was created in 1998 by Dutchman Han Kleijn, who continues to develop and maintain the application. It is available in both 32 bit and 64 bit versions.

Initially a basic planetarium program, it has expanded in functionality to include the ability to control computerized GoTo telescope mounts. It is ASCOM and Instrument Neutral Distributed Interface (INDI) compliant, and supports the United States Naval Observatory's USNO CCD Astrograph Catalog (UCAC) catalogs, and European Space Agency Gaia data.

== See also ==
- Space flight simulation game
  - List of space flight simulation games
- Planetarium software
- List of observatory software
