= Sky Map =

Android software app

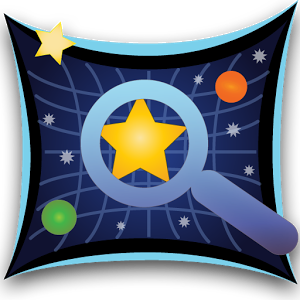
- Developers: Google; Penterakt LLC
- Stable release: 2.0.0 / 2 September 2026
- Operating system: Android, iOS
- Type: Planetarium software
- License: Gnu General Public License Version 3.0
- Website: getskymap.app
- Repository: github.com/sky-map-team/stardroid

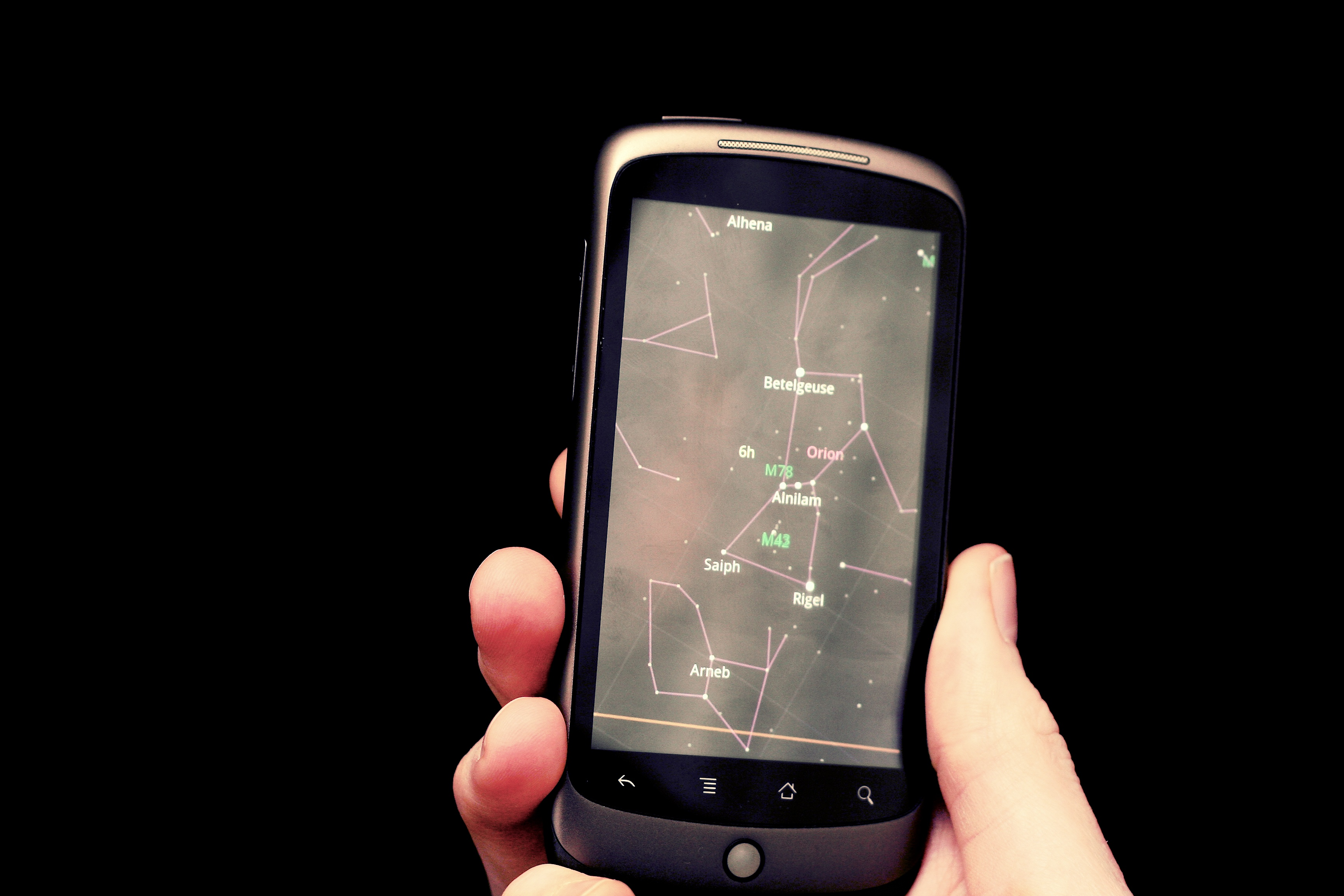
Sky Map in use on a Nexus One

Sky Map is a planetarium software application for Android and iOS. It was designed and developed by a group of Google engineers in Pittsburgh, Pennsylvania as part of their 20% time, and is now "donated and open-sourced", available as a GitHub repository.

== Licensing ==
On January 20, 2012, Google announced a student development partnership with Carnegie Mellon University and released Sky Map under the Apache 2.0 open source license.

== See also ==
- Google Sky
- Planetarium software
- Stellarium
- Star chart - map of the night sky
