= Cartes du Ciel =

Free desktop planetarium

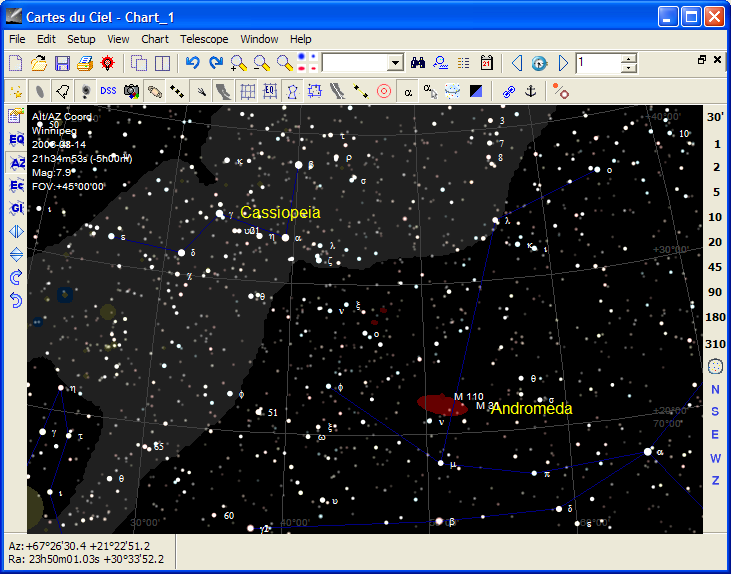
- Screenshot of Version 3 beta 0.1.0
- Developer: Patrick Chevalley
- Stable release: 4.2.1 / 24 November 2019; 6 years ago
- Preview release: 4.3-4905 / December 9, 2024
- Written in: Object Pascal
- Operating system: Cross-platform (Microsoft Windows, macOS, Linux)
- Type: planetarium Educational software
- License: GPLv2
- Website: Cartes du Ciel homepage

Cartes du Ciel ("CDC" and "SkyChart") is a free and open source planetarium program for Linux, macOS, and Windows. With the change to version 3, Linux has been added as a target platform, licensing has changed from freeware to GPLv2 and the project moved to a new website.

CDC includes the ability to control computerized GoTo telescope mounts, is ASCOM and INDI compliant, and supports the USNO's UCAC catalogs and ESA Gaia data, along with numerous other catalogs and utilities.

The "red bulb" feature is useful when using software outside on a laptop on a dark night.

According to the programmer, Patrick Chevalley, it was released as freeware because "I’d rather see amateurs spend their money for a new eyepiece than for astronomy software".

Chevalley has also created a lunar atlas program, Virtual Moon Atlas, which is also free and open source software.

== See also ==
- Space flight simulation game
  - List of space flight simulation games
- Planetarium software
- List of observatory software
