= Bob Denny =

American computer scientist

Bob Denny (fl. late 20th century) is an American software developer who writes software for robotic telescope and remote telescope systems. He is the inventor of the Astronomy Common Object Model (ASCOM) standard, which has resulted in the easy availability of freeware device drivers for telescopes, telescope focusers, and astronomical observatory domes and enclosures.

Denny is also noted for developing the first web server software for Microsoft Windows 3.1, 95, and NT 4 (Windows HTTPd), as the inventor of the Windows Common Gateway Interface which allows Visual Basic to be used as a web server back-end language, the first Java web server back-end system, and as the author of the O'Reilly WebSite Pro web server. He is a uniformed/armed volunteer for the Maricopa County, Arizona Sheriff's office.

The asteroid 23257 Denny is named in his honor.
