= Uniview =

Chinese video surveillance manufacturer

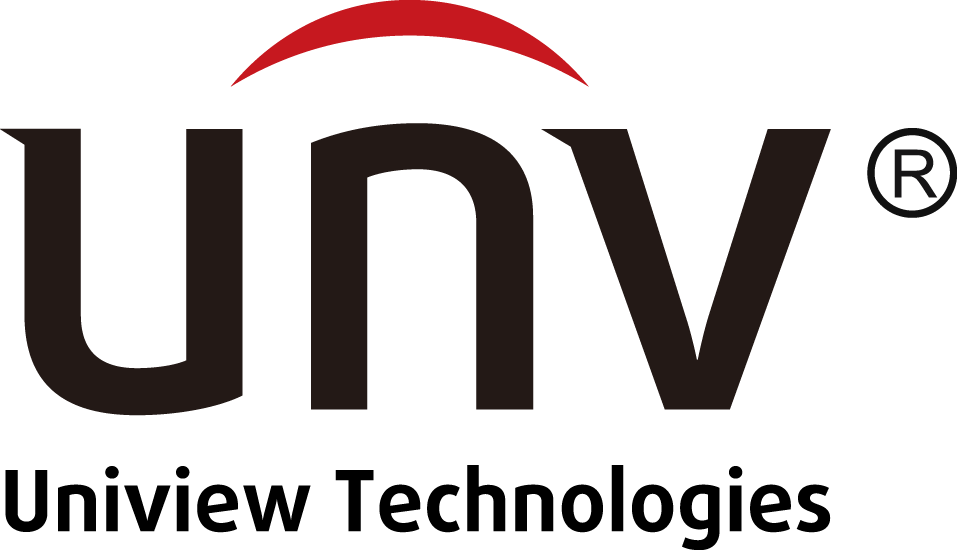
- Native name: 宇视
- Industry: Video surveillance
- Founded: 2005; 21 years ago
- Headquarters: Hangzhou, China
- Key people: Hermit Zhang (CEO) 胡鹏 (cfo)
- Products: IP cameras
- Revenue: ▲CN¥6.073 billion (2021)
- Owner: China Transinfo
- Website: www.uniview.com

Uniview (Chinese: 宇视; abbreviated as UNV), also known as Uniview Technologies, short for Zhejiang Uniview Technologies Co., Ltd., is a Chinese video surveillance manufacturer founded in 2005, with headquarters in Hangzhou. The company was previously invested in and owned by American private investment firm Bain Capital.

Uniview specializes in surveillance equipment, including IP cameras and network video recorders. In December 2011, its video surveillance unit was bought from Hewlett-Packard by a fund affiliated with Bain Capital. Since 2012, Uniview has been selling "public safety" solutions to the Chinese government in the Tibet Autonomous Region.

== History ==
Uniview became involved in the video surveillance field in 2005. After being spun off from Hewlett-Packard, it began operating independently in 2011.

On November 30, 2011, Hermit Zhang became the CEO of Uniview. According to IPVM, Uniview "created Uyghur tracking software, and coauthored government standards on ethnicity-detection technology."

Uniview made its way into overseas markets in 2014. In 2016, its revenue reached ¥2.4 billion. In 2017, it became a reseller and alliance partner of Quantum.

In 2017, a vulnerability appeared in Uniview recorders, through which an attacker could remotely obtain the administrator account and password. From October to December of the same year, Uniview released multiple firmwares that fixed this vulnerability.

In 2018, China TransInfo acquired Uniview from Bain Capital. The same year, Intel sued Uniview in a Beijing court over a trademark dispute over "intel inside" and "imos inside", and in March, the court ruled in Intel's favor in the first instance. In April of the same year, Uniview appealed to the Beijing Higher People's Court, which issued a final judgment in favor of Uniview in July 2019.

In March 2023, a bill was introduced in the U.S. Congress to impose sanctions on Uniview for its alleged participation in mass surveillance of Uyghurs and Tibetans.
