= Hubble Guide Star Catalog – Astrographic Catalog/Tycho =

The Hubble Guide Star Catalog – Astrographic Catalog/Tycho (GSC-ACT) is an astronomical catalog which records the twenty million stars of the Hubble GSC, version 1.1, recalibrated using the U.S. Naval Observatory's ACT (Astrographic Catalog/Tycho). By 2009 it was considered obsolete, superseded by such catalogues as GSC-2.2, B1.0, A2.0, and especially UCAC-3.

GSC-ACT was a re-calibration of the Guide Star Catalog version 1.1 for Hubble. The original GSC dated to 1989, and one of the reasons for an update was improvements to star catalogs that took place after that time. In this case the ACT catalog was used, which had for example more stars; whereas the GSC 1.1 had a third-order fit for plate distortions, the ACT has a five-order available. Another improvement of the GSC 1.1 was the GSC 1.2.

GSC-ACT uses five classification codes:

- 1 Star
- 2 Galaxy
- 3 Non-Star
- 4 Artefact

== See also ==
- Guide Star Catalog
- Tycho catalog
- Tycho-2 Catalogue
