= Maxim DL =

Software

MaxIm DL
- Developer(s): Diffraction Limited
- Stable release: 7.1.4
- Operating system: Microsoft Windows
- Platform: x64
- Type: Astronomical Imaging and Analysis
- License: Proprietary
- Website: www.cyanogen.com/product/maxim-dl/

MaxIm DL is a software package developed by Diffraction Limited and sold under the Cyanogen Imaging brand. It is used for acquisition, processing, and analysis of astronomical imaging. It contains tools to process and analyze data from imaging array detectors such as CCDs and CMOS Imagers.

It is available for Windows 10 and later.
