= Guide Star Catalog =

Catalog of stars

- Alternative names: Hubble Space Telescope, Guide Catalog
- Related media on Commons

The Guide Star Catalog (GSC), also known as the Hubble Space Telescope, Guide Catalog (HSTGC), is a star catalog compiled to support the Hubble Space Telescope with targeting off-axis stars. GSC-I contained approximately 20,000,000 stars with apparent magnitudes of 6 to 15. GSC-II contains 945,592,683 stars out to magnitude 21. As far as possible, binary stars and non-stellar objects have been excluded or flagged as not meeting the requirements of Fine Guidance Sensors. This is the first full sky star catalog created specifically for navigation in outer space.

== History ==
=== Version 1.0 ===
The first version of this catalog was published in 1989. The first catalog was created by digitizing photographic plates produced by the Palomar Schmidt Quick-V survey for the northern hemisphere and the UK Schmidt SERC-J survey for the southern hemisphere. This catalog contains objects in the magnitude range 7-16 and the classification was biased to prevent the use of a non-stellar object as a guide star. The photometry is based on a photoelectric sequence (9-15th mag) near the center of each Schmidt plate. Stellar photometry was performed in a manner that would systematically reject galaxies. Astrometry was determined using the AGK3, SAOC or CPC catalog stars depending on plate declination. Although the relative astrometry (required for HST) is about 0.3 arc seconds, there are known systematic errors near the plate edges of 1 to 2 arc seconds.

=== Version 1.1 ===
The first revision of the catalog was published in 1992. The Tycho Input Catalog was created by the Hipparcos/Tycho international consortia in preparation for the Hipparcos satellite mission. They produced a catalog containing the best available data for all stars to magnitude 11. Adding the bright star data from this catalog to the GSC produced a complete all-sky catalog down to the GSC limiting magnitude. In addition, many of the false objects due to artifacts around the halos and diffraction spikes of the bright stars were identified and corrected as well as a number of reported errors. A number of astrographic plates centered on southern hemisphere bright stars (of magnitude less than 3) were also processed and added to the catalog. This was the version used by HST operations prior to cycle 15.

=== Version 1.2 ===
Version 1.2 was published in 2001. It was produced in collaboration with the Astronomisches Rechen-Institut in Heidelberg. This version reduces the plate-based position-dependent and magnitude-dependent systematic errors. The PPM and AC reference catalogs were used and absolute position errors have been reduced to between 0.3 and 0.4 arc seconds.

== Catalog format ==
When quoting a catalog entry, the format is GSC FFFFF-NNNNN, or alternately, GSCfffff0nnnnn (fffff0nnnnn). The F-sequence references a Hubble sky region code.

== Guide Star Catalog II ==
A significant expansion of the catalog, Guide Star Catalog II, was published in 2008. The Guide Star Catalog II (GSC-II) was compiled by the Catalog and Surveys branch of the Space Telescope Science Institute and the astrometry team of the Astronomical Observatory of Torino (Italy). It has entries for 945,592,683 stars, and has positions, classifications, and magnitudes for 455,851,237 stars. The latest revision of this version (2.3.4) is in active use for accurately positioning the Hubble Space Telescope.

== See also ==
- Hubble Guide Star Catalog - Astrographic Catalog/Tycho (GSC-ACT)
- Hubble Space Telescope
- Space Telescope Science Institute
- Star catalog
- Fine Guidance Sensor (HST)
