= List of observatory software =

The following is a list of astronomical observatory software.

== Commercial software ==
- MaximDL

== Non-commercial software ==
- Aladin Sky Atlas
- Astropy
- Cartes du Ciel
- Celestia
- Google Sky
- Hallo Northern Sky
- IRAF
- Instrument Neutral Distributed Interface
- KStars
- Mitaka
- NASA World Wind
- PP3
- SpaceEngine
- Space Telescope Science Data Analysis System
- Starlink Project
- Stellarium
- SuperNOVAS
- WorldWide Telescope
- XEphem

== See also ==
- Space flight simulation game
  - List of space flight simulation games
- Planetarium software
