= KStars =

Graphical desktop planetarium

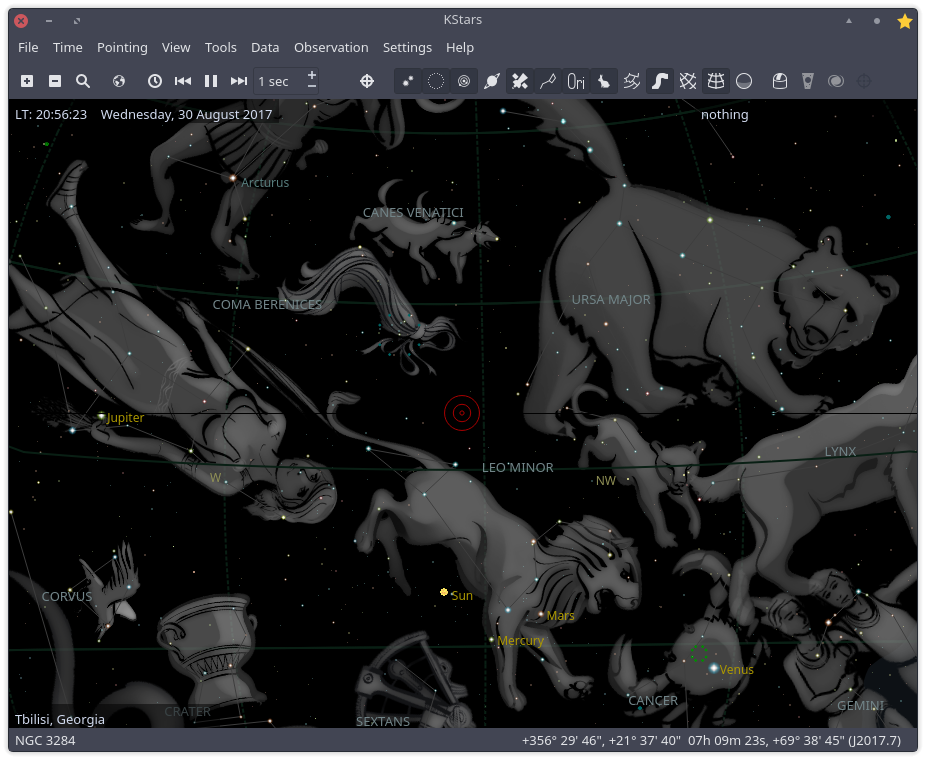
- Screenshot of KStars showing the night sky from Tbilisi, Georgia
- Developer: KDE developers
- Stable release: 3.7.7 / 31 May 2025; 6 months ago
- Repository: invent.kde.org/education/kstars
- Written in: C++
- Operating system: Unix-like, Windows, Android
- Platform: KDE
- Type: Educational software
- License: GPLv2
- Website: edu.kde.org/kstars/

KStars is a free and open-source planetarium program built using the KDE Frameworks. It is available for Linux, BSD, macOS, and Microsoft Windows. A light version of KStars is available for Android devices. It provides an accurate graphical representation of the night sky, from any location on Earth, at any date and time. The display includes up to 100 million stars (with additional addons), 13,000 deep sky objects, constellations from different cultures, all 8 planets, the Sun and Moon, and thousands of comets, asteroids, satellites, and supernovae. It has features to appeal to users of all levels, from informative hypertext articles about astronomy, to robust control of telescopes and CCD cameras, and logging of observations of specific objects.

KStars supports adjustable simulation speeds in order to view phenomena that happen over long timescales. For astronomical calculations, Astrocalculator can be used to predict conjunctions, lunar eclipses, and perform many common astronomical calculations. The following tools are included:

- Observation planner
- Sky calendar tool
- Script Builder
- Solar System
- Jupiter Moons
- Flags: Custom flags superimposed on the sky map.
- FOV editor to calculate field of view of equipment and display them.
- Altitude vs. Time tool to plot altitude vs. time graphs for any object.
- Hierarchical Progress Surveys (HiPS) overlay.
- High quality print outs for sky charts.
- Ekos is an astrophotography suite, a complete astrophotography solution that can control all INDI devices including numerous telescopes, CCDs, DSLRs, focusers, filters, and a lot more. Ekos supports highly accurate tracking using online and offline astrometry solver, auto-focus and auto-guiding capabilities, and capture of single or multiple images using the powerful built in sequence manager.

KStars has been packaged by many Linux/BSD distributions, including Red Hat Linux, OpenSUSE, Arch Linux, and Debian. Some distributions package KStars as a separate application, some just provide a kdeedu package, which includes KStars. KStars is distributed with the KDE Software Compilation as part of the kdeedu "Edutainment" module.

KStars participated in Google Summer of Code in 2008, 2009, 2010, 2011 2012, 2015 and 2016. It has also participated in the first run of ESA's Summer of Code in Space in 2011.

It has been identified as one of the three best "Linux stargazing apps" in a Linux.com review.

== See also ==
- Space flight simulation game
  - List of space flight simulation games
- Planetarium software
- List of observatory software
