= Planetarium software =

Software to simulate day and nighttime sky

Planetarium software is application software that allows a user to simulate the celestial sphere at any time of day, especially at night, on a computer. Such applications can be as rudimentary as displaying a star chart or sky map for a specific time and location, or as complex as rendering photorealistic views of the sky.

While some planetarium software is meant to be used exclusively on a personal computer, some applications can be used to interface with and control telescopes or planetarium projectors. Optional features may include inserting the orbital elements of comets and other newly discovered bodies for display.

== Comparison of planetarium software ==
Name	Latest release	License		Operating system				
Name	Latest release	License		Windows	Linux	macOS	Android	iOS
Astrarium	September 9, 2024	MIT License		Yes	No	No	No	No
C2A	May 1, 2021	Proprietary		Yes	No	No	No	No
Cartes du Ciel	November 24, 2019	GPLv2		Yes	Yes	Yes	No	No
Celestia	November 4, 2023	GPLv2		Yes	Yes	Yes	Yes	Yes
Digital Universe Atlas	July 18, 2024	Illinois Open Source License		No	Yes	Yes	No	Yes
HNSKY	June 14, 2024	GNU General Public License v3		Yes	Yes	Yes	No	No
KStars	August 9, 2026	GPLv2		Yes	Yes	Yes	Yes	No
Stellarium	September 22, 2024	GPLv2		Yes	Yes	Yes	Partial (limited)	Partial (limited)
OpenSpace	July 18, 2024	MIT License		Yes	Yes	No	No	No
Nightshade	2022	GPLv3 (Nightshade Legacy)	Nightshade Public License (Nightshade NG)	Yes	Yes	Yes	No	No
SkyExplorer	2024	Proprietary		Yes	No	No	No	No
Sky Map	November 30, 2024	Apache License, Version 2.0		No	No	No	Yes	No
SpaceEngine	December 5, 2024	Proprietary		Yes	Yes (Proton); Native build Planned	Planned	No	No
XEphem	February 13, 2024	MIT License		No	Yes	Yes	No	No
WorldWide Telescope	July 12, 2022	MIT License		Yes	No	No	No	No
Redshift	May 19, 2024	Proprietary		Yes	No	Yes	Yes	Yes
SkySafari	December 10, 2024	Proprietary		No	No	Yes	Yes	Yes
Starry Night	-	Proprietary		Yes	No	Yes	No	No
Sky Guide	August 18, 2021	Proprietary		No	No	No	No	Yes
TheSky	July 12, 2024	Proprietary		Yes	Yes	Yes	No	No
WinStars	December 28, 2023	Proprietary		Yes	Yes	No	Yes	No
Google Sky	-	Proprietary		-	-	-	-	-
Digistar	-	Proprietary		-	-	-	-	-
Shira Player (software)	May 20, 2024	GPLv2		Yes	No	No	No	No
Shira Universe (software)	July 27, 2024	MIT License		Yes	No	No	No	No
PlanetariumVR (virtual reality)	December 17, 2021	Proprietary		Yes	No	No	No	No

== See also ==
- Space flight simulation game
  - List of space flight simulation games
- List of observatory software
