= Deep-sky object =

Any astronomical object that is not an individual star

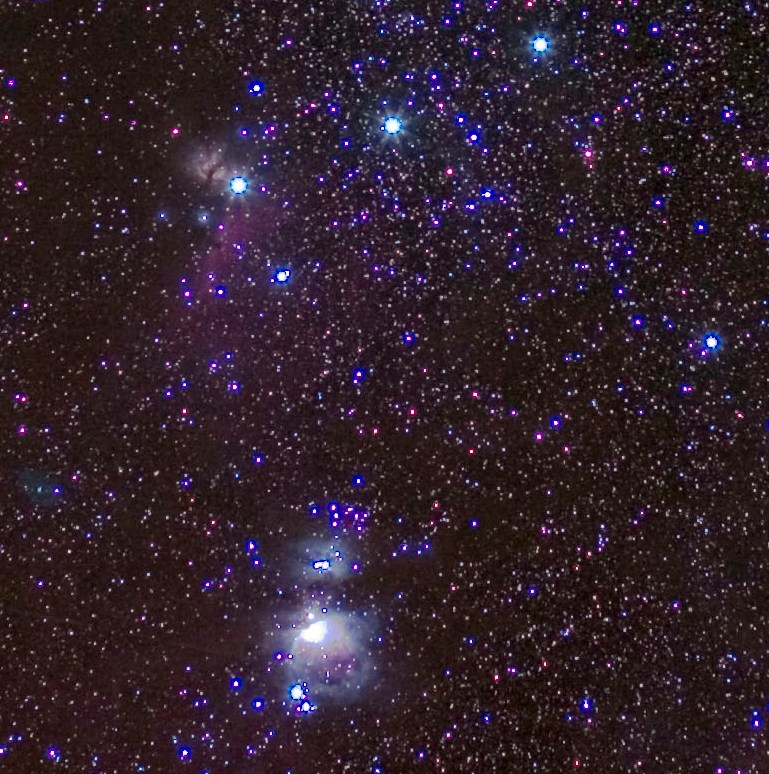
Several nebulae in the constellation Orion commonly called deep-sky objects

A deep-sky object (DSO) is any astronomical object that is not an individual star or Solar System object (such as Sun, Moon, planet, comet, etc.). The classification is used for the most part by amateur astronomers to denote visually observed faint naked eye and telescopic objects such as star clusters, nebulae and galaxies. This distinction is practical and technical, implying a variety of instruments and techniques appropriate to observation, and does not distinguish the nature of the object itself.

== Origins and classification ==
Classifying non-stellar astronomical objects began soon after the invention of the telescope. One of the earliest comprehensive lists was Charles Messier's 1774 Messier catalog, which included 103 "nebulae" and other faint fuzzy objects he considered a nuisance since they could be mistaken for comets, the objects he was actually searching for. As telescopes improved these faint nebulae would be broken into more descriptive scientific classifications such as interstellar clouds, star clusters, and galaxies.

"Deep-sky object", as an astronomical classification for these objects, has its origins in the modern field of amateur astronomy. The origin of the term is unknown but it was popularized by Sky & Telescope magazine's "Deep-Sky Wonders" column, which premiered in the magazine's first edition in 1941. Houston's columns, and later book compilations of those columns, helped popularize the term, each month giving the reader a guided tour of a small part of the sky highlighting well-known and lesser-known objects for binoculars and small telescopes.

== Observations and activities ==
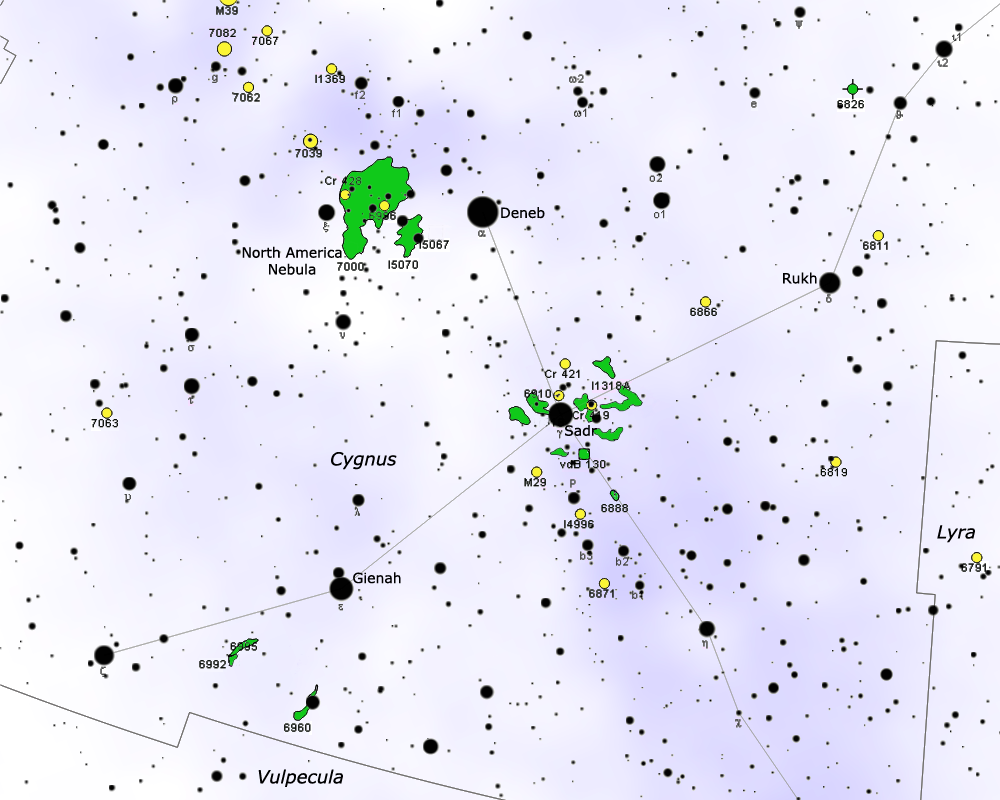
Map of the constellation Cygnus marking the location of bright and more challenging deep-sky objects

There are many amateur astronomical techniques and activities associated with deep-sky objects. Some of these objects are bright enough to find and see in binoculars and small telescopes. But the faintest objects need the light-gathering power of telescopes with large objectives, and since they are invisible to the naked eye, can be hard to find. This has led to increased popularity of GoTo telescopes that can find DSOs automatically, and large reflecting telescopes, such as Dobsonian style telescopes, with wide fields of view well suited to such observing. Observing faint objects needs dark skies, so these relatively portable types of telescopes also lend themselves to the majority of amateurs who need to travel outside light polluted urban locations. To cut down light pollution and enhance contrast, observers employ nebular filters, which are designed to admit certain wavelengths of light and block others.

There are organized activities associated with DSOs such as the Messier marathon, which occurs at a specific time each year and involves observers trying to spot all 110 Messier objects in one night. Since the Messier catalog objects were discovered with relatively small 18th-century telescopes, it is a popular list with observers, being well within the grasp of most modern amateur telescopes. Other deep-sky object catalogues commonly used by amateur astronomers include the Caldwell catalogue and Stephen James O'Meara's deep-sky object lists published in his Deep-Sky Companions book series. The Herschel 400 Catalogue is also a popular list with observers and is considered more challenging; it was designed for larger telescopes and experienced amateur astronomers.

== List of deep-sky object types ==
There are many astronomical object types that come under the description of deep-sky objects. Since the definition is objects that are not Solar System objects or individual stars, examples include:

- Black holes and active galactic nuclei
- Nebulae
  - Bright nebulae
    - Emission nebulae
    - Reflection nebulae
    - H II regions
    - Diffuse ionized gas
    - Planetary nebulae
    - Supernova remnants
  - Dark nebulae
- Galaxies
- Star clusters
  - Open clusters
  - Globular clusters

== See also ==
- Amateur telescope making
- Celestial cartography
- Shallow sky
- Star catalogue
- Star hopping
