= ESASky =

Web-based astronomical data discovery portal developed by the European Space Agency

- Developers: ESAC Science Data Centre (ESDC), European Space Agency
- Release: 9 May 2016; 10 years ago (version 1.0)
- Stable release: 7.9.1 / 1 October 2026; 31 days ago
- Written in: Java (Google Web Toolkit), JavaScript
- Operating system: Cross-platform (web browser)
- Platform: Web
- Available in: English, Spanish, Chinese (Mandarin)
- Type: Virtual observatory, sky atlas, data discovery portal
- License: Free of charge
- Website: sky.esa.int

ESASky is a free, web-based discovery portal and interactive sky atlas developed by the European Space Agency (ESA) at the ESAC Science Data Centre (ESDC) of the European Space Astronomy Centre near Madrid, Spain. It gives users access to science-ready images, catalogues, spectra and time-series data from ESA's astronomy missions and from a growing number of missions and observatories operated by other agencies, including NASA's Chandra and Spitzer, JAXA's Suzaku and AKARI, and the ALMA observatory.

The portal displays all-sky maps built from real observations using the Hierarchical Progressive Surveys (HiPS) standard, allowing users to switch between, or blend, views of the sky at wavelengths ranging from gamma rays to radio. The footprints of individual observations can be overlaid on these maps, giving a visual summary of the multi-wavelength coverage of any target or region, and data can be previewed and downloaded without having to query each mission archive separately. ESASky is aimed at professional astronomers but is also used in education and public outreach.

== History ==
The project was conceived at ESAC as a single entry point to the archives of all of ESA's astronomy missions, designed so that users could find data "without prior knowledge of any of the missions". A first beta version was released on 25 October 2015, to coincide with the 25th Astronomical Data Analysis Software and Systems (ADASS XXV) conference in Sydney. It already offered all-sky HiPS maps from INTEGRAL, XMM-Newton, the Hubble Space Telescope (HST), the Infrared Space Observatory (ISO), AKARI, Herschel and Planck, together with footprint display, download management and integration with the SIMBAD astronomical database.

Version 1.0 was released on 9 May 2016. It organised the sky maps by wavelength, added Virtual Observatory (VO) interoperability through the Simple Application Messaging Protocol (SAMP), and allowed export of results in CSV and VOTable formats. At launch it gave access to imaging from five ESA missions and Suzaku, and to eleven ESA mission catalogues from Gaia, Hipparcos, HST, INTEGRAL, Planck and XMM-Newton. Its release was covered by the Spanish and Italian press and by Spanish public television, and presented at the 2016 meeting of the Spanish Astronomical Society.

Subsequent releases during 2016 and 2017 added a module for the Astroquery Python package (version 1.2), the first Gaia data release (version 1.3), a planning tool for the James Webb Space Telescope (version 1.4) and Chandra X-ray imaging (version 1.5). Version 2.0, released on 20 October 2017, introduced a redesigned, mobile-friendly interface, a treemap summary of available data, spectra from several missions and a search for Solar System objects in imaging data.

Version 3.0 (November 2018) split the interface into an "Explorer" mode for general users and a "Science" mode for researchers, and added links to Microsoft's WorldWide Telescope. A Spanish translation followed in March 2019, and a Chinese-language version, produced together with the National Astronomical Observatories of China (NAOC) of the Chinese Academy of Sciences, was launched in June 2020; together the three languages were said to cover nearly a quarter of the world's population in their native language.

In October 2021 ESASky began a collaboration with ESA/Hubble, which made all of Hubble's public outreach images available in the portal, linked to the archival science data behind them. A similar collaboration with ESA/Webb followed in October 2022, after the start of science operations of the James Webb Space Telescope. Version 4.0 (2021) also added gravitational wave events from LIGO and Virgo, and version 4.1 (2022) added high-energy neutrino events from IceCube.

Since 2023 the portal has been extended to external archives through VO Table Access Protocol (TAP) services and VizieR (version 5.0), live alerts from the fourth LIGO–Virgo–KAGRA observing run (version 5.1), and data from ESA's Euclid mission, including its early-release observations (2023–2024) and its first "Quick" data release (Q1) in March 2025. Version 7.0 (November 2024) added a time-series viewer, and version 7.4 (October 2025) allowed sessions to be sent to Jupyter notebooks on the ESA Datalabs platform.

== Features ==
=== Sky maps and footprints ===
ESASky's main view is an interactive map of the whole sky, rendered with the Aladin Lite viewer developed by the Centre de données astronomiques de Strasbourg (CDS). Users can choose from a large set of all-sky HiPS maps, from gamma-ray and X-ray surveys to optical, infrared, microwave and radio surveys, including ESA-produced maps from missions such as Planck, Herschel, XMM-Newton, INTEGRAL and Gaia. The footprints of all observations within the field of view are drawn on the map and summarised in a treemap that shows, on a logarithmic scale, how much data each mission holds for that region.

=== Catalogues, spectra and time series ===
Source catalogues from missions including Gaia, Hipparcos, HST, XMM-Newton, Chandra, Herschel, Planck, INTEGRAL and eROSITA can be overlaid on the sky, and stellar proper motions from Gaia can be shown as arrows. Spectra are available from instruments on XMM-Newton, the International Ultraviolet Explorer, HST, ISO, Herschel and Chandra. A time-series viewer, introduced in 2024, plots light curves from Gaia, XMM-Newton, CHEOPS, CoRoT and INTEGRAL.

=== Multi-messenger astronomy ===
ESASky displays the sky localisation regions of gravitational-wave events detected by the LIGO–Virgo–KAGRA collaboration, including alerts received automatically during observing runs, as well as the arrival directions of IceCube neutrino events, so that users can look for electromagnetic counterparts in archival data.

=== Publications ===
A publications tool, introduced in version 2.1 (2018), uses the NASA Astrophysics Data System (ADS) and SIMBAD to show which sources in the field of view have been mentioned in the scientific literature.

=== Planning tool ===
The JWST planning tool projects the footprints of the instruments of the James Webb Space Telescope onto the sky, helping astronomers prepare observing proposals. Generic footprints for other missions, such as XMM-Newton, have since been added.

=== Solar System objects ===
Users can search for observations in which planets, moons, comets or asteroids were captured by missions such as XMM-Newton, Herschel and HST, using ephemerides provided by the IMCCE.

=== Outreach images ===
Public outreach images from ESA/Hubble, ESA/Webb and Euclid are shown in their correct position and orientation on the sky, and can be blended with other surveys or compared with the underlying science data. In October 2023, for example, the wide-angle Webb mosaic of the Orion Nebula in which Jupiter-mass binary objects were reported was released in ESASky.

=== Programmatic access ===
ESASky offers a JavaScript API that allows it to be embedded and controlled in other web pages, an Astroquery module for bulk data access in Python, and the pyESASky package, which embeds ESASky in Jupyter notebooks. Its metadata are also exposed through a TAP service queried with the Astronomical Data Query Language (ADQL).

== Technology ==
The front end of ESASky is written in Java and compiled to JavaScript with the Google Web Toolkit, while the back end is a Java web application running on Apache Tomcat together with a TAP+ server. Geometric searches are performed on a PostgreSQL database with the Q3C and pgSphere extensions, and the Highcharts library is used for the treemap. HiPS maps are generated on the ESAC computing grid; in 2017 this involved more than 500,000 jobs consuming 41.4 CPU-years, and the use of a content delivery network reduced average page load times from about 30 seconds to 3 seconds.

== Education and outreach ==
ESASky is used as a teaching tool in schools and universities, and the ESDC provides classroom activities based on real mission data. Educational resources based on the portal were promoted by the Spanish Astronomical Society in 2019, and the project has been presented as a case study in open scientific data.

== Reception ==
Between its launch and 2026, ESASky has been acknowledged in a growing number of refereed papers, which the ESDC tracks in a public ADS library. It has been featured by amateur astronomy magazines in Spain and Italy, and its outreach collaborations with ESA/Hubble, ESA/Webb and Euclid have been used in ESA press releases.

== See also ==
- Aladin Sky Atlas
- European Space Astronomy Centre
- Virtual observatory
- WorldWide Telescope
- Google Sky
