= Marble (software) =

Virtual globe 3-D modeling application

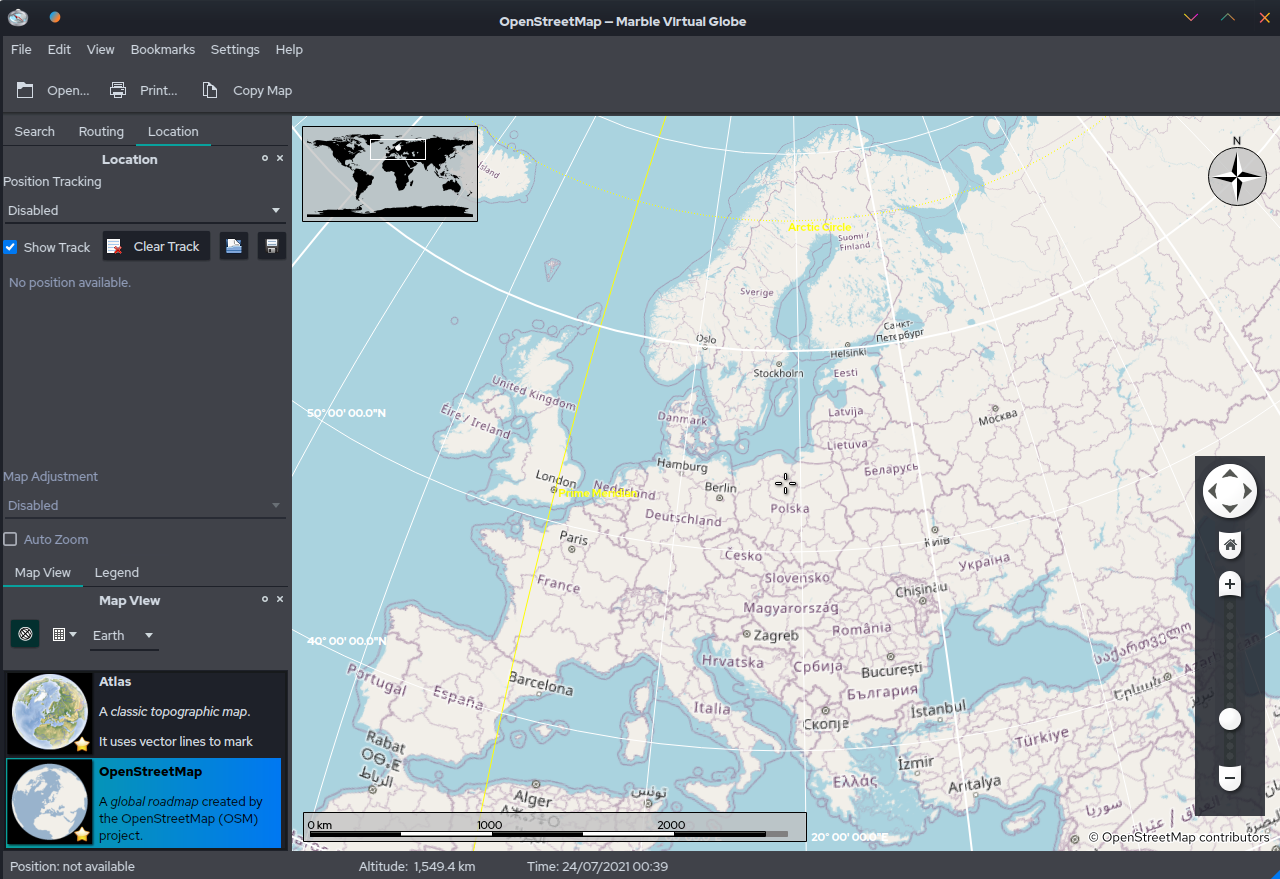
- Screenshot of Marble showing Europe
- Developer: KDE
- Release: November 2006; 19 years ago
- Stable release: 25.08.1 / 9 September 2025; 13 months ago
- Preview release: 1.5.0 (February 6, 2013; 13 years ago) [±]
- Written in: C++ (Qt)
- Operating system: Unix-like, Windows, Android
- Available in: Multiple languages
- Type: Virtual globe, route planning software
- License: GNU LGPL
- Website: marble.kde.org
- Repository: invent.kde.org/education/marble

Marble is a virtual globe application which allows the user to choose among the Earth, the Moon, Venus, Mars and other planets to display as a 3-D model. It is free software under the terms of the GNU LGPL, developed by KDE for use on personal computers and smart phones. It is written in C++ and uses Qt.

Marble is intended to be very flexible; beyond its cross-platform design, the core components can easily be integrated into other programs. It is designed to run without the need for hardware acceleration, but it can be extended to use OpenGL. An important user-experience objective being that the application start fairly quickly, it ships with a minimal but useful off-line dataset (5–10MB).

Contributors have added support for on-line mapping sources such as OpenStreetMap and the ability to interpret KML files. Marble also provides route planning capabilities. A navigation mode called MarbleToGo was developed as part of Google Summer of Code 2010. It was later partially rewritten and renamed to Marble Touch.

Geothek is a fork of Marble adding a statistics module, pixel maps, and a 3D view. It is developed and used by Austrian publisher Ed. Hölzel as atlas software for classrooms.

== See also ==
- Deep-Sky Planner
- List of software for astronomy research and education
- Shadows (software)
