= Stanislav George Djorgovski =

American scientist

Stanislav George Djorgovski (born 1956) is an American scientist and scholar. He obtained his B.A. in astrophysics in 1979 at the University of Belgrade. After receiving his PhD in astronomy from U.C. Berkeley in 1985, he was a Harvard Junior Fellow until 1987 when he joined the faculty at the California Institute of Technology, where he is currently a professor of astronomy and data science.

== Selected awards and recognitions ==
Prof. Djorgovski was an Alfred P. Sloan Foundation Fellow (1988–1991), a presidential young investigator (1991–1997), one of the ISI 1000 most cited physicists, 1981 – 1997, a visiting distinguished professor, Mexican Academy of Sciences (2004), and a distinguished visiting professor, King Abdulaziz University (2011–2012). He received the Dudley Observatory Award (1991), the NASA Group Achievement Award (1996), and won the First Prize in the Boeing-Griffith Science Writing Contest (2008). He was elected as a Fellow of the Institute for the Advancement of Engineering (2001), and as a Fellow of the American Association for Advancement of Science (2014). The asteroid 24421 Djorgovski is named in his honor. His Erdős number is 2.

== Contributions in astronomy and cosmology ==
Djorgovski has worked on numerous topics in astronomy and cosmology, including galaxy formation and evolution, fundamental properties of early-type galaxies, globular clusters, gravitational lenses, quasars, gamma-ray bursts, cosmological tests, large digital sky survey, exploration of the time domain in astronomy, etc. His publications include several hundred papers in professional journals and conferences and a large number of electronic publications. Some notable discoveries include: pioneering studies of radio galaxies beyond z > 1, including detections of strong evolutionary effects, alignment effects, and K-band Hubble diagram for radio galaxies (with H. Spinrad and others); discovery of collapsed cores in globular clusters, and the first census thereof (with I.R. King); systematic studies of the properties of globular clusters and their stellar populations (with G. Meylan, G. Piotto, and others); discovery of globular clusters Djorgovski 1 and Djorgovski 2; discovery of the first known galaxy at z > 3, pioneering use of Lyα narrow-band imaging for discoveries of high-z galaxies, and pioneering near-IR searches for protogalaxies (with various collaborators); discovery of the Fundamental plane (elliptical galaxies) correlations for elliptical galaxies (with M. Davis), and its use for systematic studies of fundamental properties, formation, and evolution of ellipticals (with R.R. de Carvalho and others); discoveries of the first examples of binary quasars, a systematic census of them, the first case of a triple quasar, and several tens of gravitational lenses; the first application of the Tolman test for the universal expansion (with M. Pahre); the first GRB redshift, demonstrating the cosmological nature of GRBs, and pioneering studies of GRB afterglows and host galaxies (with M. Metzger, S.R. Kulkarni, D. Frail, and others); pioneering exploration of the time domain with digital synoptic sky surveys (with A.A. Mahabal, M.J. Graham, A.J. Drake, C. Donalek, E. Glikman, and others). Prof. Djorgovski was the principal investigator of the Digital Palomar Observatory Sky Survey (DPOSS; 1992 – 2002); a Co-PI (with C. Baltay), Palomar-Quest synoptic sky survey (PQ, 2003 – 2008); and the PI, Catalina Real-Time Transient Survey (CRTS; 2008 – 2020).

== Contributions in e-science, data science and science informatics ==
Djorgovski is one of the founders of Virtual observatory. He organized the first international conference on the subject, chaired the US National Virtual Observatory Science Definition Team (NVO SDT) that generated the initial VO roadmap, and he was one of the founders of the International Virtual Observatory Alliance. With his team in the 1990s, he pioneered the uses of machine learning tools for analysis of large digital sky surveys. He has been one of the founders of the emerging field of AstroInformatics and he co-organized (with G. Longo and others) a series of the foundational conferences on the subject. He is the founding director of the Center for Data-Driven Discovery at Caltech. He was also the director of the Meta-Institute for Computational Astrophysics (MICA), the first professional scientific organization based in virtual worlds. He was the founding president of the International AstroInformatics Association, the first professional organization in this field.

== Teaching and outreach ==
Djorgovski teaches open online courses including: The Evolving Universe, hosted by the online learning platform edX, and Galaxies and Cosmology on Coursera. He also co-organized the first virtual summer school on Big Data Analytics. Materials used in the classes he taught at Caltech are linked through his website. With his team, Prof. Djorgovski produced the digital image of the Virgo cluster, displayed as the "Big Picture" mural at the Griffith Observatory, the largest astronomical image in the world, seen by millions of visitors so far. He also made contributions to the WorldWide Telescope sky browser.
