= NGC 1218 =

Galaxy in the constellation Cetus

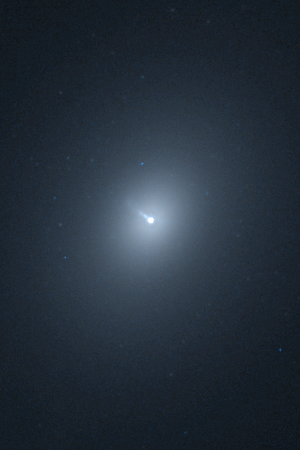
- NGC 1218 as viewed by the Hubble Space Telescope. (Note: Color rendered with the Aladin Sky Atlas)

Observation data (J2000.0 epoch)
- Constellation: Cetus
- Right ascension: 03^{h} 08^{m} 26.2^{s}
- Declination: +04° 06′ 39.3″
- Redshift: 0.0288
- Heliocentric radial velocity: 8,485±15 km/s
- Galactocentric velocity: 8,488±15 km/s
- Distance: 378,600,000 ly (116.08 Mpc)
- Group or cluster: [CHM 2007] LDC 223
- Apparent magnitude (V): 8.460
- Apparent magnitude (B): 12.84
- Absolute magnitude (V): -2.70
- Surface brightness: 1.19×10^{−1}

Characteristics
- Type: S0/a
- Size: 225,400 ly (69.11 kpc) (diameter)
- Apparent size (V): 1.147′ × 0.917′

Other designations
- 2MASS J03082623+0406390, 2MASX J03082624+0406388, Gaia DR1 2673462523030912, UGC 2555, LEDA 11749, MCG +01-09-001, PGC 011749, CGCG 0305.8+0355 (Note: There are a total of 76 identifiers used. The NGC, 3C, and CGCG designations are the most common)

NGC 1218 is a lenticular galaxy in Cetus that hosts the radio source 3C 78. It was discovered in 1886 by American astronomer Lewis A. Swift. It is located at l = 174.86, b = -44.51 in the galactic coordinate system.

== History ==
Discovered by Lewis Swift on September 6, 1886, NGC 1218 was one of the original objects included in the New General Catalogue. 3C 78 was discovered c. 1957, and subsequently included in the Third Cambridge Catalogue of Radio Sources (3C).

In 1982, it was found that the nucleus of NGC 1218 emits a radio jet. A follow-up study in 1986 corroborated the presence of the jet, as well as finding evidence of a possible weak counter-jet. The Hubble Space Telescope observed NGC 1218 on August 17, 1994. An optical jet of synchrotron radiation similar to that of Messier 87 was subsequently found.

On September 6, 2000, a type Ia supernova was detected in NGC 1218. A 2002 study found that the previously identified radio jet was the cause.

In 2023, the proper motion of 3C 78 was determined using observations from the Very Large Array (VLA), as well as a single observation from the Atacama Large Millimeter/submillimeter Array (ALMA).

== Composition and structure ==
NGC 1218 is a lenticular (S/0a) radio galaxy, with a radio halo roughly equivalent in size to the optical halo's extent. The observable synchrotron jet has a total length of 1.37 arcseconds (0.75 kpc), and expands substantially at 0.5 arcseconds from the nucleus.

NGC 1218 has an approximate hydrogen mass of <36×10^{9} M_{☉}.

=== 3C 78 ===
3C 78 is an astronomical radio source with an angular extent of approximately 80 × 55 arcseconds squared. According to Tabara and Inoue (1980), 3C 78 has a rotation measure of 8.7 ± 1.9 m^{−2} and an intrinsic position angle of 87° ± 4°, although Simard-Normandin, Kronberg, and Button (1981) claim that it has a rotation measure of 14 ± 2 m^{−2} and an intrinsic position angle of 85° ± 3°.

It possesses a radio jet approximately one arcsecond (0.58 kpc) in length, with three bright, compact inhomogeneities (or "knots"), with the second and thirds ones being the most prominent. The second knot has a longitudinal motion of approximately 0.51 ± 0.14c at roughly 200 pc, and the third knot had an apparent superluminal backwards motion of −2.6 ± 2c prior to 2000, followed by a forward motion of 0.5 ± 2c, both at roughly 300 pc.
