= Deep-Sky Planner =

- Developer(s): Knightware
- Initial release: 1 April 1994; 30 years ago
- Stable release: v9 / 14 June 2024; 9 months ago
- Operating system: Microsoft Windows
- Type: Astronomy software
- License: Proprietary software commercial software
- Website: knightware.biz

Deep-Sky Planner is observation planning and logging software for amateur astronomers. It helps observers to determine where and when to view all types of celestial objects. It runs on Windows.

Deep-Sky Planner was originally published April 1, 1994 by Sky Publishing Corporation. Knightware, LLC began publishing Deep-Sky Planner in 2005. Subsequent versions have been released to present.

Deep-Sky Planner received best astronomy product of the year awards in 2013 from Astronomy magazine and in 2014 from Sky & Telescope magazine. The software is developed and distributed by Knightware, LLC.

== Features ==
- Large database of celestial objects including the Revised New General Catalog & Index Catalog by Wolfgang Steinicke
- Search, sort, filter and report objects in the database
- Compute accurate planet, asteroid and comet positions
- Control GoTo telescopes via ASCOM
- Planetarium program inter-operation with:
  - TheSky (astronomy software)
  - Starry Night (planetarium software)
  - RedShift (planetarium software)
  - Cartes du Ciel
  - Stellarium (software)
- Integrated observing log that supports OpenAstronomyLog
- Insert readings from Unihedron's Sky Quality Meter into observing log
- Display and manage images from Digitized Sky Survey
- Online library of observing lists (plans)

== See also ==
- List of software for astronomy research and education
- Marble (software)
- Shadows (software)
