= Shadows (software) =

Shadows is a software package for the calculation and drawing of sundials and astrolabes, available as a freeware in its base level.

It has been developed by François Blateyron, software developer and amateur astronomer, who made it available on Internet since 1997 and continues to improve it. It is used worldwide by thousands of sundial enthusiasts. It is compatible with Windows 11/10, 8.x and 7. Shadows is available in three levels: Shadows is a freeware; Since version 3.0, it also supports the creation of astrolabes.

== Description ==
Shadows calculates various types of sundials:

- plane sundials with polar style (any orientation or reclination)
- horizontal or vertical analemmatic sundial
- horizontal or vertical bifilar sundial
- cylindrical sundial

as well as astrolabes:

- planispheric astrolabe
- universal astrolabe
- mariners astrolabe

The Shadows software is developed for the Windows operating system. It is simple to use but does not aim to be universal. It draws the sundial on screen and prints it to various scales to act as a template during fabrication. The sundials show solar time and can include longitude correction and equation of time. It also can draw ancient or unequal hours such as Italian and Babylonian and even draw azimuth and altitude curves. It has an animation feature so the shadow of the style can be simulated on the screen. The results can be copied as an image or a vector graphics (metafile or DXF) for use in CAD programs or machine tools.

In 2005, the French astronomical society, Société Astronomique de France (SAF) awarded Shadows with the Julien Saget prize for the Shadows software. In 2023, the North American Sundial Society (NASS) awarded Shadows with the Sayer Dialing Prize.

The astrolabes are interactive and can be manipulated on screen by rotating the Rete and the Alidade using the mouse.

Several curves and graphs are available: equation of time, solar graph with horizon mask, duration of the day, direction rose. It is translated in 18 languages (French, English, German, Spanish, Italian, Portuguese...)

=== Features of the three levels of Shadows ===
Shadows is supplied in three versions.

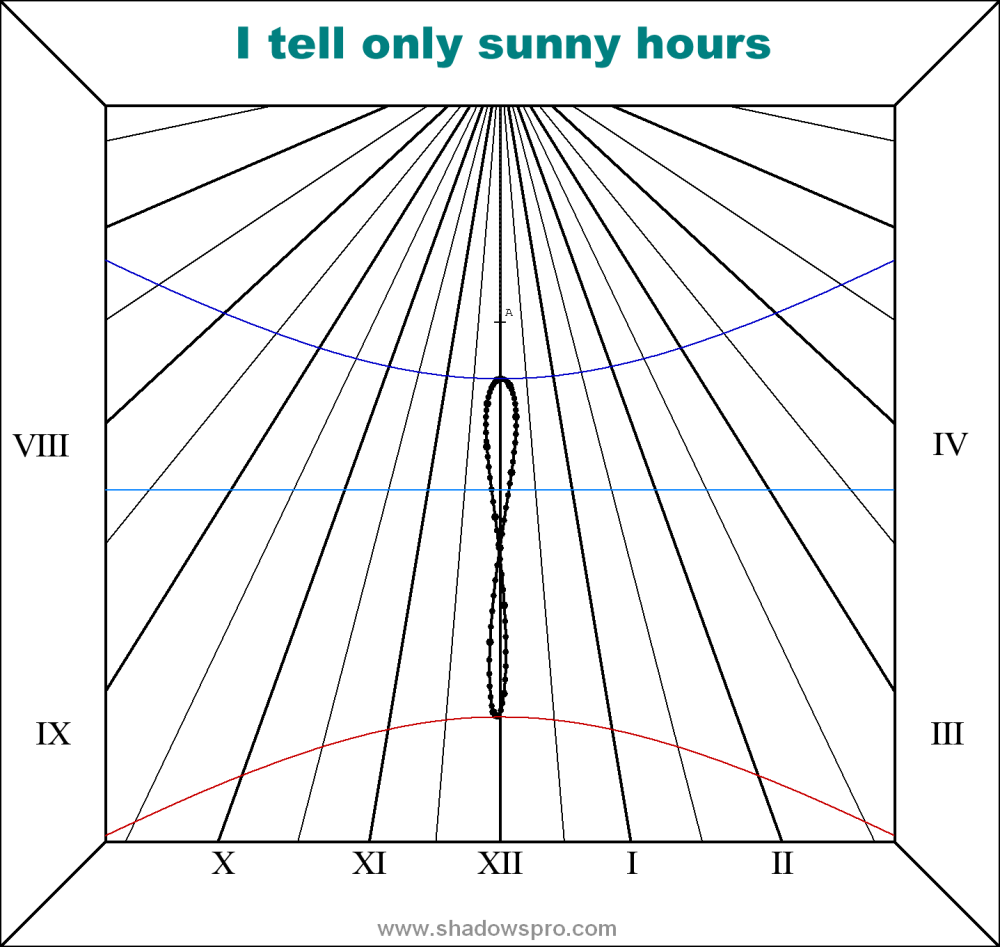
Vertical sundial drawn by Shadows.

Shadows: Freeware version

- Plane sundials with polar style (horizontal, vertical declining, equatorial, polar, meridian dial)
- Drawing of the sundial to scale 1; Any dimension, orientation or reclination
- Suitable for any location on Earth, on northern or southern hemisphere (6000+ locations pre-installed)
- Drawing of the style to scale 1, ready to be cut out
- Tables of coordinates of hour lines and declination lines
- Drawing of declination arcs and hour lines (solar or mean time), with or without longitude correction
- Moveable, resizable text frames, with list of pre-installed mottoes
- Drawing of the curve of equation of time, in various shapes
- Drawing of compass and azimuth circle
- Full on-line help, user interface translated into 18 languages.

Shadows Expert: Intermediate version, shareware

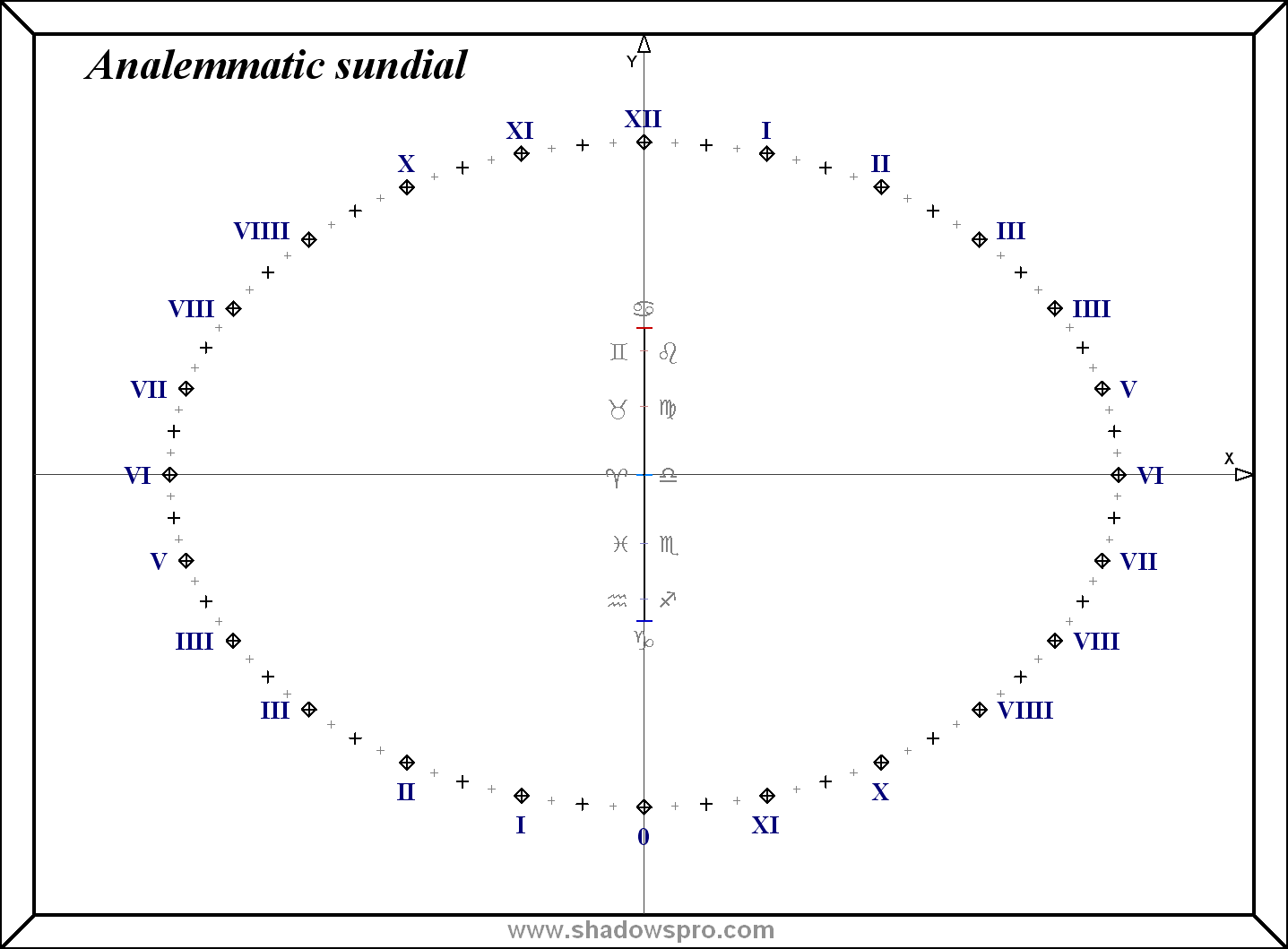
Analemmatic sundial drawn by Shadows Expert.

(in addition to standard Shadows features)

- Declining-reclining plane sundials
- Analemmatic sundials
- Cylindrical sundials (shepherd's dial, armillary sphere, ...)
- Tables of solar and astronomical ephemeris
- Drawing of Italian and Babylonian hours
- Insertion of images for decoration
- Export of data and images
- Drawing of the construction layout (epure)
- Simulation of the shadow cast by a roof
- Animation in orientation and reclination of the sundial
- Tool for the calculation of the wall orientation
- Direction rose
- Mariners astrolabe

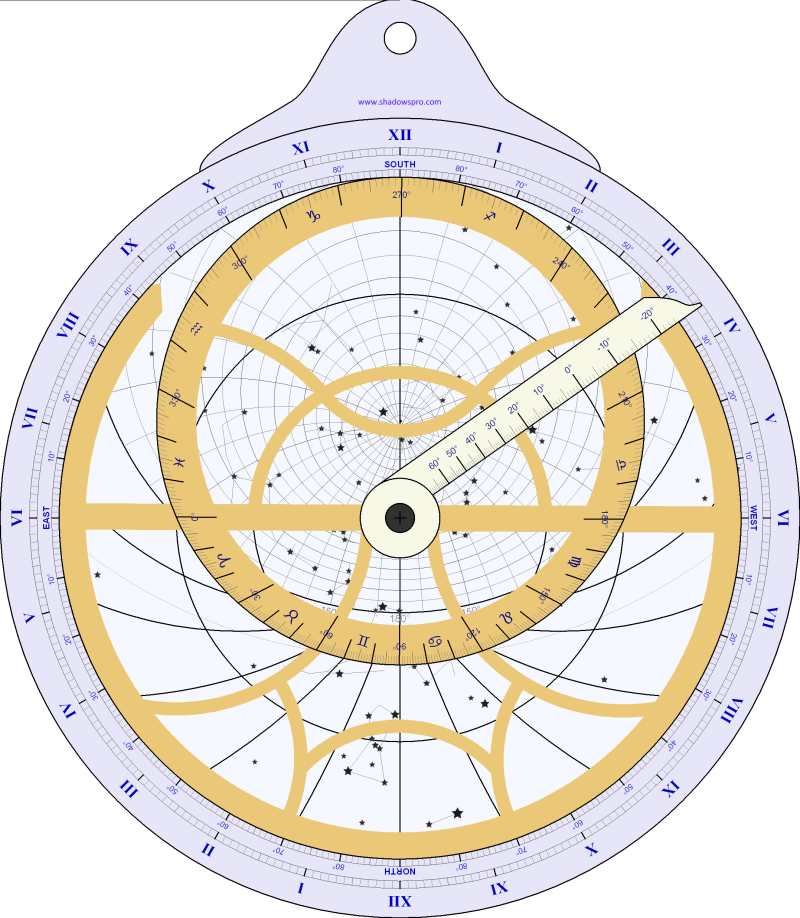
Planispheric astrolabe drawn by Shadows Pro.

Shadows Pro: Full version, shareware

(in addition to Shadows Expert features)

- Planispheric and universal astrolabes
- vertical declining analemmatic sundial
- Bifilar sundials
- Drawings in azimuth and altitude
- Sidereal hours, unequal hours
- Animated 3D view of sundials
- 3D view of multiple sundials
- Solar graph with horizon mask
- Export of drawings in WMF and DXF (AutoCAD)
- Export of animations in AVI
- Tool for the calculation of sundial parameters from a photograph
- Efficiency graph of a solar panel

== History of versions ==
- Version 5.2 (November 2024)
- Version 5.1 (December 2023)
- version 5.0 (March 2022)
- version 4.5 (June 2020)
- version 4.4 (August 2019)
- version 4.3 (May 2019)
- version 4.2 (October 2018)
- version 4.1 (November 2016)
- version 4.0 (June 2014)
- version 3.5 (August 2012)
- version 3.4 (November 2011)
- version 3.3 (December 2010)
- version 3.2 (January 2010)
- version 3.1 (July 2009)
- version 3.0 (May 2008)
- version 2.2 (January 2006)
- version 2.1 (January 2005)
- version 2.0 (March 2004)
- version 1.6 (January 2001)
- version 1.5 (February 1999)
- version 1.0 (September 1997)

== See also ==
- Deep-Sky Planner
- List of software for astronomy research and education
- Scottish sundial
