= Astrophysical Virtual Observatory =

AVO Logo

The Astrophysical Virtual Observatory (AVO) project conducted a research and demonstration programme on the scientific requirements and technologies necessary to build a virtual observatory for European astronomy. The AVO has been jointly funded by the European Commission (under FP5 - Fifth Framework Programme) with six European organisations participating in a three-year Phase-A work programme, valued at 5 million euro. The partner organisations were the European Southern Observatory (ESO) in Munich, Germany, the European Space Agency (ESA), AstroGrid (funded by PPARC as part of the UK's E-Science programme), the CNRS-supported Centre de Données Astronomiques de Strasbourg (CDS), the University Louis Pasteur in Strasbourg, France, the CNRS-supported TERAPIX astronomical data centre at the Institut d'Astrophysique in Paris, France, and the Jodrell Bank Observatory of the Victoria University of Manchester, United Kingdom.

The Phase A program focussed its effort in the following areas:

- A detailed description of the science requirements for the AVO was constructed, following the experience gained in a smaller-scale science demonstration program called ASTROVIRTEL (Accessing Astronomical Archives as Virtual Telescopes).
- The difficult issue of data and archive interoperability was addressed by new standards definitions for astronomical data and trial programmes of "joins" between specific target archives within the project team.
- The necessary GRID and database technologies were assessed and tested for use within a full AVO implementation.
