= TOPCAT (software) =

Graphical viewer of tabular data mainly used in astronomical applications

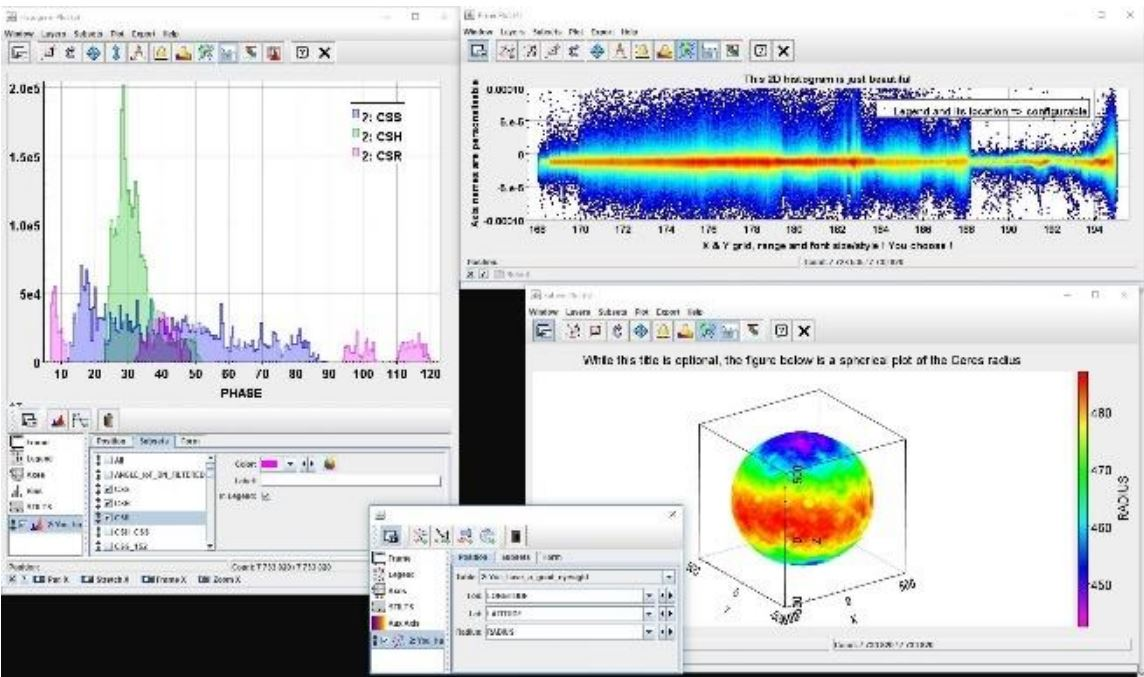
- Screenshots of TOPCAT
- Original author: Mark Taylor
- Release: 4 June 2003; 23 years ago
- Stable release: 4.7-2 / 24 August 2020; 6 years ago
- Written in: Java
- Included with: Debian Astro
- Type: Graph plotting software
- License: GPL / LGPL
- Website: www.star.bris.ac.uk/~mbt/topcat/
- As of: 24 August 2020

TOPCAT is an interactive graphical viewer and editor for tabular data. Although a general purpose tool capable of handling large and sparse datasets with correlation functionality its specialist application area is astronomy and it was initially designed to support virtual observatories. It is able to handle several digital file formats including FITS which is in common use in astronomy. The Acronym TOPCAT derives from Tool for OPerations on Catalogues And Tables.

== History ==
The project was initially developed by Mark Taylor, an astrophysicist from the University of Bristol in 2003. Taylor acknowledges inspiration for some features from Mirage from Bell Labs and VOPlot from VO-India. Initially funded from the Starlink Project it has been funded by various other projects since.

== Features ==
Written in Java, TOPCAT can be used both standalone and within a web browser. It is suitable for use as a graphical viewer and data editor of tabular data from FITS and other sources. Muna, in his 2016 paper "Introducing Nightlight: A New FITS Viewer", observes that SAOImage DS9, TOPCAT and Fv are the most common tools used to view FITS files. VisIVO is an alternative tool for working with virtual observatories.

While TOPCAT is unable to visualise catalogues as a set of vectors it does have capabilities to explore correlations in two and three dimensional scatter plots.

=== STILTS ===
The STILTS application complements TOPCAT with similar capabilities but is considered a steeper learning curve, however STILTS does have the advantage of being able to be scripted.

=== Applications ===
TOPCAT is used in training for use of virtual observatories, including access via the Astronomical Data Query Language (ADQL). Applications using TOPCAT include MultiDark, a database for results from cosmological simulations.

== Sources ==
- Campbell-White, Justyn (2019). "Virtual Observatory Tools for Astronomers". University of Kent. Archived from the original on 15 April 2019.
- Comparato, M.; Becciani, U.; Costa, A.; Larsson, B.; et al. (August 2007). "Visualization, Exploration, and Data Analysis of Complex Astrophysical Data". Publications of the Astronomical Society of the Pacific. 119 (858). Astronomical Society of the Pacific: 898–913. arXiv:0707.2474. Bibcode:2007PASP..119..898C. doi:10.1086/521375. JSTOR 10.1086/521375.
- Muna, Demitri (17 April 2017). "Introducing Nightlight: A New FITS Viewer". Publications of the Astronomical Society of the Pacific. 129 (975) 058003. Astronomical Society of the Pacific. Bibcode:2017PASP..129e8003M. doi:10.1088/1538-3873/129/975/058003. 1. Motivation.
- Parsons, H. A. L.; Berry, D. S.; Rawlings, M. G.; Graves, S. F. (21 February 2018). "The POL-2 Data Reduction Cookbook 1.0" (PDF). East Asian Observatory. 5.3 TOPCAT. Archived (PDF) from the original on 6 May 2019.
- Partl, Adrian M. (2012). "Data Mining of the MultiDark Simulation". In Sarro L.; Eyer L.; O'Mullane W.; De Ridder J. (eds.). Astrostatistics and Data Mining. Springer Series in Astrostatistics. Vol. 2. Springer, New York, NY. pp. 209–211. Bibcode:2012adm..book..209P. doi:10.1007/978-1-4614-3323-1_21. ISBN 978-1-4614-3323-1 – via Google Books.
- Pössel, Markus (2020). "A Beginner's Guide to Working with Astronomical Data". The Open Journal of Astrophysics. 3 (1): 2. arXiv:1905.13189v1. Bibcode:2020OJAp....3E...2P. doi:10.21105/astro.1905.13189. S2CID 170079000.
- Rousseau, Batiste; Érard, Stéphane (15 September 2019). "Using TOPCAT with sparse measurements on planetary surfaces" (PDF). ESPC Abstracts. EPSC-DPS2019-514-1, 2019. Archived (PDF) from the original on 5 November 2019.
- Solano, E. (December 2017). "Advanced TOPCAT-STILTS" (PDF). Spanish Virtual Observatory. Archived from the original (PDF) on 6 May 2019.
- Steeghs, Danny; Wheatley, Peter (15 November 2013). "TOPCAT & STIL(TS)" (PDF). The University of Warwick. Archived from the original (PDF) on 5 November 2019.
- Taylor, Mark (27 June 2017). "TOPCAT: Desktop Exploration of Tabular Data for Astronomy and Beyond". Informatics. 4 (3). MDPI: 18. arXiv:1707.02160. Bibcode:2017arXiv170702160T. doi:10.3390/informatics4030018.
- —— (2019). "TOPCAT Tutorial" (PDF). German Astrophysical Virtual Observatory. Archived from the original (PDF) on 6 May 2019.
