= Space Physics Archive Search and Extract =

The Space Physics Archive Search and Extract (SPASE) effort is an international consortium formed in 2001. Its mission is to define standards and services to enable the establishment and operation of discipline specific Virtual Observatories. The main focus of the consortium is to define and maintain a standard data model to enable data sharing and interoperability within the Space and Solar Physics community. Another goal of the consortium is to facilitate data search and retrieval across the Space and Solar Physics data environment by providing conventions, tools and services to assist data providers, researchers and general users. The SPASE consortium also encourages collaboration between agencies and groups interested in sharing space and solar physics data.

== Membership ==
Membership in the SPASE consortium is open to any individual or agency. The consortium meets by telecon every two weeks to discuss and vote on changes to the data model, conventions and to endorse compliant tools and services. Face-to-face meetings typically occur in conjunction with related science meetings.

There are many individuals who are members of the SPASE consortium with a diverse range of science and agency interests. Participants in the SPASE consortium represent interested groups from NASA, NOAA, JAXA, ESA, CNES and a variety of research institutions.

Systems that have adopted the SPASE standards or use SPASE compliant services can display a "SPASE" logo on their pages.

== Projects Using SPASE ==
- CDPP is using the SPASE standard in its tools.
- IUGONET is using the SPASE standard in its tools.
- IMPEx has adapted the SPASE standard to describe simulation runs.
