= Center for Data-Driven Discovery =

The Center for Data-Driven Discovery is a multi-division research group at the California Institute of Technology, focusing on the methodologies for handling and analysis of large and complex data sets, facilitating the data-to-discovery process. It supports all applications of data-driven computing in various scientific domains, including biology, physics, and astronomy. It also functions as a catalyst for new collaborations and projects between different scientific disciplines, and between the campus and JPL, with especial interest in the sharing and transfer of methodologies, where the solutions from one field can be reapplied in another one.

The Center for Data-Driven Discovery is a part of a joint initiative with the Center for Data Science and Technology at the Jet Propulsion Laboratory. It became operational in the fall of 2014.

== Directors ==
- Stanislav George Djorgovski (2014 – present)
