= Jardin botanique de l'Université de Strasbourg =

Botanical garden and arboretum in Alsace, France

Coordinates: 48°35′01″N 7°46′00″E

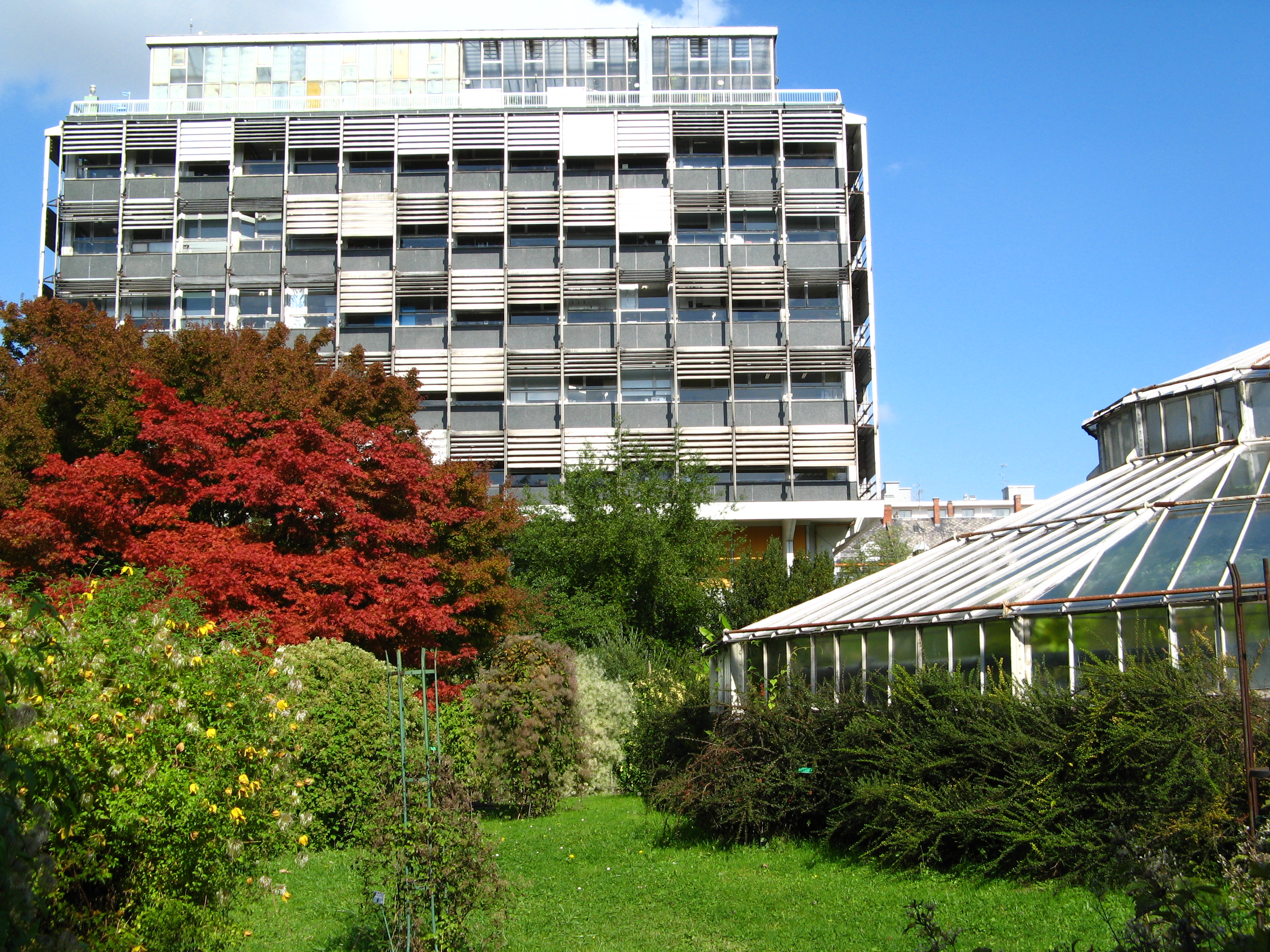
Jardin Botanique de l'Université de Strasbourg

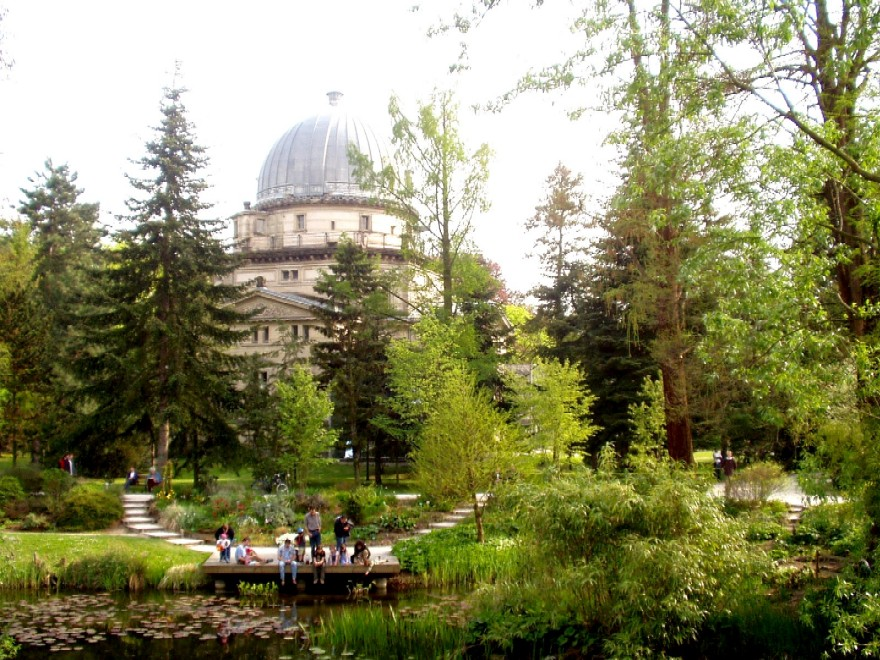
Jardin botanique with Observatory of Strasbourg

The Jardin Botanique de l'Université de Strasbourg (3.5 hectares), also known as the Jardin botanique de Strasbourg and the Jardin botanique de l'Université Louis Pasteur, is a botanical garden and arboretum located at 28 rue Goethe, Strasbourg, Bas-Rhin, Alsace, France. It is open daily without charge.

== History ==
The garden was established in 1619 for the city's Académie (which in 1621 became the university) and is thus the second oldest botanical garden in France after that of Montpellier. It was created on the cemetery grounds of the convent Saint-Nicolas-aux-Ondes. This first site was then known as the Krutenau (plain of cabbage), and is now the Place de l'Ecole des Arts Decoratifs. This early garden was kept by the faculty of medicine. Its first inventory, published in 1670 by Marcus Mappus, listed some 1600 species. The entire university was suppressed in 1792 after the French Revolution, but the garden's director, Jean Hermann, managed to preserve not just the garden itself but also the statues of the Strasbourg Cathedral, which he buried within the garden.

In 1870 with the German army besieging Strasbourg, the garden again became an informal cemetery, and in 1871 the territory became a part of Germany. In 1880 Wilhelm II, German Emperor, began reconstruction of the Université Impériale as a scientific and cultural showcase, creating eight new institutes, the observatory and zoological museum, and today's botanical garden located on a new site, formerly the old city walls, under the leadership of botanist Heinrich Anton de Bary. The garden and its magnificent greenhouses were inaugurated in 1884.

In 1919 the garden reverted to French territory after World War I. Most of its greenhouses were destroyed by hail in 1958, and only the Bary Greenhouse, a work by Hermann Eggert, the architect of the Palais du Rhin, was saved from demolition in 1963. Newer greenhouses were built in 1967.

== Features ==
Today the garden contains about 15,000 specimens representing more than 6,000 species of plants, and is operated by the University of Strasbourg (formerly the Université Louis Pasteur). It consists of 9 plots surrounding the Institute of Botany: an arboretum, tropical greenhouse, cold greenhouse, the Bary Greenhouse, a greenhouse of grasses, a pond, the systematic garden, ecological plantings, and useful plants.

== See also ==
- Jardin botanique du col de Saverne
- List of botanical gardens in France
