= Otto Tetens =

Otto Tetens (left) with Mataafa in Mulinuu, Samoa 1904

Otto Tetens (26 September 1865, Rendsburg, Kingdom of Prussia – 15 February 1945, Teplitz-Schönau) was a German natural scientist with an astronomy background.

== Life ==
Tetens was the son of a high ranked police officer in Schleswig, Northern Germany. He went to several universities for different natural science topics in Tübingen, Munich, Berlin and Kiel. After this period, he worked at the private astronomy observatory of Miklos Konkly-Thege in Ogyalla in Hungary. In 1891 he got his Doctor degree of Natural Science. He then worked at different institutes in astronomy such as the Deutsche Seewarte, Hamburg, and the Observatory of Strasbourg.

From 1902 to 1905 Otto Tetens worked for the Royal Society of Science of Göttingen on a climate project in Samoa, then a German colony. He founded the Apia Observatory in June 1902 at Mulinuu near the main town of Apia. After his time in Samoa, he went back to Germany and Göttingen to work on his reports for the previous three years and then took an occupation at the Royal Astronomy Observatory in Kiel, Germany.

From 1909 to 1931 Tetens worked at the meteorological observatory in Lindenberg, Germany (south-east of Berlin) as chief-observer. After retirement he moved to Bad Saarow, some 10 km away from Lindenberg and lived at his house in Seestrasse at the Lake Scharmützelsee.

He died in 1945 while staying at a sanatorium in Teplitz-Schönau. His wife Dorothee Heimrod, daughter of the Council of the United States in Samoa and later Switzerland, moved back to the USA in 1947 and died 1962 in New York City.

== Photography by Otto Tetens ==
During his time in Samoa, Otto Tetens took photos of his experiences and the locals. These photos were exhibited in Germany and Samoa in 2004 and 2005.

The photo with the paramount chief Josefo Mataafa shows the way Otto Tetens was living in Samoa: as a partner on the same level, with strong adoption of Samoan culture and habits. His houses for work and living at the Mulinuu observatory were built as Samoan fales, not as German wood houses. The photo was taken in 1904 by Otto Tetens.
