= Observatory of Strasbourg =

Astronomical observatory in Grand Est, France

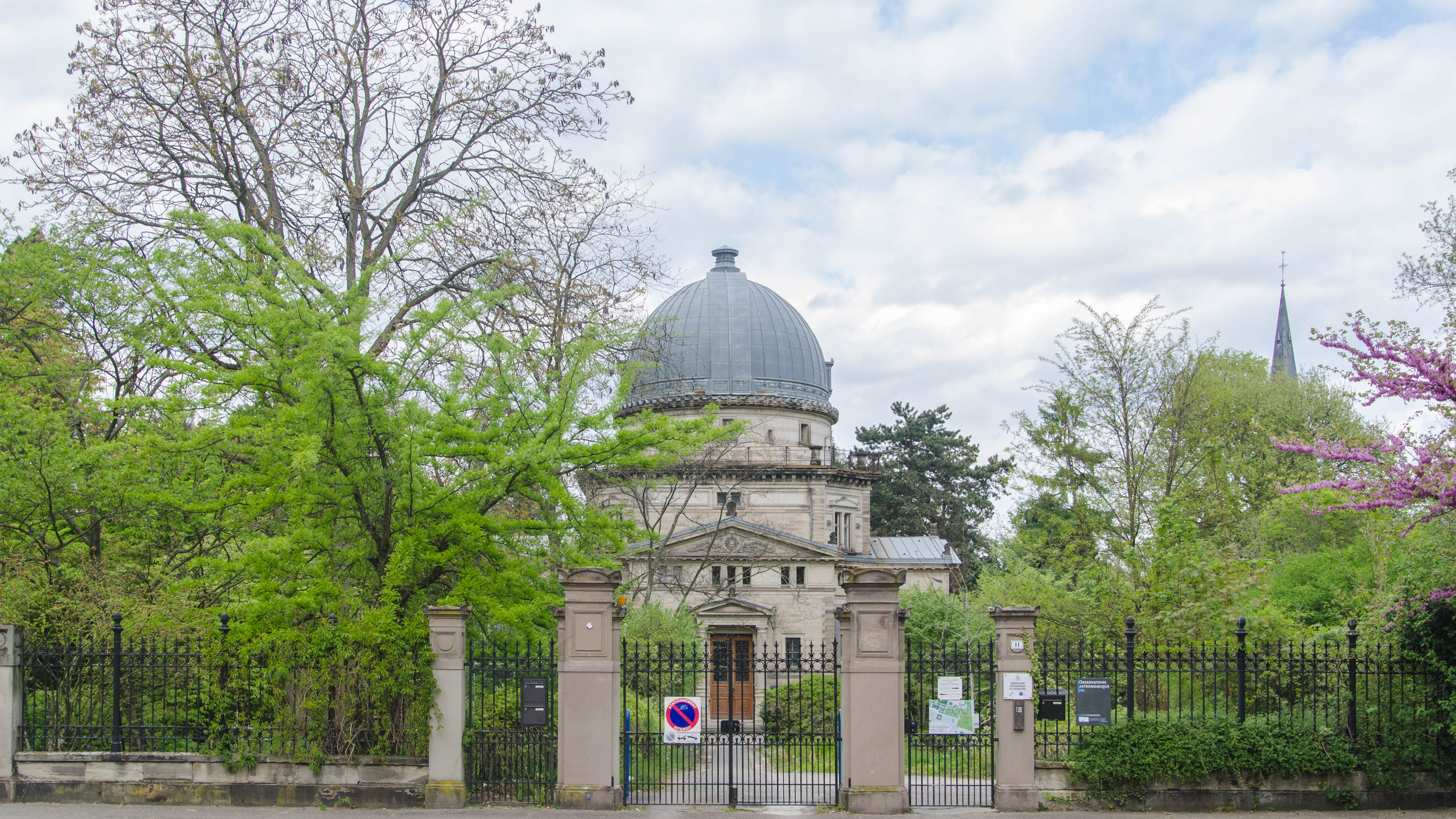
- Observatory and botanical garden in Strasbourg
- Alternative names: OAS
- Organization: University of Strasbourg
- Observatory code: 522
- Location: Strasbourg, France
- Coordinates: 48°35′0″N 7°46′5″E
- Altitude: 142 m (466 ft)
- Established: 1881
- Website: astro.unistra.fr/en/
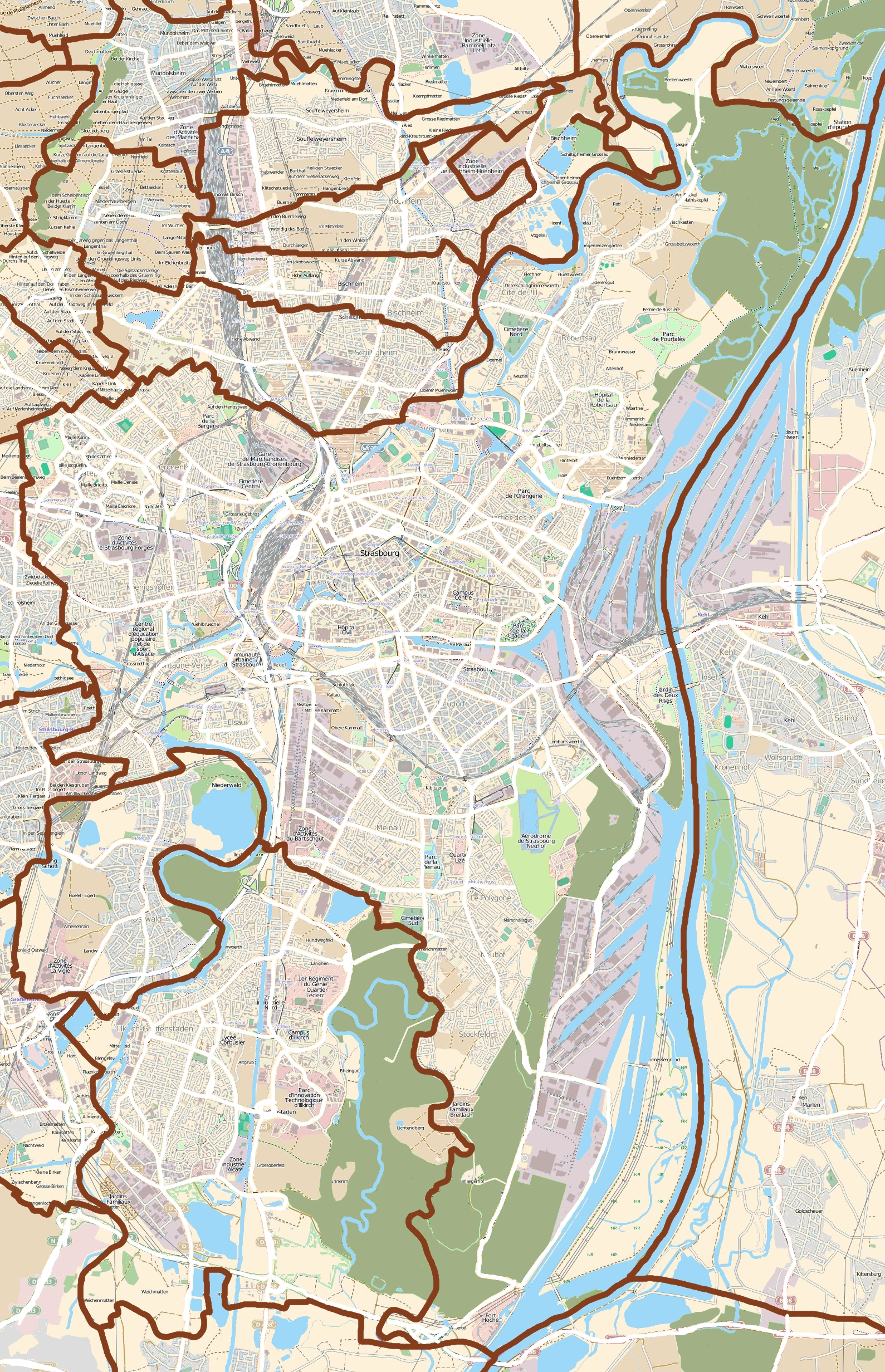
- Location within Strasbourg
- Related media on Commons

The Observatory of Strasbourg is an astronomical observatory in Strasbourg, France.

== History ==
This observatory is actually Strasbourg's third observatory: the first was built in 1673 on one of the city's surrounding towers (the astronomer Julius Reichelt notably played a role in its establishment), and the second in 1828 on the roof of the buildings of the Academy.

Following the Franco-Prussian War of 1870–1871, the city of Strasbourg became part of the German Empire. The University of Strasbourg was refounded in 1872, and a new observatory began construction in 1875, in the Neustadt district. The main instrument was a 50 cm Repsold refractor, which saw first light in 1880 (see Great refractor). At the time this was the largest instrument in the German Empire. In 1881, the ninth General Assembly of the Astronomische Gesellschaft met in Strasbourg to mark the official inauguration.

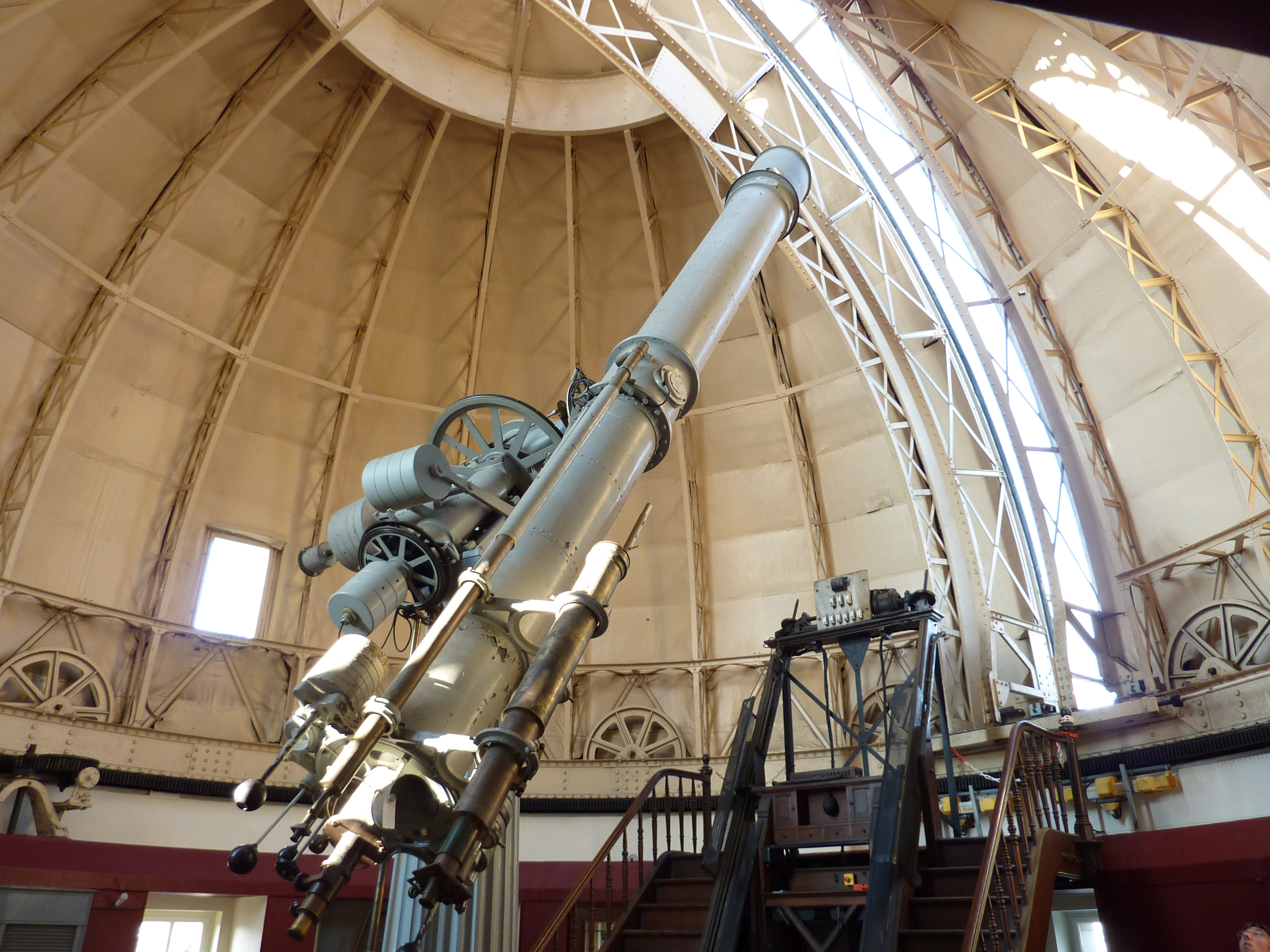
The refracting telescope inside the dome

The observatory site was selected primarily for instruction purposes and political symbolism, rather than the observational qualities. It was a low-lying site that was prone to mists. During the period up until 1914, the staff was too small to work the instruments and so there was little academic research published prior to World War I. The main observations were of comets and variable stars. After 1909, the instruments were also used to observe binary stars and perform photometry of nebulae.

The observatory is currently the home for the Centre de données astronomiques de Strasbourg, a database for the collection and distribution of astronomical information. This includes SIMBAD, a reference database for astronomical objects, VizieR, an astronomical catalogue service and Aladin, an interactive sky atlas. The modern extension of the building used to house the Planétarium de Strasbourg until 2023, and the opening of a larger and more modern planetarium in the vicinity. The observatory is surrounded by the Jardin botanique de l'Université de Strasbourg. In the vaulted basement below the observatory, a university-administered museum is located. Called Crypte aux étoiles ("star crypt"), it displays old telescopes and other antique astronomical devices such as clocks and theodolites.

== Notable astronomers ==
- Agnès Acker
- Julius Bauschinger
- Adolf Berberich
- André Danjon
- William Lewis Elkin
- Ernest Esclangon
- Ernst Hartwig
- Carlos Jaschek
- Pierre Lacroute
- Otto Tetens
- Friedrich Winnecke
- Carl Wilhelm Wirtz
- Walter Wislicenus
- Rodrigo Ibata

== See also ==
- List of astronomical observatories
