= Agnès Acker =

French astrophysicist and astronomer

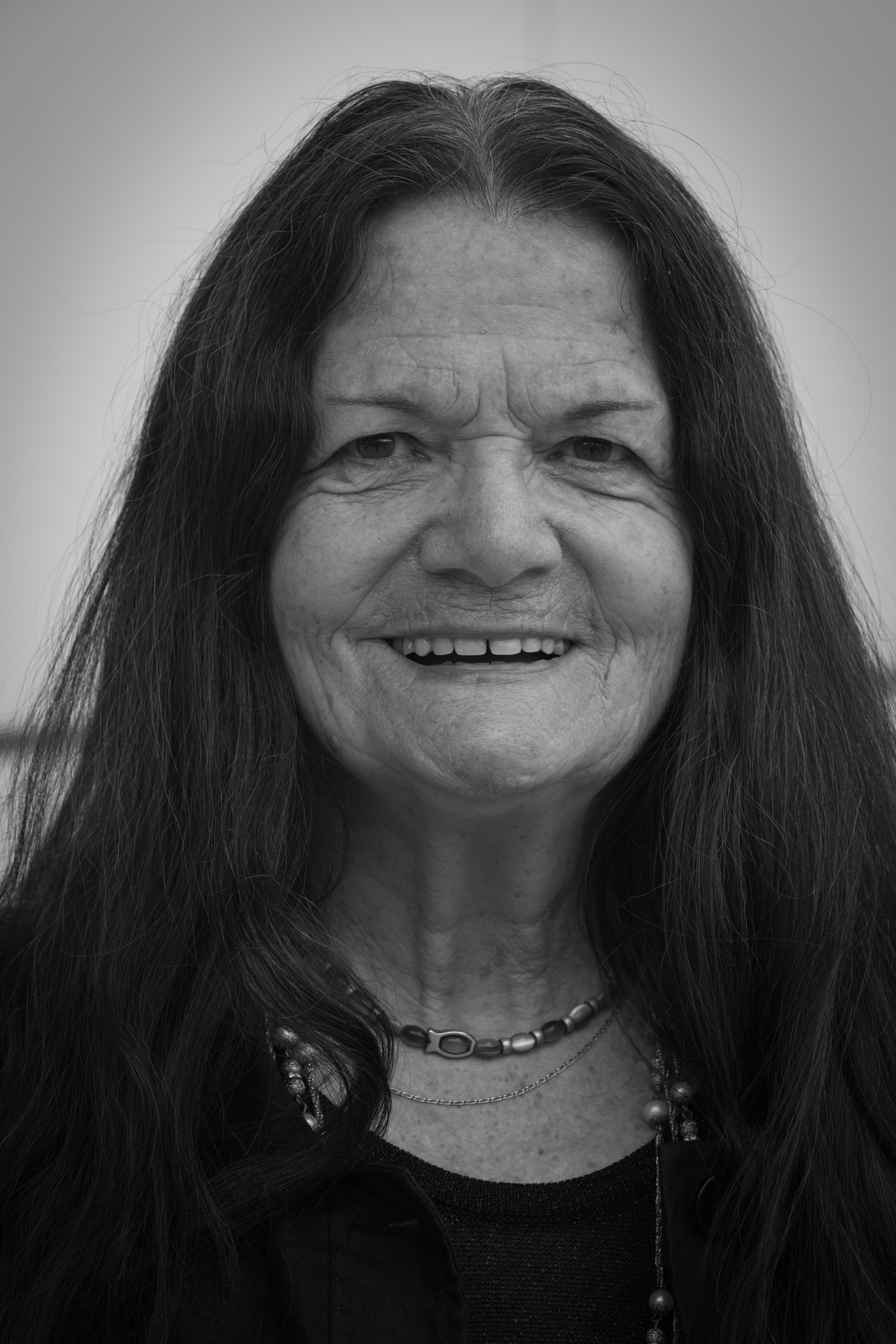
- Born: 28 January 1940 (age 86); Sentheim, Haut-Rhin, France
- Education: University of Strasbourg
- Awards: Commander of Ordre des Palmes académiques (1999); Chevalier of the Legion of Honour (2012)
- Scientific career
- Fields: Astrophysics
- Workplaces: University of Strasbourg; Observatory of Strasbourg

Agnès Acker, née Keller, (born 28 January 1940 in Thann, Haut-Rhin) is a French astrophysicist, professor emeritus of the University of Strasbourg, founder of the Strasbourg Planetarium and founding president of the Association of French-speaking Planetaries (APLF). Her research focuses on the late stages of solar-type star evolution: planetary nebulae, binarity of nuclei, stellar winds.

== Biography ==
Acker holds a State Doctorate from 1976 at the University of Strasbourg under the title Cinématique, âge et binarité des noyaux de nébuleuses planétaires.

She founded the Strasbourg Planetarium, which she directed for 22 years (1979-2001), the Association of French-speaking Planetaries (APLF) which she chaired for 26 years (1984-2010), the "Stellar Populations" research team for which she was responsible for 10 years (1987-1997), and earned a Diploma of Advanced Studies (DEA) in astrophysics at the Observatory of Strasbourg which she directed for 12 years (1991-2002).

A university professor, she was promoted to the exceptional class in 2003, then to the emeritus in 2009.

Acker also held responsibilities in various organizations and was a member of the National Steering Committee of the International Year of Astronomy (AMA09), creator and co-chair of BEATEP, Member of the International Astronomical Union (IAU) since 1976, Board Member of the International Planetarium Society (IPS) since 1990, member of the Scientific and Pedagogical Council of Le Vaisseau, CCSTI Strasbourg, from 2004 to 2009, elected member of the Council of Teachers and Astronomers Liaison Committee (CLEA) since 1990, director of the Science Garden, CCSTI of Louis Pasteur University from 1991 to 1994, elected member of the National Council Universities (CNU) from 1987 to 1991 and member of the Regional Economic and Social Council of Alsace (CÉSER Alsace) from 1995 to 2001.

In the specific field of planetaria, Acker has been project manager of several European Planetarium shows in APLF / ESO partnership: Les mystères du ciel austral (2002), ALMA : la quête de nos origines cosmiques (2009), L'eau : une aventure cosmique (2012). Between 1982 and 2008, she was the author and scriptwriter of twelve planetarium shows. In 2005 she produced a trilingual version of the CD-ROM Explore the Universe , created by the University of California ( Hands-On Universe ). Since 1995, she has been the director of publication of the magazine Planétariums. She is also the founder (1984) and the director of the "Planetarium" collection of the Strasbourg Observatory.

Agnès Acker was married to Robert Acker (1940 – 4 Dezember 2022). The couple had five children, Nathalie, Madeleine, Pierre, Elisabeth und Jean-Michel, and 9 grandchildren. She was a fan of motorcycle sport and rode a Hornet 600 (95 CV).

== Selected publications ==
Acker is the author or co-author of more than 200 articles in international astrophysics journals and many educational and scientific publications.

- Initiation à l'astronomie, Masson 1978, 1981, 1986
- Astronomie, astrophysique. Introduction, Dunod, 1992, 1995, 1998, 2005, 2013
- Formes et couleurs dans l'univers : nébuleuses, amas d'étoiles, galaxie, Masson, 1987
- Le planétarium : un spectacle nouveau dans votre ville, Valblor, 1991
- Astronomie : méthodes et calculs : exercices corrigés (in coll. with Carlos Jaschek), Masson, 1984, 1995
- Vie et mort des étoiles : un exposé pour comprendre, un essai pour réfléchir (in collab. with Ariane Lançon), Flammarion, Dominos, 1998
- L'univers astronomique (in coll. with Jean-Claude Pecker), Observatoire de Strasbourg, 2001, 2006
- Étoiles et matière interstellaire (in coll. with James Lequeux, Claude Bertout, Jean-Paul Zahn, Nicolas Prantzos and Jean-Pierre Lasota), Ellipses, 2008, 2009
- L’Arc-en-ciel des étoiles (dir.), APLF/Observatoire de Strasbourg, 2010 (educational booklet)
