= Centre de données astronomiques de Strasbourg =

French astronomical data center

The Centre de données astronomiques de Strasbourg (CDS; English translation: Strasbourg Astronomical Data Centre) is a data centre which collects and distributes astronomical information. It was established in 1972 under the name Centre de Données Stellaires by the National Institute of Astronomy and Geophysics (INAG).

== Online services ==
The on-line services currently provided by the CDS include:

- SIMBAD, a database of astronomical objects. It is the main service for the identification and bibliography of astronomical objects, vizier, which collects astronomical catalogs and tables published in academic newspapers, and Aladdin, an interactive atlas of the sky that allows to visualize astronomical images from the soil and spatial observatories or supplied by the user, and data from CDS services or other databases such as NED.
- VizieR, a service for astronomical catalogues and data associated with publications.
- Aladin, an interactive sky atlas and image database.
- X-Match, a catalogue cross-matching service.

This is one of the actors of the International Virtual Observatory Alliance (IVOA), which develops the necessary standards to ensure the interoperability of archives and astronomical services.

== Mission ==
The CDS mission is to:

- collect useful information concerning astronomical objects that is available in computerized form;
- upgrade these data by critical evaluations and comparisons;
- distribute the results to the astronomical community;
- conduct research, using these data.

On November 27, 2010, 9,591 catalogs were available via CDS, including:

- 8 971 available online (as ASCII or FITS files)
- 8 608 available through the Vizier service.

== See also ==
- Observatory of Strasbourg
