= Astronomical Data Query Language =

Query language for astronomical data

- Stable release: 2.0 / 30 October 2008; 17 years ago

Influenced by
- SQL

Astronomical Data Query Language (ADQL) is a language for astronomical data query based on SQL 92.

== Overview ==
ADQL is a specialized variant of the SQL query language adapted for accessing the astronomical datasets of the virtual observatory, via the Table access protocol (TAP). ADQL is designed to handle large datasets distributed over several locations, while not retrieving data that is not needed.

== Language ==
ADQL is a query language that allows data to be retrieved via a single command, the select statement, which is designed to perform as the select statement in the SQL language. ADQL has extensions designed to improve handling of astronomical data such as spherical co-ordinates that are not handled by standard SQL.

== Implementations ==
ADQL is implemented in packages such as TOPCAT.

== Example ==
SELECT source_id, ra, dec
FROM gaiadr1.tgas_source
WHERE phot_g_mean_flux > 13
