= List of software for astronomy research and education =

Listed here are software packages useful for conducting scientific research in astronomy, and for seeing, exploring, and learning about the data used in astronomy.

Package Name	Pro Am	Interface	Connects to Online (e.g. VO) Data	Displays or Manip. FITS Images	Tiled Multi-Resolution All-Sky image Handling	Displays or Manip. Spectra	Handles Cubes (Volumes)	Statistics?	OS	Has API	Cost	Suppt'd or Sold by	website	Currently Supported?
glue	Pro	GUI and command line	Yes	Manipulates	No	Yes	Yes	Basic, plus python terminal	Mac, Win, Linux	Yes	Free	NASA (JWST), NSF	http://glueviz.org	Yes
GNU Astronomy Utilities (Gnuastro)	Pro	Command-line	Yes	Manipulates	No	No	Yes	Yes	Linux, Mac	Yes	Free	GNU, AEI, CEFCA, ARRAKIHS, IAC	https://gnu.org/software/gnuastro	Yes
WorldWide Telescope	Pro/Am	GUI	Yes	Displays	TOAST	No	Limited	Limited (histograms)	Browser	Yes	Free	American Astronomical Society (originally by Microsoft)	http://worldwidetelescope.org/webclient	Yes
Google Sky	Am	GUI	Yes	Displays	Mercator	No	No	No	Browser	Yes	Free	Google	https://www.google.com/sky/	No
IRAF	Pro	GUI and command line	Yes	Display & Manipulates	No	Yes	Yes	Limited	Mac, Linux	Yes	Free	NOAO	https://iraf-community.github.io	Yes
ds9	Pro	GUI	Yes	Manipulates	No	Yes	Limited	Limited	Mac, Win, Linux	No	Free	NASA	http://ds9.si.edu/site/Home.html	Yes
js9	Pro	GUI	Yes	Manipulates	No	Yes	No	Limited	Browser	No		NASA	https://js9.si.edu	Yes
Aladin	Pro	GUI and command line	Yes	Displays & Manipulates	HiPS	No	Yes	Limited (histograms)	Mac, Win, Linux	yes (java plugins)	Free	CDS	https://aladin.u-strasbg.fr/Desktop	Yes
Aladin Lite	Pro/Am	GUI	Yes	Displays	HiPS	No	No	No	Browser	Yes	Free	CDS	http://aladin.u-strasbg.fr/AladinLite/	Yes
ESASky	Pro/Am	GUI	Yes	Displays	HiPS	No	No	No	Browser	No	Free	ESA	http://sky.esa.int	Yes
Starry Night	Am	GUI	No?	No	Yes	No	No	No	Mac, Win	No	$	Simulation Curriculum Corp	http://www.starrynight.com/starry-night-7-professional-astronomy-telescope-control-software.html	Yes
Legacy Survey Sky Browser	Pro/Am	GUI	Yes	Displays	Yes	No	No	No	Browser	No	Free	NOAO, AURA	http://legacysurvey.org/viewer	Yes
QFitsView	Pro	GUI and command line	No	Displays & Manipulates	No	Yes	Yes	Limited	Mac, Win, Linux	No	Free	Thomas Ott, MPE	http://www.mpe.mpg.de/~ott/dpuser/qfitsview.html	Yes
Gaia Sky	Am	GUI and scripts	Yes	No	No	No	No	No	Mac, Win, Linux	No	Free	ZAH	https://zah.uni-heidelberg.de/de/institute-des-zah/ari/gaia2/info-material-fuer-die-oeffentlichkeit-downloads/gaiasky/	Yes
FITS Liberator	Pro/Am	GUI	No	Displays & Manipulates	No	No	No	No	Mac, Win	No	Free	ESA, ESO, NASA	https://spacetelescope.org/projects/fits_liberator/	Yes
xTime	Pro	Utility	Yes	No	No	No	No	No	Browser	No	Free	NASA Goddard	https://heasarc.gsfc.nasa.gov/cgi-bin/Tools/xTime/xTime.pl	Yes
wiseview	Pro/Am	GUI	Yes	Displays & Manipulates	No	No	No	No	Browser	No	Free	Dan Caselden and Paul Westin	http://byw.tools/wiseview	Yes
Astropy	Pro	GUI and command line	Yes	Displays & Manipulates	Limited	Yes	Yes	Yes	based on python	Yes	Free	NumFOCUS	https://www.astropy.org/	Yes
Lightkurve	Pro	GUI and command line	Yes	Displays & Manipulates	No	No	No	Yes	based on python	Yes	Free	Lightkurve collaboration	https://docs.lightkurve.org/	Yes
Chirp	Pro	Alert Software	Yes	No	No	No	No	Yes	Browser, Google Play, App Store	No	Free	Aurore Simonnet, EPO Sonoma State University	http://chirp.sr.bham.ac.uk/	Yes
TOPCAT	Pro	GUI and command line	Yes	Displays & Manipulates	Limited	Yes	Yes(?)	Yes	Mac, Win, Linux, Solaris	Yes	Free	Developed mostly in the UK	http://www.star.bris.ac.uk/~mbt/topcat/	Yes
Space Engine	Am	GUI	No	No	No	No	No	No	Mac, Win, Linux	No	$	Vladimir Romanyuk	http://spaceengine.org/	Yes
Universe Sandbox	Am	GUI	No	No	No	No	No	No	Mac, Win, Linux	No	$	Dan Dixon	http://universesandbox.com/	Yes
Astrometry.net	Pro/Am	GUI	Yes	No	No	No	No	Yes	Browser or Mac, Win, Linux	No	Free	NSF, NASA & NRC	https://web.archive.org/web/20101015122353/http://www.astrometry.net/	Yes
MIST	Pro	GUI	Yes	No	No	No	No	Yes	Browser	No	Free	NSF, NASA & Packard Foundation	http://waps.cfa.harvard.edu/MIST/index.html	Yes
Banyan Σ	Pro	GUI	Yes	No	No	No	No	Yes	Browser, IDL code or python code	No	Free	Jonathan Gagné	http://www.exoplanetes.umontreal.ca/banyan/banyansigma.php	Yes
OpenSpace	Am	GUI	No?	No	No	No	No	No?	Mac, Win	No	Free	NASA, Knut & Alice Wallenberg Foundation, AMNH	https://www.openspaceproject.com/	Yes
iDaVIE	Pro	VR and GUI	No	Displays	No	Yes	Yes	Yes	Win	No	Free	IDIA and UCT	https://idavie.readthedocs.io/en/latest/ https://vislab.idia.ac.za/tools	Yes
Collimation Circles	Pro/Am	GUI	No	No	No	No	No	No	Win, Mac, Linux, Raspberry PI OS	No	Free	Simon Šander	https://saimons-astronomy.webador.com/software/collimation-circles	Yes
