= Aladin Sky Atlas =

Interactive software sky atlas

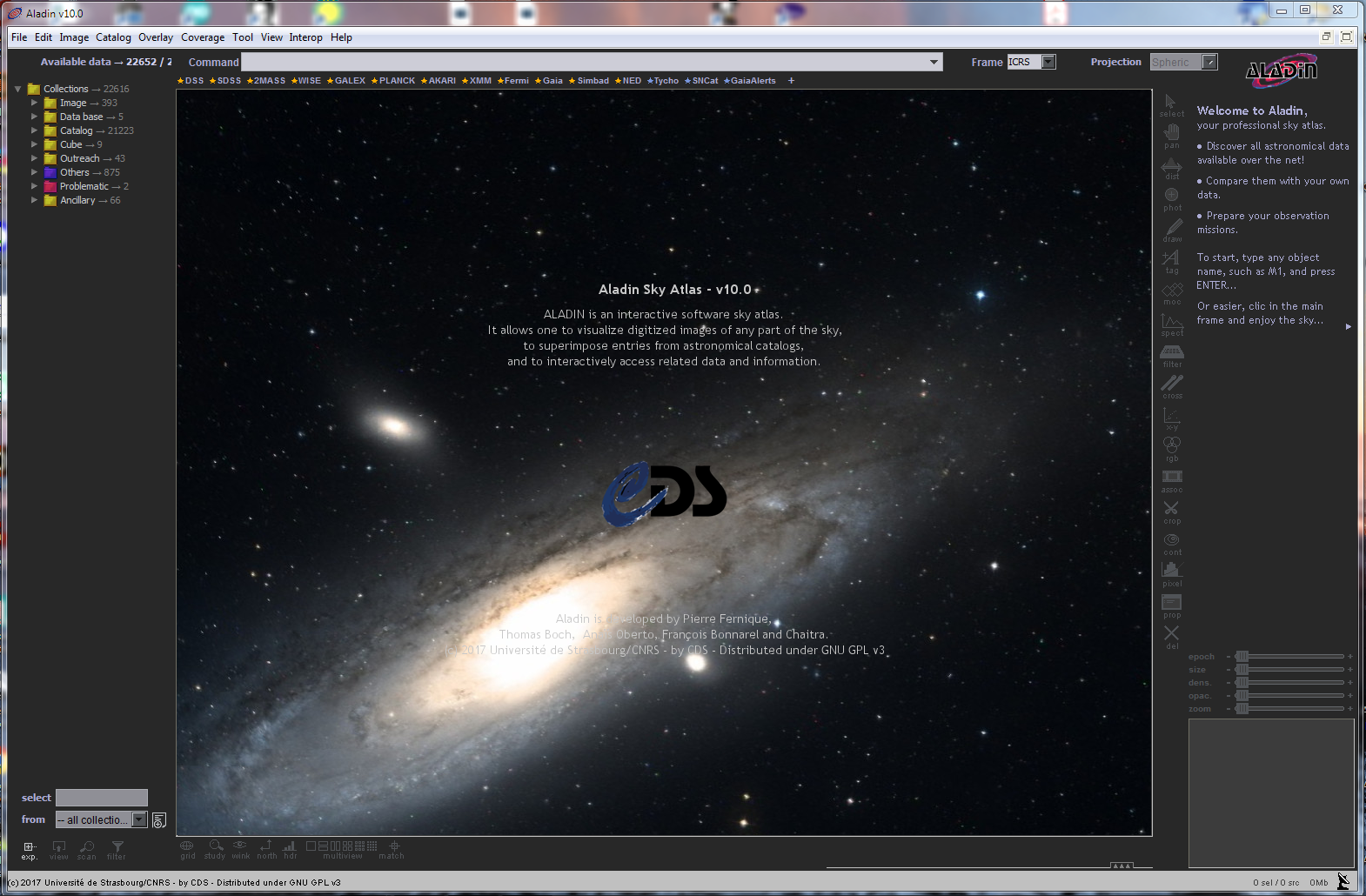
Screenshot of Aladin User Interface (Version 10)

Aladin is an interactive software sky atlas, created in France. It allows the user to visualize digitized astronomical images, superimpose entries from astronomical catalogues or databases, and interactively access related data and information from the SIMBAD database, the VizieR service and other archives for all known sources in the field.

Created in 1999, Aladin has become a widely used VO portal for locating data of interest, accessing and exploring distributed datasets, visualizing multi-wavelength data. Aladin is in compliance with existing or emerging VO standards, and interconnected with other visualisation or analysis tools, and has ability to easily compare heterogeneous data.

Aladin is developed and maintained by the Centre de données astronomiques de Strasbourg (CDS) and released under the GNU GPL v3.

== See also ==
- Centre national de la recherche scientifique
- Observatory of Strasbourg
- SKY-MAP.ORG
- Stellarium
- ESASky
