= Euro-VO =

Astronomy organization

The European Virtual Observatory or EURO-VO project aims at deploying an operational virtual observatory in Europe. Its objectives are technology take-up and VO-compliant resource provision, building of technical infrastructure, and support for its utilization by the scientific community.

The EURO-VO work programme is the logical continuation of the Astrophysical Virtual Observatory (AVO), which created the foundations of a regional-scale infrastructure in a Phase-A effort. EURO-VO is currently a Phase-B deployment of an operational VO in Europe.
