= Bifilar sundial =

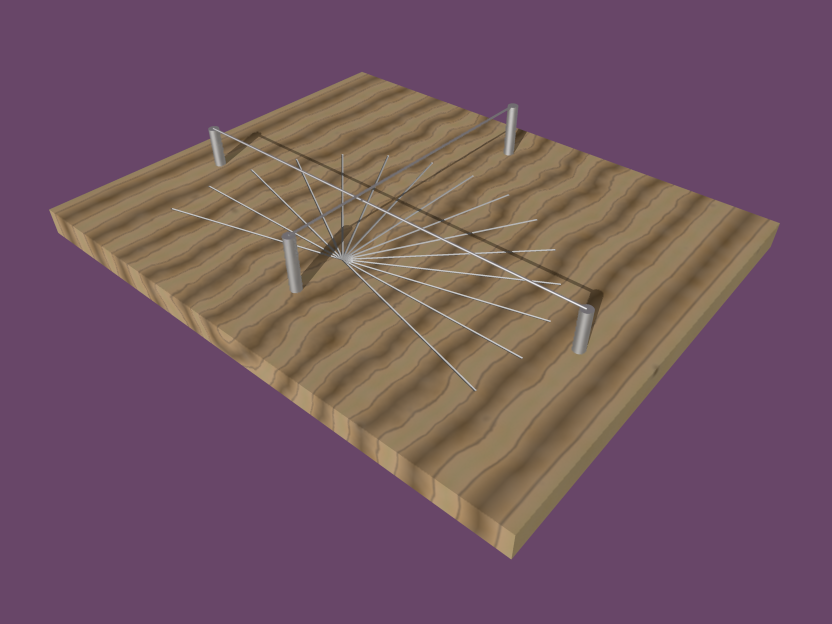
A bifilar dial showing the two wires

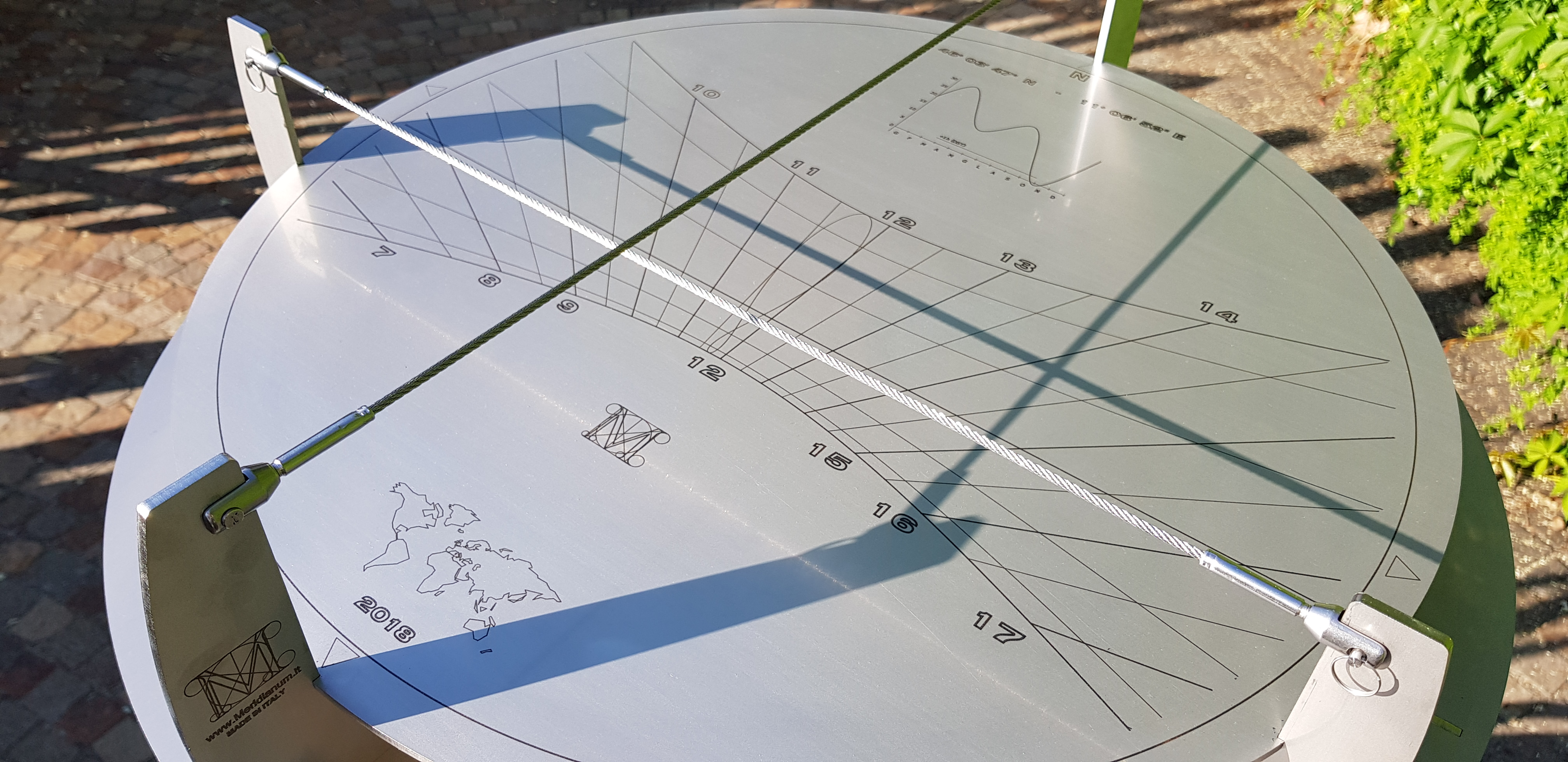
Stainless steel bifilar sundial in Italy

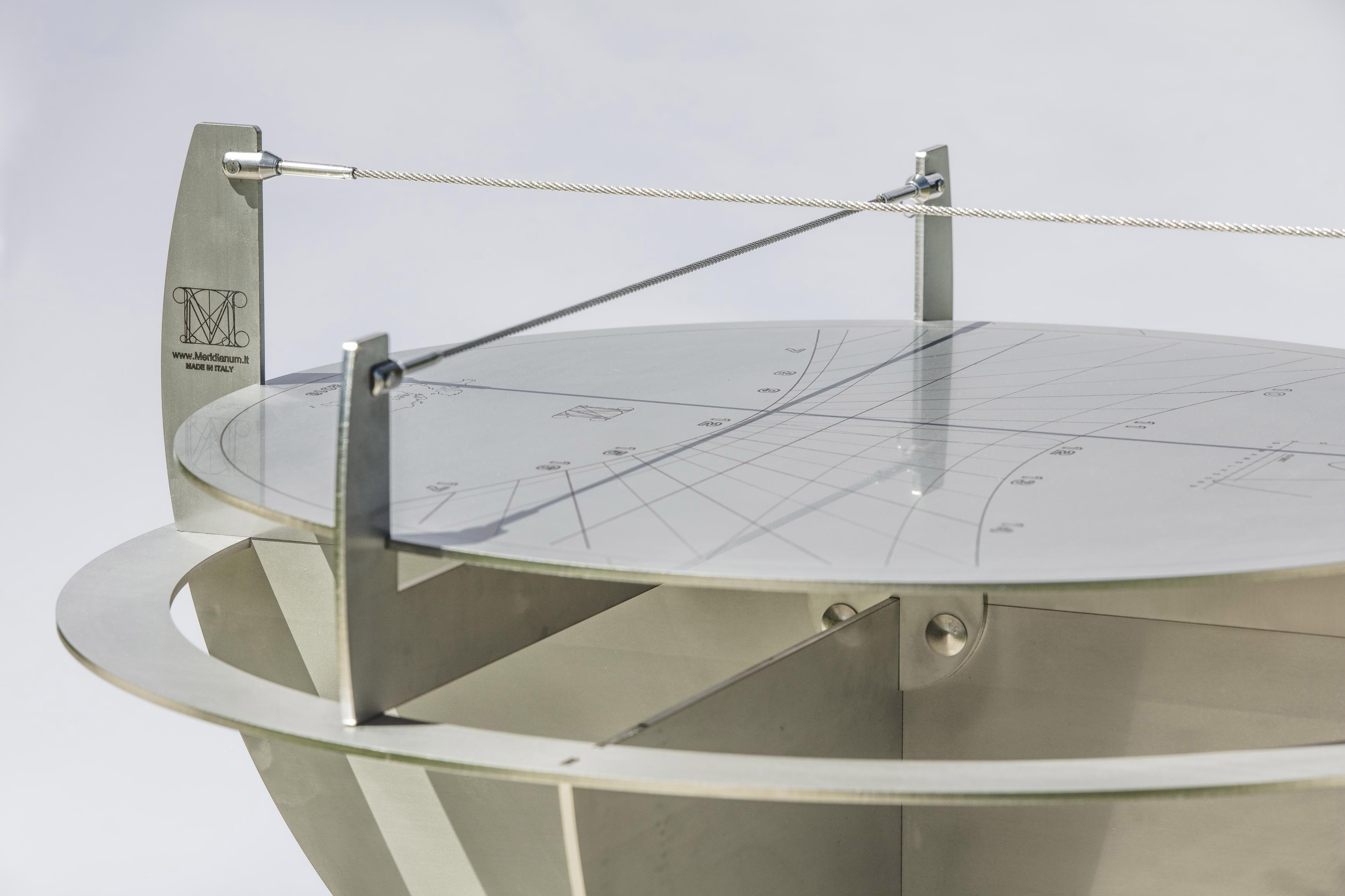
Particular of the steel threads

A bifilar dial is a type of sundial invented by the German mathematician Hugo Michnik in 1922. It has two non-touching threads parallel to the dial. Usually the second thread is orthogonal-(perpendicular) to the first. The intersection of the two threads' shadows gives the local apparent time.

When the threads have the correctly calculated separation, the hour-lines on the horizontal surface are uniformly drawn. The angle between successive hour-lines is constant. The hour-lines for successive hours are 15 degrees apart.

== History ==
The bifilar dial was invented in April 1922 by the mathematician and maths teacher, Hugo Michnik, from Beuthen, Upper Silesia. He studied the horizontal dial- starting on a conventional XYZ cartesian framework and building up a general projection which he states was an exceptional case of a Steiner transformation. He related the trace of the sun to conic sections and the angle on the dial-plate to the hour angle and the calculation of local apparent time, using conventional hours and the historic Italian and Babylonian hours. He refers in the paper, to a previous publication on the theory of sundials in 1914.

His method has been applied to vertical near-declinant dials, and a more general declining-reclining dial.

Work has been subsequently done by Dominique Collin.

== Horizontal bifilar dial ==
This was the dial that Hugo Michnik invented and studied. By simplifying the general example so:

- the wires cross orthogonally- one running north-south and the other east-west
- The east west wire passes under the north south dial, so the $h_2 = h_1 \sin\varphi\quad$ (latitude)

the shadow is thrown on a dial-plate marked out like a simple equatorial sundial.

=== The proof ===
The first wire $f_1\,$ is orientated north-south at a constant distance $h_1\,$ from the dial plate $\Pi\,$
The second wire $f_2\,$ is orientated east-west at a constant distance $h_2\,$ from the dial plate $\Pi\,$ (thus $f_2\,$ is orthogonal to $f_1\,$ which lies on the plane of the meridian ).

In this proof $\varphi$ (pronounced phi) is the latitude of the dial plate.

Respectively, $(\mathcal D_1)$ and $(\mathcal D_2)$ are the vertical projections of wires $f_1\,$ and $f_2\,$ on the dial plate $\Pi\,$.

Point $O\,$ is the point on the dial plate directly under the two wires' intersection.
That point is the origin of the X,Y co-ordinate system referred to below.

The X-axis is the east–west line passing through the origin. The Y-axis is the north–south line passing through the origin. The positive Y direction is northward.

One can show that if the position of the sun is known and determined by the spherical coordinates $t_\odot$ and $\delta\,$ (pronounced t-dot and delta, respectively the known as the hour angle et declination), the co-ordinates $x_I\,$ and $y_I\,$ of point $I\,$, the intersection on the two shadows on the dial-plate $\Pi\,$ have values of :

$$\begin{matrix}
x_I &=& h_1 \frac {\sin t_\odot}{\sin\varphi\ \operatorname{tan}\delta\ + \ \cos\varphi\cos t_\odot} \\
\ &\ & \ \\
y_I &=& h_2 \frac{-\cos\varphi\ \operatorname{tan}\delta\ + \ \sin\varphi\cos t_\odot}{\sin\varphi\ \operatorname{tan}\delta\ + \ \cos\varphi\cos t_\odot}
\end{matrix}$$

Eliminating the variable $\delta\,$ in the two preceding equations, one obtains a new equation defined for $x_I\,$ and $y_I\,$ which gives, as a function of the latitude $\varphi$ and the solar hour angle $t_\odot$, the equation of the trace of the sun associated with the local apparent time. In its simplest form this equation is written:

$$\frac{x_I}{y_I + h_2/\operatorname{tan}\varphi} = \frac{h_1 \sin\varphi}{h_2}\ \operatorname{tan}t_\odot$$

This relation shows that the hour traces are indeed line segments and the meeting-point of these line segments is the point $C\,$:

$x_C = 0\,$

$y_C = -h_2 / \operatorname{tan}\varphi$

In other words, point C is south of point O (where the wires intersect), by a distance of $h_2 / \operatorname{tan}\varphi$, where $\varphi$ is the latitude.

Special case

If one arranges the two wire heights $h_2\,$ and $h_1\,$ such :

$h_2 = h_1 \sin\varphi\quad$

then the equation for the hour lines can be simply written as:

$$\frac{x_I - x_C}{y_I - y_C} = \operatorname{tan}t_\odot$$

at all times, the intersection $I\,$ of the shadows on the dial plate $\Pi\,$ is such that the angle $\widehat{OCI}$ is equal to the hour angle $t_\odot$ of the sun so thus represents solar time.

So provided the sundial respects the la condition $h_2 = h_1 \sin\varphi\quad$ the trace of the sun corresponds to the hour-angle shown by lines (rays) centred on the point $C\,$ and the 13 rays that correspond to the hours 6:00, 7:00, 8:00, 9:00... 15:00, 16:00, 17:00, 18:00 are regularly spaced at a constant angle of 15°, about point C. (Note: This property was named the homogeneity of hour lines ' French: homogénéité des lignes horaires by the French mathematician Dominique Collin.)

=== A practical example ===
A London dial is the name given to dials set for 51° 30' N. A simple London bifilar dial has a dial plate with 13 line segments drawn outward from a centre-point C, with each hour's line drawn 15° clockwise from the previous hour's line. The midday line is aligned towards the north.

The north–south wire is 10 cm ($h_1$) above the midday line. That east-west wire is placed at a height of 7.826 ($h_2$) centimeters- equivalent to 10 cm x sin(51° 30'). This passes through C. The east–west wire crosses the north–south wire 6.275 cm north of the centre-point C- that being the equivalent of - 7.826 ($h_2$) divided by tan (51° 30').

== Reclining-declining bifilar sundials ==
Whether a sundial is a bifilar, or whether it's the familiar flat-dial with a straight style (like the usual horizontal and vertical-declining sundials), making it reclining, vertical-declining, or reclining-declining is exactly the same. The declining or reclining-declining mounting is achieved in exactly the same manner, whether the dial is bifilar, or the usual straight-style flat dial.

For any flat-dial, whether bifilar, or ordinary straight-style, the north celestial pole has a certain altitude, measured from the plane of the dial.

1. Effective latitude:If that dial-plane is horizontal, then it's a horizontal dial (bifilar, or straight-style). Then, of course the north celestial pole's altitude, measured from the dial-plane, is the latitude of the location. Well then, if the flat-dial is reclined, declined, or reclined-&-declined, everything is the same as if it the dial were horizontal, with the celestial pole's altitude, measured with respect to the dial-plane, treated as the latitude.
2. Dial-North:Likewise, the north celestial pole's longitude, measured with respect to the plane of the dial, with respect to the downward direction (or the direction that a marble would roll, if the dial is reclining) on the dial-face, is the direction that is treated as north, when drawing the hour-lines. I'll call that direction "dial-north".
3. Equatorial Longitude (hour-angle) of dial-north:It's necessary to find the equatorial longitude of the dial-north direction (drawn on the dial). In the case of the horizontal dial, of course that's an hour-angle of zero, the south meridian. That determines what time ("dial-north time") is represented by the dial-north line. Other times, before and after that, can then have their lines drawn according to their differences from dial-north time—in the same way as they' be drawn on a horizontal dial-face according to their differences from 12 noon (true solar time).
