= International Virtual Observatory Alliance =

The International Virtual Observatory Alliance (IVOA) is a worldwide scientific organisation formed in June 2002. Its mission is to facilitate international coordination and collaboration necessary for enabling global and integrated access to data gathered by astronomical observatories. An information system allowing such an access is called a virtual observatory. The main task of the organisation so far has focused on defining standards to ensure interoperability of the different virtual observatory projects already existing or in development.

The IVOA now comprises 19 VO projects from Argentina, Armenia, Australia, Brazil, Canada, China, Europe, France, Germany, Hungary, India, Italy, Japan, Korea, Russia, Spain, Ukraine, the United Kingdom, and the United States. Membership is open to other national and international projects according to the IVOA Guidelines for Participation.

Senior representatives from each national VObs project form the IVOA Executive Committee. A chair is chosen from among the representatives and serves a 1.5 year term, preceded by a 1.5 year term as deputy chair. The Executive Committee meets 3-4 times a year to discuss goals, priorities, and strategies.

== Members ==
IVOA currently brings together nineteen member organisations, both national and international :

1. Argentina Virtual Observatory
2. Armenian Virtual Observatory
3. AstroGrid UK
4. Australian Virtual Observatory
5. Brazilian Virtual Observatory
6. Chinese Virtual Observatory
7. Chilean Virtual Observatory
8. Canadian Virtual Observatory - ChiVO
9. European Space Agency
10. European Virtual Observatory - Euro-VO
11. German Astrophysical Virtual Observatory
12. Hungarian Virtual Observatory
13. Italian Virtual Observatory
14. Japanese Virtual Observatory
15. National Virtual Observatory (USA)
16. Observatoire Virtuel France
17. Russian Virtual Observatory
18. Spanish Virtual Observatory
19. Ukrainian Virtual Observatory
20. Virtual Observatory India

== Working Groups ==
The tasks of the IVOA are distributed over different working groups:

=== Applications ===
The IVOA Applications Working Group is concerned primarily with the software tools that Astronomers use to access VO data and services for doing Astronomy. The role of the Applications Working Group is to:

- Provide a forum for announcement and discussion of VO Applications
- Provide feedback to IVOA on the implementation of interoperability standards in VO applications
- Identify missing or desirable technical capabilities for VO applications
- Identify missing or desirable components in terms of scientific usability
- Propose and develop standards specific to VO Astronomy-user-Applications

=== Data Access Layer ===
The task of the Data Access Layer (DAL) working group is to define and formulate VO standards for remote data access. Client data analysis software will use these services to access data via the VO framework; data providers will implement these services to publish data to the VO.

The DAL working groups has defined various standards for accessing data sets, in particular images (Simple Image Access Protocol, SIAP6), spectra (Simple Spectra Access Protocol, SSAP7) and source catalogues (Simple Cone Search, SCS8).

=== Data Modelling ===
The role of the Data Modelling Working Group is to provide a framework for the description of metadata attached to observed or simulated data. The activity of the Data Model WG activity focuses on logical relationships between these metadata, examines how an astronomer wants to retrieve, process and interpret astronomical data, and provides an architecture to handle them. What is defined in this WG can then be re-used in the protocols defined by the DAL WG or in VO aware applications.

=== Grid and Web Services ===
The aim of the Grid and Web Services(GWS) Working Group is to define the use of Grid technologies and web services within the VO context and to investigate, specify, and implement required standards in this area. This group was formed from a merger of the Web Services group and the Grid group, ordered at the IVOA Executive meeting held during the IAU General Assembly in 2003.

=== Resource Registry ===
The Resource Registry Working Group defines the structure and interface to an IVOA Registry. Such a registry “ … will allow an astronomer to be able to locate, get details of, and make use of, any resource located anywhere in the IVO space, i.e. in any Virtual Observatory. The IVOA will define the protocols and standards whereby different registry services are able to interoperate and thereby realise this goal.”

=== Semantics ===
The Semantics Working Group will explore technology in the area of semantics with the aim of producing new standards that aid the interoperability of VO systems. The Semantics Working Group is concerned with the meaning or the interpretation of words, sentences, or other language forms in the context of astronomy. This includes standard descriptions of astrophysical objects, data types, concepts, events, or of any other phenomena in astronomy. The WG covers the study of relationships between words, symbols and concepts, as well as the meaning of such representations (ontology). The WG covers use of natural language in astronomy, including queries, translations, and internationalization of interfaces.

=== VO Query Language ===
The VO Query Language (VOQL) Working Group will be in charge of defining a universal Query Language to be used by applications accessing distributed data within the Virtual Observatory framework.

=== VOTable ===
The VOTable Working Group is in charge of the VOTable format, which is an XML standard for the interchange of data represented as a set of tables. In this context, a table is an unordered set of rows, each of a uniform format, as specified in the table metadata. Each row in a table is a sequence of table cells, and each of these contains either a primitive data type, or an array of such primitives. VOTable is derived from the Astrores format, itself modelled on the FITS Table format; VOTable was designed to be closer to the FITS Binary Table format.

=== Theory Interest Group ===
During the IVOA executive meeting of January 2004 in Garching, Germany, the IVOA Theory Interest Group (TIG) was formed with the goal of ensuring that theoretical data and services are taken into account in the IVOA standards process. By its charter, the IVOA Theory Interest Group intends to:

- Provide a forum for discussing theory specific issues in a VO context.
- Contribute to other IVOA working groups to ensure that theory specific requirements are included.
- Incorporate standard approaches defined in these groups when designing and implementing services on theoretical archives.
- Define standard services relevant for theoretical archives.
- Promote development of services for comparing theoretical results to observations and vice versa.
- Define relevant milestones and assign specific tasks to interested parties.
