= AstroGrid =

AstroGrid was a £7.7M project which built a data-grid for UK astronomy, forming part of the UK contribution to the International Virtual Observatory. AstroGrid announced its first full production release on 1 April 2008.

The project ran, in three phases, from 2001 to 2009. Accounts of its end-days suggest that many in the community regretted its early closing.
