= Virtual observatory =

A virtual observatory (VO) is a collection of interoperating data archives and software tools which utilize the internet to form a scientific research environment in which research programs can be conducted. Historically addressing astronomical subjects, space physics and geosciences have also been a focus of VO development.

In much the same way as a real observatory consists of a collection of unique instruments, the VO consists of a collection of data centres each with unique collections of observational data, software systems and processing capabilities.

The main goal is to allow transparent and distributed access to data available worldwide. This allows scientists to discover, access, analyze, and combine observational and laboratory data from heterogeneous data collections in a user-friendly manner.

The IVOA (International Virtual Observatory Alliance) is a standards body created by astronomical VO projects to develop and formalize the interoperability standards upon which the VO implementations are constructed.

== Examples ==
- AstroGrid: UK's Virtual Observatory Service
- ChiVO: the Chilean Virtual Observatory
- Euro-VO: the European VO (a partnership of VOs including AstroGrid, the French-VO, ESO, ESA...)
- National Virtual Observatory: USA's VO
- The eSTAR Project: a UK-funded virtual observatory project for autonomous ground-based followup to transient events.
- Virtual Observatory, India: India's Virtual Observatory
- Iran Virtual Observatory: Iran's Virtual Observatory
- Virtual Solar Terrestrial Observatory: Tetherless World Research Constellation at Rensselaer Polytechnic Institute in conjunction with the High Altitude Observatory of National Center for Atmospheric Research
- SPASE: Space Physics Archive Search and Extract
- TELEIOS: European Union-funded virtual observatory for Earth observation data. Powered by the CWI MonetDB scientific database, it provides access to TerraSAR-X archive of the DLR.

== Reference List of VO sites ==
- Argentinian Virtual Observatory
- Armenian Virtual Observatory
- Australian Virtual Observatory
- Brazilian Virtual Observatory
- Chilean Virtual Observatory
- European Virtual Observatory
- German Astrophysical Virtual Observatory
- Hungarian Virtual Observatory
- Iran Virtual Observatory
- Italian Virtual Observatory
- Japanese Virtual Observatory
- Korean Virtual Observatory
- Russian Virtual Observatory
- Spanish Virtual Observatory
- UK Virtual Observatory
- US Virtual Astronomical Observatory
- Virtual Observatory France
- Virtual Observatory, India
- Virtual Solar Terrestrial Observatory

== See also ==
- Planetarium software
- Virtual research environment
- Spatial data infrastructure

== References and sources ==
=== Sources ===
- Talk on NEMO and theory in a virtual observatory (Peter Teuben, Univ. of Maryland)
- Virtual Observatories initiatives worldwide, State of the projects 2006 (InterQuanta)
- Documentation on VO tools (Terapix)
